= MF Doom discography =

- Studio albums: 6
- Extended plays: 6
- Live albums: 2
- Compilation albums: 4
- Singles: 22
- Music videos: 32
- Instrumental albums: 10
- Collaborative albums: 7
- Mixtapes: 1

British-American rapper and record producer Daniel Dumile, also known under several stage names, most notably MF Doom, released 6 studio albums, 2 live albums, 3 compilation albums, 10 instrumental albums, 7 collaborative albums, 22 singles, and 32 music videos in his career. The rapper died on October 31, 2020. The day is known as Doomsday.

Dumile initially performed under the stage name Zev Love X as a member of the rap group KMD. The group would release their debut studio album Mr. Hood in May 1991. In 1993, just before the release of the second KMD album Black Bastards, Dumile's brother and fellow KMD member Subroc was struck by a car and killed, and that same week the group was dropped from Elektra Records.

In September 1999, Dumile would release his debut studio album Operation: Doomsday under a new stage name, MF Doom, wearing a mask similar to that of Marvel Comics super-villain Doctor Doom. In 2003, he would release his second and third studio albums, Take Me to Your Leader, under the stage name King Geedorah, and Vaudeville Villain under the name Viktor Vaughn.

Dumile's first commercial breakthrough came in March 2004, with the album Madvillainy, released with producer Madlib under the group name Madvillain. The album peaked at number 179 on the US Billboard 200. In August of that year, he released the next Viktor Vaughn album, VV:2, which was followed by his fifth studio album Mm..Food in November.

He would continue to release collaborative albums in the following years, including The Mouse and The Mask with Danger Mouse in 2005. In 2009, he released his sixth and final solo studio album, Born Like This, under the pseudonym Doom (stylized in all caps). From this point until his death in 2020, Dumile exclusively released collaborative works, including NehruvianDoom with Bishop Nehru in 2014 and three other studio projects.

== Albums ==
=== Studio albums ===
List of solo studio albums, with selected chart positions
| Title | Album details | Peak chart positions | | | | | | | | Certifications |
| Title | Album details | US | US R&B/ HH | US Rap | US Indie | US Heat. | AUS | CAN | SCO | Certifications |
|---|---|---|---|---|---|---|---|---|---|---|
| Operation: Doomsday | Released: October 19, 1999; Label: Fondle 'Em; Formats: CD, LP, digital download | 109 | — | — | — | — | — | — | — | |
| Take Me to Your Leader (as King Geedorah) | Released: June 17, 2003; Label: Big Dada; Formats: CD, LP, digital download | — | — | — | — | — | — | — | 80 | |
| Vaudeville Villain (as Viktor Vaughn) | Released: September 16, 2003; Label: Sound-Ink, Traffic Entertainment Group; Format: CD, LP, digital download | 133 | 99 | — | 14 | — | — | — | — | |
| VV:2 (as Viktor Vaughn) | Released: August 3, 2004; Label: Insomniac, Inc.; Format: CD, LP, digital download | — | — | — | — | — | — | — | — | |
| Mm..Food | Released: November 16, 2004; Label: RSE; Format: CD, LP, digital download | 18 | 5 | 4 | 1 | 9 | 28 | 67 | — | RIAA: Gold; BPI: Gold; RMNZ: Gold |
| Born Like This (as Doom) | Released: March 24, 2009; Label: Lex; Format: CD, LP, digital download | 52 | 29 | 9 | 5 | — | — | — | — | |

=== Collaborative albums ===
List of collaborative studio albums, with selected chart positions and certifications
| Title | Album details | Peak chart positions | | | | | | | Certifications |
| Title | Album details | US | US Heat. | US Ind. | US R&B /HH | US Rap | CAN | UK | Certifications |
|---|---|---|---|---|---|---|---|---|---|
| Madvillainy (with Madlib as Madvillain) | Released: March 24, 2004; Label: Stones Throw; Formats: CD, LP, cassette | 73 | 9 | 10 | 42 | — | 64 | 58 | RIAA: Gold; BPI: Gold |
| Special Herbs + Spices Volume 1 (with MF Grimm) | Released: May 11, 2004; Label: Day by Day Entertainment; Formats: CD, LP | — | — | — | — | — | — | — | |
| The Mouse and the Mask (with Danger Mouse as Danger Doom) | Released: October 10, 2005 (EU), October 11, 2005 (US); Label(s): Epitaph, Lex, Metalface; Formats: CD, LP | 41 | — | 2 | 31 | — | — | — | |
| Key to the Kuffs (with Jneiro Jarel as JJ Doom) | Released: August 20, 2012; Label(s): Lex; Formats: CD, LP, digital download | 148 | 3 | 24 | 25 | — | — | — | |
| NehruvianDoom (with Bishop Nehru as NehruvianDoom) | Released: October 7, 2014; Label(s): Lex; Formats: CD, LP | 59 | — | 11 | 10 | 4 | — | — | |
| Czarface Meets Metal Face (with Czarface) | Released: March 30, 2018; Label(s): 7L, Get On Down; Formats: LP, CD, digital download | 134 | 1 | 5 | — | — | — | — | |
| Super What? (with Czarface) | Release date: May 7, 2021; Label(s): Silver Age; Formats: LP, CD, digital download | — | — | — | — | — | — | — | |

=== Live albums ===
List of live albums, showing date released
| Title | Album details |
|---|---|
| Live from Planet X | Released: March 8, 2005; Label: Nature Sounds; Format: DVD, CD, LP, digital download |
| Expektoration | Released: September 14, 2010; Label: Gold Dust Media; Format: DVD, CD, digital download |

=== Compilation albums ===
List of compilation albums
| Title | Album details |
|---|---|
| Special Blends, Vol. 1 & 2 | Released: 2004; Label: Metal Face; Format: 2-CD |
| Mm..LeftOvers | Released: November 16, 2004; Label: Rhymesayers Entertainment, HipHopSite.com; Format: CD |
| Mm..More Food | Released: November 16, 2004; Label: Sandbox Automatic; Format: CD |
| Special Herbs: The Box Set Vol. 0–9 | Released: January 24, 2006; Label: Nature Sounds; Format: 3-CD, digital download |
| Unexpected Guests | Released: October 27, 2009; Label: Gold Dust Media; Format: 3-CD, digital download |
| The Missing Notebook Rhymes | Released: August–September 2017; Label: Adultswim.com; Format: digital download |

=== Instrumental albums ===
List of instrumental albums
| Title | Album details |
|---|---|
| Special Herbs, Vol. 1 | Released: 2001; Label: Female Fun; Format: CD |
| Special Herbs, Vol. 2 | Released: January 1, 2002; Label: High Times; Format: CD |
| Special Herbs, Vol. 3 | Released: 2002; Label: Female Fun; Format: CD |
| Special Herbs, Vol. 4 | Released: September 23, 2003; Label: Nature Sounds; Format: CD |
| Special Herbs, 4,5,6 | Released: November 24, 2003; Label: Shaman Works; Format: CD |
| Special Herbs, Vol. 5 & 6 | Released: March 23, 2004; Label: Nature Sounds; Format: CD |
| Special Herbs, Vol. 7 & 8 | Released: September 21, 2004; Label: Shaman Works; Format: CD |
| Special Herbs, Vol. 9 & 0 | Released: July 12, 2005; Label: Shaman Works; Format: CD |

=== Remix albums ===
List of live albums, showing date released
| Title | Album details |
|---|---|
| Special Blends, Vol. 1 | Released: 2004; Label: Metal Face; Format: LP |
| Special Blends, Vol. 2 | Released: 2004; Label: Metal Face; Format: LP |

== Mixtapes ==
List of mixtapes
| Title | Mixtape details |
|---|---|
| Swift and Changeable: The Prequel | Released: 2012; Label: Self-released; Format: Online |

== Extended plays ==
List of collaborative extended plays
| Title | EP details |
|---|---|
| MF EP (with MF Grimm) | Released: November 28, 2000; Label(s): Brick; Formats: CD |
| The Prof. Meets The SUPER VILLAIN (with The Prof.) | Released: October 1, 2002; Label(s): Nature Sounds; Formats: - |
| Occult Hymn (with Danger Mouse as Danger Doom) | Released: May 30, 2006; Label(s): Adult Swim; Formats: Digital download |
| Unicron (with Trunks) | Released: January 2008; Label(s): unknown; Formats: Digital download |
| Victory Laps EP (with Ghostface Killah as DoomStarks) | Released: July 26, 2011; Label(s): Nature Sounds; Formats: Digital download |
| Bookhead EP (with Jneiro Jarel as JJ Doom) | Released: February 17, 2014; Label(s): Lex; Formats: LP, digital download |
| WestSide Doom (with Westside Gunn) | Released: October 13, 2017; Label(s): Griselda Records; Formats: LP, digital download |

== Demos ==
List of demos
| Title | Album details |
|---|---|
| Madvillainy Demo Tape (with Madlib as Madvillain) | Released: September 15, 2008 (Madvillainy 2: The Box); Label: Stones Throw; Format: Cassette |

== Singles ==
=== As lead artist ===
List of singles showing year released and album name
| Title | Year | Certifications | Album |
|---|---|---|---|
| "Dead Bent"/"Gas Drawls"/"Hey!" | 1997 | | Operation: Doomsday |
| "Greenbacks"/"Go with the Flow" | 1997 | | Operation: Doomsday |
| "The M.I.C."/"Red & Gold" | 1998 | | Operation: Doomsday |
| "I Hear Voices Pt. 1" | 2001 | | Operation: Doomsday (2001 re-release) |
| "My Favorite Ladies"/"All Outta Ale" | 2002 | | The Prof. Meets The SUPER VILLAIN |
| "Rae Dawn"/"Change the Beat" (as Viktor Vaughn) | 2003 | | Vaudeville Villain |
| "Anti-Matter" (as King Geedorah featuring Mr. Fantastik) | 2003 | | Take Me to Your Leader |
| "Money Folder" (with Madlib as Madvillain) | 2003 | | Madvillainy |
| "All Caps" (with Madlib as Madvillain) | 2004 | | Madvillainy |
| "Mr. Clean"/"Modern Day Mugging" | 2004 | | Vaudeville Villain |
| "One Beer" | 2004 | RIAA: Gold; BPI: Silver; RMNZ: Gold | Mm..Food |
| "Hoe Cakes" | 2004 | RIAA: Gold; BPI: Silver; RMNZ: Gold | Mm..Food |
| "Sniper Elite" / "Sniper Elite & Murder Goons" (with J Dilla and Ghostface Killah as Dilla Ghost Doom) | 2008 | | Non-album single |
| "One Beer (Drunk Version)" (with Madlib as Madvillain) | 2008 | | Madvillainy 2: The Box |
| "Gazzillion Ear" | 2010 | | Born Like This |
| "Papermill" (with Madlib as Madvillain) | 2010 | | Adult Swim Singles Program 2010 |
| "Victory Laps" (with Ghostface Killah as DoomStarks featuring Madlib) | 2011 | | Victory Laps EP |
| "Lively Hood" (with Ghostface Killah as DoomStarks) | 2015 | | Non-album singles |
| "Avalanche" (with Madlib as Madvillain) | 2016 | | Non-album singles |
| "Nautical Depth" (with Czarface) | 2018 | | Czarface Meets Metal Face |
| "Drop the Bomb" (with YOTA (Youth of the Apocalypse)) | 2018 | | Non-album single |

=== As featured artist ===
List of singles as featured artist, with chart positions
| Title | Year | Peaks | | Certifications | Album |
| Title | Year | AUS | BEL (FL) | Certifications | Album |
|---|---|---|---|---|---|
| "The Gas Face" (3rd Bass featuring Zev Love X) | 1989 | — | — | | The Cactus Album |
| "Yee Haw/Is He Ill?" (Molemen with MF Doom) | 2003 | — | — | | Non-album single |
| "Impending Doom" (Daedalus featuring MF Doom) | 2005 | — | — | | Exquisite Corpse |
| "Ray Gun" (BadBadNotGood and Ghostface Killah featuring MF Doom) | 2015 | — | — | | Sour Soul |
| "Frankie Sinatra" (The Avalanches feat. Danny Brown & MF Doom) | 2016 | 34 | 36 | ARIA: Gold | Wildflower |
| "The Chocolate Conquistadors" (BadBadNotGood featuring MF Doom) | 2020 | — | — | | Grand Theft Auto Online: The Cayo Perico Heist |
| "Cookie Chips" (Rejjie Snow, Cam O'bi featuring MF Doom) | 2020 | — | — | | Baw Baw Black Sheep |
| "Belize" (Danger Mouse and Black Thought featuring MF Doom) | 2022 | — | — | | Cheat Codes |

=== Promotional singles ===
List of singles showing year released and album name
| Title | Year | Album | Label |
|---|---|---|---|
| "Saliva" (as Viktor Vaughn) | 2003 | Vaudeville Villain | Sound-Ink |

=== Other certified songs ===
| Title | Year | Certifications | Album |
|---|---|---|---|
| "Doomsday" | 1999 | BPI: Silver; RMNZ: Gold | Operation: Doomsday |
| "Rapp Snitch Knishes" (featuring Mr. Fantastik) | 2004 | RIAA: Platinum; BPI: Gold; RMNZ: Platinum | Mm..Food |
| "That's That" | 2009 | MC: Gold | Born Like This |

== Guest appearances ==
List of guest appearances, with other performing artists, showing year released and album name
| Title | Year | Other artist(s) | Album |
|---|---|---|---|
| "Ace in the Hole" | 1991 | 3rd Bass | Derelicts of Dialect |
| "New Beginning" | 1999 | Scott Free | On the Ropes (Original Motion Picture Soundtrack) |
| "A Word of Advice" | 2000 | Fog | Fog |
| "Run the Sphere" (Disco Ducks Remix) | 2000 | Monster Island Czars, MF Grimm, Megalon, X-Ray | —N/a |
| "Put Your Quarter Up" | 2001 | Molemen, Aesop Rock, Slug | Ritual of the Molemen |
| "Black List" | 2001 | Prefuse 73, Aesop Rock | Vocal Studies + Uprock Narratives |
| "Monday Night at Fluid" | 2001 | King Honey, Kurious | Swift & Changeable |
| "Fondle 'Em Fossils" | 2001 | Breeze, Q-Unique, Godfather Don, J-Treds | Farewell Fondle 'Em |
| "Foolish" | 2002 | MF Grimm, Megalon | The Downfall of Ibliys: A Ghetto Opera |
| "Voices Pt.1" | 2002 | MF Grimm | The Downfall of Ibliys: A Ghetto Opera |
| "Make a Buck" | 2002 | Count Bass D | Dwight Spitz |
| "Quite Buttery" | 2002 | Count Bass D | Dwight Spitz |
| "Mic Line" | 2002 | Monsta Island Czars | Escape from Monsta Island! |
| "Yikes!" | 2002 | Scienz of Life | Project Overground: The Scienz Experiment |
| "It Ain't Nuttin'" | 2002 | The Herbaliser | Something Wicked This Way Comes |
| "Strange Universe" | 2002 | Non Phixion | The Future Is Now |
| "Songs in the Key of Tryfe" | 2003 | Semi.Official | The Anti-Album |
| "Hold on To" | 2003 | Science Fiction | Non-album single |
| "The Line Up" | 2003 | C-Rayz Walz, Wordsworth, J-Treds, Thirstin Howl III, Vast Aire, Breezly Brewin | Ravipops (The Substance) |
| "Stepping Into Tomorrow" | 2003 | Madlib | Shades of Blue |
| "Chubb Rock Please Pay Paul His $2200 You Owe Him (People, Places, and Things)" | 2003 | Prince Paul, Chubb Rock, Wordsworth | Politics of the Business |
| "RockCo.Kane Flow" | 2004 | De La Soul | The Grind Date |
| "Somersault" (Danger Mouse Remix) | 2004 | Zero 7, Sia | —N/a |
| "Social Distortion" | 2004 | Prince Po | The Slickness |
| "Da Supafriendz" | 2004 | Vast Aire | Look Mom... No Hands |
| "Hooks Is Extra!" | 2004 | Christ Craft | Non-album song |
| "This Is Dedicated To" | 2004 | Wale Oyejide | One Day... Everything Changed |
| "Depuis que j'étais enfant" | 2004 | Klub de Loosers | Vive la Vie |
| "Melody (Remix)" | 2004 | Blend Crafters | Melody (Remix) - EP |
| "Verse vs. The Virus" | 2005 | Cipher | Children of God's Fire |
| "November Has Come" | 2005 | Gorillaz | Demon Days |
| "Biochemical Equation" | 2005 | RZA | Wu-Tang Meets the Indie Culture |
| "More Soup" | 2005 | Moka Only | The Desired Effect |
| "Ghostwhirl" | 2005 | Johnathan Toth | Ghostwhirl |
| "Fly That Knot" | 2005 | Talib Kweli | Right About Now: The Official Sucka Free Mix CD |
| "Closer" | 2005 | Quasimoto | The Further Adventures of Lord Quas |
| "Profitless Thoughts" | 2006 | Substance Abuse | Overproof |
| "Air" | 2006 | Dabrye | Two/Three |
| "My Favourite Ladies Pt. 2" | 2006 | dDamage | Shimmy Shimmy Blade |
| "Monkey Suite" | 2006 | Madlib | Chrome Children |
| "Project Jazz" | 2007 | Hell Razah, Talib Kweli | Renaissance Child |
| "Let's Go" | 2007 | Shape of Broad Minds | Craft of the Lost Art |
| "Vomit Chorus" | 2007 | C-Rayz Walz, Parallel Thought | Chorus Rhyme |
| "Distant Star" | 2007 | The Heliocentrics, Percee P | Out There |
| "Mash's Revenge" | 2008 | J Dilla, Guilty Simpson | B Ball Zombie War |
| "Trap Door" | 2008 | Jake One | White Van Music |
| "Get 'Er Done" | 2008 | Jake One | White Van Music |
| "More Tongue Less Teeth" | 2008 | Plastic Little | Plastic Little |
| "Gunfight" | 2008 | The Mighty Underdogs | The Prelude EP |
| "The Unexpected" | 2008 | DJ Babu, Sean Price | Duck Season Vol. 3 |
| "Sorcerers" | 2008 | John Robinson | Who Is This Man? |
| "Benetton" | 2009 | MC Serch, Kurious | II |
| "Chinatown Wars" | 2009 | Ghostface Killah | Grand Theft Auto: Chinatown Wars Soundtrack |
| "Fire Wood Drumstix" | 2009 | J Dilla | Jay Stay Paid |
| "She Still Got Dimples" | 2009 | DJ Rob A | The New Mortal Sin |
| "Hot Guacamole" | 2009 | MC Paul Barman | Thought Balloon Mushroom Cloud |
| "Wild Kingdom" | 2010 | CX Kidtronik, Diallo | —N/a |
| "Tema Do Canibal (Exile Mind the Gap Remix)" | 2011 | BK-One | Tema Do Canibal EP |
| "Action Reaction" | 2012 | Also Known As | Proper Villains |
| "Think I Am" | 2012 | Masta Ace, Big Daddy Kane | Ma_Doom: Son of Yvonne |
| "3 Dollars" | 2012 | Oh No | Ohnomite |
| "Coco Mango" | 2012 | Union Analogtronics | Analogtronics |
| "Owl" | 2013 | The Child of Lov | The Child of Lov |
| "Ghirda Got It" | 2013 | CX Kidtronik, Mobonix | Krak Attack 2: Ballad of Elli Skiff |
| "Between Villains" | 2013 | Captain Murphy, Earl Sweatshirt, Thundercat | Ideas+drafts+loops |
| "Masquatch" | 2014 | Flying Lotus | Grand Theft Auto V (Soundtrack) |
| "Iron Rose" | 2015 | Cannibal Ox | Blade of the Ronin |
| "Ka-Bang" | 2015 | Inspectah Deck, 7L & Esoteric | Every Hero Needs a Villain |
| "Masking" | 2015 | ASM | The Jade Amulet |
| "Knock Knock" | 2015 | MED, Blu, Madlib | Bad Neighbor |
| "Highs and Lows" | 2015 | PRhyme, Phonte | PRhyme [Deluxe] |
| "In the Streets" | 2016 | Busta Rhymes, BJ the Chicago Kid | The Return of the Dragon |
| "When the Lights Go Out" | 2016 | Atmosphere, Kool Keith | Fishing Blues |
| "Super Hero" | 2016 | Kool Keith | Feature Magnetic |
| "Notebook 01 - True Lightyears" | 2017 | Jay Electronica | Crack in Time |
| "Negus" | 2017 | Sean Price, Ike Eyez | Imperius Rex |
| "Books of War" | 2017 | Omegah Red, Zane Smith | Poetic Justice |
| "Pizza Shop Extended" | 2017 | IDK, Yung Gleesh, Del the Funky Homosapien | IWasVeryBad |
| "Lil Mufukuz" | 2018 | Dabrye | Three/Three |
| "Death Wish" | 2018 | Freddie Gibbs | MUGGS X Doom |
| "BDE" | 2019 | Your Old Droog, Mach-Hommy | Jewelry |
| "RST" | 2019 | Your Old Droog, Mach-Hommy | It Wasn't Even Close |
| "Police Myself" | 2019 | Open Mike Eagle | The New Negroes (Season 1 Soundtrack) |
| "Ninjarous" | 2019 | Danger Mouse, Sparklehorse | 30th Century Records Vol. 2 |
| "Dreaming in the Daytime" | 2019 | Tuxedo | Tuxedo III |
| "Last Sniff" | 2020 | Wilma Archer | A Western Circular |
| "MEATHEAD" | 2020 | Bishop Nehru | Nehruvia: My Disregarded Thoughts |
| "Lunch Break" | 2020 | Flying Lotus | The Music of Grand Theft Auto Online: Cayo Perico Heist |
| "The Rebirth" | 2020 | Sa-Roc | The Sharecropper's Daughter |
| "Dropout Boogie" | 2021 | Your Old Droog | —N/a |
| "Red" | 2021 | IDK, Westside Gunn, Jay Electronica | USEE4YOURSELF |
| "Barcade" | 2021 | Atmosphere, Aesop Rock | WORD? |
| "Chase" | 2021 | Justin Tyme, Canibus, Kool Keith | —N/a |
| "Barz Simpson" | 2022 | Sonnyjim, The Purist, Jay Electronica | White Girl Wasted |
| "FLAKKA" | 2026 | IDK | E.T.D.S. |

== Music videos ==
- 1991: "Who Me?" (as KMD)
- 1991: "Peachfuzz" (as KMD)
- 1999: "Dead Bent"
- 2000: "?" (w/ Kurious)
- 2001: "I Hear Voices"
- 2001: "My Favorite Ladies"
- 2003: "The Final Hour" (as King Geedorah)
- 2003: "Mr. Clean" (as Viktor Vaughn)
- 2004: "Rhinestone Cowboy" (as Madvillain)
- 2004: "Accordion" (as Madvillain)
- 2004: "All Caps" (as Madvillain)
- 2005: "A.T.H.F. (Aqua Teen Hunger Force)" [as Danger Doom]
- 2006: "Monkey Suite" (as Madvillain)
- 2007: "Gunfight" (w/ The Mighty Underdogs)
- 2009: "Benetton" (w/ Kurious & MC Serch)
- 2011: "Strange Ways" (as Madvillain)
- 2012: "Guv'nor" (as JJ Doom)
- 2013: "Bookhead" (as JJ Doom)
- 2014: "Darkness (HBU)" [as NehruvianDoom]
- 2015: "Ray Gun" (w/ BadBadNotGood & Ghostface Killah)
- 2015: "Masking" (w/ ASM (A State of Mind) as King Dumile)
- 2016: "Frankie Sinatra" (w/ The Avalanches & Danny Brown)
- 2016: "Super Hero" (w/ Kool Keith)
- 2018: "Bomb Thrown" (w/ Czarface)
- 2018: "Meddle with Metal" (w/ Czarface)
- 2018: "Death Wish" (as MUGGS x Doom, w/ Freddie Gibbs)
- 2018: "Drop the Bomb" (w/ YOTA: Youth of the Apocalypse)
- 2018: "Assassination Day" (as MUGGS x Doom, w/ Kool G Rap)
- 2018: "One Beer"
- 2020: "Cookiechips" (w/ Rejjie Snow)
- 2020: "Meathead" (w/ Bishop Nehru)
- 2021: "Barcade" (w/ Atmosphere & Aesop Rock)
- 2022: "Belize" (w/ Danger Mouse & Black Thought)
- 2024: "Vomitspit"
