= Live from Planet X =

Live album by MF Doom
- Released: 8 March 2005
- Recorded: 22 January 2004
- Venue: DNA Lounge
- Genre: Hip-hop
- Length: 38:39
- Label: Nature Sounds

MF Doom chronology
Mm..Food (2004)	Live from Planet X (2005)	Born Like This (2009)

Professional ratings
Review scores
Source	Rating
AllHipHop	3.5/5
AllMusic	3/5 stars
Cokemachineglow	favorable
RapReviews.com	7/10
Stylus Magazine	C

Live from Planet X is a live album by British-American rapper/producer MF Doom. It was released via Nature Sounds on 8 March 2005. It was recorded live in San Francisco, California, on 22 January 2004. Originally titled Live at the DNA Lounge, the album was initially given away with Special Herbs, Vols. 5 & 6. It includes tracks from Operation: Doomsday, Take Me to Your Leader, and Madvillainy.

== Critical reception ==
Peter Hepburn, writing for the website Cokemachineglow, gave the album a favorable review, saying, "Not only is Live From Planet X a fantastic album by live album standards, this could stand up against pretty much any rap album released so far this year."

Meanwhile, Stylus Magazine writer David Drake gave the album a grade of "C", saying, "For the discerning hip-hop fan, whatever their musical distribution allegiance, this is a pretty unnecessary (if occasionally interesting) addition to a catalogue already packed with fascinating material."

== Track listing ==
The entire concert is one 38:48 long track on the CD and digital versions.

No.	Title	Length
1.	"Intro"	1:09
2.	"Change the Beat"	3:04
3.	"Name Dropping"	1:42
4.	"Dead Bent"	2:22
5.	"Go with the Flow"	0:58
6.	"Gas Drawls"	2:41
7.	"Doomsday"	3:22
8.	"Hey!"	3:22
9.	"Accordion"	1:50
10.	"Curls / Great Day"	3:47
11.	"Rhymes Like Dimes"	2:50
12.	"I Hear Voices"	2:04
13.	"My Favorite Ladies"	2:06
14.	"One Beer"	3:33
15.	"Fine Print"	3:51
