= Accordion (Madvillain song) =

2004 song by Madvillain

Song by Madvillain

from the album Madvillainy
- Released: March 23, 2004
- Genre: Underground hip-hop
- Length: 1:58
- Label: Stones Throw Records
- Songwriters: MF Doom; Madlib; Daedelus
- Producer: Madlib

"Accordion" is a song by Madvillain, the hip-hop duo formed by rapper MF Doom and producer Madlib. It is the second song on their collaborative album, Madvillainy (2004).

== Production ==
The song features a cryptic, repeated "accordion" sound overlaid with reflective, introspective lyrics from MF Doom on themes including his own mortality.

== Sample ==
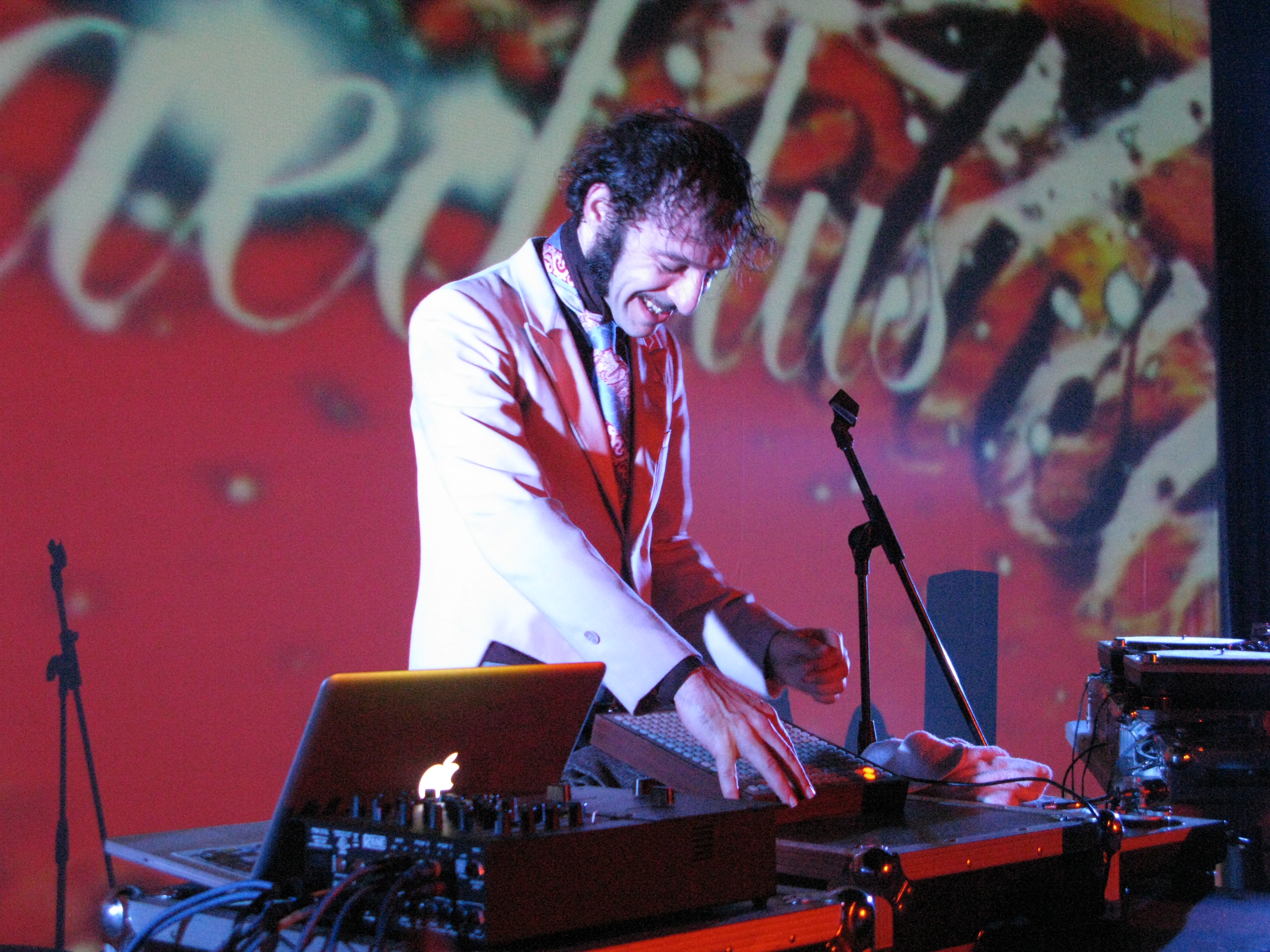
Daedelus, the musician behind the original melody later sampled by Madlib for "Accordion"

While taking a piano class at University of Southern California in the late nineties, Alfred Darlington, known by their stage name Daedelus, came up with the melody that would eventually be sampled as the "accordion" in Madvillain's song. In 2002, Darlington recorded the melody on a Magnus 391 Electric Chord Organ for a song called "Experience" on their debut album, Invention. Although the Magnus 391 wasn't in fact an accordion, its incorporation of a fan design meant that "Pushing on keys sends air blowing across reeds, resulting in the harmonica-like tone. On 'Accordion' and 'Experience,' you can hear the clacking of plastic keys."

Years later, Madlib would stumble upon not just "Experience" but other tracks from Invention as well: "that was the Beat Konducta's process. If he had to listen to an album, he'd do it while connected to a sampler, mining the entire record for the best parts." Eventually, MF Doom and Madlib asked Darlington for permission for the sample. At first, the permission was merely enshrined by a "handshake deal" that didn't formally establish grounds for Daedelus' compensation. As a result, Darlington didn't get paid for the sample, outside of "modest payouts" from when artists like Drake or Trippie Redd used the same beat.

However, Stones Throw Records described the "handshake deal" as an established agreement that Daedelus would "forego taking a share of Madvillain's royalties other than a substantial percentage of film and TV licenses if there were any," of which there were none. Years later, Stones Throw Records and Daedelus would reconcile the "handshake deal" with a formal contract honoring what Daedelus was owed in full plus "one third of the track's publishing."

Later, during live tour shows with Madvillain at the El Rey in Los Angeles and the Great American Music Hall in San Francisco, Daedelus would play an actual accordion for the song. Daedelus also participated in filming for the music video for "Accordion" directed by filmmaker Andrew Gura.

== Critical reception ==
Rolling Stone wrote that the song's "hypnotizing swirl establishes the album's ominous yet inviting tone... Most hip-hop producers wouldn't sample an accordion-like sound for a beat. Most rappers wouldn't choose to rap over that beat, namecheck the instrument in one of its most memorable lines, and name the song after it."

HotNewHipHop stated: "The enigmatic MF DOOM has a particular way about him... Punchlines weave together with surprising connective tissue, and no more is that present than on 'Accordion'... Meanwhile, Madlib brings the titular instrument into the fold, conjuring a slightly feverish backdrop for Doom's relaxed villainy to shine."

In the literary magazine Oxford American, Harmony Holiday considered the lyric's themes of commercial, cultural success. In particular, she stated it "courts the dread and exhilaration of getting on—a pound and a compliment at a time. Getting on as in making it, arriving, breaking in—to the industry, radio play, the club, the cypher, the studio. The alternative is the unspeakable obscurity and alienation of failed musicians." She then goes on to discuss the historic precarity of African American musicians navigating "artistic celebrity" and "the threat of race violence".

After MF Doom's passing on October 31, 2020, NME noted that streams for MF Doom and his collaborative projects "increased significantly from December 31 to January 5", with "Accordion" in particular being streamed 1.4 million times during the isolated week. Both "Accordion" and "All Caps" are considered the "most popular tracks" released by Madvillain.

In Complex, Trey Alston wrote: "Everyone has an MF DOOM story. My discovery happened in the most authentic, aux cord-adjacent way when I was 19. In the middle of an intense ass-whooping in NBA 2K12, my roommate paused the game to skim through songs to put through his hilariously loud speaker, stopping on something sinister set to a thumping bass drum—and an accordion. A rapper emerged with a villainous voice, determined to make me reckon with my time on this Earth and how cheesy Doritos, Fritos, and Cheetos were." Since the song's release, the specific lyric "Doritos, Cheetos, or Fritos" near the end of the song has become a meme among online communities.

Several publications have listed "Accordion" as one of MF Doom's best songs. Others have called it one of Madlib's best beats.

== Other versions ==
In 2005, MF Doom released a live album, Live from Planet X, which features a live rendition of "Accordion" performed in 2004.

Ahead of the 20th anniversary of Madvillainy, the music video for "Accordion", as well as "All Caps", was remastered in 4K by Gura and re-released by Stones Throw Records.

== In other media ==
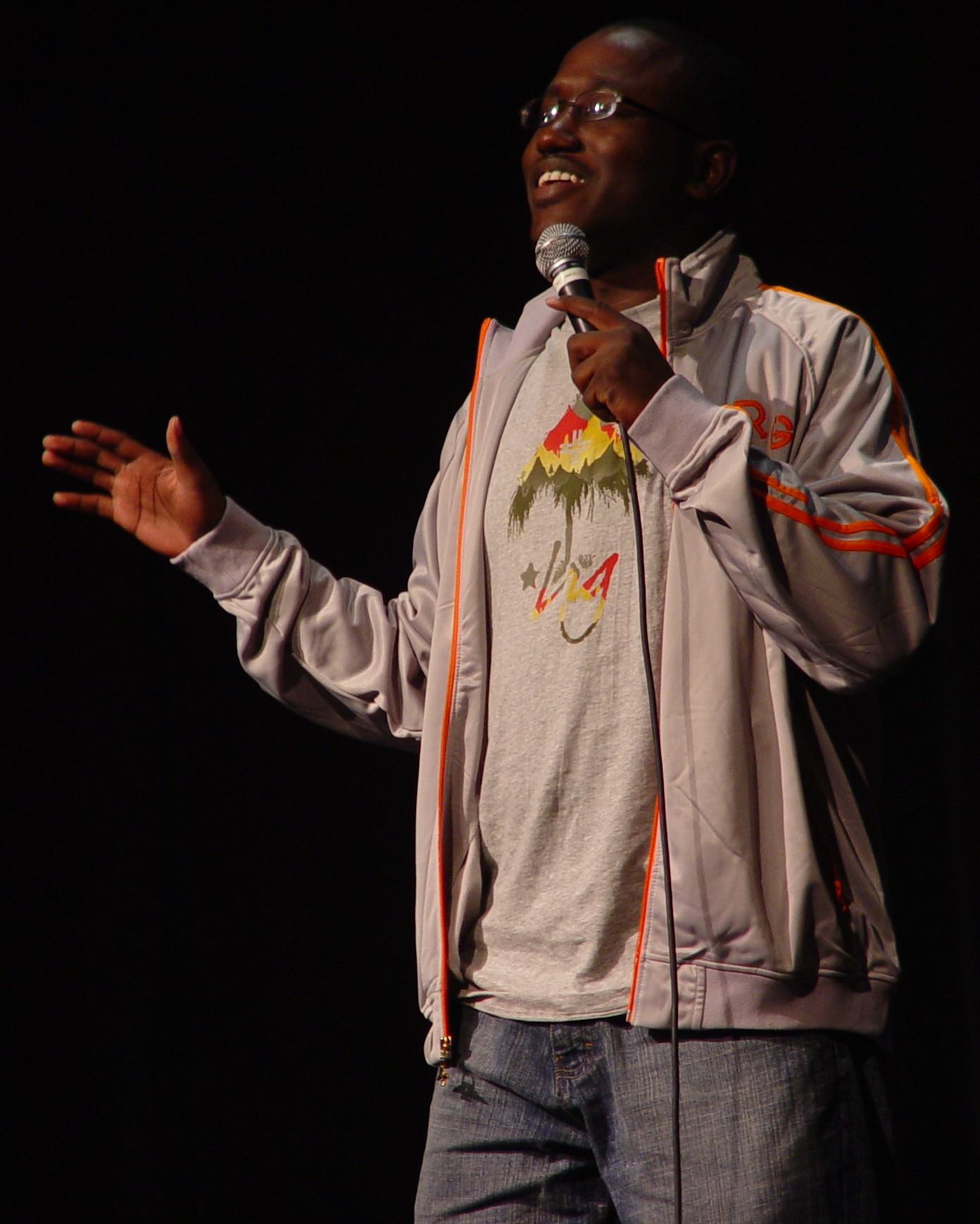
Hannibal Buress covered "Accordion" in the guise of MF Doom at the 2019 Adult Swim Festival

In 2012, singer-songwriter Neneh Cherry and jazz band The Thing collaborated on a debut album called The Cherry Thing. In addition to renditions of songs by Ornette Coleman, Martina Topley-Bird, and others, it also features a cover version of "Accordion". Cherry stated that she didn't originally intend to rap but simply wanted to feel out the song's flow. In the first take, Cherry sang, rapped, and isolated a melody to approach the cover version with.

At the Adult Swim Festival in 2019, rapper Flying Lotus introduced the allegedly real MF Doom to his set, which was really comedian Hannibal Buress wearing the signature MF Doom mask and rapping to "Accordion". Afterward, Flying Lotus unmasked Buress to reveal that they had fooled the audience with MF Doom's appearance.

In May 2024, Marvel Comics released their first Doctor Doom comic since MF Doom's passing. A one-shot, it also marks the first solo book for Doctor Doom since 2000. Written by Jonathan Hickman and illustrated by Sanford Greene, the book's first page references the first two bars of the song: "Living on borrowed time / The clock ticks faster".

== Personnel ==
- MF Doom – writer
- Madlib – writer producer
- Daedelus – writer
