= Fancy Clown =

2004 song by Madvillain featuring Viktor Vaughn

Song by Madvillain featuring Viktor Vaughn

from the album Madvillainy
- Released: March 23, 2004
- Recorded: 2002–2004
- Studio: Bomb Shelter (Mount Washington, Los Angeles)
- Genre: Abstract hip hop; Underground hip-hop
- Length: 1:55
- Label: Stones Throw Records
- Songwriters: MF Doom; Madlib
- Producer: Madlib

"Fancy Clown" is a song by Madvillain, the hip-hop duo consisting of rapper MF Doom and producer Madlib. Featuring MF Doom's alter ego Viktor Vaughn, it appears as the seventeenth track on their 2004 collaborative album, Madvillainy.

== Recording and composition ==
"Fancy Clown" was recorded during the collaborative sessions for Madvillainy between 2002 and 2004, after Stones Throw Records founder Peanut Butter Wolf arranged for MF Doom to relocate from Atlanta to Los Angeles to work with Madlib. Most of the album's instrumentals were created at Madlib's home studio, nicknamed the "Bomb Shelter," in the Mount Washington neighborhood of Los Angeles, where Madlib assembled roughly one hundred beats using minimal hardware consisting of a Boss SP-303 sampler, a portable turntable, and a cassette deck.

Following the unauthorized online leak of an unfinished demo version of Madvillainy fourteen months prior to its official release, Madvillain temporarily halted work on the project before reconvening in late 2003 to complete and re-record vocals for the final tracklist. Consistent with the album's broader sonic aesthetic, Madlib and Doom rejected conventional verse-chorus song structures in favor of a concise, 1-minute-and-55-second vignette built around a single continuous verse without a traditional hook. Recording and mixing were handled by Madlib, MF Doom, and engineer Dave Cooley at Bionic in Los Angeles.

Conceptually, the recording features Daniel Dumile performing entirely in character as Viktor Vaughn—the time-traveling, street-level antihero persona introduced on his 2003 solo album Vaudeville Villain—rather than his primary MF Doom alias. Framed as an angry voicemail left on an answering machine, the narrative depicts Vaughn confronting an ex-girlfriend after learning she has been unfaithful to him with MF Doom himself, referred to within the lyrics as "Metalface" and "tin head". In Madvillainy's sequencing, this alter-ego interplay parallels Madlib's appearance alongside his high-pitched persona Quasimoto on earlier album track "America's Most Blunted".

To establish the song's telephone setting, Madvillain enlisted Los Angeles music journalist and production consultant Walasia "MJ" Shabazz—credited on the album under the name Allah's Reflection—to record the spoken-word voicemail skits that open and close the track. Shabazz, who had previously profiled Madlib for Mass Appeal and served as an informal creative liaison during the Mount Washington sessions, performed the dialogue framing Vaughn's message.

== Sample ==
The instrumental for "Fancy Clown" is built around a pitched-up soul sample of American blues and soul singer Z. Z. Hill's 1975 single "That Ain't the Way You Make Love". Madlib isolated and looped Hill's vocal refrain ("You've been trippin' around, uptown / Wooin' some fancy clown"), from which the song's title is directly derived, retaining the raw vinyl crackle and unpolished texture of the original record on his Boss SP-303 sampler. Rather than functioning merely as background accompaniment, Hill's pleading vocals punctuate the pauses in Viktor Vaughn's verse to reinforce the track's narrative of romantic betrayal.

== Critical reception ==
Upon its release in March 2004, "Fancy Clown" was immediately highlighted by critics as a standout narrative centerpiece of Madvillainy. In a glowing contemporary review for Pitchfork, Rollie Pemberton dubbed the track "hip-hop's first schizophrenic self-diss track" due to Daniel Dumile staging a romantic dispute between his Viktor Vaughn and Metalface aliases. Reviewers from The Guardian and Passion of the Weiss similarly noted how this dual-persona dynamic subverted conventional rap bravado into a self-contained theatrical vignette, with Okayplayer comparing the meta-textual twist to a comic book plotline.

In anniversary retrospectives, critics like Evan Rytlewski of Stereogum praised the song's economy of form and unspooling voicemail structure without a standard chorus, while Will Hagle's Bloomsbury 33⅓ monograph examined the track's narrative architecture alongside Walasia "MJ" Shabazz's spoken-word framing. Following Dumile's passing in late 2020, publications such as The Guardian and Paste reappraised the song as a career benchmark, with Paste ranking it among his top 25 tracks and noting its thematic resonance with the album's closer "Rhinestone Cowboy".

Analysis of Madlib's production—specifically his pitch-shifted sample of Z. Z. Hill's "That Ain't the Way You Make Love"—was highlighted by Passion of the Weiss, Albumism, and Stereogum for contrasting soulful yearning with Vaughn's petty, heartbreak-laced grievances. The track also achieved notable peer acclaim: illustrator and scholar Ted's Draws cited it in Crack Magazine as a foundational beatmaking benchmark, and rapper Yasiin Bey honored the song with an a cappella cover featured by Consequence.

== Personnel ==
Credits adapted from the Madvillainy liner notes.

- MF Doom (as Viktor Vaughn) – vocals, songwriting, recording
- Madlib – production, beats, songwriting, recording
- Allah's Reflection (Walasia "MJ" Shabazz) – additional vocals, production consultation
- Dave Cooley – mixing, mastering, recording engineering
- Peanut Butter Wolf – executive production
- Egon – coordination
