= Madvillainy 2: The Madlib Remix =

2008 remix album by Madvillain

Remix album by Madvillain
- Released: 15 September 2008
- Genre: Hip-hop
- Length: 52:29
- Label: Stones Throw
- Producers: Madlib, MF Doom

Madvillain chronology
Madvillainy (2004)	Madvillainy 2: The Madlib Remix (2008)	Madvillainy Demo Tape (2008)

Madlib chronology
Sujinho (2008)	Madvillainy 2: The Madlib Remix (2008)	WLIB AM: King of the Wigflip (2008)

MF Doom chronology
Special Herbs: The Box Set Vol. 0–9 (2006)	Madvillainy 2: The Madlib Remix (2008)	Born Like This (2009)

Professional ratings
Review scores
Source	Rating
The Phoenix	3.5/4 stars
Pitchfork	5.9/10
Wondering Sound	favorable
XLR8R	8/10

Madvillainy 2: The Madlib Remix is a remix album by American hip-hop duo Madvillain, consisting of rapper MF Doom and producer/rapper Madlib. The album is a re-working created by Madlib of their 2004 debut album, Madvillainy. It was released via Stones Throw Records in 2008.

== Track listing ==
No.	Title	Length
1.	"Pow"	1:50
2.	"No Brain"	2:08
3.	"Pearls"	2:41
4.	"Light of the Past"	2:09
5.	"Boulder Holder"	2:22
6.	"Borrowed Time"	3:00
7.	"Space Ho's Coast to Coast"	3:40
8.	"Invazion" (Interlude)	1:12
9.	"Drainos"	3:26
10.	"Fire in the Hole"	2:34
11.	"Heat Niner"	1:38
12.	"Monkey Suit"	2:18
13.	"Fluid" (Instrumental)	1:20
14.	"Can't Reform Em"	1:56
15.	"Redd Spot" (Interlude)	0:44
16.	"Running Around with Another"	2:49
17.	"Butter King Jewels"	3:38
18.	"Sermon"	2:32
19.	"Roller Coaster Rider" (Instrumental)	1:32
20.	"3.214"	2:03
21.	"Confucious Spot" (Interlude)	0:20
22.	"Never Go Pop"	1:55
23.	"Savage Beast" (Instrumental)	1:21
24.	"Cold One"	3:06
25.	"Cold One" (Reprise)	0:45

== Madvillainy 2: The Box ==
Madvillainy 2: The Box

Box set by Madvillain
- Released: 15 September 2008
- Genre: Hip-hop
- Label: Stones Throw
- Producers: Madlib, MF Doom

On 23 July 2008, Stones Throw announced Madvillainy 2: The Box, a box set containing the Madvillainy 2 CD, the Madvillainy Demo Tape on cassette, Madlib's "One Beer (Drunk Version)" remix on a 7" single, a T-shirt with lyrics from "America's Most Blunted", and a Madvillain comic book continuing the story of the "All Caps" music video.

=== Madvillainy 2: The Madlib Remix ===
No.	Title	Length
1.	"Pow"	1:50
2.	"No Brain"	2:08
3.	"Pearls"	2:41
4.	"Light of the Past"	2:09
5.	"Boulder Holder"	2:22
6.	"Borrowed Time"	3:00
7.	"Space Ho's Coast to Coast"	3:40
8.	"Invazion" (Interlude)	1:12
9.	"Drainos"	3:26
10.	"Fire in the Hole"	2:34
11.	"Heat Niner"	1:38
12.	"Monkey Suit"	2:18
13.	"Fluid" (Instrumental)	1:20
14.	"Can't Reform Em"	1:56
15.	"Redd Spot" (Interlude)	0:44
16.	"Running Around with Another"	2:49
17.	"Butter King Jewels"	3:38
18.	"Sermon"	2:32
19.	"Roller Coaster Rider" (Instrumental)	1:32
20.	"3.14"	2:03
21.	"Confucious Spot" (Interlude)	0:20
22.	"Never Go Pop"	1:55
23.	"Savage Beast" (Instrumental)	1:21
24.	"Cold One"	3:06
25.	"Cold One" (Reprise)	0:45

=== "One Beer (Drunk Version)" ===
A-side
No.	Title	Length
1.	"One Beer" (Drunk Version)	1:52

=== Madvillainy Demo Tape ===
Side 1
No.	Title	Length
1.	"One False Move" ("Great Day" demo)	2:40
2.	"America's Most Blunted"	3:28
3.	"Operation Lifesaver" ("Operation Lifesaver AKA Mint Test" instrumental demo)	1:24
4.	"Figaro"	2:42
5.	"Rainbows"	2:59
6.	"Just for Kicks" ("Meat Grinder" demo)	2:17

Side 2
No.	Title	Length
1.	"Fancy Clown"	3:57
2.	"Shadows of Tomorrow"	3:00
3.	"Money Folder"	4:16
4.	"Stakes" ("Supervillain Theme" demo)	1:29
5.	"All Caps"	2:12
6.	"One False Move" (Instrumental) ("Great Day" instrumental demo)	2:13
