= Coffin nail =

- A cigarette
- A type of nail used for coffins
- "Coffin Nails", a song by MF Doom (under the name Metal Fingers) on the albums Special Herbs, Vols. 4, 5 & 6 and Special Herbs, Vols. 5 & 6

== See also ==
- Nail in the Coffin, a 2019 EP by Aja and Shilow
