= One Beer =

One Beer may refer to:

- "One Beer" (Hardy song), 2020
- "One Beer" (Madvillain song), recorded by MF Doom in 2004
- "One Beer" (Tiny Toon Adventures)
