= Madvillainy 2 =

Studio album by Madvillain
- Released: TBA
- Recorded: 2009–20
- Genre: Hip-hop
- Label: Stones Throw
- Producer: Madlib

Madvillain chronology
Madvillainy Demo Tape (2008)	Madvillainy 2 (TBA)

Madlib chronology
Liberation 2 (2023)	Madvillainy 2 (TBA)

MF Doom chronology
Super What? (2021)	Madvillainy 2 (TBA)

Singles from Madvillainy 2
- 1. "Papermill" Released: May 26, 2010

Madvillainy 2 is the upcoming second studio album by Madvillain, an American hip-hop duo consisting of the rapper MF Doom and the producer Madlib. The duo began work shortly after the release of Madvillainy (2004), but it remained unreleased after Doom died in 2020. In 2023, Madlib said he intended to finish it. It is set to be released by Stones Throw Records, though it has no release date.

== Background ==
The rapper MF Doom and the producer Madlib, as the duo Madvillain, released the album Madvillainy through Stones Throw Records in 2004 to acclaim. Regarded as Doom's magnum opus, it has been listed among the greatest hip-hop albums and as one of the greatest albums. Vice described it as the "shared touchstone" of lofi hip-hop.

== Recording ==
Doom and Madlib's contract for Madvillain also covered two follow-up albums. Recording sessions began shortly after Madvillainy's release, and Stones Throw announced Doom and Madlib were working on a second album in October 2009. Doom worked intermittently, recording only a song or two a year. According to Stereogum, Madlib produced Madvillainy 2: The Madlib Remix (2008) in "an attempt to get Doom excited enough to work on a true follow-up", after he grew tired of waiting for him to record.

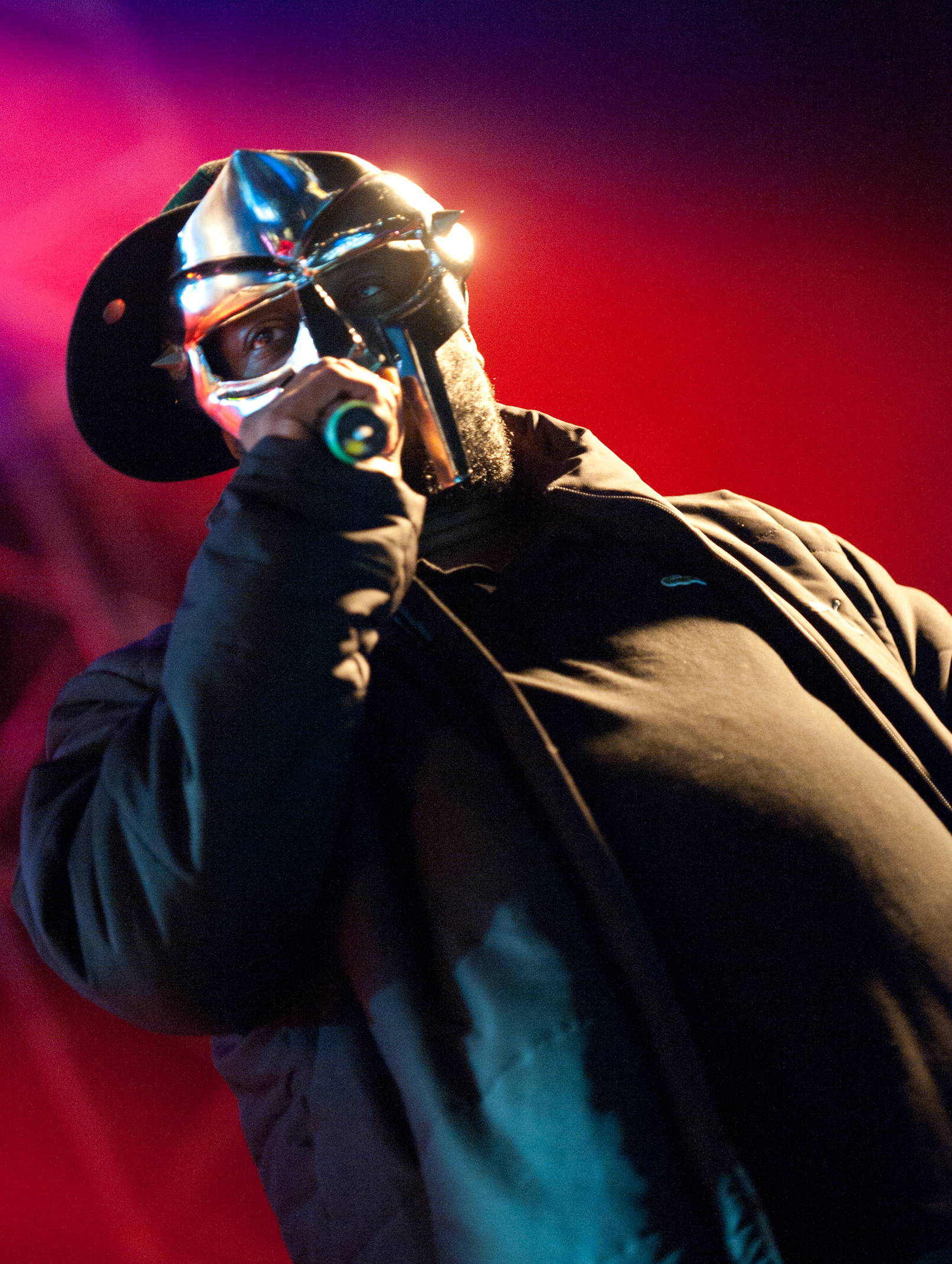
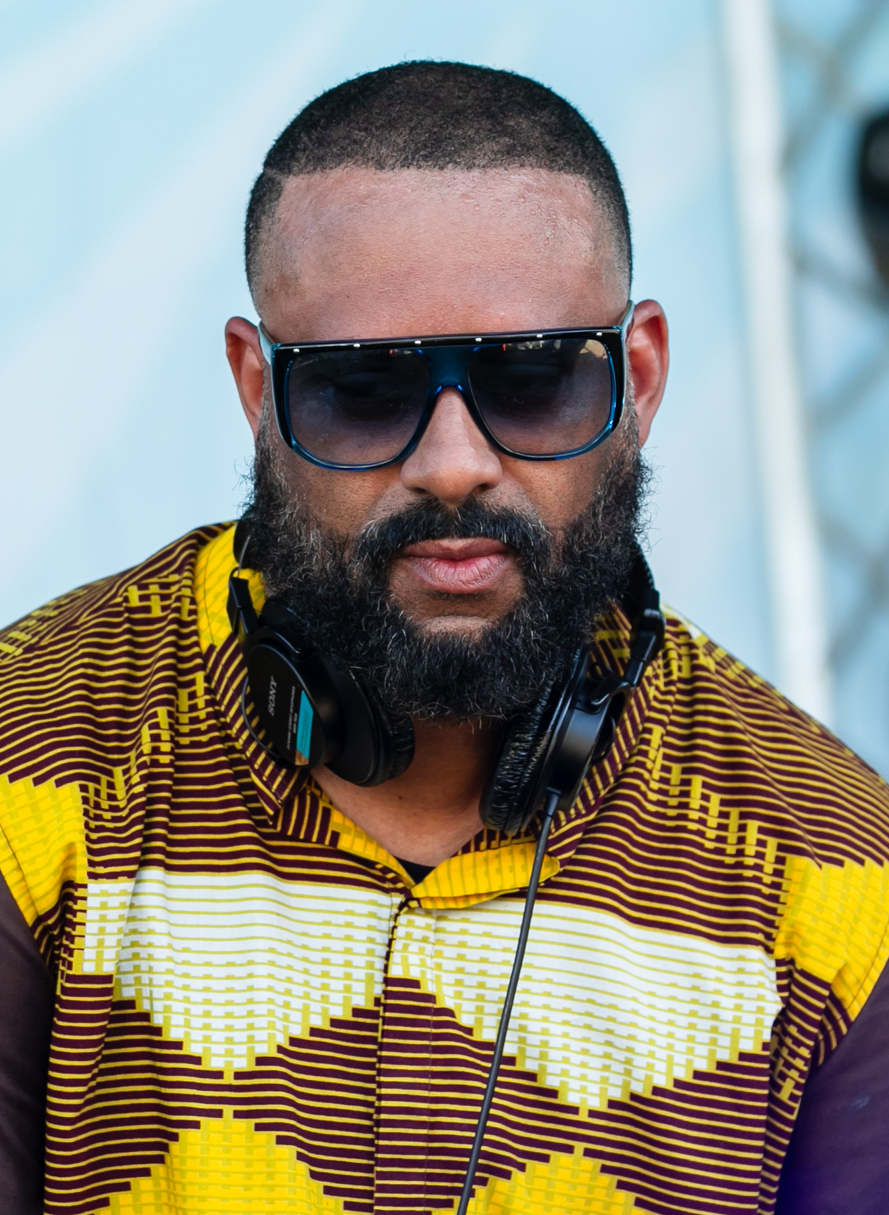
MF Doom (left) and Madlib. Madvillainy 2 remained unreleased after Doom died in 2020.

Doom submitted 11 songs in 2009, but did not want to release them until he recorded more. Madlib and Doom's studios were located in the same building, a former Masonic lodge in Los Angeles, until Doom was denied re-entry to the US and relocated to the UK in 2010. In November 2011, Doom suggested he would finish Madvillainy 2 in two months, and in September 2012, he said he only had to finalize a few tracks. He said a late 2012 release was possible, but it depended on Stones Throw.

In 2013, Madlib expressed doubt that Madvillainy 2 would materialize, as he struggled to maintain contact with Doom after he relocated to the UK. He indicated the release was contingent on Doom recording his verses. Peanut Butter Wolf, Stones Throw's founder, grew frustrated, but "[didn't] wanna be the guy to force creativity or anything ... It's gonna happen when it's gonna happen."

In early 2014, Doom informed Peanut Butter Wolf that he was nearly finished with Madvillainy 2 and preparing to submit it. Peanut Butter Wolf posted a screenshot of Doom's email on Instagram; this angered Doom, known for his reclusiveness, and he did not send any music. That year, Madlib said he would not force Doom to see Madvillainy 2 through: "I just want to know where we are at with it because we recorded like, 10, 13 songs, but out of those we probably only used four... It's not close to finished because it has to be a continuation of the last one. It doesn’t have to be better or worse but it has to be a continuation". Pitchfork reported that most of Madvillainy 2 was stored on Doom's hard drive in London.

In 2019, Doom told Spin that he had recorded enough material with Madlib for multiple albums, and that he was waiting to release Madvillainy 2 until he felt the time was right. It remained unreleased when Doom died in 2020. Peanut Butter Wolf recalled that Doom always said he was "85% done", and Doom's frequent collaborator Kurious said he may have finished recording before his death. In 2023, Madlib said he would finish Madvillainy 2, which comprised around 10 songs. He still considered it a demo, as he and Doom "didn't piece it together or anything and some of them it sounds like [Doom] just did one [vocal] take". Madlib plans to redo many instrumentals, as some were used in other tracks.

== Music ==
The DJ J Rocc played snippets from potential Madvillainy 2 songs at an East Village Radio event in 2009; Pitchfork described them as continuing the free-associative lyricism of the first Madvillainy. Stones Throw's publicist said in 2009 that Madvillainy 2 would feature contributions from Dave Sitek and Mos Def, while Kurious said in 2024 that, to his understanding, he has a guest verse. One session in Los Angeles involved Kanye West, who connected with Doom because he wanted Madlib's production for My Beautiful Dark Twisted Fantasy (2010).

== Release ==
Stones Throw Records released "Papermill", intended as Madvillainy 2's lead single, in 2010. Madvillainy 2 does not have a scheduled release date, though Stones Throw has permission from Doom's family to release it. HotNewHipHop characterized Madvillainy 2 as highly anticipated, owing to the original Madvillainy's reputation as a "masterpiece that defied convention and continues to inspire". Rolling Stone described Madvillainy 2 as "biblically awaited".
