= Special Herbs: The Box Set Vol. 0–9 =

Box set by Metal Fingers
- Released: 24 January 2006
- Genre: Underground hip-hop; instrumental hip-hop
- Length: 186:07
- Label: Nature Sounds
- Producer: Metal Fingers; DJ Subroc

MF Doom chronology
Occult Hymn (2006)	Special Herbs: The Box Set Vol. 0–9 (2006)	Madvillainy 2: The Madlib Remix (2008)

Professional ratings
Review scores
Source	Rating
AllMusic	4/5 stars
Prefix	8/10 stars
Pitchfork	7/10 stars
Sputnikmusic	4.5/5 stars

Special Herbs: The Box Set Vol. 0–9 is a box set by Metal Fingers, released on 24 January 2006. As the last release under the Special Herbs project, the box set was limited to 7,500 copies during its initial release. It was reissued in August 2012, this time with minor artwork changes and all the beats in their original form.

The limited edition box set consists of 3 CDs. Discs 1 and 2 are mixed extracts from the initial ten volumes of the Special Herbs series. Disc 3 is a collection of KMD instrumentals.

== Track listing ==
Disc 1

1. Saffron - 2:04
2. Agrimony - 2:08
3. Pennyroyal - 2:11
4. Safed Musli - 2:10
5. Vinca Rosea - 2:01
6. Arrow Root - 2:11
7. Arabic Gum - 2:14
8. Lavender Buds - 2:13
9. Emblica Officinalis - 2:10
10. Burdock Root - 2:05
11. Zatar - 2:06
12. Benzoin Gum - 2:06
13. White Willow Bark - 2:06
14. Licorice - 2:19
15. Vervain - 1:54
16. Fenugreek - 2:02
17. Bergamot - 2:08
18. Orange Blossoms - 1:58
19. Sarsaparilla - 2:04
20. Bergamont - 2:08
21. Sumac Berries - 2:05
22. Calamus - 2:06
23. Coffin Nails - 1:59
24. Fo-Ti - 2:30
25. Podina - 2:04
26. Coriander - 2:02
27. Dragon's Blood Resin - 2:09
28. Kava Kava Root - 1:55
29. Camphor - 1:51
30. Untitled (Meditation) - 2:15
31. Shallots - 2:04
32. Elder Blossoms - 1:49
33. Valerian Root - 2:15
34. High John - 2:22
35. Coltsfoot Leaf - 2:07
36. Charnsuka - 2:22

Disc 2

1. Styrax Gum - 2:05
2. Jasmine Blossoms - 2:08
3. Mandrake - 2:17
4. Orris Root Powder - 2:02
5. Monosodium Glumate - 2:13
6. Blood Root - 2:12
7. Black Snake Root - 2:12
8. Devil's Shoestring - 2:16
9. Passion Flower - 2:23
10. Red #40 - 2:06
11. Star Anis - 2:00
12. Horehound - 2:14
13. Wormwood - 1:49
14. Yellow Dock - 2:19
15. Nettle Leaves - 2:10
16. Lemon Grass - 2:35
17. Dragon's Blood - 2:10
18. Datura Stramonium - 2:07
19. Cedar - 2:13
20. Mullein - 2:02
21. Four Thieves Vinegar - 2:06
22. Myrtle Leaf - 2:04
23. Buckeyes - 2:15
24. Coca Leaf - 2:05
25. Mugwort - 2:06
26. Galangal Root - 2:05
27. All Spice - 2:05
28. Spikenard - 1:46
29. Lovage - 2:14
30. Clinquefoil - 2:10
31. Eucalyptus - 2:10
32. Hyssop - 2:11
33. Myrrh - 2:04
34. Patchouly Leaves - 2:11
35. Chrysanthemum Flowers - 2:07
36. Peach Extract - 2:18

Disc 3

1. Who Me? - 3:36
2. Plumskinzz - 4:51
3. Humrush - 3:26
4. Garbage Day #3 - 3:32
5. Constipated Monkey - 2:56
6. Contact Blitt - 2:34
7. What a Nigga Know? - 3:34
8. Get-U-Now - 5:12
9. Smokin' That Shit! - 4:39
10. It Sounded Like a Roc! - 4:50
