= Gazzillion Ear =

2010 single by MF Doom

Single by MF Doom

from the album Born Like This
- Released: January 2010
- Recorded: 2009–2010
- Genre: Hip-hop
- Length: 4:15
- Label: Lex Records
- Songwriter: MF Doom
- Producers: MF Doom; Dr. Who Dat?; J Dilla; Jneiro Jarel; Thom Yorke

MF Doom singles chronology
| "Vomit" (2006) | "Gazzillion Ear" (2010) | "Papermill" (2010) |

"Gazzillion Ear" is a single by the British-American hip-hop artist MF Doom, released through the British independent label Lex Records. It contains the main single produced by J Dilla and remixes by Thom Yorke, Dr. Who Dat?, Jneiro Jarel and Dave Sitek. The main single was featured two months later on March 24, 2010, as the second track on MF Doom's 2009 album Born Like This. Yorke released a second remix of "Gazzillion Ear", the "Man on Fire" remix, in 2021, after MF Doom's death.

== Track listing ==
=== CD single ===
| No. | Title | Producer(s) | Length |
|---|---|---|---|
| 1. | "Gazzillion Ear" | J Dilla | 4:15 |
| 2. | "Gazzillion Ear" (Thom Yorke remix) | Thom Yorke | 4:13 |
| 3. | "Gazzillion Ear" (Dr. Who Dat? remix) | Dr. Who Dat? | 3:53 |
| 4. | "Gazzillion Ear" (Jneiro Jarel and Dave Sitek remix) | Jneiro Jarel; Dave Sitek | 3:29 |
| 5. | "The.Green.Whore.Net" (Bonus beat) | MF Doom | 1:18 |
| Total length: | | | 17:08 |

=== 12" vinyl single ===
A-side

| No. | Title | Producer(s) | Length |
|---|---|---|---|
| 1. | "Gazzillion-Ear" | J Dilla | 4:11 |
| 2. | "Gazzillion-Ear" (Thom Yorke remix) | Thom Yorke | 4:12 |
| 3. | "Gazzillion-Ear" (Dr. Who Dat? remix) | Dr. Who Dat? | 3:56 |
| 4. | "Gazzillion-Ear" (Jneiro Jarel and Dave Sitek remix) | Jneiro Jarel; Dave Sitek | 3:28 |
| 5. | "Gazzillion-Ear-Apella" (Acapella) | | 4:08 |
| 6. | "Gazzillion-Ear" (Instrumental) | J Dilla | 4:10 |

B-side

| No. | Title | Producer(s) | Length |
|---|---|---|---|
| 1. | "Gazzillion-Ear" (Thom Yorke remix) (Instrumental) | Thom Yorke | 4:13 |
| 2. | "Gazzillion-Ear" (Dr. Who Dat? remix) (Instrumental) | Dr. Who Dat? | 3:53 |
| 3. | "Gazzillion-Ear" (Jneiro Jarel and Dave Sitek remix) (Instrumental) | Jneiro Jarel | 3:29 |
| 4. | "The.Green.Whore.Net." (Bonus beat) | Doom | 1:18 |
| 5. | "Get.The.Feta." | Doom | 0:41 |
| 6. | "Kat-Girl Real-Time" | | 0:36 |
