= Special Blends, Vol. 1 & 2 =

Compilation album by MF Doom
- Released: 2004
- Genre: Alternative hip hop, underground hip hop
- Length: 87:01
- Label: Metal Face Records
- Producer: The Super Villain

Alternative cover
- Cover used for reissues since 2016.

Special Blends, Vol. 1 & 2 is a compilation album released by MF Doom, compiling the remix albums Special Blends, Vol. 1 and Special Blends, Vol. 2. Each track pairs an acapella version of a famous hip hop song by other MCs and rappers with instrumentals from Doom's Special Herbs albums. Mixed by Doom himself, the collection incorporates vocals from a wide range of iconic records.

The album was reissued on vinyl on June 17, 2016 on Metal Face Records in standard 2xLP vinyl format, as well as a deluxe version inside a custom-printed burlap bag.

== Track listing ==
Special Blends, Vol. 1

Remix album by MF Doom
- Released: 2004
- Genre: Alternative hip hop, underground hip hop
- Length: 46:16
- Label: Metal Face Records
- Producer: The Super Villain

All tracks mixed by The Super Villain.

=== Disc 1 (Special Blends, Vol. 1) ===
1. "Pounds Up (MF Doom Special Blend)" - 3:43
  - M.O.P.
  - Contains "Red #40" from Special Herbs, Vol. 2
2. "Off the Books/Just To Get A Rep (MF Doom Special Blend)" - 3:31
  - Beatnuts, Gangstarr featuring Big Pun and Cuban Link
  - Contains "Nettle Leaves" from Special Herbs, Vol. 2
3. "Mighty Healthy/That's Me (MF Doom Special Blend)" - 4:41
  - Ghostface Killah, Cam'ron
  - Contains "Mullein" from Special Herbs, Vol. 2
4. "You're Playing Yourself (MF Doom Special Blend)" - 2:43
  - Jeru The Damaja
  - Contains "Mugwort" from Special Herbs, Vol. 2
5. "Latoya (MF Doom Special Blend)" - 2:52
  - Just-Ice
  - Contains "All Spice" from Special Herbs, Vol. 2
6. "On and On (MF Doom Special Blend)" - 3:58
  - Erykah Badu
  - Contains "Lovage" from Special Herbs, Vol. 2
7. "Top Billin' (MF Doom Special Blend)" - 1:58
  - Audio Two
  - Contains "Eucalyptus" from Special Herbs, Vol. 2
8. "Shook Ones (MF Doom Special Blend)" - 3:26
  - Mobb Deep
  - Contains "Saffron" from Special Herbs, Vol. 1
9. "One Love (MF Doom Special Blend)" - 3:51
  - Nas
  - Contains "Arrow Root" from Special Herbs, Vol. 1
10. "Brown Sugar (MF Doom Special Blend)" - 3:20
  - D'Angelo
  - Contains "Zatar" from Special Herbs, Vol. 1
11. "Ante Up (MF Doom Special Blend)" - 3:26
  - M.O.P.
  - Contains "Fenugreek" from Special Herbs, Vol. 1
12. "Stakes Is High (MF Doom Special Blend)" - 1:59
  - De La Soul
  - Contains "Sumac Berries" from Special Herbs, Vol. 1
13. "Paper Thin (MF Doom Special Blend)" - 2:10
  - MC Lyte
  - Contains "Shallots" from Special Herbs, Vol. 1
14. "Criminology (MF Doom Special Blend)" - 2:24
  - Raekwon featuring Ghostface Killah
  - Contains "Charnsuka" from Special Herbs, Vol. 1
15. "Bring The Noise (MF Doom Special Blend)" - 1:35
  - Public Enemy featuring Anthrax
  - Contains "Monosodium Glutimate" from Special Herbs, Vol. 1

=== Disc 2 (Special Blends, Vol. 2) ===
Special Blends, Vol. 2

Remix album by MF Doom
- Released: 2004
- Genre: Alternative hip hop, underground hip hop
- Length: 41:44
- Label: Metal Face Records
- Producer: The Super Villain

1. "Hustlin' (MF Doom Special Blend)" - 2:10
  - Smoothe Da Hustler featuring Rhyme Recca, and Trigga tha Gambler
  - Contains "Agrimony" from Special Herbs, Vol. 3
2. "Shit's Real/Stick To Ya Gunz (MF Doom Special Blend)" - 6:18
  - Mic Geronimo and M.O.P. featuring Kool G Rap
  - Contains "Benzoin Gum" and "Bergamot Wild" from Special Herbs, Vol. 3
3. "Mad Sick (MF Doom Special Blend)" - 3:52
  - Now Born Click
  - Contains "Calamus Root" from Special Herbs, Vol. 3
4. "The Glock (MF Doom Special Blend)" - 3:41
  - Lil Vicious
  - Contains "Dragon's Blood Resin" from Special Herbs, Vol. 3
5. "We Run Things (MF Doom Special Blend)" - 2:47
  - Da Bush Babees
  - Contains "Elder Blossoms" from Special Herbs, Vol. 3
6. "Hell On Earth (MF Doom Special Blend)" - 2:35
  - Mobb Deep
  - Contains "Styrax Gum" from Special Herbs, Vol. 3
7. "Slingin' Bass (MF Doom Special Blend)" - 3:38
  - Grand Daddy I.U.
  - Contains "Pennyroyal" and "Lavender Buds" from Special Herbs, 4,5,6
8. "Method Man (MF Doom Special Blend)" - 2:17
  - Method Man
  - Contains "White Willow Bark" from Special Herbs, 4,5,6
9. "Hazy Shade Of Criminal (MF Doom Special Blend)" - 2:01
  - Public Enemy
  - Contains "Orange Blossoms" from Special Herbs, 4,5,6
10. "Ryde Or Die (MF Doom Special Blend)" - 3:06
  - Ruff Ryders
  - Contains "Coffin Nails" from Special Herbs, 4,5,6
11. "(You're Puttin') A Rush On Me (MF Doom Special Blend)" - 4:07
  - Stephanie Mills
  - Contains "Kava Kava Root" from Special Herbs, 4,5,6
12. "Get Your Roll On (MF Doom Special Blend)" - 4:52
  - Big Tymers
  - Contains "Valerian Root" from Special Herbs, 4,5,6
