= Special Herbs, Vol. 5 & 6 =

Studio album by Metal Fingers
- Released: 23 March 2004
- Recorded: Various dates
- Genres: Hip-hop, instrumental hip-hop
- Length: 47:29
- Label: Nature Sounds
- Producer: Metal Fingers

Metal Fingers chronology
Special Herbs, 4,5,6 (2003)	Special Herbs, Vol. 5 & 6 (2004)	Special Herbs, Vol. 7 & 8 (2004)

Special Herbs, Vol. 5 & 6 is an album of instrumental works released by MF Doom under the Metal Fingers moniker. As with the other installments of the Special Herbs series, each track is named for a herb or similar flora.

This album, aside from the bonus tracks, also forms the last thirteen tracks of the Metal Fingers series' previous volume, Special Herbs, 4,5,6, due to the different record labels the various albums in the series were released on. This is the last volume of the series with such track listing overlaps.

== Track listing ==
All tracks produced by MF Doom under his Metal Fingers alias.

1. "Pennyroyal" – 3:11
2. "Lavender Buds" – 3:05
3. "White Willow Bark" – 4:24
4. "Orange Blossoms" – 1:59
5. "Coffin Nails" – 2:56
6. "Kava Kava Root" – 4:07
7. "Valerian Root" – 4:53
8. "Jasmine Blossoms" – 2:58
9. "Black Snake Root" – 3:44
10. "Horehound" – 3:07
11. "Dragons Blood" – 4:07
12. "Myrtle Leaf" – 5:16
13. "Patchouly Leaves" – 3:46
14. "My Favorite Ladies" (bonus track)
15. "All Outta Ale (live)" (bonus multimedia track)
16. "Special Blends DJ Set (live)" (bonus multimedia track)
17. MF Doom Photo Gallery (multimedia extra)

== Other versions ==
- "Pennyroyal" by Joey Badass from the mixtape 1999 used the instrumental "Pennyroyal" as its beat.
- "Lavender Buds" is a remix of "April Showers" by The Blackbyrds from the album Flying Start.
- "White Willow Bark" is a remix of "Love Is Love" by The Blackbyrds from the album Flying Start and was used in "Chicago" by Capital Steez from the mixtape AmeriKKKan Korruption.
- "Orange Blossoms" is an instrumental version of "The Instructor" by B.I., from the Spark the Sound split 7" with Chris Craft featuring MF Doom. It is also used on "Underwater" by Ghostface Killah, from the album Fishscale.
- "Coffin Nails" is an instrumental version of "Rapp Snitch Knishes" by MF Doom featuring Mr. Fantastik, from the album Mm..Food. It is also used on "Ryde Or Die (MF Doom Special Blend)" by Ruff Ryders, from the MF Doom remix compilation album Special Blends, Vol. 1 & 2.
- "Kava Kava Root" is an instrumental version of "Anarchist Bookstore Pt. 1" by MC Paul Barman, from the album Paullelujah!. It is also used on "Stress Box" by MF Grimm, from the MF Doom collaboration album Special Herbs and Spices Volume 1.
- "Valerian Root" is an instrumental version of "Anarchist Bookstore Pt. 2" by MC Paul Barman, from the album Paullelujah!.
- "Jasmine Blossoms" is an instrumental version of "Hoe Cakes" by MF Doom, from the album Mm..Food.
- "Horehound" is an instrumental version of "Kookies" by MF Doom, from the album Mm..Food. It is also used on "Tonight's Show" by MF Grimm featuring Invisible Man and Lord Smog, from Special Herbs and Spices Volume 1.
- "Dragon's Blood" is an instrumental version of "Fig Leaf Bi-Carbonate" by MF Doom from the album Mm..Food. It is also used on "1000 Degrees" by MF Grimm, from Special Herbs and Spices Volume 1. It is also used on "Guns N' Razors" by Ghostface Killah from the album More Fish.
- "Myrtle Leaf" is an instrumental version of "Monster Zero" by King Geedorah, from the album Take Me to Your Leader.
- "Patchouly Leaves" is an instrumental version of "Operation: Greenbacks" by MF Doom featuring Megalon, from Operation: Doomsday.
- "Black Snake Root" contains samples from “Lowdown” by Boz Scaggs.
