= One Beer (Madvillain song) =

Song by Madvillain

Single by Madvillain

from the album Mm..Food
- Released: 30 March 2004
- Genre: Alternative hip-hop
- Length: 2:51 (single version); 4:19 (album version); 2:13 (video version)
- Label: Stones Throw
- Songwriter: MF Doom
- Producer: Madlib

Madvillain singles chronology
"All Caps" (2004)	"One Beer" (2004)	"One Beer (Drunk Version)" (2008)

Music video
- "One Beer" on YouTube

"One Beer" is a song recorded by American hip-hop duo Madvillain, originally intended for inclusion on their debut studio album Madvillainy. The song instead ended up being used on MF Doom's 2004 album Mm..Food, credited to MF Doom rather than Madvillain. "One Beer" was released as a limited-press 7" single in 2004, given away by select online retailers with copies of Madvillainy. An animated music video was released on 16 November 2018, 14 years after Mm..Food's release.

== Background ==
"One Beer" was originally recorded for Madvillainy, but Doom and Madlib felt it did not fit the record and decided to leave it off. 1000 copies were pressed to 7" vinyl and given away by select online retailers with copies of Madvillainy a week after the album's release. The song samples French jazz-funk band Cortex's 1975 song "Huit Octobre 1971".

== Music video ==
On 16 November 2018, the 14th anniversary of Mm..Food's release, Rhymesayers Entertainment released an animated music video for "One Beer", created by Philadelphia visual artist Anhia Zaira Santana, also known as "Distortedd". The Japanese anime-styled video features multiple characters as Cyclopes fighting over the last can of beer, including Doom himself and Madlib's alter ego Lord Quas. In the video, a young Cyclops girl drinks from a can of beer, and later takes a psychedelic mushroom dropped by Lord Quas, sending her into a drug-induced hallucination where she believes she is shrunken down and chased by a three-eyed cat. At the end of the video she is rescued by Doom and Lord Quas in a UFO. The video's style is highly reminiscent of early 2000's Flash and Newgrounds animations.

Santana said of the collaboration, "Dream come true. I collaborated with the GOAT, my favorite artist/best artist of all time".

== Track listing ==
A-side
No.	Title	Length
1.	"One Beer"	2:51

B-side

No.	Title	Length

Hookie & Baba, Robot and Chimp ...Friends (Etching by Jeff Jank)

== Personnel ==
Credits are adapted from the single's label.

- Doom – MC
- Madlib – beats

== Certifications ==
Certifications for "One Beer"
Region	Certification	Certified units/sales
United States (RIAA)	Gold	500,000^{‡}
^{‡} Sales+streaming figures based on certification alone.

== Drunk Version ==
"One Beer (Drunk Version)"
- Official digital single cover

Single by Madvillain

from the album Madvillainy 2: The Box
- Released: 15 September 2008 (as part of Madvillainy 2: The Box)
- Recorded: Late 2003
- Genre: Alternative hip-hop
- Length: 1:52
- Label: Stones Throw
- Songwriter: MF Doom
- Producer: Madlib

Madvillain singles chronology
"One Beer" (2004)	"One Beer (Drunk Version)" (2008)	"Papermill" (2010)

Music video
- "One Beer (Drunk Version)" on YouTube

"One Beer" was originally recorded over the beat used by Madlib and J Dilla for the song "No Games" on the Jaylib album Champion Sound. Madlib attempted to remix the track so that it could be used for Madvillainy, but the results were deemed "too weird" and it was left off the album. The only copy of this remix, dubbed the "Drunk Version" by label Stones Throw, was burned to a CD and then lost in Madlib's studio. The CD was re-discovered in 2005 and later included with Madvillainy 2: The Box as a 12" single.

A-side
No.	Title	Length
1.	"One Beer" (Drunk Version)	1:52
