= Papermill (song) =

2010 single by Madvillain

Single by Madvillain

from the album Adult Swim Singles Program 2010
- Released: 26 May 2010
- Genre: Alternative hip-hop
- Length: 1:45
- Label: Stones Throw
- Songwriter: MF Doom
- Producer: Madlib

Madvillain singles chronology
"One Beer (Drunk Version)" (2008)	"Papermill" (2010)

"Papermill" is a song recorded by American hip-hop duo Madvillain. It was released 26 May 2010 as part of the Adult Swim Singles Program.

== Background ==
"Papermill" was intended to serve as the first single from Madvillain's still-unreleased followup to Madvillainy. According to label Stones Throw, the album had been in progress since 2009. The song was the second single released in the 2010 Adult Swim Singles Program. The Madlib-produced beat samples the chopped-up europop song "Irgendwie" by the German Jazzrock band Blonker from a 1978 live recording. Adult Swim also released some behind-the-scenes videos to go along with the song of Madlib talking about his creative process while taste-testing some Intelligentsia coffee branded with his name.

== Reception ==
Ethan Scholl of Beats Per Minute gave "Papermill" a score of 8 out of 10, saying "everyone should be able to admire the effort and spirit of two of two [sic] of the only hip hop artists willing to experiment working together once again." UK music publication Fact called the song "a fun appetiser for a future Madvillain full length to come." Luke Slater of Drowned in Sound was more critical of the track, noting that he felt Doom was rapping out of time with the beat.

== Track listing ==
No.	Title	Length
1.	"Papermill"	1:45

== Personnel ==
Credits are adapted from Stones Throw's website.

- Doom – MC
- Madlib – beat
