= Special Herbs, 4,5,6 =

Studio album by Metal Fingers
- Released: 24 November 2003
- Recorded: Various dates
- Genres: Hip-hop, instrumental hip-hop
- Length: 73:30
- Labels: Shaman Work; Metal Face
- Producer: Metal Fingers

Metal Fingers chronology
Special Herbs, Vol. 4 (2003)	Special Herbs, 4,5,6 (2003)	Special Herbs, Vol. 5 & 6 (2004)

Special Herbs, 4,5,6 is an album of instrumental works released by MF Doom under the Metal Fingers moniker. As with the other installments of the Special Herbs series, each track is named for a herb (or similar flora) or herbal preparation, with the exception of "Coffin Nails" which could refer either to a slang term for tobacco cigarettes or literally to nails from coffins, which have been traditionally used in conjunction with certain herbs in the performance of ceremonial magic rituals.

The album's title is slightly misleading, in that it is not an entirely new volume: the second part of the previous installment in the Metal Fingers series (confusingly also called Special Herbs, Vol. 4 but also commonly known as Special Herbs, Vol. 3 & 4; it is this latter "Volume 4" that is duplicated), appears again here as the first eight tracks of Special Herbs, 4,5,6. The difference in record labels on which the various albums were released explains this anomaly, similar to the earlier doublings of Vol. 2 and Vol. 4. After this volume, the numbering of the series becomes more consistent, and there are no such overlapping tracks.

The original artwork for both the CD and vinyl versions contained depictions of Marvel Comics' Doctor Doom character (from the Fantastic Four). The original album with this artwork is now deleted but can surface from time to time on online auction sites. An updated cover was created for the album featuring MF Doom's own face.

== Track listing ==
1. "Blood Root" – 3:00
  - Produced by Metal Fingers
2. "Star Anis" – 3:28
  - Produced by Metal Fingers
3. "Lemon Grass" – 4:21
  - Produced by Metal Fingers
4. "Four Thieves Vinegar" – 3:34
  - Produced by Metal Fingers
5. "Galangal Root" – 2:33
  - Produced by Metal Fingers
6. "Spikenard" – 3:33
  - Produced by Metal Fingers
7. "Cinquefoil" – 2:59
  - Produced by Metal Fingers
8. "Hyssop" – 2:33
  - Produced by Metal Fingers
9. "Pennyroyal" – 3:11
  - Produced by Metal Fingers
10. "Lavender Buds" – 3:05
  - Produced by Metal Fingers
11. "White Willow Bark" – 4:24
  - Produced by Metal Fingers
12. "Orange Blossoms" – 1:59
  - Produced by Metal Fingers
13. "Coffin Nails" – 2:56
  - Produced by Metal Fingers
14. "Kava Kava Root" – 4:07
  - Produced by Metal Fingers
15. "Valerian Root" – 4:53
  - Produced by Metal Fingers
16. "Jasmine Blossoms" – 2:58
  - Produced by Metal Fingers
17. "Black Snake Root" – 3:44
  - Produced by Metal Fingers
18. "Horehound" – 3:07
  - Produced by Metal Fingers
19. "Dragons Blood" – 4:07
  - Produced by Metal Fingers
20. "Myrtle Leaf" – 5:16
  - Produced by Metal Fingers
21. "Patchouly Leaves" – 3:46
  - Produced by Metal Fingers

== Other versions ==
- "Arabic Gum" is an instrumental version of "Space Tech Banana Clip" by Babbletron, from the album Mechanical Royalty.
- "Four Thieves Vinegar" is an instrumental version of "Escape From Monsta Isle" by Rodan, Megalon, Kong, & Spiega, from the Monsta Island Czars album Escape from Monsta Island!.
- "Galangal Root" is an instrumental version of "Dead Bent" by MF Doom, from the album Operation: Doomsday.
- "Calamus Root" is an instrumental version of "Gas Drawls" by MF Doom, from the album Operation: Doomsday.
- "Spikenard" is an instrumental version of "Popcorn" by KMD, from the album Black Bastards.
- "Orange Blossoms" is an instrumental version of "The Instructor" by B.I., from the Spark the Sound split 7" with Chris Craft featuring MF Doom. It is also used by Ghostface Killah on "Underwater" from the album Fishscale.
- "Kava Kava Root" is an instrumental version of "Anarchist Bookstore Pt. 1" by MC Paul Barman, from the album Paullelujah!. It is also used on "Stress Box" by MF Grimm, from the MF Doom collaboration album Special Herbs and Spices Volume 1.
- "Valerian Root" is an instrumental version of "Anarchist Bookstore Pt. 2" by MC Paul Barman, from Paullelujah!.
- "Jasmine Blossoms" is an instrumental version of "Hoe Cakes" by MF Doom, from the album Mm..Food.
- "Horehound" is an instrumental version of "Kookies" by MF Doom, from the same album. It is also used on "Tonight's Show" by MF Grimm featuring Invisible Man and Lord Smog, from Special Herbs and Spices Volume 1.
- "Dragon's Blood" is an instrumental version of "Fig Leaf Bi-Carbonate" by MF Doom from Mm..Food. It is also used on "1000 Degrees" by MF Grimm, from Special Herbs and Spices Volume 1; and also on "Gunz N' Razors" by Ghostface Killah featuring Trife Da God, Cappadonna and Killa Sin, from the album More Fish.
- "Myrtle Leaf" is an instrumental version of "Monster Zero" by King Geedorah, from the album Take Me to Your Leader.
- "Patchouly Leaves" is an instrumental version of "Operation: Greenbacks" by MF Doom featuring Megalon, from the album Operation: Doomsday.
- "Coffin Nails" is an instrumental version of "Rapp Snitch Knishes" by MF Doom featuring Mr. Fantastik, from the album Mm..Food.
