= Born like This =

Studio album by Doom
- Released: 24 March 2009
- Genre: Hip-hop
- Length: 40:34
- Label: Lex
- Producers: Doom; Mr. Chop; J Dilla; Jake One; Madlib

MF Doom chronology
Madvillainy 2: The Madlib Remix (2008)	Born like This (2009)	Unexpected Guests (2009)

Singles from Born like This
- 1. "Gazzillion Ear" Released: January 2010

Born like This (stylized in all caps) is the sixth and final solo studio album by British-American rapper and producer MF Doom. It was released under the pseudonym "Doom" on 24 March 2009, through Lex Records.

== Content ==
In addition to tracks produced by MF Doom, the album includes production by frequent collaborator Madlib, as well as J Dilla. The album title is borrowed from Charles Bukowski's poem "Dinosauria, We", which employs it as a cadence. The track "Cellz" opens with a sampled recording of Bukowski reading the poem.

== Chart performance ==
It debuted at number 52 on the Billboard 200 chart, having sold 10,895 copies as of 29 March 2009.

== Critical reception ==
Professional ratings
Aggregate scores
Source	Rating
Metacritic	77/100
Review scores
Source	Rating
AllMusic	3/5 stars
The A.V. Club	A−
Consequence of Sound	A−
Drowned in Sound	7/10
HipHopDX	3.5/5
The Observer	4/5 stars
Paste	76/100
Pitchfork	8.0/10
Slant Magazine	3.5/5 stars
URB	3.5/5 stars

At Metacritic, which assigns a weighted average score out of 100 to reviews from mainstream critics, Born like This received an average score of 77% based on 21 reviews, indicating "generally favorable reviews".

Born Like This ranked at number 4 on The Skinny's "2009: A Year in Records" list. Pitchfork included it in their best albums of 2009, placing it at number 48.

== Track listing ==
No.	Title	Writer(s)	Producer(s)	Length
1.	"Supervillain Intro"	Daniel Dumile; Kelvin Mercer; Coz Littler	MF Doom; Mr. Chop	0:54
2.	"Gazzillion Ear"	Dumile; James Yancey	J Dilla	4:12
3.	"Ballskin"	Dumile	Jake One	1:30
4.	"Yessir!" (featuring Raekwon)	Dumile	MF Doom	2:34
5.	"Absolutely"	Dumile; Otis Jackson Jr.	Madlib	2:43
6.	"Rap Ambush"	Dumile	Jake One	1:28
7.	"Lightworks"	Dumile; Yancey; Raymond Scott	J Dilla	1:52
8.	"Batty Boyz"	Dumile	MF Doom	3:16
9.	"Angelz" (featuring Tony Starks)	Dumile	MF Doom	3:07
10.	"Cellz"	Dumile; Littler	MF Doom; Mr. Chop	4:21
11.	"Still Dope" (featuring Empress Stahhr tha Femcee)	Dumile	MF Doom	2:40
12.	"Microwave Mayo"	Dumile	Jake One	2:26
13.	"More Rhymin'"	Dumile	Jake One	1:39
14.	"That's That"	Dumile; Galt MacDermot	MF Doom	2:15
15.	"Supervillainz" (featuring Kurious, Mobonix, Posdnous, Prince Paul & Slug)	Dumile; Littler; Mercer; Maurice White; Jorge Alvarez; Paul Huston; Sean Daley	MF Doom; Mr. Chop	2:49
16.	"Bumpy's Message" (featuring Bumpy Knuckles)	Dumile; Littler; Daley	MF Doom; Mr. Chop	1:36
17.	"Thank Yah"	Dumile	MF Doom	1:14
Total length:				40:34

Sample credits and additional notes

- "Gazzillion Ear" samples "Trouble" (performed) by Brenton Wood and "Theme from Midnight Express" by Giorgio Moroder. The instrumental track for "Gazzillion Ear" is also based on "Dig It" and "Phantom of the Synths", both by J Dilla.
- "Yessir!" samples "UFO" by ESG.
- "Absolutely" samples a Horn section from "Creep" by TLC. It also uses a vocal sample from "Sun Goddess" by Ramsey Lewis.
- "Lightworks" is based on J Dilla's version from the album Donuts, and samples "Lightworks" by Raymond Scott.
- "Angelz" was recorded in 2006.
- "Cellz" samples "Dinosauria, We" by Charles Bukowski.
- "Cellz" is split into two tracks: "Cellz, Pt.1" and "Cellz, Pt.2" on the redux version.
- "That's That" samples "Princess Gika" by Galt MacDermot; it also contains dialog excerpts from the film Who Framed Roger Rabbit, performed by Christopher Lloyd.

== Personnel ==
- Mr. Chop – additional instruments (1, 10, 15–16)
- Paloma Faith (aka “Cat-Girl”) – additional vocals (1–2, 9)
- G Koop – keyboards, guitar, bass (3, 6, 12–13)
- Posdnuos (aka P-Pain) – additional vocals (1, 15)
- Prince Paul (aka Filthy Pablo) – additional vocals (15)
- Raekwon – additional vocals (9)

== Charts ==
Chart performance for Born Like This
Chart (2009)	Peak position
US Billboard 200	52
US Billboard Independent Albums	5
US Billboard Top R&B/Hip-Hop Albums	29
US Billboard Rap Albums	9
