= Money Folder =

Single by Madvillain

from the album Madvillainy
- B-side: "America's Most Blunted"
- Released: November 11, 2003
- Genre: Alternative hip-hop
- Length: 4:08
- Label: Stones Throw
- Songwriters: MF Doom; Madlib
- Producer: Madlib

Madvillain singles chronology
"Money Folder" (2003)	"All Caps" (2004)

"Money Folder" is the debut single by the hip-hop duo Madvillain, released ahead of their debut studio album Madvillainy. The single is backed by "America's Most Blunted", featuring Madlib's alter-ego Lord Quas.

== Reception ==
Pitchfork ranked "America's Most Blunted" 278th on its list "The Top 500 Tracks of the 2000s".

== Track listing ==
A-side
No.	Title	Length
1.	"Money Folder" (Vocal)	4:08
2.	"Money Folder" (Remix Vocal)	1:47
3.	"America's Most Blunted" (Vocal)	4:01

B-side
No.	Title	Length
1.	"Money Folder" (Instrumental)	4:08
2.	"Money Folder" (Remix Instrumental)	1:47
3.	"America's Most Blunted" (Instrumental)	2:50

== Charts ==
Chart (2003)	Peak position
US Billboard Hot R&B/Hip-Hop Songs	66

== Personnel ==
Credits are adapted from the single's liner notes.

Personnel

- Madlib – production

Additional personnel

- Wolf – executive production
- Cooley – mastering
- Egon – project coordination

Artwork

- Coleman – photos
- Jank – design
