= Vaudeville Villain =

2003 studio album by Viktor Vaughn

Studio album by Viktor Vaughn
- Released: 16 September 2003
- Recorded: 2001–2003
- Studio: Space 1026, Chinatown, Philadelphia, Pennsylvania
- Genre: Underground hip-hop
- Length: 56:42
- Labels: Sound-Ink Records; Traffic Entertainment Group
- Producers: King Honey; Heat Sensor; Max Bill; RJD2; Mr Ten

MF Doom chronology
| Take Me to Your Leader (2003) | Vaudeville Villain (2003) | Madvillainy (2004) |

Singles from Vaudeville Villain
- 1. "Rae Dawn" Released: 2003; 2. "Saliva" Released: 2003 (promo); 3. "Mr. Clean" Released: June 2004

Vaudeville Villain is the third studio album by British-American rapper-producer MF Doom, released on 16 September 2003 under the pseudonym of Viktor Vaughn. All of the tracks are produced by Sound-Ink record label members Heat Sensor, King Honey, and Max Bill, with the exception of "Saliva", produced by RJD2.

== Background ==
In early 2003, while MF Doom and Madlib were working on Madvillainy, the unfinished demo of the album was stolen and leaked on the internet. Frustrated, the duo decided to work separately on other projects. The first album released by MF Doom in that period was Take Me to Your Leader, followed by Vaudeville Villain. The album was created in the Philadelphia neighborhood of Chinatown, around 2001, and the album was finished in 2003.

== Recording ==
Unlike MF Doom's previous albums, produced entirely by him, the majority of the tracks on Vaudeville Villain were produced by the members of the Sound-Ink record label. He met one of them, Heat Sensor, at a bar in Brooklyn. The two shared common interests, including interest in time travel. Heat Sensor later introduced him to King Honey and Max Bill. The only song not produced by the producer trio was "Saliva", which was produced by RJD2.

== Music and lyrics ==
Vaudeville Villain tells a story of Viktor Vaughn, who was described by NME as a "time travelling street hustler". The character was named after Marvel supervillain Victor Von Doom. While time traveling, Viktor Vaughn's time machine got damaged, which forced him to stay in the early 1990s New York City. The album shows his day-to-day life, with each track showing a different situation he ends up in as he tries to earn money to fix his time machine.

== Release ==
Vaudeville Villain was released on 16 September 2003, by Sound-Ink Records and Traffic Entertainment Group. Two singles from the album were released commercially: "Rae Dawn" and "Mr. Clean". 7-inch promo single "Saliva" was also produced for an online giveaway. Music video for "Mr. Clean" was released to promote the album.

Vaudeville Villain was a moderate commercial success, peaking at number 99 on the Billboard Top R&B/Hip-Hop Albums.

== Critical reception ==
Professional ratings
Review scores
| Source | Rating |
|---|---|
| AllMusic | 4.5/5 stars |
| And It Don't Stop | A |
| Entertainment Weekly | A |
| HipHopDX | 4.0/5 |
| Pitchfork | 9.1/10 |
| Spin | B+ |
| Stylus Magazine | B |
| Tiny Mix Tapes | 5/5 |

Vaudeville Villain received critical acclaim. AllMusic reviewer Mark Pytlik claimed MF Doom was at his absolute best on Vaudeville Villain, calling the album "dense, bright, and packed with ideas". Nathan Rabin, writing for The A.V. Club, commended MF Doom's "ultra-magnetic lyrics" and noted that the album's production isn't as strong as one of Take Me to Your Leader. Neil Drumming of Entertainment Weekly praised the album for its punch lines and "eerie, droning, sci-fi-scented funk" beats. HipHopDX called the album "stellar from start to finish" from the production standpoint, naming track "Saliva" the highlight of the album. Roland Pemberton, writing for Pitchfork, praised the lyrical content of Vaudeville Villain, but criticized its production. Conversely, Scott McKeating of Stylus Magazine thought production of the album was its real strength, and disliked Viktor Vaughn alias and the concept of the album, calling it "fundamentally silly". PopMatters called Vaudeville Villain MF Doom's best work to date, saying rappers like him "helped kick hip-hop in a thousand directions, both sonically and psychologically". Tiny Mix Tapes praised the album, noting that the production "lacks the overall rough and experimental quirkiness and unevenness" of Take Me To Your Leader, which puts vocal delivery in the forefront of the record.

=== Retrospect ===
Writing in 2021 after MF Doom's death, Robert Christgau said the album "could very well be his best" and viewed it as a consistent example of how he was "a fundamentally comic artist for whom rhyme as opposed to meaning was king". In January 2021, NME wrote an article about the album, calling it an "undersung masterpiece" and "perhaps the most compelling reminder of the many talents of Daniel Dumile".

=== Accolades ===
Several publications included Vaudeville Villain in their lists of the best albums. Vaudeville Villain ranked at number 25 on Pitchfork's "Top 50 Albums of 2003" list. Washington City Paper put it at number 4 on its list of the best albums of 2003. Exclaim! listed the album among the best hip-hop albums of 2003. In 2010, Slant Magazine ranked Vaudeville Villain at number 217 in its list of 250 best albums of the 2000s. In 2012, the album ranked at number 25 on Pigeons & Planes's "30 Best Underground Hip-Hop Albums" list.

== Track listing ==
| No. | Title | Writer(s) | Producer(s) | Length |
|---|---|---|---|---|
| 1. | "Overture" | | | 0:34 |
| 2. | "Vaudeville Villain" | Daniel Dumile; Max Lawrence | King Honey | 2:31 |
| 3. | "Lickupon" | Dumile; Nathaniel Gosman; M. Schmitz | Heat Sensor | 2:44 |
| 4. | "The Drop" | Dumile; Matthew McDonald | Max Bill | 3:24 |
| 5. | "Lactose and Lecithin" | Dumile; Gosman | Heat Sensor | 2:34 |
| 6. | "A Dead Mouse" | Dumile; Lawrence | King Honey | 3:55 |
| 7. | "Open Mic Nite, Pt. 1" (featuring Lord Sear, Brother Sambuca, Rodan as Dr. Moreau and Louis Logic) | Dumile; Lawrence | King Honey | 4:09 |
| 8. | "RaeDawn" | Dumile; Gosman; Schmitz | Heat Sensor | 3:00 |
| 9. | "Let Me Watch" (featuring Apani B as Nikki) | Dumile; Lawrence | King Honey | 4:27 |
| 10. | "Saliva" | Dumile; Ramble Jon Krohn | RJD2 | 2:28 |
| 11. | "Modern Day Mugging" | Dumile; Gosman | Heat Sensor | 2:43 |
| 12. | "Open Mic Nite, Pt. 2" (featuring Lord Sear, AJ Ready Wright and Creature) | Dumile; Lawrence | King Honey; Mr Ten | 3:13 |
| 13. | "Never Dead" (featuring M. Sayyid as Curis Strifer) | Dumile; Gosman | Heat Sensor | 3:27 |
| 14. | "PopSnot" | Dumile; McDonald | Max Bill | 4:39 |
| 15. | "Mr. Clean" | Dumile; Lawrence | King Honey | 2:13 |
| 16. | "G.M.C." | Dumile; McDonald | Max Bill | 3:33 |
| 17. | "Untitled A.K.A. Change the Beat" (Bonus Track) (performed by MF Doom) | | Max Bill | 6:55 |

=== Notes ===
- Track 9 is sometimes also called "Can I Watch?".

== Personnel ==
Credits are adapted from the album's liner notes.

Personnel

- N. Gosman – engineering, executive production
- Mark Einstmann – mastering
- D. Dumile – executive production
- A. Threadgold – executive production

Artwork

- M. McDonald – art direction
- Ralph Borland – layout, design

Additional personnel

- M. Lawrence – executive gardening

== Charts ==
2003 chart performance for Vaudeville Villain
| Chart (2003) | Peak position |
|---|---|
| US Top R&B/Hip-Hop Albums (Billboard) | 99 |

2022 chart performance for Vaudeville Villain
| Chart (2022) | Peak position |
|---|---|
| US Billboard 200 | 133 |
| US Independent Albums (Billboard) | 14 |
