= All Caps (Madvillain song) =

Single by Madvillain

Single by Madvillain

from the album Madvillainy
- A-side: "All Caps"
- B-side: "Curls"
- Released: February 4, 2004
- Recorded: 2002
- Genre: Alternative hip-hop
- Length: 2:13
- Label: Stones Throw
- Songwriters: MF Doom; Madlib
- Producer: Madlib

Madvillain singles chronology
"Money Folder" (2003)	"All Caps" (2004)	"One Beer" (2004)

Radio promo version

Music video
- "All Caps" on YouTube

"All Caps" is a single by the hip-hop duo Madvillain, released in February 4, 2004 ahead of their debut studio album, Madvillainy. Though "All Caps" is the A-side, the official title of the single is "Curls & All Caps".

== Background ==
An early version of "All Caps" appeared on the Madvillainy Demo Tape which originally leaked to the internet in early 2003. Around 200 copies of a promotional 12" single were pressed and released to radio stations and DJs including the bonus track "Bonus Beat (Radio Promo Version)". Approximately 40 to 50 of these were hand-painted by Madvillainy cover designer Jeff Jank.

== Music video ==
The video for "All Caps", directed and animated by James Reitano for TFU Studios, is in the form of an animated Silver Age comic book. It begins with two scientists in a lab experimenting with chemicals. Their work goes awry when a mixture fills the lab with gas, and the scientists, locked in by a supposed security guard, begin to mutate. One grows into a huge man-monster called "Madvillain" and dons an MF Doom mask while the other shrinks into a purple alien-like creature with telepathic powers. He is encased in a golden casket-like case, and they both manage to escape the lab. The "title page" then appears, along with a seal bearing Stan Lee's and Jack Kirby's names, and Madvillain, now wearing a suit with a green trenchcoat and brown hat, carries the golden case until he is confronted by a gang of men in suits called "The Minions of Death." They seem to be after the golden case, but the man-monster doesn't surrender it without a fight. Using a laser rifle, the Minions manage to capture the golden case and subdue Madvillain. Back at their hideout, the Minions demand Madvillain to open the case by force. The alien scientist awakens, and the man-monster hears his thoughts, giving him a boost of energy to let them both escape the hideout. The video ends with a high-speed chase in the mountains with the Minions pursuing the mutated scientists. After they fire a few shots, the alien tells the man-monster to speed up. In a cliffhanger ending, the last "page" reads, "Will Madvillain Survive the Minions of Death? Check Back Next Time, Pilgrims!"

The creature featured in the video was reproduced by Kidrobot as a vinyl figure in a green trenchcoat along with a limited edition featuring a grey trenchcoat.

== Track listing ==
A-side
No.	Title	Length
1.	"The Illest Villains" (Remix)	1:51
2.	"All Caps" (Vocal)	2:13
3.	"All Caps" (Instrumental)	2:12

B-side
No.	Title	Length
1.	"Scene Three"	1:29
2.	"Curls" (Vocal)	1:37
3.	"Curls" (Instrumental)	1:35

=== Radio promo version ===
A-side
No.	Title	Length
1.	"The Illest Villains #2"	1:51
2.	"All Caps" (Vocal)	2:12
3.	"All Caps" (Instrumental)	2:12

B-side
No.	Title	Length
1.	"Scene Three" (Instrumental)	1:29
2.	"Curls" (Vocal)	1:37
3.	"Curls" (Instrumental)	1:35
4.	"Bonus Beat" (Radio Promo Exclusive)	1:35 (Note: Incorrectly listed as 1:15 on the vinyl label.)

== Personnel ==
Credits are adapted from the single's liner notes.

Personnel

- MF Doom – MC
- Madlib – beats

Additional personnel

- Peanut Butter Wolf – executive production
- Dave Cooley – recording, mastering

Artwork

- Eric Coleman – photo
- Jank – cover

== Certifications ==
Region	Certification	Certified units/sales
United Kingdom (BPI)	Silver	200,000^{‡}
^{‡} Sales+streaming figures based on certification alone.

== In popular culture ==
- "All Caps" is featured in The Boondocks episode "Let's Nab Oprah" during a fight scene between Huey and Bushido Brown.
