= Take Me to Your Leader (King Geedorah album) =

Studio album by King Geedorah
- Released: 17 June 2003
- Genre: Underground hip-hop
- Length: 41:54
- Label: Big Dada
- Producer: Metal Fingered Villain

MF Doom chronology
MF EP (2000)	Take Me to Your Leader (2003)	Vaudeville Villain (2003)

Singles from Take Me to Your Leader
- 1. "Anti-Matter" Released: 2003

Take Me to Your Leader is the second studio album by British-American MC/producer MF Doom, released under the alias King Geedorah via Big Dada on 17 June 2003. King Geedorah is the alias MF Doom used as part of the underground super group Monsta Island Czars. The album features guest appearances from MF Grimm (as Jet-Jaguar) as well as other MIC members. The character is based on the three-headed King Ghidorah, a monster who appears as Godzilla's enemy in the Godzilla films.

== Background ==
During the production of Madvillainy, the collaboration album between Doom and producer Madlib (Madvillain), the original demo tape got leaked online. Due to their frustration and possible financial ruins from Stones Throw Records, the record label Madvillain was signed to, they stopped production on the album entirely for a year. During this hiatus however, Doom had started working on other projects. The first album released during this span of time was Take Me to Your Leader, followed by Doom's debut release under the alias Viktor Vaughn, Vaudeville Villain.

== Content ==
Take Me To Your Leader is a concept album told from the perspective of King Geedorah, a character based on King Ghidorah, a giant three-headed space monster from the Godzilla films.

Unlike Doom's other standard works, most of the album sees Doom not on vocals, and instead, guest appearances from other rappers (mostly from the Monsta Island Czars collective) and sound collage instrumentals are included throughout the project.

== Reception ==
Professional ratings
Review scores
Source	Rating
AllMusic	2.5/5 stars
Muzik	5/5
Pitchfork	9.0/10
RapReviews	8.5/10
Stylus Magazine	A
Tiny Mix Tapes	5/5
Uncut	4/5 stars

Take Me To Your Leader received acclaim upon release. Mark Martelli of Pitchfork wrote that Take Me to Your Leader "will excite you in a way most hip-hop projects just aren't able: It's not straining for credibility nor putting effort into being revelatory; it just is." Noel Dix of Exclaim! remarked that the album "plays like a cinematic space adventure that you never want to end".

In 2009, Rhapsody ranked Take Me to Your Leader 17th on its list "Hip-Hop's Best Albums of the Decade". In 2012, Stereogum named it the third best MF Doom album. In 2014, it was listed by Complex as one of the "Best One-Producer Albums of the 2000s". Retrospectively, Jacob Adams of Spectrum Culture wrote, "It's perhaps one of the weirdest rap albums of the past decade, yet one of the most endlessly fascinating. It deserves a second listen."

== Track listing ==
All tracks are written by the Metal Fingered Villain.

No.	Title	Length
1.	"Fazers"	3:17
2.	"Fastlane" (featuring Biolante)	3:08
3.	"Krazy World" (featuring Gigan)	4:43
4.	"The Final Hour" (featuring MF Doom)	0:49
5.	"Monster Zero"	5:15
6.	"Next Levels" (featuring Lil' Sci, ID 4 Winds, Empress Stahhr and Stacy Epps)	3:47
7.	"No Snakes Alive" (featuring Jet-Jaguar and Rodan)	3:32
8.	"Anti-Matter" (featuring MF Doom and Mr. Fantastik)	3:26
9.	"Take Me to Your Leader"	2:08
10.	"Lockjaw" (featuring Trunks)	1:03
11.	"I Wonder" (featuring Hassan Chop)	3:38
12.	"One Smart Nigger"	2:39
13.	"The Fine Print"	4:29

== Personnel ==
Credits are adapted from the album's liner notes.

- Metal Fingered Villain – production
- King Geedorah – mixing, mastering
- E.Mason – co-production (1)

== Charts ==
Chart performance for Take Me to Your Leader
Chart (2021)	Peak position
Scottish Albums (Official Charts)	80
