= Madvillain =

American hip-hop duo

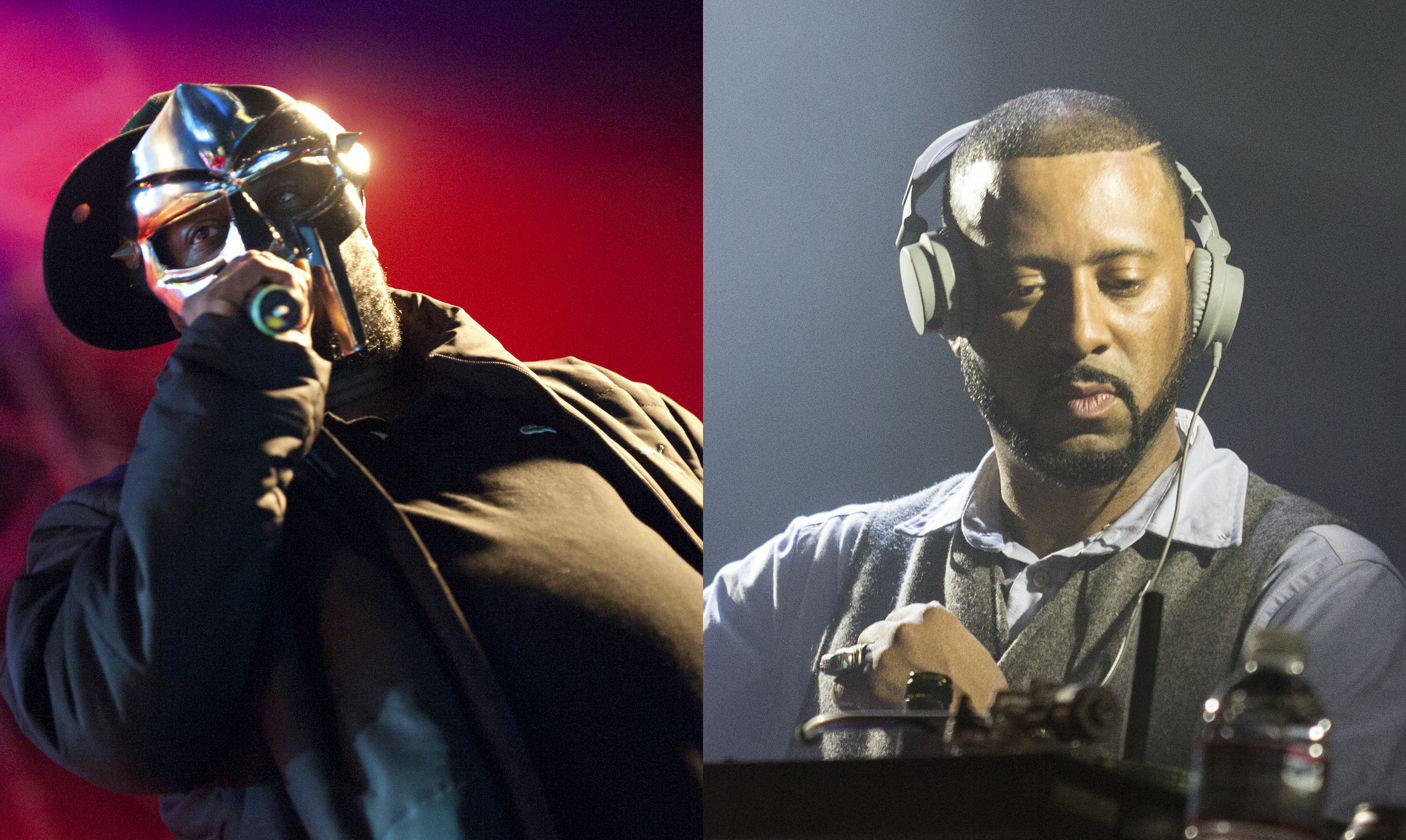
- MF Doom (left) and Madlib (right)

Background information
- Origin: United States
- Genres: Alternative hip-hop; jazz rap; abstract hip-hop; psychedelic rap
- Years active: 2002–2020
- Label: Stones Throw
- Past members: MF Doom; Madlib
- Website: stonesthrow.com/madvillain

Madvillain was an American hip-hop supergroup formed in 2002, consisting of rapper MF Doom and producer Madlib. Their only album, Madvillainy (2004), earned critical acclaim and cult popularity, widely regarded as one of the greatest rap albums of all time and a benchmark record for alternative hip-hop. Their intricate rhymes and lyrics, short song structures and use of obscure, stylistically diverse samples made for a sound that was generally unfriendly to commercial radio but was lauded for its influence on underground rap. A follow-up album to Madvillainy was rumored to be in production at various times since the late 2000s, but no further original material has surfaced from the duo since 2010, and MF Doom's death in 2020 has left the future of the project uncertain.

== History ==
In 2006, Madvillain was featured on Stones Throw Records and Adult Swim's DVD/CD Chrome Children with a new song and live performance. Kidrobot followed this by announcing a Madvillain action figure.

Madvillain's label Stones Throw announced in 2009 that MF Doom and Madlib were currently working on a second Madvillain album.

On May 26, 2010, Madvillain released the song "Papermill" via Adult Swim's website. On January 3, 2011, Madvillain released the songs "Avalanche" and a remix of the Doomstarks song "Victory Laps" via Stones Throw mixtape.

In late 2011, during an interview at the Red Bull Music Academy in Madrid, MF Doom admitted that the second Madvillain album had been nearly done for about two years and that it should be out "soon", sometime after MF Doom finishes his part on it in "say, January" 2012.

On September 6, 2012, MF Doom co-hosted Benji B's late night BBC Radio 1 show. As well as talking about the origins of Madvillain and what it was like to work with Madlib, he announced during the show that he just had to "touch up a couple of tracks" on the new Madvillain album and said that it should be out by the end of 2012, depending on when Stones Throw choose to release it.

On January 9, 2014, Madlib stated in a Dazed & Confused interview that it is up to MF Doom to decide on whether he wants to finish the second Madvillain album, and that he does not have to. "It’s not close to finished because it has to be a continuation of the last one. It doesn't have to be better or worse but it has to be a continuation."

MF Doom died on October 31, 2020, leaving the future of the project uncertain. In 2025, Stones Throw Records digitally re-released the original leaked version of Madvillainy as the Madvillainy Demo Tape.

== Discography ==
=== Album ===
- Madvillainy
  - Released: March 24, 2004
  - Label: Stones Throw
  - Sales: 500,000, BPI: Gold
- Madvillainy 2
  - Released: TBA
  - Label: Stones Throw

=== EPs ===
- 2005: Madvillain Remixes by Four Tet
- 2005: Madvillain Remixes by Koushik

=== Remix album ===
- Madvillainy 2: The Madlib Remix
  - Released: September 15, 2008
  - Label: Stones Throw

=== Instrumental album ===
- Madvillainy Instrumentals
  - Released: December 1, 2004
  - Label: Stones Throw

=== Demo album ===
- Madvillainy Demo Tape
  - Released: September 15, 2008 (as part of Madvillainy 2: The Box). January 31, 2025 (digital release)
  - Label: Stones Throw

=== Singles ===
- 2003: "Money Folder"
- 2004: "All Caps"
- 2004: "One Beer"
- 2008: "One Beer (Drunk Version)" (as part of Madvillainy 2: The Box)
- 2010: "Papermill"
