= Madvillainy =

2004 studio album by Madvillain

Studio album by Madvillain
- Released: March 23, 2004
- Recorded: 2002–2004
- Studios: Bionic (Los Angeles, California); The Bomb Shelter (Glendale, California); Doom's Crib (Atlanta, Georgia)
- Genres: Alternative hip-hop; jazz rap; experimental hip-hop; psychedelic rap; abstract hip-hop; lofi hip-hop
- Length: 46:22
- Label: Stones Throw
- Producers: MF Doom; Madlib

Madvillain chronology
Madvillainy (2004)	Madvillainy 2: The Madlib Remix (2008)

Madlib chronology
Champion Sound (with J Dilla as Jaylib) (2003)	Madvillainy (2004)	Stevie (2004)

MF Doom chronology
Vaudeville Villain (2003)	Madvillainy (2004)	Special Herbs + Spices Volume 1 (2004)

Instrumental release
- Madvillainy Instrumentals

Singles from Madvillainy
- 1. "Money Folder" Released: November 11, 2003; 2. "All Caps" Released: February 2004

Madvillainy is the only studio album by American hip-hop duo Madvillain, consisting of British-American rapper MF Doom and American record producer Madlib. It was released on March 23, 2004, by Stones Throw Records.

The album was recorded between 2002 and 2004. Madlib created most of the instrumentals during a trip to Brazil in his hotel room using minimal amounts of equipment: a Boss SP-303 sampler, a turntable, and a tape deck. Fourteen months before the album was released, an unfinished demo version was stolen and leaked onto the internet. Frustrated, the duo stopped working on the album and returned to it only after they had released other solo projects.

While Madvillainy achieved only moderate commercial success, it became one of the best-selling Stones Throw albums. It peaked at number 179 on the US Billboard 200, and attracted attention from media outlets not usually covering hip-hop music, including The New Yorker. Madvillainy received widespread critical acclaim for Madlib's production and MF Doom's lyricism, and is regarded as Doom's magnum opus. It has since been widely regarded as one of the greatest hip-hop albums of all time, as well as one of the greatest albums of all time in general, being ranked in various publications' lists of all-time greatest albums, including at 411 on NME's The 500 Greatest Albums of All Time, at 365 on Rolling Stone's 500 Greatest Albums of All Time, at 18 on Rolling Stone's 200 Greatest Hip-Hop Albums of All Time, and at 78 on Billboard’s The 100 Greatest Rap Albums of All Time.

== Background ==
In 1997, after the death of his brother DJ Subroc and the rejection of KMD's album Black Bastards by Elektra Records four years previously, rapper Daniel Dumile (formerly known as Zev Love X) returned to music as the masked rapper MF Doom. In 1999, Doom released his debut solo album Operation: Doomsday on Fondle 'Em Records. According to Nathan Rabin of The A.V. Club, the album "has attained mythic status; its legend has grown in proportion to its relative unavailability". Soon after release of the album, in an interview with the Los Angeles Times, Madlib stated that he wanted to collaborate with two artists: J Dilla and Doom.

In 2001, after Fondle 'Em closed, Doom disappeared. During that time, he lived between Long Island, New York, and Kennesaw, a suburb of Atlanta, Georgia. Coincidentally, Eothen "Egon" Alapatt, who was the manager of Madlib's label Stones Throw Records, had a friend in Kennesaw. He asked the friend to give Doom (who did not know about Madlib and Stones Throw at the time) some instrumentals from Madlib. Three weeks later, the friend called back, telling him that Doom loved the instrumentals and wanted to work with Madlib. Soon, one of Doom's "quasi-managers" made an offer, asking for plane tickets to Los Angeles and $1,500. Despite the fact that the label didn't have enough money after buying the tickets, they immediately agreed. According to Egon, soon after arrival, the manager went to him demanding money, while Doom visited Madlib:

The first thing his manager did was get me in my bedroom, which was also the office, and corner me about the 1,500 bucks. I realized that if she was in here, then Doom was with [Madlib], and the longer I kept up this charade with her, the longer they'll vibe and maybe it all might work out.

Egon's plan was successful, and Doom and Madlib began working together. Soon after, Stones Throw Records managed to collect the money necessary to pay Doom and a contract to the label was signed, which was written on a paper plate.

== Recording ==
Doom and Madlib started working on Madvillainy in 2002. Madlib created one hundred beats in a matter of weeks, some of which were used on Madvillainy, some were used on his collaboration album with J Dilla Champion Sound, while others were used for M.E.D.'s and Dudley Perkins' albums. Even though Stones Throw booked Doom a hotel room, he spent most of the time in Madlib's studio, based in an old bomb shelter in Mount Washington, Los Angeles. When the duo was not working on the album, they were spending free time together, drinking beer, eating Thai food, smoking marijuana, and taking psychedelic mushrooms. "Figaro" and "Meat Grinder" were among the songs recorded during this time.

In November 2002, Madlib went to Brazil to participate in a Red Bull Music Academy lecture, where he debuted the first music from the album by playing an unfinished version of "America's Most Blunted". Madlib also went crate digging during his time in Brazil, searching for obscure vinyl records he could sample later, with fellow producers Cut Chemist, DJ Babu, and J.Rocc. According to Madlib himself, he bought multiple crates full of vinyl records, two of which he later lost. He used some of these records to produce beats for Madvillainy. Most of the album, including beats for "Strange Ways", "Raid", and "Rhinestone Cowboy", was produced in his hotel room in São Paulo, using a portable turntable, a cassette deck, and a Boss SP-303 sampler. While Madlib was working on the album in Brazil, the unfinished demo was stolen and leaked on the internet, 14 months before its official release. Jeff Jank, Stones Throw's art director, remembers the leak in the interview with Pitchfork:

Those were the early days of internet leaks, and we thought it would completely ruin sales. People were approaching Doom and Madlib at shows to tell them how much they liked the album, so they were like, 'Fuck it, I'm done.' Madlib started on other stuff, and Doom, well, you never know what he's doing.

Doom and Madlib decided to work on different projects. Madlib released Champion Sound with J Dilla, while Doom released two solo albums: Take Me to Your Leader, as King Geedorah, and Vaudeville Villain, as Viktor Vaughn. Nevertheless, after the release of these albums, they decided to return to Madvillainy. For the final version of the album, Doom altered his voice, described by Peanut Butter Wolf as going from "really hyper, more enthusiastic" to "a more mellow, relaxed, confident, less abrasive", and changed some lyrics to coincide with this change. Madlib was also asked by the label to change some instrumentals, but told them that he forgot the samples he used in order for them to remain on the album. Additionally, the label also requested the duo make a proper ending for the album, forcing them to rent a studio for the recording of "Rhinestone Cowboy". The beat used, however, was produced in Brazil.

=== Production ===
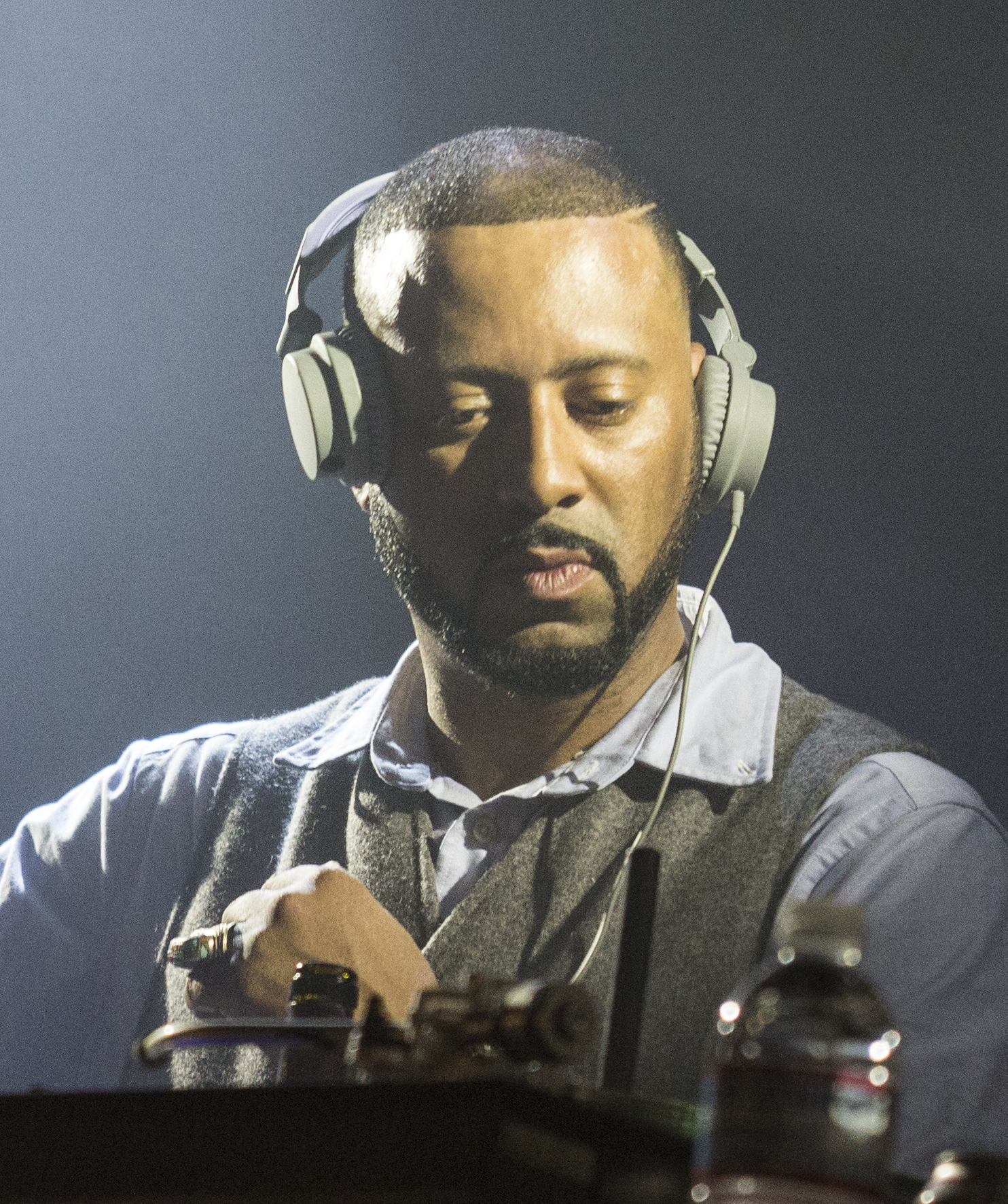
Madlib (pictured in 2014), producer of the album and half of the duo

Madvillainy was produced almost entirely by Madlib, except the first track, which he produced in collaboration with Doom. On the album, Madlib incorporates his distinctive production style, based on using samples, mostly obscure, from albums recorded in different countries. Aside from sampling records by American artists, namely from jazz and soul, Madlib also used Indian (for example, "Shadows of Tomorrow" samples "Hindu Hoon Main Na Musalman Hoon" by R. D. Burman) and Brazilian records ("Curls" samples "Airport Love Theme" by Waldir Calmon) for Madvillainy. In regards to Madlib's production on the album, he stated in an interview:

I did most of the Madvillain album in Brazil. Cuts like "Raid" I did in my hotel room in Brazil on a portable turntable, my 303, and a little tape deck. I recorded it on tape, came back here, put it on CD, and Doom made a song out of it.

The album consists of 22 songs, most of which are under 3 minutes and contain no hooks or choruses. Sam Samuelson of AllMusic compared the album to a comic book, "sometimes segued with vignettes sampled from 1940s movies and broadcasts or left-field [marijuana]-toting skits". He also noted that some instrumentals on the album "[seem] to be so out of time or step with a traditional hip-hop direction". The A.V. Club compared the album to a buffet, where "Madlib and Doom are interested in throwing out ideas as fast as they have them, giving them as much attention as they need, and moving on to the next thing". Tim O'Neil of PopMatters praised Madlib's instrumentals and said that they "make the album a sonic feast".

=== Lyrics ===
"Meat Grinder"
A sample of "Meat Grinder", described by PopMatters as "a tongue twister, with multiple contrasting internal rhymes and almost nonsensical verses jammed together in a way that almost sounds silly but doesn't". HipHopDX praised the instrumental, based on a sample of "Hula Rock" by Lew Howard & The All-Stars, and called it a "particularly sinister piece".

Doom's lyrics on Madvillainy are free-associative. According to Stereogum, the album "is about using sound to craft semi-indecipherable vignettes that are situated somewhere between the real and the mythical". Despite originally featuring a more enthusiastic, excited delivery, the leak prompted Doom to go with a slower and more relaxed flow on the final version of the album. This move has been praised by various publications, including Pitchfork, which said that it was "ultimately better-suited" than the original.

Throughout the album, Doom uses a number of literary devices, including multisyllabic rhymes, internal rhymes, alliteration, assonance, and holorimes. Music critics also noted extensive use of wordplay and double entendres. PopMatters wrote, "You can spend hours poring over the lyric sheet and attempting to grok Doom's infinitely dense verbiage. If language is arbitrary, then many of Doom's verses exploit the essence of words stripped of meaning, random conglomerations of syllables assembled in an order that only makes sense from a rhythmical standpoint", the critic added. The Observer stated that "the densely telegraphic lyrics almost always reward closer inspection" and that Doom's "rhymes miss beats, drop into the middle of the next line, work their way through whole verses" allowing for a smooth listen.

== Artwork ==
The album cover art was created by Stones Throw's art director Jeff Jank, based on a grayscale photo of Doom in his metal mask. In an interview with Ego Trip, Jank said:

Back then, 2003, Doom didn't really have public image. Hip hop heads knew he wore a mask, that he'd been in KMD a decade earlier, but he really was a mystery. So, I really wanted to get a shot of him on the cover, just to make a definitive 'Doom cover'. Specifically, I was thinking of a picture of this man, who happened to wear a mask for some reason, as opposed to 'a picture of a mask'. I don't know if the distinction would occur to anyone else, but to me it was a big deal. I mean, who the hell goes around with a metal mask, what's his story?

The photo was created by photographer Eric Coleman at Stones Throw's house in Los Angeles, and edited by Jank. While working on the Madvillainy album cover, Jank drew inspiration from King Crimson's In the Court of the Crimson King artwork. However, following its completion, he noticed the artwork eerily resembled Madonna's Madonna artwork. Despite this, Jank stuck with the original artwork, labeling it as the "rap version of Beauty and the Beast". A small orange square was added to the final version of Madvillainy, due to Jank's thinking that the artwork "needed something distinctive", comparing it to the orange "O" on the Madonna cover.

== Release and promotion ==
Two singles from Madvillainy were released before the album release: "Money Folder" bundled with "America's Most Blunted", and "All Caps" bundled with "Curls". The first single peaked at number 66 on the Billboard Hot R&B/Hip-Hop Songs chart. Madvillainy was released on March 23, 2004. Despite Stones Throw Records being a relatively small label, the album achieved moderate commercial success, which was big for the label. According to Pitchfork, "after two years of hectoring Stones Throw for making unsalable records, distributor EMI couldn't keep Madvillainy in stock." The album peaked at number 179 on Billboard 200 and sold approximately 150,000 copies, making it one of the label's best-selling albums. Its success allowed Stones Throw to open an office in Highland Park, Los Angeles.

Four official videos were created for the album upon its initial release: "All Caps" (directed by James Reitano), "Rhinestone Cowboy" and "Accordion" (both directed by Andrew Gura), and "Shadows of Tomorrow" (directed by System D-128). "All Caps" and "Rhinestone Cowboy" appear on the DVD Stones Throw 101 along with a hidden easter egg video for "Shadows Of Tomorrow" as a special bonus feature. An impromptu video for "Accordion" was filmed in 2004 but was not released until 2008's In Living the True Gods DVD. In November 2024, Stones Throw re-released "Rhinestone Cowboy" and "Accordion," to their YouTube channel, both remastered by director Andrew Gura from the original files to 4K resolution.

An instrumental version of the album was released in 2004 only in vinyl format and digitally through various online stores, with the tracks "The Illest Villains", "Bistro", "Sickfit", "Do Not Fire!", and "Supervillain Theme" being omitted. It was re-released in 2012 on vinyl with picture sleeve.

In 2014, in honor of the 10th anniversary of Madvillainy, Stones Throw released a special edition of the album on vinyl. The album re-entered Billboard 200 chart, peaking at number 117, higher than it did originally. The same year Madvillainy was also released on Compact Cassettes, as part of the Cassette Store Day.

=== Remixes ===
Several remixes of the album were released. Two remix EPs of Madvillainy were released on Stones Throw in 2005. The remixes were done by Four Tet and Koushik. Madvillainy 2: The Madlib Remix was released on Stones Throw in 2008, containing a complete remix of the album by Madlib as a part of a Madvillain box set. According to Stereogum, it was Madlib's "attempt to get Doom excited enough to work on a true follow-up", recorded after he got tired of waiting for Doom to record the official sequel.

== Critical reception ==
Professional ratings
Aggregate scores
Source	Rating
Metacritic	93/100
Review scores
Source	Rating
AllMusic	5/5 stars
Alternative Press	5/5
Entertainment Weekly	B
Mojo	4/5 stars
The Observer	4/5 stars
Pitchfork	9.4/10
Q	4/5 stars
Rolling Stone	3.5/5 stars
Slant Magazine	4/5 stars
The Village Voice	A−

Madvillainy was met with widespread critical acclaim from music critics and became one of the most critically acclaimed projects of both artists. At Metacritic, which assigns a normalized rating out of 100 to reviews from mainstream critics, the album received an average score of 93, based on 20 reviews; it was the year's best-reviewed rap album and third highest reviewed album overall, according to the website. It also was the second most acclaimed rap album at the time of its release, behind Outkast's Stankonia. Sam Samuelson of AllMusic wrote that album's strength "lies in its mix between seemingly obtuse beats, samples, MCing, and some straight-up hip-hop bumping" and that "MF Doom's unpredictable lyrical style fits quite nicely within Madlib's unconventional beat orchestrations". Will Hermes of Entertainment Weekly called it "indie rap blowing session by two guys near the top of their game". Alternative Press praised Madvillainy as "all invention and no indulgence", while HipHopDX dubbed it an "experimental, eclectic, raw, spontaneous" classic. Mojo praised the album, calling it "a symphony of such densely constructed chaos" and noting that "Madvillainy's very opacity is part of its brilliance".

Pitchfork called Madvillainy "inexhaustibly brilliant, with layer-upon-layer of carefully considered yet immediate hip-hop, forward-thinking but always close to its roots", noting that "the samples are smart and never played-out, and the production and rhymes reveal a determined sense of cooperation, as MF Doom spouts off his most brilliant lyrical change-ups and production-conscious playoffs". Q called Madlib "the most innovative beatsman since Prince Paul", who created "an oddball, cartoon-heavy backdrop for MF Doom's mellifluous wordplay". Rolling Stone described Madlib's tracks as, "fuzzy and crackling with dust", and praised MF Doom, whose flow was commended as "a particularly elegant slur, with syllables spreading over a beat, not crisply adhering to it". Eric Henderson of Slant Magazine called it "a chameleonic masterpiece that alone validates the artistry of sampler culture". Robert Christgau, writing for The Village Voice, praised the album as "a glorious phantasmagoria of flow". Blender's Jody Rosen called it a "torrid album that marries old-school rap aesthetics to punk-rock concision."

Madvillainy also attracted positive reviews from several publications with infrequent coverage of hip-hop music. David Segal of The Washington Post called the album "hysterical, [...] perplexing, arresting, thought-provoking or just plain silly". Kelefa Sanneh of The New York Times called it "a delirious collaboration" and hailed MF Doom as a rapper who "understands the deformative power of rhyme" and "delivers long, free-associative verses full of sideways leaps and unexpected twists". Sasha Frere-Jones of The New Yorker praised the album, noting that "the point of Madvillainy is largely poetic—celebrating the language of music and the music of language" and that while the album's beats are based on samples of records, it's "hard to say which ones, even in a general way".

=== Accolades ===
Several publications included Madvillainy in their lists of the best albums of the year. Pitchfork ranked it number six on their list of the 50 best albums of 2004, stating that "the collaboration brings out the best in both men, without copying anything in their catalogs". Prefix ranked the album first on its list of the 60 best albums of 2004, stating that "when Doom and Madlib combine, they form like Voltron". PopMatters positioned it at number nine on their list of the 100 best albums of 2004, commending MF Doom's "royal, pop culture-laden flow" and Madlib's "beat-mining expertise". Spin ranked it number 17 on their list of the 40 best albums of 2004, praising Madlib's production, "thick, woozy slabs of beatnik bass", that "keeps things hotter than an underground volcano lair". Washington City Paper ranked Madvillainy number one on their list of the top 20 albums of 2004. Stylus Magazine named it the second best album of 2004. In The Village Voice's annual poll Pazz & Jop, which combined votes from 793 critics, Madvillainy was ranked number 11 on the list of the best albums of 2004. The Wire and AllMusic also included the album in their unordered lists of the best albums of the year.

Numerous publications included Madvillainy in various lists of the best albums. Clash positioned it at number 47 in their list of top 100 albums of Clash's lifetime, calling it "slapdash and dilapidated, wholly unconcerned with making sense", "defined by its flippancy and attitude to professionalism". The magazine also listed it on their list of ten best hip-hop albums ever, calling it "one of this decade's finest hip-hop albums" that "elevated the profile of both [artists] to whole new levels". Complex placed the album in their list of 100 best albums available on Spotify, calling it "dusty, weeded up, 22-song masterpiece that stood alone and brought us all into its own little world" and stating that "Madlib and MF Doom's classic wasn't meant for the radio, but it was too good to be kept to the underground". The magazine also listed it among 25 albums of the decade that deserve classic status, describing it as "a classic record that had a goofy cartoony unpredictability, balanced with moments of oddball sincerity" and 71st on the list "The 100 Best Albums of the Complex Decade". HipHopGoldenAge ranked it first in their list of the Top 150 Hip Hop Albums of the Decade, calling it "a perfect example of what can happen if two left-field geniuses combine powers."The A.V. Club featured the album on the list "The Best Music of the Decade", referring to the album as "an instant masterpiece". Fact ranked it number 14 at their list of 100 best albums of the 2000s and praised it as "a perfect synergy between raw beats and incredible rhymes". The magazine also named it the second best album on their list of 100 best indie hip-hop records ever made, stating that it was "arguably the signature moment from the signature rapper and signature producer of the entire movement". Heavy.com ranked the album number 9 on their list "The Top 10 Hip-Hop Albums of the Decade", stating that "MF Doom has never sounded better than he did when he teamed up with Madlib for this little ditty of WTF hip hop". Slant Magazine placed the album at number 39 on the list "The 100 Best Albums of the Aughts", calling it the "undisputed pinnacle of aughts underground rap". Stylus Magazine ranked the album number 13 on its list "The Top 50 Albums: 2000-2004". Fact ranked the album 14th on its "The 100 Best Albums of the 2000s" list, praising it as "a perfect synergy between raw beats and incredible rhymes that in the minds and hearts of many, neither party has yet to surpass". The Guardian included the album in their list of 1000 albums to hear before you die, describing it as "a colourful window into Dumile's world", while praising its "busy unpredictability and stoned comic-book mythos". HipHopDX included the album in two lists: top 10 albums of 2000s and the 30 best underground hip-hop albums since 2000, describing it as "the super rap album, reaching unforeseen creative heights" that "elevated [Doom and Madlib] into Gods for many core Hip Hop heads". Rolling Stone featured it on their list of 40 one album wonders, and in 2020, ranked the album at number 365 in their revised list of the 500 Greatest Albums of All Time.

NME ranked the album number 411 on their list of the 500 greatest albums of all time, describing it as "stoner humour and mind-bending beats from a hip-hop dream team" and stating that "MF Doom and Madlib might not have invented underground rap, but they damn well perfected it". Pitchfork ranked the album at number 13 in their list of the top 100 albums of 2000–2004, commenting, "While Madlib's special power played tricks on your ears – a sample you were sure was the sound of cars rolling by on the street might sound like the hiss of a record on a different day ("Rainbows") – MF Doom unfurled his clever lyrics like a roll of sod on earth... and the album curved in on itself like a two-way mirror."Pitchfork also ranked Madvillainy as the 25th best album of the 2000s, describing it as "a preternaturally perfect pairing of like-minded talents" who "have each been responsible for tons of great, grimy underground hip-hop". Tiny Mix Tapes considered the album the fourth best of the 2000s. Rhapsody ranked the album 1st on its "Hip-Hop's Best Albums of the Decade" list. PopMatters positioned it at number 49 on their list of the 100 best albums of the 2000s and praised MF Doom, who "free-associates culture high and low, from Hemingway to Robh Ruppel, across tongue-tied internal rhymes", and Madlib's "fusion breaks, psych soul, and Steve Reich", and called the album "the best chemistry of either's career, and one of the best of hip-hop, period". In 2016 Q listed Madvillainy among the albums that didn't appear in their list of the best albums of last 30 years, stating that "underground hip-hop's cracked geniuses, Madlib and MF Doom, unite on a labyrinth of weed-stained vignettes that combine invention and accessibility". Spin ranked it number 123 on their list of the 300 best albums of the past 30 years (1985–2014), calling it "a genius cross-pollination of seemingly divergent styles". The magazine also positioned the album at number eight on the list of the 50 best hip-hop debut albums since Reasonable Doubt. Stylus Magazine ranked the album number 13 on their list of the top 50 albums of 2000–2005, praising Madlib's production, based on "an endless supply of funk, soul, and jazz samples", and stating that the album was "displaying the future of hip-hop".

== Legacy and influence ==
According to Vice, Madvillainy is regarded as the "shared touchstone" of lofi hip-hop. Madvillainy has also influenced a generation of artists, included among whom are rappers Joey Badass, the late Capital Steez, Bishop Nehru, Tyler, The Creator, Earl Sweatshirt, Danny Brown, Kirk Knight, producer and rapper Flying Lotus, producer and DJ Cashmere Cat, neo soul collective Jungle, indie rock band Cults, and Radiohead singer Thom Yorke. The singer Bilal names it among his 25 favorite albums. According to Earl Sweatshirt, Madvillainy influenced his generation the same way Wu-Tang Clan influenced the rappers of the 1990s with their album Enter the Wu-Tang (36 Chambers). In a 2009 video of Mos Def working on The Ecstatic in his studio, he praised MF Doom, saying "[Doom] rhymes as weird as I feel". Mos Def also shared some of his favorite Doom bars, many from Madvillainy. He added:

Dude, I swear to God, when I saw that Madvillain record, I bought it on vinyl. I ain't have a record player. I bought it on vinyl just to stare at the album. I stared at it and I just kept going, 'I understand you'.

In 2015, in honor of the release of All-New, All-Different Marvel comics line and to pay homage to classic and contemporary hip-hop albums, Marvel released variant covers inspired by influential albums. One of them was a variant cover of The Mighty Thor comics, based on the Madvillainy cover. It used a grayscale image of Jane Foster's face behind the metal mask, with a picture of Mjolnir in a small orange square on the top right corner and "THE MIGHTY THOR" text in a pixelated font on the top left. In 2024, Marvel comics released Doom #1, which opens with the line "living off borrowed time, the clock ticks faster," in direct reference to the track "Accordion".

According to Complex, Madvillainy's Spotify streams have increased yearly by an average of 73% since 2009 (Spotify's first full year in operation), having started with 183,000 streams, and reaching 226,000,000 streams in 2023.

== Track listing ==
All tracks written by Daniel Dumile and Otis Jackson Jr., except where noted; all tracks produced by Madlib, except "The Illest Villains", produced by Madlib and MF Doom, and voice skits produced by Doom.

No.	Title	Writer(s)	Length
1.	"The Illest Villains"		1:55
2.	"Accordion"	Dumile; Jackson; Alfred Darlington	1:58
3.	"Meat Grinder"		2:11
4.	"Bistro"		1:07
5.	"Raid" (featuring M.E.D. aka Medaphoar)	Dumile; Jackson; Nick Rodriguez	2:30
6.	"America's Most Blunted" (featuring Quasimoto)		3:54
7.	"Sickfit" (Instrumental)	Jackson	1:21
8.	"Rainbows"		2:51
9.	"Curls"		1:35
10.	"Do Not Fire!" (Instrumental)	Jackson	0:52
11.	"Money Folder"		3:02
12.	"Shadows of Tomorrow" (featuring Quas)		2:36
13.	"Operation Lifesaver AKA Mint Test"		1:30
14.	"Figaro"		2:25
15.	"Hardcore Hustle" (featuring Wildchild)	Jackson; Jack Brown	1:21
16.	"Strange Ways"		1:51
17.	"Fancy Clown" (featuring Viktor Vaughn)		1:55
18.	"Eye" (featuring Stacy Epps)		1:57
19.	"Supervillain Theme" (Instrumental)	Jackson	0:52
20.	"All Caps"		2:10
21.	"Great Day"	Dumile; Jackson; Lord Scotch 79	2:16
22.	"Rhinestone Cowboy"		3:59
Total length:			46:22

== Personnel ==
Credits are adapted from the album's liner notes.

=== Madvillain ===
- MF Doom – MC, production (track 1, voice skits), recording
- Madlib – beats, production, recording

=== Additional personnel ===
- Peanut Butter Wolf – executive producer
- Allah's Reflection – additional vocals (track 17)
- Dave Cooley – mixing, mastering, recording
- James Reitano – illustration
- Egon – project coordination
- Miranda Jane – project consultant
- Eric Coleman – photography
- Jeff Jank – design

== Madvillainy Demo Tape / Madvillainy Demos ==
Madvillainy Demo Tape

Demo album by Madvillain
- Released: September 15, 2008 (with Madvillainy 2: The Box); September 7, 2013; November 29, 2024 (as Madvillainy Demos)
- Recorded: 2002
- Studio: The Bomb Shelter (Glendale, California)
- Genres: Alternative hip-hop; jazz rap; experimental hip-hop; underground hip-hop
- Length: 32:37 (Madvillainy Demo Tape); 35:32 (Madvillainy Demos)
- Label: Stones Throw
- Producers: MF Doom; Madlib

Madvillain chronology
Madvillainy 2: The Madlib Remix (2008)	Madvillainy Demo Tape (2008)	Madvillainy 2 (TBA)

Alternative cover
- Madvillainy Demos cover

On July 23, 2008, Stones Throw announced the release of Madvillainy 2: The Box, a box set containing, among other things, a cassette of the leaked Madvillainy demo tape. The box was later released on September 15 of that year, marking the first official release of the Madvillainy demo. The demo was given a standalone release on September 7, 2013, in celebration of the first annual Cassette Store Day.

On October 28, 2024, Stones Throw announced a vinyl release of the demo tape, now titled Madvillainy Demos, with a new album cover featuring a photo of Doom from the Madvillainy cover shoot. The vinyl was put up for preorder the same day and shipped on November 29, 2024, later being widely released on January 31, 2025. The demo features a slightly altered sequence from the cassette tape, now featuring the unreleased demos for "Do Not Fire!" and "Bistro" as the first two songs.

Side 1
No.	Title	Length
1.	"One False Move" ("Great Day" demo)	2:40
2.	"America's Most Blunted"	3:28
3.	"Operation Lifesaver" ("Operation Lifesaver AKA Mint Test" instrumental demo)	1:24
4.	"Figaro"	2:42
5.	"Rainbows"	2:59
6.	"Just for Kicks" ("Meat Grinder" demo)	2:17

Side 2
No.	Title	Length
1.	"Fancy Clown"	3:57
2.	"Shadows of Tomorrow"	3:00
3.	"Money Folder"	4:16
4.	"Stakes" ("Supervillain Theme" demo)	1:29
5.	"All Caps"	2:12
6.	"One False Move" (Instrumental) ("Great Day" instrumental demo)	2:13
Total length:		32:37

Madvillainy Demos track listing
No.	Title	Length
1.	"Do Not Fire!"	0:53
2.	"Bistro"	1:09
3.	"One False Move" ("Great Day" demo)	2:12
4.	"America's Most Blunted"	3:54
5.	"Operation Lifesaver AKA Mint Test" (instrumental demo)	1:26
6.	"Figaro"	2:33
7.	"Rainbows"	3:03
8.	"Just for Kicks" ("Meat Grinder" demo)	2:46
9.	"Fancy Clown"	3:30
10.	"Shadows of Tomorrow"	4:03
11.	"Money Folder"	3:16
12.	"Stakes" ("Supervillain Theme" demo)	1:16
13.	"All Caps"	2:20
14.	"One False Move" (Instrumental)	3:11
Total length:		35:32

== Charts ==
=== Album ===
Original release

Chart (2004)	Peak position
US Billboard 200	179
US Billboard Top R&B/Hip-Hop Albums	80
US Billboard Top Independent Albums	10
US Billboard Top Heatseekers Albums	9

2014 re-release

Chart (2014)	Peak position
US Billboard 200	117
US Billboard Top Catalog Albums	17

Later entries

Chart (2019–2025)	Peak position
Belgian Albums (Ultratop Flanders)	67
Canadian Albums (Billboard)	64
French Albums (SNEP)	116
German Albums (Offizielle Top 100)	75
UK Albums (Official Charts)	58
UK R&B Albums (Official Charts)	3
US Billboard 200	73

=== Singles ===
Song	Chart (2003)	Peak position
"Money Folder"	US Billboard Hot R&B/Hip-Hop Songs	66

== Certifications ==
Region	Certification	Certified units/sales
United Kingdom (BPI)	Gold	100,000^{‡}
United States (RIAA)	Gold	500,000^{‡}
^{‡} Sales+streaming figures based on certification alone.
