= MF Doom production discography =

The following list is a records produced by the British-American hip hop producer and rapper MF Doom. It includes a list of songs produced, co-produced and remixed by year, album and title.

== 1999 ==
=== MF Doom – Operation: Doomsday ===
- 01. "The Time We Faced Doom (skit)"
- 02. "Doomsday"
- 03. "Rhymes Like Dimes" (featuring Cucumber Slice)
- 04. "The Finest" (featuring Tommy Gunn)
- 05. "Back In The Days (skit)"
- 06. "Go With the Flow"
- 07. "Tick, Tick..." (featuring MF Grimm)
- 08. "Red And Gold" (featuring King Geedorah)
- 10. "Who You Think I Am?" (featuring X-Ray, Rodan, Megalon, K.D., King Geedorah and Kong)
- 11. "Doom, Are You Awake? (skit)"
- 12. "Hey!"
- 13. "Operation: Greenbacks" (featuring King Geedorah and Megalon)
- 14. "The Mic"
- 15. "The Mystery of Doom (skit)"
- 16. "Dead Bent"
- 17. "Gas Drawls"
- 18. "?" (featuring Kurious)
- 19. "Hero vs. Villain (Epilogue)" (featuring E. Mason)

== 2000 ==
=== MF Doom and MF Grimm – MF EP ===
- 02. "No Snakes Alive" (performed by MF Doom featuring King Geedorah, Jet Jaguar, and Rodan)
- 03. "Impostas" (performed by MF Doom) (co-produced by III Clown)

== 2002 ==
=== MF Grimm – The Downfall of Ibliys: A Ghetto Opera ===
- 01. "Alpha" (featuring Count Bass D; co-produced by Count Bass D)
- 03. "Life and Death"
- 04. "Freedom" (co-produced by Dr. Butcher)
- 05. "Foolish" (featuring Megalon & MF Doom)
- 08. "Rain Blood" (featuring Megalon)
- 09. "Voices Pt. 0"
- 10. "Voices Pt. 1" (featuring MF Doom)
- 12. "I.B.'s"
- 13. "To All My Comrades"
- 14. "Howl" (co-produced by Dr. Butcher)

=== MC Paul Barman - Paullelujah! ===
- 09. "Anarchist Bookstore Pt. 1"
- 12. "Anarchist Bookstore Pt. 2"

=== Prophetix - High Risk ===
- 13. "Sumpthin's Gotta Give"

== 2003 ==
=== Monsta Island Czars – Escape from Monsta Island! ===
- 05. 1,2... 1,2 (performed by Kong, Megalon and Rodan)
- 06. Scientific Civilization (skit)
- 07. MIC Line (performed by King Geedorah)
- 14. Make It Squash (performed by Kong, Megalon, King Caesar and Rodan)
- 18. "Comin' at You" (performed by Rodan, Megalon & Kamachonga) {co-produced by X-Ray}
- 20. Escape from Monsta Isle (performed by Rodan, Megalon, Kong and Spiega)

=== King Geedorah – Take Me to Your Leader ===
- 1. "Fazers" (produced with E. Mason)
- 2. "Fastlane" (featuring Biolante)
- 3. "Krazy World" (featuring Gigan)
- 4. "The Final Hour" (featuring MF Doom)
- 5. "Monster Zero"
- 6. "Next Levels" featuring Lil' Sci, ID 4 Winds, Stahhr and Stacy Epps)
- 7. "No Snakes Alive" (featuring Jet-Jaguar and Rodan)
- 8. "Anti-Matter" (featuring MF Doom and Mr. Fantastik)
- 9. "Take Me to Your Leader"
- 10. "Lockjaw" (featuring Trunks)
- 11. "I Wonder" (featuring Hassan Chop)
- 12. "One Smart Nigger"
- 13. "The Fine Print"

=== Babbletron - Mechanical Royalty ===
- B3. "Space Tech Banana Clip"

== 2004 ==
=== Madvillain – Madvillainy ===
- 01. "The Illest Villains" (produced with Madlib)

=== MF Doom – Mm..Food ===
- 01. "Beef Rapp"
- 02. "Hoe Cakes"
- 05. "Deep Fried Frenz"
- 06. "Poo-Putt Platter"
- 07. "Fillet-O-Rapper"
- 08. "Gumbo"
- 09. "Fig Leaf Bi-Carbonate"
- 10. "Kon Karne"
- 11. "Guinnesses" (featuring Angelika and 4ize)
- 13. "Rapp Snitch Knishes" (featuring Mr. Fantastik)
- 14. "Vomitspit"
- 15. "Kookies"

=== Vast Aire - Look Mom... No Hands ===
- 09. "Da Supafriendz" (feat. MF Doom)

=== B.I. - "The Instructor" ===
- "The Instructor"

=== Sage Francis - Sickly Business ===
- 13. "Doomage" (featuring Brother Ali & Slug)

== 2005 ==
=== MF Grimm - Scars & Memories ===
- 02. "Take 'Em to War (O.G. Version)"

=== Insight - The Evolution of Rhyme ===
- 13. "The Original" (featuring MF Grimm)

== 2006 ==
=== Ghostface Killah – Fishscale ===
- 06. "9 Milli Bros." (feat. Wu-Tang Clan)
- 15. "Clipse of Doom" (feat. Trife da God)
- 16. "Jellyfish" (featuring Theodore Unit)
- 21. "Underwater"

=== Masta Killa – Made in Brooklyn ===
- 02. "E.N.Y. House"

=== Ghostface Killah – More Fish ===
- 03. "Guns N' Razors" (featuring Trife da God, Cappadonna and Killa Sin)
- 15. "Alex (Stolen Script)"

== 2007 ==
=== Super Chron Flight Brothers - Emergency Powers ===
- 11. "Dirtweed"

=== Rhythm Voyagers Crew - Good Morning America ===
- 14. "Red Vines"

=== Skrein - The Eat Up ===
- 05. "Bastard Like"
- 14. "Pineapples & Pistachios"

=== Hell Razah – Renaissance Child ===
- 04. "Project Jazz" (featuring Talib Kweli and Viktor Vaughn)

== 2008 ==
=== John Robinson – Who is this Man? ===
- 01."Intro / Outside Perspective"
- 02. "Indy 102"
- 03. "There She Goes" (featuring Jah Orah)
- 04. "Shrink Rap"
- 05. "Invisible Man" (featuring 20/20)
- 06. "Rapsploitation"
- 07. "Black Gold"
- 08. "Expressions" (featuring Tiffany Paige)
- 09. "Outta Control"
- 10. "Crazy Music" (featuring Invizible Handz)
- 11. "The Truth" (featuring Invizible Handz and Stahhr)
- 12. "The Replenish"
- 13. "Sorcerers" (featuring Invizible Handz and MF Doom)

=== Earl Sweatshirt - Kitchen Cutlery ===
- 09. "Deerskin"

== 2009 ==
=== MF Doom – Born Like This ===
- 01. "Supervillain Intro"
- 04. "Yessir" (featuring Raekwon)
- 08. "Batty Boyz"
- 09. "Angelz" (featuring Tony Starks)
- 10. "Cellz"
- 11. "Still Dope" (featuring Empress Stahhr Tha Femcee)
- 14. "That's That"
- 15. "Supervillainz" (featuring Kurious Jorge, Slug, and Mobonix)
- 16. "Bumpy's Message" (featuring Freddie Foxxx)
- 17. "Thank Yah"

=== Tyler, the Creator - Bastard ===
- 03. "Odd Toddlers"

=== Chadio - Bangerz & Mash ===
- 10. "Camphor Beat Snatch"

== 2010 ==
=== TiRon – MSTRD ===
- 04. "Ms. Right" (featuring Ayomari)
- 05. "Boys & Girls"

== 2012 ==
=== Capital STEEZ – AmeriKKKan Korruption ===
- 06. "Dead on Arrival"
- 14. "Chicago"

=== Joey Badass – 1999 ===
- 07. "World Domination"
- 08. "Pennyroyal"

=== Ceph - Last Train to Glemont ===
- 07. "Praying for Tomorrow"

=== Bishop Nehru – Nehruvia ===
- 04. "Lemon Grass"
- 13. "Elder Blossoms"

=== Masta Ace – MA Doom: Son of Yvonne ===
- 01. "D Ski's Intro"
- 02. "Nineteen Seventy Something"
- 03. "Son of Yvonne"
- 04. "Da'Pro"
- 05. "Store Frontin'"
- 06. "Me and My Gang"
- 07. "Crush Hour"
- 08. "Think I Am"
- 09. "Fresh Fest"
- 10. "Hoe-Tel Leftovers"
- 11. "Slow Down"
- 12. "Home Sweet Home"
- 13. "Dedication"
- 14. "I Did It"
- 15. "In da Spot"
- 16. "Outtakes"

== 2013 ==
=== Joey Bada$$ – Summer Knights ===
- 13. "Amethyst Rockstar" (featuring Kirk Knight)

=== White MC - Carte Blache ===
- 04. "Hero Sans Cape"

== 2014 ==
=== Bishop Nehru and MF Doom – NehruvianDoom ===
- 01. "Intro"
- 02. "Om"
- 03. "Mean the Most"
- 04. "So Alone"
- 05. "Coming for You"
- 06. "Darkness (HBU)"
- 07. "Caskets"
- 08. "Great Things"
- 09. "Disastrous" (Produced by Madlib, credited as Madvillain)

=== Oshun - Asahye ===
- 04. "Gyenyame"

== 2018 ==
=== Bishop Nehru — Elevators: Act 1 and 2 ===
- 08. Taserz
- 09. Again & Again
- 10. Potassium
- 11. Rollercoasting
- 12. Rooftops

== 2020 ==
=== Bishop Nehru — Nehruvia: My Disregarded Thoughts ===
- "Meathead" (featuring MF Doom. Produced by Madlib, credited as MF Doom)

== 2021 ==
=== The Avalanches - Since I Left You [20th Anniversary Edition] ===
- H1. "Tonight May Have to Last Me All My Life (MF Doom Remix)"

=== Aesop Rock, Homeboy Sandman and Lice - "Ask Anyone" ===
- "Ask Anyone"
