= Special Herbs, Vol. 9 & 0 =

Studio album by Metal Fingers
- Released: 12 July 2005
- Recorded: Various dates
- Genre: Hip-hop, instrumental hip-hop
- Length: 45:51
- Label: Shaman Works
- Producer: Metal Fingers

Metal Fingers chronology
Special Herbs, Vol. 7 & 8 (2004)	Special Herbs, Vol. 9 & 0 (2005)	Special Herbs: The Box Set Vol. 0-9 (2006)

Professional ratings
Review scores
Source	Rating
AllMusic	link

Special Herbs, Vol. 9 & 0 is an instrumental album released by MF Doom under the moniker Metal Fingers. As with all volumes of Special Herbs released by Metal Fingers, each track is named after a herb or similar flora (with the exception of "Untitled (Meditation)").

Although an instrumental album, some tracks contain sampled speech, such as "Food... we need food!" in "Vervain" and "Peach fuzz!" in "Peach Extract". The track "Coca Leaf" is made up of vocal samples of singing women.

== Track listing ==
1. "Vinca Rosea" – 3:00
2. "Burdock Root" – 3:32
3. "Vervain" – 2:59
4. "Bergamot" – 3:33
5. "Podina" – 2:07
6. "Untitled (Meditation)" – 3:56
7. "Coltsfoot Leaf" – 3:41
8. "Orris Root Powder" – 3:37
9. "Passion Flower" – 4:04
10. "Yellow Dock" – 4:22
11. "Datura Stramonium" – 3:02
12. "Coca Leaf" – 3:51
13. "Peach Extract" – 4:07

== Other versions ==
- "Vinca Rosea" is an instrumental version of "It's No Secret" by Hassan Chop from the promo The Sharpening.
- "Burdock Root" is an instrumental version of "Rapsploitation" by John Robinson from the album Who Is This Man?.
- "Vervain" is an instrumental version of "Beef Rapp" from Mm..Food.
- "Bergamot" is an instrumental version of "Darkness (HBU)" from NehruvianDOOM's NehruvianDOOM.
- "Podina" is an instrumental version of "?" from Operation: Doomsday. An alternative cut was also included on Special Herbs, Vol. 2 under the name "Charnsuka".
- "Untitled (Meditation)" is an instrumental version of "The Fine Print" by King Geedorah, from the album Take Me to Your Leader. It is also used on "Return to Monsta Island" by MF Grimm from Special Herbs + Spices Volume One.
- "Coltsfoot Leaf" is an instrumental version of "I Wonder" by King Geedorah, from the album Take Me to Your Leader.
- "Orris Root Powder" is an instrumental version of "Monsters" by MF Doom and Trunks from the EP Unicron. It is also used on "Black Gold" from John Robinson's Who Is This Man? which was also included on MF Doom's Unexpected Guests.
- "Passion Flower" was used on "Still Dope" from Doom's Born Like This.
- "Datura Stramonium" is an instrumental version of "Poo-Putt Platter" from Mm..Food, and is also used on "Da Superfriendz" by Vast Aire featuring MF Doom, on the album Look Mom... No Hands. as well as "World Domination" by Joey Badass, from the mixtape 1999.
- "Coca Leaf" was used on "Supervillain Intro" and "Thank Ya" both from Doom's Born Like This.
- "Peach Extract" is an instrumental version of "Peach Fuzz" from KMD's Mr. Hood.
