= Special Herbs, Vol. 4 =

Studio album by Metal Fingers
- Released: 23 September 2003
- Recorded: Various dates
- Genre: Hip-hop, instrumental hip-hop
- Length: 49:54
- Label: Nature Sounds
- Producer: Metal Fingers

Metal Fingers chronology
Special Herbs, Vol. 3 (2003)	Special Herbs, Vol. 4 (2003)	Special Herbs, 4,5,6 (2004)

Special Herbs, Vol. 4 is an album of instrumental works released by MF Doom under the Metal Fingers moniker, the fourth part of his Special Herbs series. Following the pattern set by previous installments of the series, each track is named for a herb or similar flora.

The album's title is slightly misleading, in that it is not an entirely new volume: the third installment in the Metal Fingers series, Special Herbs, Vol. 3, appears again here as the last eight tracks of Vol. 4. For this reason, the album is also commonly known as Special Herbs, Vol. 3 & 4. The difference in record labels on which the two albums were released explains this quirk, similar to the earlier inclusion of Vol. 1 as the first part of Vol. 2.

== Track listing ==
1. "Blood Root" – 3:00
  - Produced by Metal Fingers
2. "Star Anis" – 3:28
  - Produced by Metal Fingers
3. "Lemon Grass" – 4:21
  - Produced by Metal Fingers
4. "Four Thieves Vinegar" – 3:34
  - Produced by Metal Fingers
5. "Galangal Root" – 2:33
  - Produced by Metal Fingers
6. "Spikenard" – 3:33
  - Produced by Metal Fingers
7. "Cinquefoil" – 2:59
  - Produced by Metal Fingers
8. "Hyssop" – 3:33
  - Produced by Metal Fingers
9. "Agrimony" – 2:06
  - Produced by Metal Fingers
10. "Arabic Gum" – 2:50
  - Produced by Metal Fingers
11. "Benzoin Gum" – 2:47
  - Produced by Metal Fingers
12. "Bergamot Wild" – 3:25
  - Produced by Metal Fingers
13. "Calamus Root" – 3:49
  - Produced by Metal Fingers
14. "Dragon's Blood Resin" – 3:38
  - Produced by Metal Fingers
15. "Elder Blossoms" – 2:46
  - Produced by Metal Fingers
16. "Styrax Gum" – 2:32
  - Produced by Metal Fingers

== Other versions ==
- "Blood Root" is an instrumental version of "I Hear Voices" by MF Doom and MF Grimm from "I Hear Voices Pt. 1 (12" Version)".
- "Star Anis" is an instrumental version of "No Snakes Alive" by MF Grimm, from the collaboration EP with MF Doom, the MF EP. It is also used on an updated version, "No Snakes Alive", by King Geedorah featuring MF Grimm and Rodan, from the album Take Me to Your Leader.
- "Lemon Grass" is an instrumental version of "Krazy World" by King Geedorah, from Take Me to Your Leader. It is also used on "Benzoin Gum + Asafoetida = 10 Years Later" by MF Grimm, from Special Herbs + Spices Volume One.
- "Four Thieves Vinegar" is an instrumental version of "Rain Blood" by MF Grimm featuring Megalon, from the album The Downfall of Ibliys: A Ghetto Opera. It is also used on "Rain Blood Pt. 2" by MF Grimm, from the album Special Herbs + Spices Volume One; and also on "Clipse of Doom" by Ghostface Killah featuring Trife, from the album Fishscale.
- "Galangal Root" is an instrumental version of "Dead Bent" by MF Doom, from Operation: Doomsday. It is also used on "Superhero" by MF Grimm, from Special Herbs + Spices Volume One.
- "Spikenard" is an instrumental version of "Popcorn" by KMD, from Black Bastards Ruffs + Rares.
- "Hyssop" is an instrumental version of "The Final Hour" by King Geedorah featuring MF Doom from the album Take Me to Your Leader. It is also used on the title track from the same album. It is also used on "Tick Tick Pt. 2" by MF Grimm, from Special Herbs + Spices Volume One.
- "Arabic Gum" is an instrumental version of "Space Tech Banana Clip" by Babbletron, from the album Mechanical Royalty.
- "Benzoin Gum" is an instrumental version of "Lemon Grass" by Bishop Nehru, from the album Nehruvia.
- "Bergamot Wild" is an instrumental version of "Escape From Monsta Isle" by Rodan, Megalon, Kong, and Spiega, from the Monsta Island Czars album Escape from Monsta Island!.
- "Calamus Root" is an instrumental version of "Gas Drawls" by MF Doom, from Operation: Doomsday.
- "Dragon's Blood Resin" is an instrumental version of "Go With the Flow" by MF Doom, from Operation: Doomsday.
- "Elder Blossoms" is an instrumental version of "Crazy Music" by John Robinson featuring Invizible Handz from the album Who Is This Man?.
- "Styrax Gum" is an instrumental version of "That's That'" by Doom, from Born Like This.
