= Special Herbs, Vol. 1 =

Studio album by Metal Fingers
- Released: 2001
- Genre: Hip-hop, instrumental hip-hop
- Length: 29:21
- Label: Female Fun Records
- Producer: Metal Fingers, DJ Subroc

Metal Fingers chronology
Special Herbs, Vol. 1 (2001)	Special Herbs, Vol. 2 (2002)

Special Herbs, Vol. 1 is the first album in the Special Herbs series of instrumental works released by MF Doom under the Metal Fingers moniker on various independent hip-hop labels. Establishing the trend for later albums in the series, each track is named after a herb or similar flora (with the possibly ironic exception of mass-produced flavour enhancer monosodium glutamate).

Because the Special Herbs albums were released on various labels, the nine tracks of Vol. 1 appear again as the first nine tracks on the following album, Special Herbs, Vol. 2.

== Track listing ==
All produced by MF Doom under his Metal Fingers alias except when noted.

1. "Saffron" – 3:24
2. "Arrow Root" – 3:45
3. "Zatar" – 3:14
4. "Fenugreek" – 3:22
5. "Sumac Berries" – 3:34
6. "Coriander" – 3:03
7. "Shallots" – 4:00
  - Produced by DJ Subroc
8. "Charnsuka" – 2:19
9. "Monosodium Glutamate" – 2:40

== Other versions ==
- "Saffron" is an instrumental version of "Doomsday" by MF Doom, from the album Operation: Doomsday.
- "Arrow Root" is an instrumental version of "Next Levels" by King Geedorah featuring Scienz of Life, from the album Take Me to Your Leader; it is also used by Spiga and King Caesar on "Ride The Arrow", from the X-Ray Monster Mixes 2 compilation.
- "Zatar" is an instrumental version of "Foolish" by MF Grimm featuring MF Doom and Megalon, from the album The Downfall of Ibliys: A Ghetto Opera.
- "Fenugreek" is an instrumental version of "1,2...1,2" by Monsta Island Czars from the album Escape from Monsta Island!; it is also used by Ghostface Killah featuring the Wu-Tang Clan on "9 Milli Bros.", from the album Fishscale.
- "Sumac Berries" is an instrumental version of "Scientific Civilization" by Monsta Island Czars from Escape from Monsta Island!. It is also used by The John Robinson Project for "Indy 102", and by Ghostface Killah featuring Trife on "Jellyfish", from Fishscale.
- "Coriander" is an instrumental version of "Mic Line" by King Geedorah, from Escape from Monsta Island!.
- "Shallots" is an instrumental version of "The Hands of Doom" by MF Doom, from Operation: Doomsday.
- "Monosodium Glutamate" is an instrumental version of "Rhymes Like Dimes" by MF Doom featuring DJ Cucumber Slice, from the same album.
