= Special Herbs, Vol. 2 =

Studio album by Metal Fingers
- Released: 1 January 2002
- Recorded: Various dates
- Genre: Hip-hop, instrumental hip-hop
- Length: 59:21
- Label: High Times Records
- Producer: Metal Fingers, DJ Subroc

Metal Fingers chronology
Special Herbs, Vol. 1 (2001)	Special Herbs, Vol. 2 (2002)	Special Herbs, Vol. 3 (2002)

Special Herbs, Vol. 2 is the second album in the Special Herbs series of instrumental works released by Daniel Dumile, better known as MF Doom, under the Metal Fingers moniker. As with the previous volume, each track is named after a herb or similar flora.

The album's title is slightly misleading, in that it is not an entirely new volume: the first installment in the Metal Fingers series, Special Herbs, Vol. 1, appears again as the first nine tracks of Vol. 2, and a note on the cover explains that the latter "contains Volumes 1 & 2". For this reason, the album is also commonly known as Special Herbs, Vol. 1 & 2, and this is the title used on streaming services. The difference in record labels on which the two albums were released explains this quirk.

== Track listing ==
1. "Saffron" – 3:24
  - Produced by MF Doom
2. "Arrow Root" – 3:45
  - Produced by MF Doom
3. "Zatar" – 3:14
  - Produced by MF Doom
4. "Fenugreek" – 3:22
  - Produced by MF Doom
5. "Sumac Berries" – 3:34
  - Produced by MF Doom
6. "Coriander" – 3:03
  - Produced by MF Doom
7. "Shallots" – 4:00
  - Produced by DJ Subroc
8. "Charnsuka" – 2:19
  - Produced by MF Doom
9. "Monosodium Glutamate" – 2:40
  - Produced by MF Doom
10. "Red #40" – 3:39
  - Produced by MF Doom
11. "Nettle Leaves" – 3:28
  - Produced by MF Doom
12. "Mullein" – 4:40
  - Produced by MF Doom
13. "Mugwort" – 2:26
  - Produced by MF Doom
14. "All Spice" – 3:00
  - Produced by MF Doom
15. "Lovage" – 3:57
  - Produced by MF Doom
16. "Eucalyptus" – 2:44
  - Produced by MF Doom
17. "Myrrh" – 6:36
  - Produced by MF Doom

== Other versions ==
- "Saffron" is the instrumental version of the song "Doomsday" which can be found on the album Operation: Doomsday.
- "Arrow Root" is an instrumental version of "Next Levels" by King Geedorah featuring Scienz of Life, from the album Take Me to Your Leader; it is also used by Spiga and King Caesar on "Ride The Arrow", from the X-Ray Monster Mixes 2 compilation.
- "Zatar" is an instrumental version of "Foolish" by MF Grimm featuring MF Doom and Megalon, from the album The Downfall of Ibliys: A Ghetto Opera.
- "Fenugreek" is an instrumental version of "1,2...1,2" by Monsta Island Czars from the album Escape from Monsta Island!; it is also used by Ghostface Killah featuring the Wu-Tang Clan on "9 Milli Bros.", from the album Fishscale.
- "Sumac Berries" is an instrumental version of "Scientific Civilization" by Monsta Island Czars from Escape from Monsta Island!. It is also used by The John Robinson Project for "Indy 102", and by Ghostface Killah featuring Trife on "Jellyfish", from Fishscale.
- "Coriander" is an instrumental version of "Mic Line" by King Geedorah, from Escape from Monsta Island!.
- "Shallots" is an instrumental version of "The Hands of Doom" by MF Doom, from Operation: Doomsday.
- "Charnsuka" is an instrumental version of "?" by MF Doom featuring Kurious, from the same album. An alternative cut was also included on Special Herbs, Vols. 9 & 0 under the name "Podina".
- "Monosodium Glutamate" is an instrumental version of "Rhymes Like Dimes" by MF Doom featuring DJ Cucumber Slice, from the same album.
- "Red #40" is an instrumental version of "Make It Squash! (Got a Roc)" by Kong, Megalon, King Caesar and Rodan, from Escape from Monsta Island!. It is also used on "Bottle Rocket" by MF Grimm, from the MF Doom collaboration album Special Herbs and Spices Volume 1.
- "Nettle Leaves" is an instrumental version of "Who You Think I Am?" by MF Doom featuring King Caesar, Rodan, Megalon, Kamackeris and Kong, from Operation: Doomsday.
- "Mullein" is an instrumental version of "Live Wirez" by Gigan, from the X-Ray Monster Mixes 1 compilation. Sampled from Dragon Ball Z.
- "Mugwort" is an instrumental version of "Fastlane" by King Geedorah featuring Kurious, from Take Me to Your Leader. It is also used on "Shifting Lanes" by MF Grimm featuring Kurious, from Special Herbs and Spices Volume 1.
- "All Spice" is an instrumental version of "Kon Karne" by MF Doom, from the album Mm..Food. It was also to be used on "My Love" by MF Grimm from his triple album set American Hunger, but owing to their recent disagreements Grimm substituted a different beat.
- "Lovage" is an instrumental version of "Guinnesses" by MF Doom featuring Angelika and 4ize, from Mm..Food.
- "Eucalyptus" is an instrumental version of "I.B.'s" by MF Grimm, from The Downfall of Ibliys: A Ghetto Opera.
- "Myrrh" is an instrumental version of "Deep Fried Frenz" by MF Doom, from Mm..Food.
- "Metal Flowers", the hidden track after "Myrrh", is an instrumental version of "Beef Rapp" from the same album; later renamed "Vervain", it was also included on Special Herbs, Vols. 9 & 0.
