= Special Herbs, Vol. 3 =

Studio album by Metal Fingers
- Released: 2002
- Recorded: Various dates
- Genres: Hip-hop, instrumental hip-hop
- Length: 23:53
- Label: Female Fun Records
- Producer: Metal Fingers

Metal Fingers chronology
Special Herbs, Vol. 2 (2002)	Special Herbs, Vol. 3 (2002)	Special Herbs, Vol. 4 (2003)

Special Herbs, Vol. 3 is an album of instrumental works released by MF Doom in 2002, the third release in his Special Herbs series. Following the pattern set by previous installments of the series, each track is named after a herb or similar flora.

The album includes selections from his LP Operation: Doomsday, as well as new tracks. Notable tracks include "Dragon's Blood" and "Benzoin Gum".

Owing to differences in record labels and overlaps in track listings, this album also makes up the first part of the next installment in the series, Special Herbs, Vol. 4.

== Track listing ==
1. "Agrimony" – 2:06
  - Produced by Metal Fingers
2. "Arabic Gum" – 2:50
  - Produced by Metal Fingers
3. "Benzoin Gum" – 2:47
  - Produced by Metal Fingers
4. "Bergamot Wild" – 3:25
  - Produced by Metal Fingers
5. "Calamus Root" – 3:49
  - Produced by Metal Fingers
6. "Dragon's Blood Resin" – 3:38
  - Produced by Metal Fingers
7. "Elder Blossoms" – 2:46
  - Produced by Metal Fingers
8. "Styrax Gum" – 2:32
  - Produced by Metal Fingers

== Other versions ==
- "Star Anis" is an instrumental version of "No Snakes Alive Pt. 3" by MF Grimm, from the collaboration EP with MF Doom, the MF EP. It is also used on an updated version, "No Snakes Alive", by King Geedorah featuring MF Grimm and Rodan, from the album Take Me to Your Leader.
- "Bergamot Wild" is an instrumental version of "Rain Blood" by MF Grimm featuring Megalon, from the album The Downfall of Ibliys: A Ghetto Opera. It is also used on "Rain Blood Pt. 2" by MF Grimm, from the album Special Herbs and Spices Volume 1; and also on "Clipse of Doom" by Ghostface Killah featuring Trife, from his 2006 album Fishscale.
- "Blood Root" is an instrumental version of "I Hear Voices" by MF Doom, the bonus track on the album Operation: Doomsday.
- "Calamus Root" is an instrumental version of "Gas Drawls" by MF Doom, from Operation: Doomsday.
- "Dragon's Blood Resin" is an instrumental version of "Go With The Flow" by MF Doom, from Operation: Doomsday.
- "Elder Blossoms" is an instrumental version of "Sumpthin's Gotta Give" by Prophetix, from the album High Risk.
- "Styrax Gum" is an instrumental version of "That's That" by MF Doom, from Born Like This.
