= Special Herbs, Vol. 7 & 8 =

Studio album by Metal Fingers
- Released: 21 September 2004
- Recorded: Various dates
- Genre: Hip-hop, instrumental hip-hop
- Length: 44:40
- Label: Shaman Works
- Producer: Metal Fingers

Metal Fingers chronology
Special Herbs, Vol. 5 & 6 (2004)	Special Herbs, Vol. 7 & 8 (2004)	Special Herbs, Vol. 9 & 0 (2005)

Professional ratings
Review scores
Source	Rating
AllMusic	link

Special Herbs, Vol. 7 & 8 is an instrumental album released by MF Doom under the moniker Metal Fingers. As with all volumes of Special Herbs released by Metal Fingers, each track is named after a herb or similar flora. Although being an instrumental album, some tracks contain sampled speech.

== Track listing ==
1. "Safed Musli" – 3:15
2. "Emblica Officinalis" – 4:50
3. "Licorice" – 3:05
4. "Sarsaparilla" – 3:39
5. "Fo Ti" – 2:49
6. "Camphor" – 1:50
7. "High John" – 4:31
8. "Mandrake" – 2:34
9. "Devil's Shoestring" – 4:25
10. "Wormwood" – 3:19
11. "Cedar" – 3:35
12. "Buckeyes" – 3:04
13. "Chrysanthemum Flowers" – 3:54

== Other versions ==
- "Safed Musli" is an instrumental version of "Slow Down" by Masta Ace, from the album MA Doom: Son of Yvonne, and of "Oh Dear" by Joey Bada$$, from the mixtape Rejex.
- "Emblica Officinalis" is an instrumental version of a section of "Anarchist Bookstore Pt. 2" by MC Paul Barman, from the album Paullelujah!.
- "Licorice" is an instrumental version of "Sorcerers" by KMD, from the Shaman Works label compilation Shaman Work: Family Files.
- "Sarsaparilla" is an instrumental version of "Anti-Matter" by King Geedorah featuring MF Doom and Mr. Fantastik, from the album Take Me to Your Leader.
- "Fo Ti" is an instrumental version of "Coming For You" by NehruvianDOOM, from their self-titled album.
- "Camphor" is an instrumental version of "Intro Outside Perspective" by John Robinson from the album Who Is This Man?.
- "High John" is an instrumental version of "95" by Isaiah Rashad from the album Welcome to the Game.
- "Mandrake" is an instrumental version of "Perfect Day" by Dem Atlas, from the album mF deM.
- "Wormwood" is an instrumental version of "Lockjaw" by King Geedorah featuring Trunks, and of "One Smart Nigger" by King Geedorah, both from the album Take Me to Your Leader.
- "Cedar" is an instrumental version of "The Replenish" by John Robinson from the album Who Is This Man?.
- "Buckeyes" is an instrumental version of "Fazers" by King Geedorah, from the album Take Me to Your Leader.
- "Chrysanthemum Flowers" is an instrumental version of MF Doom's "Outro" to the compilation Spitkicker Presents: The Next Spit Vol. 3, as well as being an instrumental version of "Expressions" featuring Tiffany Paige by John Robinson from the album Who Is This Man?.
