= Deep Fried Frenz =

Song by MF Doom

from the album Mm..Food
- Released: 16 November 2004
- Genre: Hip-hop
- Length: 5:00
- Label: Rhymesayers
- Songwriter: Daniel Dumile
- Producer: MF Doom

"Deep Fried Frenz" is a song by British-American rapper MF Doom from his 2004 album Mm..Food. The song uses Doom’s instrumental track “Myrrh” from his 2002 album Special Herbs, Vol. 2, which samples “Friends” by Whodini and “Friends & Strangers” by Ronnie Laws. Lyrically, the track examines themes of friendship, focusing on betrayal and the complexities of false allies. Similar to most of the songs on Mm..Food, the song concludes with an outro featuring multiple samples from several pieces of media (often old cartoon series), with this particularly containing samples of “Watermelon Man” (1970), “The New Fantastic Four” (1978-1978), and “Spider-Man” (1981-1982).

== Composition and lyrics ==
Musically, “Deep Fried Frenz” features a playful yet slightly off-kilter instrumental. RapReviews describes the track as having “kitschy keys”, and an overall vibe akin to an 1980s sitcom theme song. The beat is driven by layered samples and a looping piano riff, giving it a light, almost whimsical feel on the surface. Pitchfork’s review notes that the song prominently flips a Whodini sample into its foundation having the main groove incorporates Whodini’s song “Friends,” which Doom re-purposes here.

Lyrically, the song focuses on broken friendships and betrayal. Doom raps about people who once claimed to be friends but proved fake or jealous. He warns about “friends… [who] turn on you” and emphasizes the need to cut off disloyal associates. For example, one lyric says that “jealousy [is] the number one killer” among friends and that sometimes you have to “cut niggas off like a light switch”. In other words, the lyrics portray the pain of realizing that close allies have lied or betrayed him. Critics have noted this contrast between sound and subject with Pitchfork observing that beneath the bright, nostalgic samples “there are fissures” of genuine hurt, and the song is “weighed down by real, evident pain” in its words.

== Critical reception ==
“Deep Fried Frenz”, along with tracks such as “One Beer”, “Rapp Snitch Knishes”, “Hoe Cakes”, “Vomitspit”, “Potholderz”, and “Beef Rapp”, is commonly regarded as one of the standout tracks on Mm… Food. It has received positive attention from underground hip-hop critics. In a 2004 Pitchfork album review, critic Nick Sylvester specifically highlighted “Deep Fried Frenz” for its clever use of sampling and lyricism. He wrote that the Whodini sample on the track was used to transform a “feel-good song into a mess of betrayal, bitterness, and matter-of-fact credos”, effectively praising Doom’s twist on the source material.
