= Sub Verse Music =

Sub Verse Music was a record label specializing in hip hop. It existed from 1998 to 2003 and released recordings by MF Doom, Blackalicious and KMD, among others.

== History ==
The label was dedicated to underground, conscious hip-hop and was started by Bigg Jus, one of the founders of the underground NYC group Company Flow of Rawkus Records, Peter Lupoff, an entertainment investor, and Fiona Bloom, hip-hop publicist and then label manager of the hip-hop label 3-2-1 Records.

Sub Verse was launched in 1998 and released artists such as Blackalicious, Rubberroom, Scienz of Life, KMD, MF Doom, Micranots, C-Rayz Walz and Bigg Jus. Their records were distributed worldwide through EMI and received critical acclaim.

Though Sub Verse came very close to getting bought or invested in by MCA, with the industry in decline the label eventually ran out of money and could not put out records that would at least make the cost back. The events of 9/11 also took their toll on the morale and the financial fortunes of the NY company. These factors occurred just as Sub Verse's music started to become more broadly accessible, with releases by MF Doom, the important release of KMD's Black Bastards, and LPs and singles by some up and coming artists such as C-Rayz Walz, Bukue One, Tariq L and DMS. Sub Verse put out its last release, a compilation called "Seditious Jewels", in 2003.

Sub Verse Music supported the underground hip-hop scene in NYC and to a degree, the larger cities in the US with shows in New York, regularly at The Knitting Factory for instance. The label had a separate entity, called "Subversive Skool", run by Fiona Bloom with Peter Lupoff, that brought underground artists from outside NYC to New York. Shows were headlined by the "star", usually had another NYC local notable and one or two Sub Verse artists or prospects. It was sponsored by 555 Soul and Eckō Unltd., among others. The label also gave CDs, vinyl, T-shirts, other Sub Verse gear and their time and effort to support causes like hip-hop education (at the Brooklyn Museum), the Hip-Hop Film Festival, and Tolerance.org.

== People ==
C-Rayz Walz was known as one of the top battle MCs in NY. While label co-founder Bigg Jus had a view of a more dusty underground sound, C-Rayz was friendly with Lupoff and later with Bloom. He was a stalwart of the shows produced by Sub Verse' Subversive Skool unit and was later the battle MC and teacher on an MTV episode of "Made" in which a kid strives to be a battle MC.

MF Doom turned to Sub Verse after Fondle 'Em Records closed up shop. After his meeting up with Bigg Jus in ATL, Sub Verse re-mastered and re-released his Operation: Doomsday with a new track: "I Hear Voices (Part 1)". A Flash video for this track won gold in the International Design Excellence Awards in 2001. Sub Verse also released the shelved Black Bastards, recorded for Elektra with his old group KMD.

Bigg Jus came to hip-hop through graffiti. Through his skills he became acquainted with El-P, an up-and-coming underground MC. The two lived together a while, and joined with Mr. Len to form the seminal NYC underground squad, Company Flow.

Bukue One was a graf, skateboard, and, oddly, duckpin bowling fiend. His graffiti covered whole walls in the Sub Verse office in Tribeca. Bukue set his own course always and only looked to Sub Verse to help him get around the world and back in exchange for recordings. Bukue is affiliated loosely with the Hieroglyphics crew, having grown up in Oakland and tour managed them often.

Fiona Bloom is a British, classically trained pianist who won classical music scholarships to the U.S. and fell in love with hip hop. She worked at radio stations in ATL, then for EMI, and then ran 3-2-1 Records, a fledgling hip-hop label and source of early Sub Verse recordings.

Peter Lupoff is a Wall Street investor, entertainment banker and venture capitalist. But it is little known that early on, he was part of a hip-hop group with live instruments that played around NYC; their group opened for Kool Moe Dee, Slick Rick and others, and in the 90's Peter ghostwrote lyrics for better known artists struck with writer's block. He was known to labels as "the cleaner", for his ability to clean up botched projects, and to others as "Stylin' Pete Style", for his dressy apparel.

Opuriche "OP" Miller is a current DJ on the scenes in NYC and South Africa. OP started out as an employee at Sub Verse, focused on marketing and processing recordings from initial recording to release. Eventually, when many left Sub Verse after 911, his music aesthetic was the direction Sub Verse wanted to go and OP was largely the A&R person in the waning years. OP is actively involved in major hip-hop releases on the distribution side to this day.

Sub Verse had many interns come through their shop in the years 1998–2003, many are now actively involved in music, management, distribution and marketing.

== See also ==
- List of record labels
