= Unexpected Guests =

Compilation album by Doom
- Released: 27 October 2009
- Genre: Hip-hop
- Length: 49:09
- Label: Gold Dust Media; Metal Face Records
- Producer: Fyre Dept.; J Dilla; ID 4 Windz; Doom; Count Bass D; The Prof; Babu

Doom chronology
Born Like This (2009)	Unexpected Guests (2009)	Expektoration (2010)

Alternative cover

Professional ratings
Aggregate scores
Source	Rating
Metacritic	65/100
Review scores
Source	Rating
AllMusic	4/5 stars

Unexpected Guests is a compilation album by British-American rapper/producer MF Doom, released under the shortened pseudonym Doom. The album is made up of a collection of songs performed by, produced by or featuring Doom and previously released at various points throughout his career. It was released via Gold Dust Media in 2009.

== Critical reception ==
At Metacritic, which assigns a weighted average score out of 100 to reviews from mainstream critics, Unexpected Guests received an average score of 65% based on 7 reviews, indicating "generally favorable reviews".

== Track listing ==
No.	Title	Performer(s)	Length
1.	"Fly That Knot"	Talib Kweli; Doom	3:20
2.	"Sniper Elite"	J Dilla; Doom	1:57
3.	"Yikes"	Scienz of Life; Doom	1:03
4.	"Sorcerers"	KMD	3:02
5.	"Da Supafriendz"	Vast Aire; Doom	2:58
6.	"Quite Buttery"	Count Bass D; Doom	1:19
7.	"?"	Doom; Kurious	3:27
8.	"All Outta Ale"	The Prof; Doom	3:08
9.	"E.N.Y. House"	Masta Killa	2:34
10.	"Bells of Doom"	The Prof; Doom	2:32
11.	"My Favorite Ladies"	Doom	2:37
12.	"Street Corners (Doom Remix)"	Masta Killa; Inspectah Deck; GZA	3:38
13.	"Angels"	Doom; Ghostface	3:16
14.	"Fire Wood Drumstykx"	J Dilla; Doom	1:30
15.	"The Unexpected"	Babu; Doom; Sean Price	3:39
16.	"Project Jazz"	Hell Razah; Talib Kweli; Viktor Vaughn	3:39
17.	"Black Gold"	John Robinson	5:38
