= Black Bastards Ruffs + Rares =

EP by KMD
- Released: 1998
- Recorded: 1993
- Studio: Auntie Marlene's Basement
- Genre: Hip-hop
- Label: Fondle 'Em
- Producers: DJ Subroc; Zev Love X

KMD chronology
Mr. Hood (1991)	Black Bastards Ruffs + Rares (1998)	Black Bastards (2000)

MF Doom chronology
Mr. Hood (1991)	Black Bastards Ruffs + Rares (1998)	Operation: Doomsday (1999)

Black Bastards Ruffs + Rares is an EP containing rare and demo tracks by KMD from the album Black Bastards. It was released in 1998 on Fondle 'Em Records, available on 12" vinyl only. The EP contains eight tracks in total, four of which are instrumental.

== Track listing ==
A-side
No.	Title	Producer(s)	Length
1.	"Get You Now"	Subroc	2:58
2.	"Popcorn"	Subroc; Zev (co-prod.)	2:59
3.	"Contact Blitz"	Zev	2:21
4.	"Sweet Premium Wine"	Subroc	3:08

B-side
No.	Title	Length
1.	"Get You Now" (Instrumental)	5:07
2.	"Popcorn" (Instrumental)	3:30
3.	"Contact Blitz" (Instrumental)	2:30
4.	"Garbage Day III" (Instrumental)	3:28

== Credits ==
Credits are adapted from the EP's label.

- Chris Scott - mastering
- Subroc - producer (1, 2, 4)
- Zev - co-producer (2), producer (3)
