= Best of KMD =

Greatest hits album by KMD
- Released: 18 November 2003
- Recorded: 1990–1993
- Genre: Hip-hop
- Label: Nature Sounds

KMD chronology
Black Bastards (2000)	Best of KMD (2003)

Best of KMD is a compilation album by KMD, featuring tracks from the albums Mr. Hood and Black Bastards.

== Track listing ==
1. "Mr. Hood Meets Onyx/Subroc's Mission"
2. "Who Me?"
3. "Trial & Error"
4. "Hard Wit No Hoe"
5. "Mr. Hood Gets A Haircut"
6. "808 Man"
7. "Humrush"
8. "Nitty Gritty" (featuring Brand Nubian)
9. "Peachfuzz"
10. "Preacher Porkchop"
11. "Garbage Day 3"
12. "What A Niggy Know?"
13. "Sweet Premium Wine"
14. "Smokin' That S**t"
15. "Contact Blitt"
16. "Gimme"
17. "Black Bastards"
18. "It Sounded Like A Roc"
19. "Plumskinzz (Oh No I Don't Believe It!)"
20. "Popcorn"
21. "Nitty Gritty (Remix)" (featuring Lord Jamar, Sadat X & Busta Rhymes)
