= Expektoration =

Live album by MF Doom
- Released: 14 September 2010
- Recorded: 24 November 2004
- Genre: Hip-hop
- Length: 51:33
- Label: Gold Dust Media

MF Doom chronology
Unexpected Guests (2009)	Expektoration (2010)	Key to the Kuffs (2012)

Professional ratings
Aggregate scores
Source	Rating
Metacritic	61/100
Review scores
Source	Rating
AllMusic	3.5/5 stars
Pitchfork	6.0/10

Expektoration is a 2010 live album by British-American rapper/producer MF Doom, featuring Big Benn Klingon. Recorded in New York, this performance was originally released as a DVD packaged with the 2007 expanded edition of Mm..Food.

== Critical reception ==
At Metacritic, which assigns a weighted average score out of 100 to reviews from mainstream critics, the album received an average score of 61% based on 7 reviews, indicating "generally favorable reviews".

== Track listing ==
No.	Title	Length
1.	"Act 1 ("Hoe Cakes", "Kon Queso", "Kon Karne", "One Beer", "Beef Rapp", "Vomitspit", "Accordion", "Meat Grinder", "All Caps", "Curls", "Figaro", "People Places Things")"	30:06
2.	"Intermission"	1:36
3.	"Act 2 ("Go with the Flow", "Doomsday", "Hey!", "Rhymes Like Dimes", "Change the Beat", "The Fine Print")"	19:38
