= The Missing Notebook Rhymes =

Compilation album (unfinished) by Doom
- Released: August–September 2017
- Genre: Hip hop
- Length: 15:38
- Label: Adultswim.com
- Producers: MF Doom; Crummie Beats; The Alchemist; Astronote; J Dilla

MF Doom chronology
| NehruvianDoom (2014) | The Missing Notebook Rhymes (2017) | Czarface Meets Metal Face (2018) |

The Missing Notebook Rhymes is an unfinished compilation album partially released in 2017 by British-American rapper MF Doom under the shortened alias "Doom". The album was intended to be a 15-song compilation of rare or unreleased Doom tracks that would be released on Adult Swim's website one song a week for 15 weeks—however, on 27 September 2017 Adult Swim abruptly announced the cancellation of the project, just seven songs into its intended 15 song tracklist.

== Background ==
The Missing Notebook Rhymes was announced on 7 August 2017 on both Doom and Adult Swim's websites after Adult Swim received a folder from Doom containing 15 rare or unreleased songs. The first track, "Notebook 00 - Negus", was released on Adult Swim's website alongside the announcement. In an interview with Mass Appeal, Adult Swim creative director Jason DeMarco said, "They’re tracks that [Doom] either doesn’t have a home for, or they are part of other projects which aren’t necessarily complete, but we can sort of tease them. It’s sort of a peek at everything he has going on right now." The second track, "Notebook 01 - True Lightyears", was intended to double as the second Missing Notebook Rhyme and also as the first single from Doom's original group KMD's still-unreleased comeback album Crack In Time.

== Track listing ==
| No. | Title | Artist(s) | Length |
|---|---|---|---|
| 1. | "Notebook 00 - Negus" (featuring Doom) | Sean Price | 3:06 |
| 2. | "Notebook 01 - True Lightyears" (featuring Jay Electronica and Doom) | KMD | 2:25 |
| 3. | "Notebook 02 - Doomsayer" | Doom | 2:01 |
| 4. | "Notebook 03" | Doom | 3:03 |
| 5. | "Notebook 04" (featuring Kool Keith) | Doom | 2:29 |
| 6. | "Notebook 05 - No Refunds" | Viktor Vaughn | 1:24 |
| 7. | "Notebook 06 - Pause Tape" (Remix) | Doom | 1:10 |
| Total length: | | | 15:38 |

Professional ratings
Review scores
| Source | Rating |
|---|---|
| RapReviews | 7.5/10 |

=== Notes ===
- "Notebook 00 - Negus" also appeared on Sean Price's 2017 posthumous album Imperius Rex, which was released one day after the song's initial release as the first Missing Notebook Rhymes track.
- "Notebook 01 - True Lightyears" was intended to appear on KMD's comeback album Crack In Time, which remains unreleased.
- "Notebook 03"'s verse later appeared on the 2022 Danger Mouse and Black Thought song "Belize".
- "Notebook 06 - Pause Tape (Remix)" is an excerpt from the JJ Doom song "Pause Tape", released on the 2014 Bookhead EP, which cuts off just before the start of Jneiro Jarel's verse.

== Cancellation ==
On 26 September 2017, following the release of "Notebook 06 - Pause Tape (Remix)", Adult Swim removed The Missing Notebook Rhymes from their website. In a statement made the next day to Mass Appeal, an Adult Swim spokesperson stated, "Adult Swim is ending our relationship with Doom, and thus, the remaining Missing Notebook Rhymes will unfortunately have to remain…missing." No reason was officially given for the cancellation, with both Doom and Adult Swim declining to comment. The album's page on Adult Swim's website began redirecting to a cryptic short story called "What I Remember of the Crash", but soon just redirected to their homepage.

On 31 December 2020, in the wake of the announcement of Doom's passing, Jason DeMarco gave his explanation for why the project had been cancelled in a series of Tweets after three years of silence:

Flash forward to like a decade later and I hear Doom really wants to work with me again. After several talks with his management we came up with the idea of the Missing Notebook Rhymes. Of course, once we [Adult Swim] start releasing them, we find two things out: A) Doom hadn’t paid the producers who made these songs or cleared the other vocalists or samples (of course he told us he had it all cleared). B) Doom owed music to a record label. Literally anything he released he owed to them. He didn’t tell us this. So the label came after us[.] It was, in short, a total boondoggle and of course we had to shut it down and apologize to a lot of people and pay a ton of money to a bunch of others.

== Missing tracks ==
External link
- METALFACE – Doom's SoundCloud page with the eight songs theorized to have been intended for inclusion on The Missing Notebook Rhymes

The Missing Notebook Rhymes was cancelled with eight of its 15 songs still unreleased, leading to fans scouring the internet for the remaining tracks. Three weeks after the cancellation of the project, it was discovered that Doom's previously-unused SoundCloud page had suddenly began uploading new songs, the first of which was a Young Guru remix of the Missing Notebook Rhymes track "Notebook 02 - Doomsayer". Eight new tracks were uploaded in total, which have been theorized by many to be the eight missing tracks from the album.

Theorized completed track listing
| No. | Title | Artist(s) | Length |
|---|---|---|---|
| 8. | "DoomsayerSlayer.GuMix" | Doom | 2:20 |
| 9. | "Masquatch" (featuring Doom) | Flying Lotus | 1:50 |
| 10. | "Hydrochloric Acid" | Doom | 2:10 |
| 11. | "Highs and Lows" (featuring MF Doom and Phonte) | PRhyme | 4:38 |
| 12. | "In the Streets" (featuring MF Doom and BJ the Chicago Kid) | Busta Rhymes | 4:22 |
| 13. | "Chinatown Wars" | Ghostface Killah and Doom | 3:40 |
| 14. | "Reign... in the Subway" | Doom | 2:25 |
| 15. | "Lil Mufukuz" (featuring Doom) | Dabrye | 2:45 |

=== Notes ===
- "DoomsayerSlayer.GuMix" is a Young Guru remix of "Notebook 02 - Doomsayer".
- "Masquatch" was made for the 2013 video game Grand Theft Auto V.
- "Hydrochloric Acid" is an excerpt from the Westside Gunn and MF Doom song "2 Stings", released on the 2017 EP Westside Doom.
- "Highs and Lows" originally appeared in 2015 as a bonus track on the deluxe edition of PRhyme's self-titled album.
- "In the Streets" originally appeared on Busta Rhymes' 2015 mixtape The Return of the Dragon: The Abstract Went On Vacation.
- "Chinatown Wars" was made for the 2009 video game Grand Theft Auto: Chinatown Wars.
- "Reign... in the Subway" is an excerpt from the Czarface and MF Doom track "Nautical Depth", released on the 2018 album Czarface Meets Metal Face.
- "Lil Mufukuz" also appeared on Dabrye's 2018 album Three/Three.
