= Black Bastards =

Studio album by KMD
- Released: May 15, 2000
- Recorded: 1991 – August 1993
- Studios: Chung King Studios, New York, New York
- Genres: Hardcore hip-hop; boom bap
- Length: 44:07
- Labels: Readyrock; Metal Face; Sub Verse
- Producers: KMD; Subroc; Zev Love X

KMD chronology
Black Bastards Ruffs + Rares (1998)	Black Bastards (2000)	Best of KMD (2003)

MF Doom chronology
Operation: Doomsday (1999)	Black Bastards (2000)	MF EP (2000)

Singles from Black Bastards
- 1. "What a Nigga Know?" Released: March 8, 1994; 2. "It Sounded Like a Roc" Released: 1999

Black Bastards is the second and final studio album by American hip-hop group KMD, recorded in 1993 and eventually released on May 15, 2000, through Readyrock Records. Initially, the album was scheduled for release in May 1994, but Elektra Records canceled the album, reportedly due to the controversial cover art, which shows a Sambo figure being lynched, even though the catalog number 61535 was assigned to the release. Zev Love X's brother DJ Subroc was killed when he was struck by a car shortly before the album was completed, and subsequent releases of the album have featured dedications to him.

Elektra released promotional copies of Black Bastards and a single of "What a Nigga Know?" prior to the album's cancellation. After KMD's disbandment, rarities and demo tracks recorded during the making of Black Bastards were released on a vinyl-only EP titled Black Bastards Ruffs + Rares in 1998. The album was re-released in 2001 by Sub Verse Music and again in 2008 by MF Doom's own Metalface Records.

== Critical reception ==
Professional ratings
Review scores
Source	Rating
AllMusic	2.5/5 stars
Robert Christgau	A−
Pitchfork	8.4/10
RapReviews	6.5/10
The Rolling Stone Album Guide	3.5/5 stars
Spin	7/10

The album received generally positive reviews from music critics. Douglas Siwek of AllMusic said, "The sound of the record is very raw and sounds unfinished due to Elektra shelving the project, but it doesn't take away from the magic that would have made this a suitable follow-up [to KMD's debut album, Mr. Hood]." Steven Juon of RapReviews praised the album's lyrics but mentioned he "wish[ed] they would have taken a little more care in mastering and recording".

== Track listing ==
All tracks are written by Dingilizwe Dumile and Daniel Dumile.

Side 0
No.	Title	Producer(s)	Length
0.	"Garbage Day #3"	Subroc	2:14
1.	"Get-U-Now"	Subroc	2:27
2.	"What a Nigga Know?"	KMD	3:26
3.	"Sweet Premium Wine"	Subroc	3:09

Side 1
No.	Title	Producer(s)	Length
4.	"Plumskinzz. (Loose Hoe, God & Cupid)"	KMD	1:43
5.	"Smokin' That S*#%"	Subroc	4:40
6.	"Contact Blitt"	Zev Love X	2:42
7.	"Gimme"	KMD	3:50

Side 2
No.	Title	Producer(s)	Length
8.	"Black Bastards!"	Subroc	4:00
9.	"It Sounded Like a Roc"	Subroc	4:34
10.	"Plumskinzz. (Oh No I Don't Believe It!)"	Subroc	1:40

Side 3
No.	Title	Producer(s)	Length
11.	"Constipated Monkey"	KMD; Q4	2:47
12.	"F*#@ Wit' Ya Head"	KMD	4:35
13.	"Suspended Animation"	KMD	2:20
Total length:			44:07

Side 3 (2001 Sub Verse Music re-release)
No.	Title	Length
15.	"What a Nigga Know?" (Remix) (feat. MF Grimm)	3:36
16.	"Q3-113" (Bonus Track)	1:11
Total length:		48:54

== Personnel ==
Credits adapted from album's liner notes.

Personnel

- D.Dumile – production
- Daniel Dumile – production
- KMD – production

Additional personnel

- The CMOB – additional vocals
- Earthquake – additional vocals
- H2O – additional vocals
- J.Alvarez – additional vocals
- Lord Sear – additional vocals
- B.Thompson – bass guitar (11)
- Q4 – co-production (11)
- Sub – executive production
- Doom – executive production
- Cas – executive production
- Jay-G – executive production
- Yuri – executive production

Artwork

- The EMEF – cover illustration
- Scotch 79th – visuals
