= Rhymes Like Dimes =

Song by MF Doom featuring DJ Cucumber Slice

Song by MF Doom featuring Cucumber Slice

from the album Operation: Doomsday
- Released: October 19, 1999
- Genre: Hip-hop
- Length: 4:18
- Label: Fondle 'Em
- Songwriter: Daniel Dumile
- Producer: MF Doom

"Rhymes Like Dimes" is a song by British-American rapper MF Doom from his debut studio album Operation: Doomsday (1999). It features radio DJ Bobbito Garcia under the alias "Cucumber Slice". Produced by MF Doom himself, it contains a sample of "One Hundred Ways" by Quincy Jones featuring James Ingram.

== Background ==
MF Doom and Garcia recorded the song in the latter's bedroom. Instead of closing the song with a verse or hook, Doom handed Garcia a microphone and told him to talk. Garcia began saying random, wild combinations of words that came to his mind and laughed. He continued speaking such words and phrases when Doom was not responding. It eventually was included on the finished track, without regard for Slice's part or the audible peak it left.

== Composition ==
The song is built on a synth riff sampled from Greg Phillinganes' solo in "One Hundred Ways", while lyrically MF Doom brags about selling his music the way others deal drugs. He laments that "Only in America could you find a way to earn a healthy buck / And still keep your attitude on self-destruct", and also repeats a verse.

== Critical reception ==
In a review of Operation: Doomsday, Neil Drumming of CMJ New Music Monthly commented that MF Doom "flows in a rambling torrent that wobbles from first to third person and easily merits its own chamber right between RZA's jumble and Raekwon's pasta poetry", citing lyrics from "Rhymes Like Dimes" as an example. Ian Cohen of Pitchfork included the song's "entire-verse hook" as a reason why Operation: Doomsday is "above all else an extremely accessible album."

Uproxx ranked it as the best song by MF Doom, while Paste ranked it as his third best song.
