= Doomsday (MF Doom song) =

Song by MF Doom featuring Pebbles the Invisible Girl

Song by MF Doom

from the album Operation: Doomsday
- Released: 19 October 1999
- Genre: Hip-hop
- Length: 4:58
- Label: Fondle 'Em
- Songwriter: Daniel Dumile
- Producer: MF Doom

"Doomsday" is a song by British-American rapper MF Doom which appears on his debut studio album Operation: Doomsday. Produced by Doom himself, it contains samples of "Kiss of Life" by Sade and "Poetry" by Boogie Down Productions, as well as additional vocals by Pebbles the Invisible Girl.

== Background ==
In an interview with XXL, MF Doom stated about the song:

That's a while ago, so I'm trying to remember what inspired it. It's really just normally what I'd be talking about. I kinda do bragging rap. I do the kind of hip-hop where the MC is more pointing out things and accentuating certain things that have been forgotten at some stage. So I'm really just explaining hip-hop rules. Rules about rhyming. Typical shit that you would normally do or don't do. That's basically it.

Regarding the lyrics "Ever since the womb 'til I'm back where my brother went / That's what my tomb will say / Right above my government, Dumile", Doom said:

"Really, that's like saying my word is bond. There are certain instances where you use that phrase in life. In that reference, "what my tomb will say," that means "word to my death." It's really in general. That's just how we speak normally in the streets, so I don't wanna look too far into it. It's a normal thing. I'm just putting my stamp on it, like everything I say is justified in my heart."

== Composition ==
The song features boastful lyrics revolving around the exploits of MF Doom's villain alter ego and his disgust with MCs whose music are lower in quality, as well as pop culture references such as Jeopardy! and commercials of New York City-area furniture store Coronet. He explains his persona ("Definition 'super-villain': a killer who love children / One who is well-skilled in destruction, as well as building"), as he begins his reign and foresees his eventual fall. Pebbles the Invisible Girl provides soulful vocals to the song.

== Critical reception ==
In a review of Operation: Doomsday, Ian Cohen wrote, "While the autumnal, twinkling backdrops of 'Doomsday' or the Coral Sitar-laced 'Red and Gold' wouldn't upset tables at your local coffee shop, they provide a truly symbiotic relationship with the paradoxically gruff and calm persona Doom manifests here, where the villainy is more implied than anything."

Pitchfork included the song in their list of "10 Songs That Show Why MF DOOM Was the Ultimate Rapper's Rapper". Paste ranked it as MF Doom's second best song.

== Certifications ==
Region	Certification	Certified units/sales
New Zealand (RMNZ)	Platinum	30,000^{‡}
United Kingdom (BPI)	Silver	200,000^{‡}
^{‡} Sales+streaming figures based on certification alone.
