= Fondle 'Em Records =

- Founded: December 1995; 30 years ago
- Founder: Bobbito Garcia
- Defunct: November 2001; 25 years ago
- Status: Defunct
- Genre: East Coast hip hop; underground hip hop
- Country of origin: United States
- Location: New York City

Fondle 'Em Records was a hip hop record label founded and owned by Bobbito Garcia from 1995 to 2001, based in New York City. Garcia formed the label after realizing that the many unsigned rappers making guest appearances on The Stretch Armstrong and Bobbito Show, a program Bobbito co-hosted with DJ Stretch Armstrong on Columbia University radio station WKCR 89.9 FM, did not have a proper outlet for their talents.

Fondle 'Em, along with Rawkus Records, Solesides, Stones Throw Records and a handful of other small independent imprints helped jumpstart the underground hip hop scene in the late 1990s, on the east coast, establishing the subgenre as a viable branch of hip hop culture & rap music. It also introduced cult artist MF Doom, rescued acts such as the Juggaknots and KMD from major label limbo, and became one of the first US labels to release music from a South African rap act with Cashless Society's "Blazetha Breaks" 12".

== History ==
=== Beginnings ===
Bobbito started the vinyl-only Fondle ‘Em imprint in December 1995, partially as a joke. Most of the initial releases advertised the records as being released on "Fondle 'Em Records, A Division Of Tickle 'Em Label Group, A Subsidiary Of Squeeze 'Em Entertainment." Its first release was The Cenubites, a 7-song EP recorded by Kool Keith and Godfather Don. Many of the songs on The Cenubites originated as demo tapes the duo made for “The Stretch Armstrong/Bobbito Show,” as well as outtakes from the Ultramagnetic MCs' "The Four Horseman" project. (Later, both demand from fans, and Kool Keith's resurging popularity, led Fondle 'Em to reissue the project as The Cenobites LP, this time on CD as well as vinyl.) However, the popularity of the project led Bobbito to continue releasing music under the "Fondle 'Em" moniker.

Fondle 'Em's popularity continued to grow throughout the years of 1996 and 1997, with each successive year drawing more praise from critics:

"Bobbito Garcia's Fondle 'Em label is indie all the way, and is also one of the most consistently compelling underground hip-hop labels you'll find. And although it still isn't sending out any promos, true heads will want to buy every new release on the label, since there hasn't been a bum one yet. Fondle 'Em started out partly as a gag with the now-infamous EP put out by the Cenobites...but Garcia's impeccable, yet twisted, taste and underground connections through his 'Stretch & Bobbito' show on New York City's WKCR allow him to explore New York's fertile hip-hop underbelly, and document it on wax." - Brian Coleman, CMJ

During the late 1990s, Fondle ‘Em began to establish itself as an independent record label. It did not enjoy major label backing or private investment. No artists were actually signed to Fondle 'Em, and profits from their records were split 50/50 with them. No marketing budget was ever set, and it did not have a promotions department per se; rather, Fondle 'Em moved units on the strength of its artists' talent and Bobbito's penchant for sniffing out what he believed to be extremely talented up-and-comers in the New York indie rap scene.

All of the labels' releases were vinyl only, with the exception of the re-released Cenobites album, and MF Doom's Operation: Doomsday. Legendary Manhattan, New York record store Fat Beats distributed Fondle 'Em's products throughout the U.S., with rap mailorder site SandboxAutomatic.com handling the online distribution of the label's output.

Fondle 'Em pressed its titles in extremely limited quantities, rarely making more than a few thousand copies available for each one; the exceptions to this general rule were the CD releases, and pressings of those reached barely 100,000. As a result, the label's catalog is now highly sought after by collectors. Certain titles, particularly Siah and Yeshua DapoED's self-titled EP and the Juggaknots' album Clear Blue Skies, fetch high prices in online auctions and at swap meets.

=== Fondle 'Em & MF Doom ===
Fondle 'Em's best known artist was arguably MF Doom, the assumed name of former KMD member Zev Love X. Bobbito's relationship with MF Doom had begun in the early 1990s, through common friends and "Constipated Monkey" family member Kurious Jorge, who had released an album entitled A Constipated Monkey through Bobbito's first imprint Hoppoh Records, and Lord Sear (1973-2026), a common fixture on Bobbito and Stretch's radio show.

The label issued Zev's first two MF Doom singles in 1997, with a second following in 1998 and a full-length, entitled Operation: Doomsday in 1999. During the same period of time, the label issued unreleased KMD material from the Black Bastards sessions (a period from 1993 to 1994) in the form of two twelve-inch singles and an EP entitled Black Bastards Ruffs + Rares.

=== The End of Fondle 'Em ===
Near the end of 2001, Bobbito closed the label, and compiled the retrospective disc Farewell Fondle 'Em. Instead of issuing the album directly through Fondle 'Em, however, he chose fellow New York indie label Definitive Jux to release it, as a Fondle 'Em release under the Definitive Jux banner. In the liner notes for Farewell Fondle 'Em, Bobbito stated he selected Definitive Jux because it was carrying on the independent hip-hop tradition formerly championed by Fondle 'Em.

Many artists who recorded for Fondle 'Em would go on to enjoy moderate underground success for some years after the label's disestablishment in 2001, simply dispersing to other independent labels such as Bigg Jus's Sub Verse Music and DJ Mighty Mi's Eastern Conference Records. Some of these artists include Cage, the Arsonists, Scienz of Life and MF Grimm.

== Discography ==
=== Fondle 'Em Records Releases ===
1. FE001: Godfather Don & Kool Keith, "The Cenubites" EP
2. FE101: Godfather Don & Kool Keith, The Cenobites LP/CD
3. FE002: The Juggaknots, Clear Blue Skies LP
4. FE003: The Arsonists, "The Session/Halloween"
5. FE31: Arsonists, "Blaze/Geembo's Theme/Flashback"
6. FE004: Mr. Live, "Relax Y'self/Supa Dupa/Hunger Strike (feat. Tony Bones)"
7. FE005: Siah & Yeshua DapoED, '"The Visualz EP"
8. FE0052: Siah, "Repetition/Pyrite"
9. FE006: Lord Sear, "Alcoholic Vibes" b/w Stak Chedda, "My Hindu Love"
10. FE007: Cage, "Radiohead/Agent Orange"
11. FE72: Cage, "Mersh/4 Letter Word"
12. FE008: MF Doom, "Dead Bent/Gas Drawls/Hey!"
13. FE0082: MF Doom, "Greenbacks/Go With The Flow"
14. FE83: KMD, Black Bastards Ruffs + Rares EP
15. FE84: KMD, "What A Nigga Know/Constipated Monkey/Q3"
16. FE85: MF Doom, "The M.I.C./Red & Gold"
17. FE86: MF Doom, Operation: Doomsday 2LP/CD
18. FE87: Subroc/KMD, "It Sounded Like A Roc/Stop Smokin' That Shit"
19. FE009: Scienz of Life, "Powers of Nine Ether/The Anthem"
20. FE91: Scienz of Life, "Metaphysic/2000 and What to Expect!"
21. FEMF1: MF Grimm, "Do It For The Kids/Bloody Love Letter"
22. FEMF2: MF Grimm, "Landslide Remix/Tick Tick"
23. FEMF3: MF Grimm, "WWIII/Scars & Memories"
24. FETBC: The Boulevard Connection, Sut Min Pik EP
25. FENH1: Da Nuthouse, "A Luv Supreme/Synapsis/Very Vocabulary"
26. FEMHZ1: MHz (MegaHertz), "World Premier/Camu"
27. FEMHZ2: MHz (MegaHertz), "Rocket Science (feat. Jakki Tha Mota Mouth)/Magnetics/Absolutely Posolutely"
28. FEJT1: J-Treds, "Make It Happen/Praise Due"
29. FERO1: Rok One, "Certified Superior/Ninety Degrees A Piece"
30. FECK1: DJ Eli & Shan Boogs (Cloudkickers), "And So Kiddies... (feat. Cage) / Truly Gifted Ones (feat. Yeshua DapoED, J-Treds & Pumpkinhead)"
31. FEJAKK1: Jakki Tha Mota Mouth, "Widespread (feat. Copywrite of MHz)/The Chosen"
32. FEMEG: Megalon, "One In A Million/Peace To The Homeless"
33. FESA1: Cashless Society, "Blazetha Breaks" / Mizchif, "Place For A Wife"
34. FEYAK1: Y@k Ballz, "HomePiss/Nasty or Nice/The Plague/Flossin"

=== Fondle 'Em / Definitive Jux Releases ===
1. DJX016: Breezly Brewin, Q-Unique, Godfather Don, J-Treds, MF Doom & DJ Eli, "Fondle 'Em Fossils" / Dysfunctional Family, "Feelin' Da Highs" / "Fondle 'Em Fossils" (El-P Remix)
2. DJX019-2: Various Artists, Farewell Fondle 'Em Compilation

== See also ==
- List of record labels
