= Rapp Snitch Knishes =

Song by MF Doom

Song by MF Doom featuring Mr. Fantastik

from the album Mm..Food
- Released: 16 November 2004
- Genre: Hip-hop
- Length: 2:52
- Label: Rhymesayers
- Songwriters: Daniel Dumile; Mr. Fantastik
- Producer: MF Doom

"Rapp Snitch Knishes" (instrumental released as “Coffin Nails”) is a song by British-American rapper MF Doom featuring rapper Mr. Fantastik (whose identity is unconfirmed), taken from the former's fifth studio album Mm..Food (2004). It uses an instrumental titled "Coffin Nails" produced by MF Doom himself (under the alias Metal Fingers), which contains a sample of David Matthews' rendition of "Space Oddity" by David Bowie.

== Background ==
In an interview with XXL, MF Doom stated "At the time I wrote the song, I think I was with one of my boys and we stopped and got knishes that day. It's just something that resonated with me." He further explained:

Words that rhyme with knish...any aspect of that, how it sounds, how it can match with something in society. So "rap snitch" and "knishes" kinda go together. So it was easy to find a title. The challenge was coming up with good enough references to make a song.

== Composition ==
The production features a sped-up electric guitar riff, sampled from a cover of "Space Oddity", looping over a boom bap beat. Lyrically, it criticizes rappers who self-incriminate by rapping about crimes they committed in their own songs.

== Critical reception ==
David Jeffries of AllMusic wrote, "Mr. Fantastik gives fakes a proper whooping on the excellent 'Rapp Snitch Knishes.'" Nick Sylvester of Pitchfork also praised Mr. Fantastik's performance, writing he "hardly embarrasses himself". Rapper Mos Def said of the song in a video conversation with HipHopDX, "This song needs to be out, and it needs to be a hit."

Complex placed the song at number 22 on their list "The 50 Funniest Rap Songs". Paste ranked it number 12 in their list of "The 25 Best MF DOOM Songs".

== Certifications ==
Region	Certification	Certified units/sales
New Zealand (RMNZ)	Platinum	30,000^{‡}
United Kingdom (BPI)	Gold	400,000^{‡}
United States (RIAA)	Platinum	1,000,000^{‡}
^{‡} Sales+streaming figures based on certification alone.
