= Mr. Hood =

Studio album by KMD
- Released: 1991
- Recorded: 1989–1991
- Studio: Calliope (New York City)
- Genre: Hip-hop
- Length: 63:47
- Label: Elektra
- Producer: KMD; Stimulated Dummies

KMD chronology
Mr. Hood (1991)	Black Bastards Ruffs + Rares (1998)

Singles from Mr. Hood
- 1. "Peachfuzz" Released: 1990; 2. "Who Me?" Released: 1991; 3. "Nitty Gritty" Released: 1991

Mr. Hood is the debut studio album by the American hip-hop group KMD. It was released in 1991, via Elektra Records. The recording sessions took place at Calliope Studios in New York. The album was produced by KMD and Stimulated Dummies. Mr. Hood spawned three singles: "Peachfuzz", which peaked at No. 11 on the Hot Rap Songs, "Who Me?", which peaked at No. 19 on the Hot Rap Songs, and "Nitty Gritty", featuring Brand Nubian.

The album reached number 67 on the Billboard Top R&B Albums chart.

== Critical reception ==
Professional ratings
Review scores
Source	Rating
AllMusic	2/5 stars
Robert Christgau	(choice cut)
MusicHound R&B: The Essential Album Guide	4/5 stars
The Source	4/5 stars

Robert Christgau praised "Mr. Hood at Piocalle's Jewelry/Crackpot" and "Mr. Hood Gets a Haircut". The Washington Post determined that "the album's sampled funk, jazz and blues textures, especially on the xylophone-laced, labyrinthine lullaby 'Peachfuzz', are sure to rock the jeeps all summer."

In 2003, the album was ranked at number 98 on Pitchfork's "Top 100 Favorite Albums of the 1990s".

== Track listing ==
No.	Title	Producer(s)	Length
1.	"Mr. Hood at Piocalles Jewelry/Crackpot"	KMD	2:49
2.	"Who Me? (With an Answer from Dr. Bert)"	KMD	3:32
3.	"Boogie Man!"	Stimulated Dummies	3:49
4.	"Mr. Hood Meets Onyx"	KMD	2:13
5.	"Subroc's Mission"	KMD	4:00
6.	"Humrush"	Stimulated Dummies	3:26
7.	"Figure of Speech"	KMD	3:44
8.	"Bananapeel Blues"	KMD	3:55
9.	"Nitty Gritty" (featuring Brand Nubian)	KMD	5:35
10.	"Trial 'n Error"	KMD	4:09
11.	"Hard wit No Hoe"	DJ Subroc	3:53
12.	"Mr. Hood Gets a Haircut"	KMD	1:18
13.	"808 Man"	KMD	3:53
14.	"Boy Who Cried Wolf"	KMD	3:36
15.	"Peachfuzz"	KMD	4:00
16.	"Preacher Porkchop"	KMD	2:43
17.	"Soulflexin'"	KMD	3:52
18.	"Gasface Refill" (Bonus track)	KMD	3:45
Total length:			1:03:47

== Personnel ==
- Daniel Dumile – main artist, performer (tracks: 1–2, 6–11, 13–15, 17–18), producer
- Alonzo Hodge – main artist, performer (tracks: 3, 6, 9, 15, 17–18), producer
- Dingilizwe Dumile – main artist, performer (tracks: 5–6, 9, 17–18), producer
- Maxwell Dixon – featured artist, performer (track 9)
- Lorenzo Dechalus – featured artist, performer (track 9)
- Derek Murphy – featured artist, performer (track 9)
- John Gamble – producer (tracks: 3, 6), engineering
- Dante Ross – producer (tracks: 3, 6), A&R
- John 'Geeby' Dajani – producer (tracks: 3, 6)
- Michael Berrin – executive producer
- Peter J. Nash – executive producer
- Thomas Coyne – mastering
- Carol Bobolts – art direction
- Arthur Cohen – photography
- Arthur Leipzig – photography

== Charts ==
Chart (1991)	Peak position
US Top R&B/Hip-Hop Albums (Billboard)	67
