= NehruvianDoom =

NehruvianDOOM

Studio album by NehruvianDOOM
- Released: October 7, 2014
- Recorded: 2013–2014
- Genre: Hip-hop
- Length: 31:09
- Label: Lex Records
- Producer: Madvillain; MF Doom

MF Doom chronology
Bookhead EP (2014)	NehruvianDoom (2014)	The Missing Notebook Rhymes (2017)

Bishop Nehru chronology
Brilliant Youth EP (2014)	NehruvianDoom (2014)	Nehruvia: The Nehruvian EP (2015)

NehruvianDoom (subtitled Sound of the Son) is the collaborative studio album by American hip-hop duo NehruvianDoom which consisted of MF Doom and Bishop Nehru. The album was released on October 7, 2014, by Lex Records.

== Background ==
In January 2014, during an interview with The Village Voice, Bishop Nehru spoke about the album, saying: "Well it's titled NehruvianDoom. It's Doom producing the beats and I'm rapping over them, though he's going to be on some of the songs too. We don't have any outside features, it's just me and him." He explained how the album came about, saying: "I met Doom for the first time a couple of months ago when I went to London. It was my first time out there, I opened for him and Ghostface at the 100 Club and I just happened to run into him after the show and we met like that and we kicked it and talked like that." In a March 2014, interview with XXL, Bishop Nehru elaborated on the album, saying: "It's called Nehruvian Doom, it's going to be about seven songs. There's no way to really explain it. It's just kind of its own little feel, its own little sound. I don't think anything really compares to it." MF Doom added: "As like a compilation of sounds, all of them hold they own weight but as one whole thing, a piece, it's going to be a very informative piece. It's going to be that joint... To me, everything happened organically and it's still going organically, so it's hard to explain it as it's happening. It just is what it is."

== Critical response ==
Professional ratings
Aggregate scores
Source	Rating
Metacritic	67/100
Review scores
Source	Rating
ABC News	4.5/5 stars
Consequence of Sound	B
Drowned In Sound	8/10
Exclaim!	9/10
HipHopDX	4/5 stars
Pitchfork Media	5.6/10
Tiny Mix Tapes	2.5/5 stars
XXL	3/5 (L)

NehruvianDoom received generally positive reviews from music critics. At Metacritic, which assigns a normalized rating out of 100 to reviews from critics, the album received an average score of 67, which indicates "generally favorable reviews", based on 13 reviews. Mark Bozzer of Exclaim! said, "It's great to have Doom back on this release, and it's even better that's he's joined forces with a young emcee in Nehru that shows a hell of a lot of promise on this project. The Metal-Faced Villain and his sidekick Bishop Nehru make quite the dynamic duo, indeed; Batman and Robin ain't got shit on these two." Sam Willis of Drowned In Sound stated, "Throughout NehruvianDoom the production is consistently on point, vocals are sharp and the shining talent of Bishop Nehru is given to us in all its glory. There are lines that exhibit the teenager’s wisdom way beyond his years and a relationship that is as much give as it is take for both parties. It doesn’t seem to me that this is the record to propel Nehru to stardom – Doom still works too much on the peripherals for that – but it is a vital step on the road to widespread notoriety." Nate Patrin of Pitchfork Media was less positive, saying, "This generation-crossing collaboration feels like a record lodged in a sort of chronological rut, one where a young artist fronts an old-sounding record that sounds like it could've been released at any point in his lifetime—and helmed by any number of MCs that could've sounded like him."

Michael Madden of Consequence of Sound said, "It's promising that a kid as talented and hungry as Bishop already has the experience of working with someone with several classics under his belt. And, while NehruvianDoom is solid on its own, he’s still working toward his destination." Henry Mansell of XXL said, "Weighing in at a terse 32 minutes in length, spanning eight tracks plus an introduction, the album is a cohesive and methodical offering yet because of the constrained spin time, neither Bishop Nehru nor MF Doom have the space to flex their creative impulses and push the envelope in their respective spheres. While it’s gratifying to hear the duo stick to their established formulas and not poorly attempting to conform to pop platitudes, NehruvianDoom suffers from monotonous chants (see “Coming For You”) and a simple lack of variety." Andrew Gretchko of HipHopDX stated, "In just nine tracks, the duo have created a brief, quirky and dense project. It is an album that’s experimental in almost all the right ways, filled with well-crafted, albeit ominous beats mined from obscure source material and features an impressive one two punch on the mic. NehruvianDoom isn’t the first attempt to recreate Golden Age Hip Hop in the 21st century, but it’s an exceptionally creative take on the now-classic sound that succeeds in offering an enjoyable -- and at times quirky -- listen."

In December 2014, Nehruviandoom featured widely in Album of the Year and Rap Album of the Year lists, including: #2 in The Village Voice, #8 in The Independent, #13 in Spin, #23 in Rolling Stone, #29 ABC News, #94 in Crack Magazine.

== Track listing ==
No.	Title	Producer(s)	Length
1.	"Intro"	MF Doom	1:48
2.	"Om"	MF Doom	3:01
3.	"Mean the Most"	MF Doom	4:54
4.	"So Alone"	MF Doom	2:37
5.	"Darkness (HBU)"	MF Doom	2:49
6.	"Coming For You"	MF Doom	4:16
7.	"Caskets"	MF Doom	4:51
8.	"Great Things"	MF Doom	3:50
9.	"Disastrous"	Madvillain	3:03

iTunes bonus track
No.	Title	Producer(s)	Length
10.	"They Say Bishy Bish"	Bishop Nehru	4:40

== Charts ==
Chart (2014)	Peak position
US Billboard 200	59
US Top Rap Albums (Billboard)	4
US Top R&B/Hip-Hop Albums (Billboard)	10
US Independent Albums (Billboard)	11
US Indie Store Album Sales (Billboard)	17
