= DJ Subroc =

American hip-hop musician (1973–1993)

- Born: Dingilizwe Dumile; August 3, 1973; East Meadow, New York, U.S.
- Died: April 23, 1993 (aged 19); NY 878, Nassau County, New York, U.S.
- Occupations: DJ, rapper, producer
- Years active: 1988–1993
- Relatives: MF Doom (brother)
- Musical career
- Origin: Long Beach, New York, U.S.
- Genre: Hip hop
- Label: Elektra (1990–1993)
- Formerly of: KMD

Dingilizwe Dumile (August 3, 1973 – April 23, 1993), known professionally as DJ Subroc, was an American hip-hop artist who was a member of KMD alongside his brother MF Doom, as well as a member of Constipated Monkeys.

== Biography ==
Dumile was born on August 3, 1973, at Nassau County Medical Center on Long Island, and was raised primarily on Long Beach, New York. He was the brother of rapper MF Doom.

Dumile's first group, KMD was formed by him and his brother Zev Love X, who would later be known as MF Doom, along with Jade 1, who would later be known as Rodan, but who was eventually replaced by Onyx the Birthstone Kid. Their first release was the LP Mr. Hood, released by Elektra Records, in 1991.

In 1993, Dumile cofounded a group called Monsta Island Czars with his brother Doom and his friends Grim, Kurious, Tommy Gunn, and Rodan. Dumile also did further production for artists like 3rd Bass, his fellow Monsta Island members MF Grimm, Rodan, Megalon (aka Tommy Gunn), and Kurious Jorge.

Dumile died on April 23, 1993, after being hit by a motorist while attempting to cross the Nassau Expressway (NY 878). His death brought production of the KMD album Black Bastards to a halt and marked the end of KMD, although Black Bastards was later released.

MF Doom dedicated his 2004 track "Kon Karne" to his late brother with the lyric, "I dedicate this mix to Subroc, the hip-hop Hendrix". Doom also speaks about him frequently in his album Operation: Doomsday, dedicating tracks to his passed brother. A Tribe Called Quest shouted out DJ Subroc in their song "8 Million Stories", and the Kurious track "Leave Ya' with This" from the album A Constipated Monkey is also dedicated to him.
