= Operation: Doomsday =

1999 studio album by MF Doom

Studio album by MF Doom
- Released: 19 October 1999
- Recorded: 1997–1999
- Genres: Underground hip-hop; alternative hip-hop; lo-fi hip-hop; jazz rap
- Length: 58:20
- Labels: Fondle 'Em; Metal Face; Sub Verse
- Producer: MF Doom

MF Doom chronology
Black Bastards Ruffs + Rares (with KMD) (1998)	Operation: Doomsday (1999)	Black Bastards (with KMD) (2000)

Singles from Operation: Doomsday
- 1. "Dead Bent" / "Gas Drawls" / "Hey!" Released: 1997; 2. "Greenbacks" / "Go with the Flow" Released: 1997; 3. "The M.I.C." / "Red & Gold" Released: 1998; 4. "I Hear Voices Pt. 1" Released: 2001 (2001 re-release)

Operation: Doomsday is the debut solo studio by MF DOOM. It was first released through Fondle 'Em Records on 19 October 1999, and reissued by Sub Verse Records in 2001 with a slightly altered track listing. It was his first solo release under the MF Doom moniker after previously performing as Zev Love X in the group KMD. Operation: Doomsday is regarded as one of the most influential albums in independent hip-hop history. A deluxe remastered version was released by Doom's label Metal Face Records on 24 October 2011.

== Background ==
Following his debut in the late-1980s, Daniel Dumile, then known as Zev Love X, suffered a series of unfortunate setbacks, including the death of his brother and fellow KMD member DJ Subroc and the subsequent abandonment of the group's second studio album Black Bastards by Elektra Records due to its political message and cover art. After the untimely death of his brother and the disbanding of KMD in 1993, Zev Love X left the hip-hop community and would suffer years of homelessness and despair. Dumile described himself during this period as living "damn near homeless, walking the streets of Manhattan, sleeping on benches". In 1997 he would re-emerge as MF Doom, covering his face at shows and releasing singles on Bobbito Garcia's label Fondle 'Em Records. The three singles released generated enough buzz for Garcia to agree to sign Doom for an album.

== Recording and production ==
Operation: Doomsday was produced by Dumile, mostly over a three-week period in which he stayed at DJ Stretch Armstrong's apartment and borrowed his Akai MPC2000 and MPC3000 workstations. Doom incorporated a variety of musical styles onto the album, featuring a mix of 1980s soul and smooth jazz loops with vintage drum breaks. Throughout the album several skits and sound collage tracks containing cartoon samples are littered, oftentimes utilizing scenes from the 1967 Fantastic Four animated series featuring Doctor Doom.

== Music and lyrics ==
As an underground rap album, Operation: Doomsday is a lo-fi recording, with MF Doom producing bedroom electro. Despite being an earthly work born from tragedy, it revisits the cartoon pleasure of late-1980s hip-hop. The debut album features dense rhyme schemes over tracks composed from a collage of R&B, cartoon samples and elevator music. It is embroidered with an array of samples and snippets, ranging from Hanna-Barbera cartoon series Fantastic Four and Scooby-Doo to 1982 hip-hop film Wildstyle to English sophisti-pop band Sade. Operation: Doomsday indulges in quiet storm balladry that evokes a sense of loss, expressing smooth jazz loops which bring balance to muffled soundscapes. Throughout the album, MF Doom effectually rhymes over the original musical backgrounds atop minimal percussion.

The backstory of Operation: Doomsday is similar to that of Marvel Comics supervillain Doctor Doom, with a series of terrible setbacks and tragedy culminating in the birth of a villainous persona. After suffering the devastating death of his brother and the dropping of his group from their record label, MF Doom, formerly known as Zev Love X, was left emotionally scarred. His lingering pain manifested in the form of a masked hip-hop supervillain who wishes to rule the world for its own good on Operation: Doomsday. In addition, the debut album features thematic skits and interludes which continue the comic book narrative beginning in the opening track all through to a spoken word monologue by E. Mason alongside guest appearances from MF Doom's Monsta Island Czars collective.

With an erratic thought process, MF Doom delivers sharp-witted stream-of-consciousness rhymes in a deteriorating yet steadfastly murky flow. At the center of Operation: Doomsday lies a bent towards free-form lyricism and pop-culture references. Doom uses a raw and lyrically dexterous delivery to recite palatable, off-kilter rhymes containing obscure references. His abstract rapping is laced with disparate word association grounded by tongue-in-cheek humor. Much of the album's lyrical content displays MF Doom in emotional disorder. The solo debut album acts as a lengthy exercise in musical therapy, with death hanging over throughout, both musically and lyrically. Drawing from the weight of his past, Operation: Doomsday is compact with frank, sincere lyrics and hard, piercing rhymes.

== Release and promotion ==
After the departure of KMD from their label Elektra Records, MF Doom released his solo debut album, Operation: Doomsday through the independent record label Fondle 'Em Records in 1999. The studio album was re-released through Sub Verse Music in 2001.

It was announced on 16 December 2010 that Operation: Doomsday was being reissued in 2011. The reissue cover was designed by Jason Jagel, who did the art for Mm..Food. It was reported that there were licensing issues with the original artwork, which was designed by the famed graffiti writer Keo X-Men, that caused problems with reissuing. Stones Throw Records stated that Doom was working on a track-listing for the reissue.

== Critical reception ==
Professional ratings
Review scores
Source	Rating
AllMusic	3.5/5 stars
Alternative Press	3/5
The A.V. Club	A
CMJ New Music Monthly	(favorable)
Muzik	5/5
NME	6/10
Pitchfork	8.9/10
Record Collector	4/5 stars
Spin	8/10
The Village Voice	B+

Upon its release, Operation: Doomsday garnered praise from contemporary music journalists, and has since achieved status as a cult classic. Alternative Press said the debut "places an insightful spin on Doom's history on the rap game ... the mish-mashed musical styles that MF incorporates lend a bit of variety, and the generally lo-fi production values give the album character. Refreshing..." Writing for The Village Voice, rock critic Robert Christgau remarked, "As concept, this could get tedious fast, but as a few skits it's one more scenic sonic on an album that reaches its high point when it samples not just the Scooby-Doo theme but Scoob himself, thus acknowledging that, as Scoob knows so well, some villains are just plain evil." He concluded, "Right, the album never comes into full focus. But it does flow, as music and as signifying. Message: this smart guy had some horrible setbacks and came out on the other side. A role model, you might say." AllMusic's Cyril Cordor stated, "For the hardcore Doom fans, the recorded-in-the-basement quality is appealing and representative of his persona as the underdog who 'came to destroy rap.' ... Even though this album is certainly not for everyone, you can easily respect from where the man is coming." Jason Draper of Record Collector opined, "Doom may have become more accomplished – not least recording with Madlib and Danger Mouse – but this outside attack launched the bomb, and made MF Doom the leftfield hero that he remains today."

Pitchfork's Ian Cohen described the album as Doom's "warmest and most benevolent work, almost entirely bled of the angrier material that would mark future releases." Their review of the 2011 reissue also called the album "a must-hear in just about any format." In his review of the 2011 reissue, Nathan Rabin from The A.V. Club argued that since its initial release Operation: Doomsday has "attained mythic status; its legend has grown in proportion to its relative unavailability, and to Doom’s ascent to cult godhood." On the album's 20th anniversary, Stereogum described it as "an immediately engaging display of [Doom's] raw talent as both a rapper and producer, as well as an engrossing origin story for the most popular of his many alter-egos." In a less enthusiastic review, Spin writer Jon Caramanica claimed, "Sewn together with snippets from the Fantastic Four and Wildstyle, the album is a rambling exercise in musical therapy." He concluded, "But Doom ain't no joker: he’s merely fulfilling KMD's mythology ... six years too late."

=== Accolades ===
Publication	Country	Accolade	Year	Rank
About.com	US	100 Best Hip-Hop Albums	2015	97
Complex	US	25 Best Long Island Rap Albums	2012	5
Consequence of Sound	US	Top 20 Hip-Hop Solo Albums	2013	9
Fact	UK	The 100 Best Albums of the 1990s	2012	37
Fact	UK	100 Best Indie Hip-Hop Records of All Time	2015	6
Hip-Hop Connection	US	The 100 Greatest Rap Albums 1995-2005	2006	3
Spin	US	Best Reissues of 2011	2012	8

== Legacy ==
Operation: Doomsday has been heralded as an underground classic that established MF Doom's rank within the underground hip-hop scene during the early to mid-2000s. The album has had a vast, long-lasting influence on contemporary underground rap and independent hip-hop artists. Writing for streaming service Tidal, Dylan Green and Donna-Claire Chesman called the album, "a blueprint for all of independent rap." They cite the "dusty cartoon samples" of its lo-fi production, MF Doom's preference for keeping anonymous, his "stream-of-consciousness flows" and the self-sustainance ethos that led to self-producing the entire studio album himself as essential elements both driving Operation: Doomsday as well as serving a source of inspiration for countless artists worldwide.

== Track listing ==
All tracks were written and produced by MF Doom.

Side Zero
No.	Title	Length
1.	"The Time We Faced Doom" (Skit)	2:04
2.	"Doomsday"	4:58
3.	"Rhymes Like Dimes" (featuring Cucumber Slice)	4:19
4.	"The Finest" (featuring Tommy Gunn)	4:01
5.	"Back in the Days" (Skit)	0:46

Side One
No.	Title	Length
1.	"Go with the Flow"	3:36
2.	"Tick, Tick…" (featuring MF Grimm)	4:05
3.	"Red and Gold" (featuring King Ghidra)	4:43
4.	"The Hands of Doom" (Skit)	1:52
5.	"Who You Think I Am?" (featuring X-Ray, Rodan, Megalon, K.D., King Ghidra, and Kong (Note: Feature credits in the 2001 re-release are listed as King Ceasar, Rodan, Megalon, Kamakiras, and Kong))	3:24

Side Two
No.	Title	Length
1.	"Doom, Are You Awake?" (Skit)	1:13
2.	"Hey!"	3:47
3.	"Operation: Greenbacks" (featuring Megalon)	3:49
4.	"The Mic"	3:04
5.	"The Mystery of Doom" (Skit)	0:24

Side Three
No.	Title	Length
1.	"Dead Bent"	2:22
2.	"Gas Drawls"	3:46
3.	"?" (featuring Kurious)	3:09
4.	"Hero vs. Villain" (Epilogue) (featuring E.Mason)	2:59
Total length:		58:21

Notes

- MF Doom is credited as a feature on the tracks "Red and Gold" and "Who You Think I Am?" under the alias "King Ghidra".

== Personnel ==
Credits are adapted from the albums' liner notes. (Note: The three major releases of this album on Fondle 'Em Records, Sub Verse Music, and Metal Face Records each have different credits in their liner notes.)

=== 1999 Fondle 'Em Records release ===
Personnel

- MF.Doom – production

Additional personnel

- Daniel Dumile (Note: Credited as "MF.Doom" on the 2008 Metal Face Records re-release.) – executive production
- Percy Carey (Note: Credited as "MF.Grim" on the 2008 Metal Face Records re-release.) – executive production
- Big Lou – executive production
- Bobbito – executive production
- Pebbles – additional vocals (2, 14)

Artwork

- Doom – illustration
- Scotch 79 – art direction

=== 2001 Sub Verse Music re-release ===
Personnel

- Metal Fingers Doom – production
- D.J. Cucumber Slice – cuts (3), additional vocals (3)
- Big Lou – co-production (10)
- X-Ray Da Mindbenda – co-production (2, 14)
- Pebbles the Invisible Girl – additional vocals (2, 14)
- Ill-Clown – co-production (4)

Additional personnel

- Metal Fingers Doom – mixing
- MF Doom – executive production
- MF Grimm – executive production
- Big Lou – executive production
- Bobbito – executive production

== Charts ==
Chart performance for Operation: Doomsday
Chart (2021–2024)	Peak position
Scottish Albums (Official Charts)	38
UK Album Downloads (Official Charts)	42
UK Albums Sales (OCC)	37
UK Independent Albums (Official Charts)	13
UK R&B Albums (Official Charts)	2
US Billboard 200	109
US Independent Albums (Billboard)	17
US Top R&B/Hip-Hop Albums (Billboard)	34
