= Mm..Food =

2004 studio album by MF Doom

Studio album by MF Doom
- Released: 16 November 2004
- Genre: Alternative hip-hop
- Length: 48:57
- Label: Rhymesayers
- Producers: Doom the Metal Fingered Villain; Madlib; Count Bass D; PNS

MF Doom chronology
VV:2 (2004)	Mm..Food (2004)	The Mouse and the Mask (2005)

Alternative cover
- 20th anniversary edition cover

Singles from Mm..Food
- 1. "One Beer" Released: 30 March 2004; 2. "Hoe Cakes" Released: 9 November 2004

Mm..Food is the fifth studio album by British-American rapper and producer MF Doom, released through Rhymesayers on 16 November 2004. Mm..Food is a concept album, with its main focus around different foods. On the album, there are common metaphors and double entendres throughout, with many being hip hop or food related, like rap feuds (which are also known as rap beefs) on the song "Beef Rapp", or "edible wrappers" [sic] on the sound collage instrumental "Gumbo".

Mm..Food features guest appearances from Count Bass D, Angelika, 4ize and Mr. Fantastik. The album would receive critical acclaim for Doom's dense wordplay, the production by Doom himself and other producers like Madlib, and its food inspired concept.

== Music and concept ==
MF Doom described Mm..Food as a concept album "about the things you find on a picnic, or at a picnic table". The album's titles and lyrics contain references to different foods, some with common metaphors and double entendres in the "street world" and the "nutritional realm". The title Mm..Food is an anagram of "MF Doom".

The album is primarily produced by MF Doom, except for the tracks "Potholderz", produced by Count Bass D; "One Beer", produced by Madlib and originally intended for the joint Madlib and MF Doom album Madvillainy; and "Kon Queso" produced by PNS of Molemen.

"Kon Queso" was originally released under the name "Yee Haw" on a 12 inch single in July 2003 with Molemen. The track was re-recorded for Mm..Food with a more laidback performance from MF Doom. "Vomitspit" is a new version of the song "Vomit", with a different beat and some changed lyrics. The original release of the album included a different version of "Kookies". It was removed due to an unlicensed sample from Sesame Street, and was promptly changed to a simpler version of the song in all future physical and digital releases.

== Album cover ==
The album cover's art director was Jeff Jank, and painting by Jason Jagel. The original painting included a blunt that was later edited out.

== Critical reception ==
Professional ratings
Aggregate scores
Source	Rating
Metacritic	81/100
Review scores
Source	Rating
AllMusic	5/5 stars
Alternative Press	4/5
The Boston Phoenix	3/4 stars
Entertainment Weekly	B+
The Guardian	3/5 stars
HipHopDX	4.0/5
NME	7/10
Pitchfork	7.5/10 (2004); 9.0/10 (2024)
Uncut	4/5 stars
URB	4/5 stars

Mm..Food garnered acclaim upon release. At Metacritic, it was given an average score of 81, based on 22 reviews, indicating "universal acclaim". Ryan Dombal of Entertainment Weekly wrote, "Mm..Food flips countless edible metaphors over hard-hitting, jazzy beats, while never devolving into pointless parody." David Jeffries of AllMusic called it "as vital as anything he's done before and entirely untouched or stymied by the hype." Pitchfork's Nick Sylvester called Mm..Food "an attempt to make good on Doom's almost fascist conceit to restore rap's golden age despite its loss of innocence." Nathan Rabin of The A.V. Club called the album "a crazy pastiche tied loopily together around obsessions with food, comic books, and supervillainy" and wrote that Doom is "exempt from the law of diminishing returns."

In 2012, Stereogum named it the best MF Doom album. In 2015, NME named it "one of the 23 maddest and most memorable concept albums."

== Commercial performance ==
The album peaked at number 17 on Billboard's Independent Albums chart, and number 9 on the Heatseekers Albums chart.

=== Singles ===
In August 2024, MF Doom received a posthumous RIAA Gold certification for two singles released from Mm..Food, "Hoe Cakes" and "One Beer". The following month, he received a posthumous Platinum certification for the song "Rapp Snitch Knishes".

== Track listing ==
All tracks written and produced by MF Doom, except where noted.

Mm..Food track listing
No.	Title	Producer(s)	Length
1.	"Beef Rapp"		4:39
2.	"Hoe Cakes"		3:54
3.	"Potholderz" (featuring Count Bass D)	Count Bass D	3:20
4.	"One Beer"	Madlib	4:18
5.	"Deep Fried Frenz"		4:59
6.	"Poo-Putt Platter"		1:13
7.	"Fillet-O-Rapper"		1:03
8.	"Gumbo"		0:49
9.	"Fig Leaf Bi-Carbonate"		3:19
10.	"Kon Karne"		2:51
11.	"Guinnessez" (featuring Angelika and 4ize)		4:41
12.	"Kon Queso"	PNS	4:00
13.	"Rapp Snitch Knishes" (featuring Mr. Fantastik)		2:52
14.	"Vomitspit"		2:48
15.	"Kookies"		4:02
Total length:			48:57

Notes

- The original release of the album included a different version of "Kookies". It was removed due to an unlicensed sample from Sesame Street, and was promptly changed to a simpler version of the song in all future physical and digital releases.

== Personnel ==
Credits are adapted from the album's liner notes.

Production

- Doom the Metal Fingered Villain – production (1, 2, 5–11, 13–15)
- Count Bass D – production (3)
- Madlib – production (4)
- PNS of the Molemen – production (12)

Additional personnel

- Daniel Dumile – executive production
- Jasmine Thomas – executive production
- Alfred P. Morgan (Note: In all future releases, Alfred P. Morgan is excluded from the liner notes.) – executive production
- Brent "Abu Shiddiq" Sayers – executive production

Artwork

- Jason Jagel – artwork
- Jeff Jank – design
- Adam R Garcia – design and layout

== Bonus discs ==
Mm..Food was packaged with two different bonus discs by two different online retailers. HipHopSite.com sold the album with a bonus disc called Mm..LeftOvers while Sandbox Automatic sold copies with the bonus disc Mm..More Food.

=== Mm..LeftOvers ===
Mm..LeftOvers

Compilation album by MF Doom
- Released: 16 November 2004
- Genre: Alternative hip-hop
- Length: 28:06
- Labels: Rhymesayers; HipHopSite.com
- Producers: MF Doom; Prince Paul; Drum & Knowledge

Mm..LeftOvers is a bonus disc containing throwaway tracks and remixes from Mm..Food which was given away with copies of the album purchased from HipHopSite.com or from Rhymesayers' Fifth Element location; four of these tracks would be later repurposed for the 20th anniversary edition of Mm..Food. The CD contains a recipe for "Villainous Mac & Cheese" on the back cover, attributed to "Grammy Dumile". The track "Hot Guacamole" was originally recorded for MC Paul Barman's 2002 album Paullelujah! and appeared in the 22-track version of Mm..Food that leaked to the internet, sequenced after "Guinnesses", but is absent from the final track listing.

No.	Title	Producer(s)	Length
1.	"It Ain't Nuthin'" (The Chapter Remix)		2:53
2.	"Hoe Cakes" (Ant Remix)		3:17
3.	"My Favorite Ladies" (KMD Remix)		2:22
4.	"Change The Beat" (Inhumanz remix)		3:09
5.	"Hot Guacamole" (featuring MC Paul Barman)	Prince Paul	1:43
6.	"Hoe Cakes" (Jake One Remix)		2:56
7.	"One Beer" (Madlib Remix)		2:55
8.	"All Outta Ale" (The Professor Meets the Supervillain)		2:42
9.	"Vomit" (featuring Parallel Thought)	Drum & Knowledge	2:58
10.	"Hoe Cakes" (Beatboxapella)		3:11
Total length:			28:06

=== Mm..More Food ===
Sandbox Automatic sold copies of Mm..Food packaged with the bonus disc Mm..More Food which contains tracks from MF Doom (tracks 1 and 2), John Robinson Project (track 3), and Rodan (tracks 4–9), a rapper from the hip-hop collective Monsta Island Czars which Doom was a part of.

Mm..More Food

Compilation album by MF Doom
- Released: 16 November 2004
- Genre: Alternative hip-hop
- Length: 31:34
- Label: Sandbox Automatic
- Producers: MF Doom; Shadetek; M. Moreau; DJ Y.S.

No.	Title	Producer(s)	Length
1.	"Blunt Drunk" (All Outta Ale Remix)		2:42
2.	"My Favourite Ladies" (Latinas Remix)		2:38
3.	"There She Goes" (featuring MF Doom & Lil Sci)		3:25
4.	"Ruler of Day and Night"	M. Moreau; MF Doom (co.)	4:18
5.	"Mineral Kingdom"	DJ Y.S.	3:30
6.	"Witchcraft II"	Shadetek	2:17
7.	"Ruler of Day and Night" (Instrumental)	M. Moreau; MF Doom (co.)	4:18
8.	"Mineral Kingdom" (Instrumental)	DJ Y.S.	3:30
9.	"Witchcraft II" (Instrumental)	Shadetek	4:56
Total length:			31:34

== Charts ==
2004 chart performance for Mm..Food
Chart (2004)	Peak position
US Billboard Independent Albums	17
US Billboard Heatseekers Albums	9

2021–2024 chart performance for Mm..Food
Chart (2021–2024)	Peak position
Australian Albums (ARIA)	28
Belgian Albums (Ultratop Flanders)	158
Belgian Albums (Ultratop Wallonia)	197
Canadian Albums (Billboard)	67
German Albums (Offizielle Top 100)	19
Scottish Albums (Official Charts)	5
Swedish Physical Albums (Sverigetopplistan)	18
UK Albums (Official Charts)	64
UK Independent Albums (Official Charts)	3
UK R&B Albums (Official Charts)	2
US Billboard 200	18
US Billboard Independent Albums	1
US Billboard Catalog Albums	1
US Top R&B/Hip-Hop Albums (Billboard)	5

== Certifications ==
Certifications for Mm..Food
Region	Certification	Certified units/sales
Denmark (IFPI Danmark)	Gold	10,000^{‡}
United Kingdom (BPI)	Silver	60,000^{‡}
United States (RIAA)	Gold	500,000^{‡}
^{‡} Sales+streaming figures based on certification alone.
