= KMD =

American hip hop trio

- KMD circa 1991; left to right: Zev Love X, Subroc, and Onyx

Background information
- Also known as: Kausing Much Damage; A Positive Kause in a Much Damaged Society
- Origin: Long Beach, New York, U.S.
- Genres: East Coast hip-hop; golden age hip-hop; hardcore hip-hop; boom bap
- Years active: 1987–1994
- Labels: Elektra; Fondle 'Em; ReadyRock; Sub Verse
- Past members: Zev Love X; DJ Subroc; Onyx the Birthstone Kid; Jade 1 (Rodan)

KMD (K.M.D., Kausing Much Damage, or A Positive Kause in a Much Damaged Society) was an American hip hop trio active from 1987 to 1994, during the golden age. The core of the group was composed of brothers Zev Love X (Daniel Dumile) and DJ Subroc (Dingilizwe Dumile). The group's original third member, Jade 1 (believed to later be known as Rodan), left before the group signed with Elektra Records, being replaced with Onyx the Birthstone Kid. The group dissolved in 1994 following the sudden death of DJ Subroc in 1993, the departure of Onyx and conflicts with Elektra that resulted in them being dropped from the label.

KMD released two studio albums, Mr. Hood (1991) and Black Bastards; the latter of which was recorded in 1993 and not officially released until 2000. Zev Love X subsequently changed his moniker to MF Doom and achieved success as a solo artist. MF Doom attempted to revive the KMD name in the 2010s, releasing two new songs, "Sorcerers" and "True Lightyears", and announcing a comeback album in 2017, but no further updates or recordings surfaced before his death in October 2020.

== History ==
Zev Love X, DJ Subroc, and Jade 1 formed KMD in Long Beach, New York, in 1987. The three were Black Muslims active in the Nuwaubian Nation. KMD began as a graffiti crew; they also practiced breakdance.

Onyx the Birthstone Kid soon replaced Jade 1, who left the group in order to finish high school. MC Serch, a native of nearby Far Rockaway, met the group at community functions and recruited them for a guest spot on "The Gas Face," a single off 3rd Bass' The Cactus Album. The guest appearance caught the attention of A&R executive Dante Ross, who signed KMD to Elektra Records.

KMD released their debut album Mr. Hood in 1991. Its songs focus on racism and black empowerment in a comical manner. Subroc heavily sampled old children's television shows and recordings, including drops of Sesame Street character Bert on the singles "Who Me?" and "Humrush." Skits featuring KMD interacting with "Mr. Hood" (a series of samples from a language instruction tape) tie the album together. Stimulated Dummies co-produced Mr. Hood; the album also featured fellow Five Percenters, Brand Nubian appearing on "Nitty Gritty." Around the same time Mr. Hood was released, Zev Love X and Onyx testified before the United States Congress in support of the National Voter Registration Act, on behalf of Rock the Vote.

The group recorded their follow up, Black Bastards, in 1993. The album was a departure from their lighthearted previous release with songs celebrating sex ("Plumskinzz"), drugs ("Smokin' That Shit", "Contact Blitt", "Suspended Animation (A Grey Expansion)"), and drinking ("Sweet Premium"). Onyx left the group during the recording sessions. His verse was removed from "Plumskinzz" (the B-side to the "Nitty Gritty" single off Mr. Hood), which was included on Black Bastards as two separate tracks, "Plumskinzz (Loose Hoe, God & Cupid)" (Zev Love X's verse) and "Plumskinzz (Oh No I Don't Believe It)" (Subroc's verse). Zev Love X created the cover art, a Sambo caricature being hanged in a game of hangman.

Shortly before finishing Black Bastards, Subroc was killed while attempting to cross the 878 Nassau Expressway on April 23, 1993. Zev Love X completed the album alone over the course of the next months and advance copies were finally sent out in early 1994. "What a Nigga Know?" was released as the first single in March that same year and Black Bastards was announced to be released on May 3, 1994. Soon afterwards Elektra Records unexpectedly cancelled the album and dropped KMD. The album's title and cover art proved too controversial for Elektra's management, who instructed Dante Ross to give Zev Love X the Black Bastards master tapes and $20,000 as incentive to leave the label. The album was heavily bootlegged until it was officially released on ReadyRock Records in 2000. Zev Love X dropped out of the New York hip hop scene until 1997, when he reemerged as MF Doom.

On August 16, 2017, MF Doom premiered the first new KMD track in eight years, "True Lightyears", on NPR Music. It was the first single from KMD's still-unreleased comeback album Crack In Time and featured Jay Electronica and MF Doom. The track was also released as part of MF Doom's 2017 compilation album The Missing Notebook Rhymes.

MF Doom died on October 31, 2020, with the cause of death originally not being revealed. In July 2023 it had been reported that Doom died of angioedema.

== Members ==
- Zev Love X (Daniel Dumile) (1988—1993, 2017—2020, died 2020)
- DJ Subroc (Dingilizwe Dumile) (1988—1993, died 1993)
- Onyx the Birthstone Kid (Alonzo Djihuti Hodge) (1988—1993)
- Jade 1 (1988)

== Discography ==
=== Albums ===
==== Studio albums ====
List of studio albums
Title	Album details
Mr. Hood	Released: May 14, 1991; Label: Elektra; Formats: CD, LP, cassette, digital download
Black Bastards	Released: May 15, 2000; Label: Readyrock Records; Formats: CD, LP, cassette, digital download
Crack In Time	Released: TBA; Label: Metal Face Records / Nature Sounds

==== Compilation albums ====
List of compilation albums
Title	Album details
Best of KMD	Released: November 18, 2003; Label: Nature Sounds; Formats: CD, LP

=== EPs ===
- Black Bastards Ruffs + Rares (1998, Fondle 'Em)
  - Released only on 12" vinyl.

=== Singles ===
- "Peachfuzz / Gasface Refill" (1990) from Mr. Hood.
- "Who Me? / Humrush" (1991) from Mr. Hood.
- "Nitty Gritty / Plumskinzz" featuring Brand Nubian (1991) from Mr. Hood.
- "What a Nigga Know?" (1994) from Black Bastards.
- "It Sounded Like a Roc" (1999) from Black Bastards.
- "Notebook 01 - True Lightyears" featuring Jay Electronica and Doom (2017) from Crack In Time.

=== Music videos ===
- "Peachfuzz" (1991)
- "Who Me?" (1991)
- "What A Niggy Know?" (1994) - Unreleased
