= MF Doom =

British and American rapper (1971–2020)

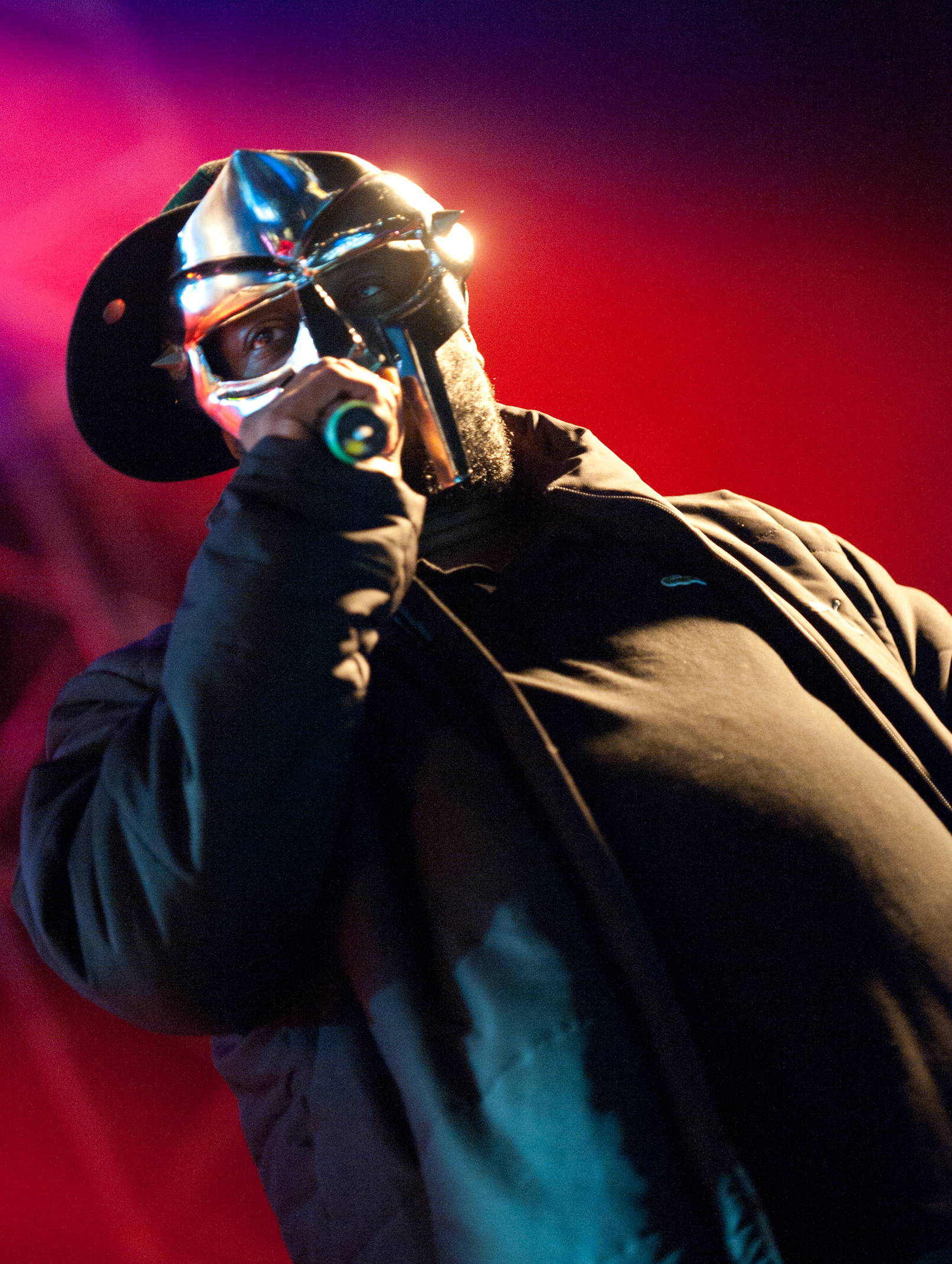
- Dumile in 2011
- Born: Dumile Daniel Thompson; July 13, 1971; London, England
- Died: October 31, 2020 (aged 49); Leeds, England
- Other names: Zev Love X; King Geedorah; Viktor Vaughn; Metal Fingers; Doom; Metal Face
- Spouse: Jasmine Dumile
- Children: 5 (Note: One child is deceased.)
- Relatives: DJ Subroc (brother)
- Musical career
- Origin: Long Beach, New York, U.S.
- Genres: East Coast hip-hop; alternative hip-hop; underground hip-hop; jazz rap
- Occupations: Rapper; songwriter; record producer
- Instruments: Vocals; sampler; drum machine
- Works: MF Doom discography; production discography
- Years active: 1987–1993; 1997–2020
- Labels: Metal Face; Fondle 'Em; Stones Throw; Nature Sounds; Lex; Rhymesayers; Elektra
- Formerly of: KMD; Monsta Island Czars; Madvillain; Danger Doom; DOOMSTARKS; JJ Doom; NehruvianDoom
- Website: gasdrawls.com

Daniel Dumile (Note: Dumile's birth certificate provides his name as "Dumile Daniel Thompson". Variations like "Daniel Dumile Thompson" and "Dumile Thompson Dumile" appear in other records. In his life as a public figure, "Daniel Dumile" was the name most commonly used to refer to him.) (/ˈduːməleɪ/ DOO-mə-lay; born Dumile Daniel Thompson; July 13, 1971 – October 31, 2020), also known by his stage name MF Doom or simply Doom (both mostly stylized in all caps), was a British and American rapper, songwriter, and record producer. Noted for his intricate wordplay, signature metal mask, and "supervillain" stage persona, he became a major figure of underground hip hop and alternative hip hop in the 2000s, and has been widely regarded as one of the greatest and most influential lyricists in hip hop.

Dumile was born in London, England and raised in Long Beach, New York. He began his career in 1988 as a member of the hip-hop trio KMD, performing as Zev Love X. The group disbanded in 1993 following the death of his younger brother DJ Subroc. After a hiatus, Dumile reemerged in the late 1990s performing at open mic events while wearing a metal mask resembling that of the Marvel Comics supervillain Doctor Doom, who is depicted on the cover of his 1999 debut solo album Operation: Doomsday. He adopted the MF Doom persona and rarely made unmasked public appearances thereafter.

During Dumile's most prolific period, the early to mid-2000s, he released the acclaimed Mm..Food (2004) as MF Doom, as well as albums released under the pseudonyms King Geedorah and Viktor Vaughn. Madvillainy (2004), recorded with the producer Madlib under the name Madvillain, is often cited as Dumile's magnum opus and is regarded as a landmark album in alternative hip hop. Madvillainy was followed by another acclaimed collaboration, The Mouse and the Mask (2005), with the producer Danger Mouse, released under the name Danger Doom.

Though he lived most of his life in the United States, Dumile never naturalized as a U.S citizen and struggled to obtain lawful permanent residency. In 2010, after returning from an international tour for his sixth and final solo album, Born Like This (2009), the United States Department of Homeland Security denied him entry and found him "unlawfully present", forcing him to return to England. Dumile worked mostly in collaboration with other artists during his final years, releasing albums with Jneiro Jarel (as JJ Doom), Bishop Nehru (NehruvianDoom), and Czarface (Czarface Meets Metal Face, and the posthumous Super What?). In 2020, he died in a Leeds hospital from angioedema following a reaction to a blood pressure medication. After his death, Variety described him as one of hip hop's "most celebrated, unpredictable and enigmatic figures".

== Early life ==
Daniel Dumile was born Dumile Daniel Thompson in Hounslow, West London, on July 13, 1971, the son of a Trinidadian mother and Zimbabwean father. According to Dumile, he was conceived in the United States where his parents lived, and was born in London when his mother was visiting family. As a child, Dumile moved with his family to Long Beach, New York, on a non-immigrant B-2 visa, where he grew up in a black nationalist Muslim household as part of the Five-Percent Nation. He had four younger siblings, including the rapper DJ Subroc, with whom he formed the rap group KMD, until Subroc was struck and killed by a motorist at the age of 19.

Dumile said he had no memory of his childhood in London and identified more with New York. When Dumile was three years old he was approved by the United States Immigration and Naturalization Service for permanent resident status. However, due to a lack of funds, his family could not file his paperwork. Dumile remained a British citizen his entire life and never naturalized as a U.S citizen. As a child, he was a fan and collector of comic books, and earned the nickname "Doom" (a phonetic play on the name Dumile) among friends and family. Dumile started DJing during third grade.

== Career ==
=== 1988–1997: KMD, brother's death, and hiatus ===
Dumile as Zev Love X (left) with fellow KMD members DJ Subroc and Onyx the Birthstone Kid in 1991

Under the name Zev Love X, Dumile formed the hip-hop group KMD in 1988 with his younger brother DJ Subroc and Rodan, who was later replaced by Onyx the Birthstone Kid. A&R representative Dante Ross learnt of KMD through the hip-hop group 3rd Bass and signed them to Elektra Records. Their recording debut came on 3rd Bass's song "The Gas Face" on The Cactus Album, followed in 1991 by their debut album Mr. Hood. Dumile performed the last verse on "The Gas Face"; according to Pete Nice's verse on the track, Dumile created the phrase.

On April 23, 1993, just before the release of the second KMD album, Black Bastards, Subroc was struck by a car and killed while crossing the Long Island Expressway. Dumile completed the album alone over the course of several months, and it was announced with a release date of May 3, 1994. KMD was dropped by Elektra, and the album went unreleased due to its controversial cover art, which featured a cartoon of a stereotypical pickaninny or sambo character being hanged.

After his brother's death, Dumile retreated from the hip hop scene from 1994 to 1997, living "damn near homeless, walking the streets of Manhattan, sleeping on benches". In the late 1990s, he settled in Atlanta; he had moved to Georgia in the mid-90s. According to Dumile, he was "recovering from his wounds" and vowing revenge "against the industry that so badly deformed him". Black Bastards had been bootlegged by that time, but was not officially released until 2000.

=== 1997–2001: Operation: Doomsday and production work ===
In 1997 or 1998, (Note: Sources differ on when precisely Dumile first performed with his face obscured.) Dumile began freestyling incognito at open-mic events at the Nuyorican Poets Café in Manhattan, obscuring his face by putting tights over his head. He turned this into a new identity, MF Doom, with a mask similar to that of Marvel Comics supervillain Doctor Doom. He later adopted a mask based on the one worn by Maximus, the protagonist of the 2000 film Gladiator.

Bobbito Garcia's Fondle 'Em Records released Operation: Doomsday, Dumile's first full-length LP as MF Doom, in 1999. Dumile's collaborators on Operation: Doomsday included fellow members of the Monsta Island Czars collective, for which each artist took on the persona of a monster from the Godzilla films. Dumile went by the alias "King Geedorah", (Note: Also spelled "Ghidora" or "Ghidra") a three-headed golden dragon space monster modeled after King Ghidorah. The album's productions sampled cartoons including Fantastic Four, something that became a staple of his music later on. Jon Caramanica, in a review of Operation: Doomsday for Spin, emphasized the contrast between Dumile's flow as Zev Love X in KMD and his revised approach as a solo artist: "Doom's flow is muddy, nowhere near the sprightly rhymes of KMD's early days, and his thought process is haphazard". Caramanica revisited Operation: Doomsday in The New York Times in 2021, calling it "one of the most idiosyncratic hip-hop albums of the 1990s, and one of the defining documents of the independent hip-hop explosion of that decade". Cyril Cordor, in a review for AllMusic, described Operation: Doomsday as Dumile's "rawest" lyrical effort.

In 2001, Dumile began releasing his Special Herbs instrumentals series under the pseudonym Metal Fingers. In a review of a 2011 box set containing ten volumes of the Special Herbs series, Pitchfork observed that the instrumentals stand on their own without vocal tracks: "most of these tracks sound plenty 'finished' even in rhyme-less form".

=== 2002–2004: King Geedorah, Viktor Vaughn, and Madvillainy ===
In 2003, Dumile released the album Take Me to Your Leader under his King Geedorah moniker. In Pitchfork, Mark Martelli described Take Me to Your Leader as close to a concept album, noting how it lays out the "mythos" of the eponymous King Geedorah. Martelli praised the album, particularly tracks such as "One Smart Nigger" which, in his view, were superior to other artists' attempts at political hip hop. Fact, in a brief notice for a 2013 reissue of Take Me to Your Leader, called it "arguably the most cinematic" of Dumile's albums from the turn of the 21st century. Later in 2003, Dumile released the LP Vaudeville Villain under the moniker Viktor Vaughn (another play on Doctor Doom, who is also known as Victor von Doom). NME described the Viktor Vaughn persona as "a time travelling street hustler". Pitchfork named Vaudeville Villain the week's best new album and highlighted its lyricism, writing that Dumile was one of the best writers in rap.

Dumile's breakthrough came in 2004 with the album Madvillainy, created with producer Madlib under the group name Madvillain. They recorded the album in a series of sessions over two years before a commercial release on March 23, 2004. Madvillainy was a critical and commercial success, and has since become known as Dumile's masterpiece. Also in 2004, Dumile released VV:2, a follow-up LP under the Viktor Vaughn moniker. Nathan Rabin noted in The A.V. Club that VV:2, coming as it did after the commercial and critical success of Madvillainy, represented an unusual career choice for Dumile whereby he went "deeper underground" instead of embracing wider fame.

Later in 2004, the second MF Doom album Mm..Food was released by Rhymesayers Entertainment. Pitchfork gave the album a positive review. Nathan Rabin described it as a "crazy pastiche" but argued that it grew more coherent on repeated listening. Around this time, he also appeared in a voice role in the Adult Swim animated series Perfect Hair Forever as Sherman the giraffe.

=== 2005–2009: Danger Doom, Born Like This, and Ghostface collaboration ===
Although still an independent artist, Dumile took a bigger step towards the mainstream in 2005 with The Mouse and the Mask, a collaboration with the producer DJ Danger Mouse under the group name Danger Doom. The album, released on October 11, 2005, by Epitaph and Lex Records, was developed in collaboration with Cartoon Network's Adult Swim and featured voice actors and characters from its programs (mostly Aqua Teen Hunger Force). The Mouse and the Mask reached No. 41 on the Billboard 200. Critic Chris Vognar, discussing the role of comedy in hip hop, argued that "Doom and Danger exemplify an absurdist strain in recent independent hip-hop, a willingness to embrace the nerdy without a heavy cloak of irony". In the same year, Dumile appeared on the second Gorillaz album, Demon Days, on the track "November Has Come".

Dumile produced tracks for both of Ghostface Killah's 2006 albums Fishscale and More Fish. In February 2013, Ghostface Killah said that he and Dumile were in the process of choosing tracks for a collaborative album. In 2015, Ghostface Killah announced that the album, Swift & Changeable, would be released in 2016, and later posted promotional artwork for the collaboration. It remains unreleased.

Dumile's Born Like This was released on Lex Records on March 24, 2009. The album was Dumile's first solo album to chart in the US. In a largely favorable review for Pitchfork, Nate Patrin cast the album as a return to form for Dumile, following a period of limited output. He observed that Dumile's lyrics and flow—"a focused rasp that's subtly grown slightly more ragged and intense"—were darker than on earlier records. He also highlighted the overtly homophobic "Batty Boyz", a diss track against unnamed rappers. Steve Yates, reviewing the album in The Guardian, likewise saw Born Like This as hearkening back to Dumile's earlier output. Yates felt it presented Dumile at "his scalpel-tongued, scatter-mouthed best". Both Patrin and Yates noted the influence of Charles Bukowski on Born Like This: the first line of Bukowski's poem "Dinosauria, We" gives the album its title.

=== 2010–2021: Move to the UK and later collaborations ===
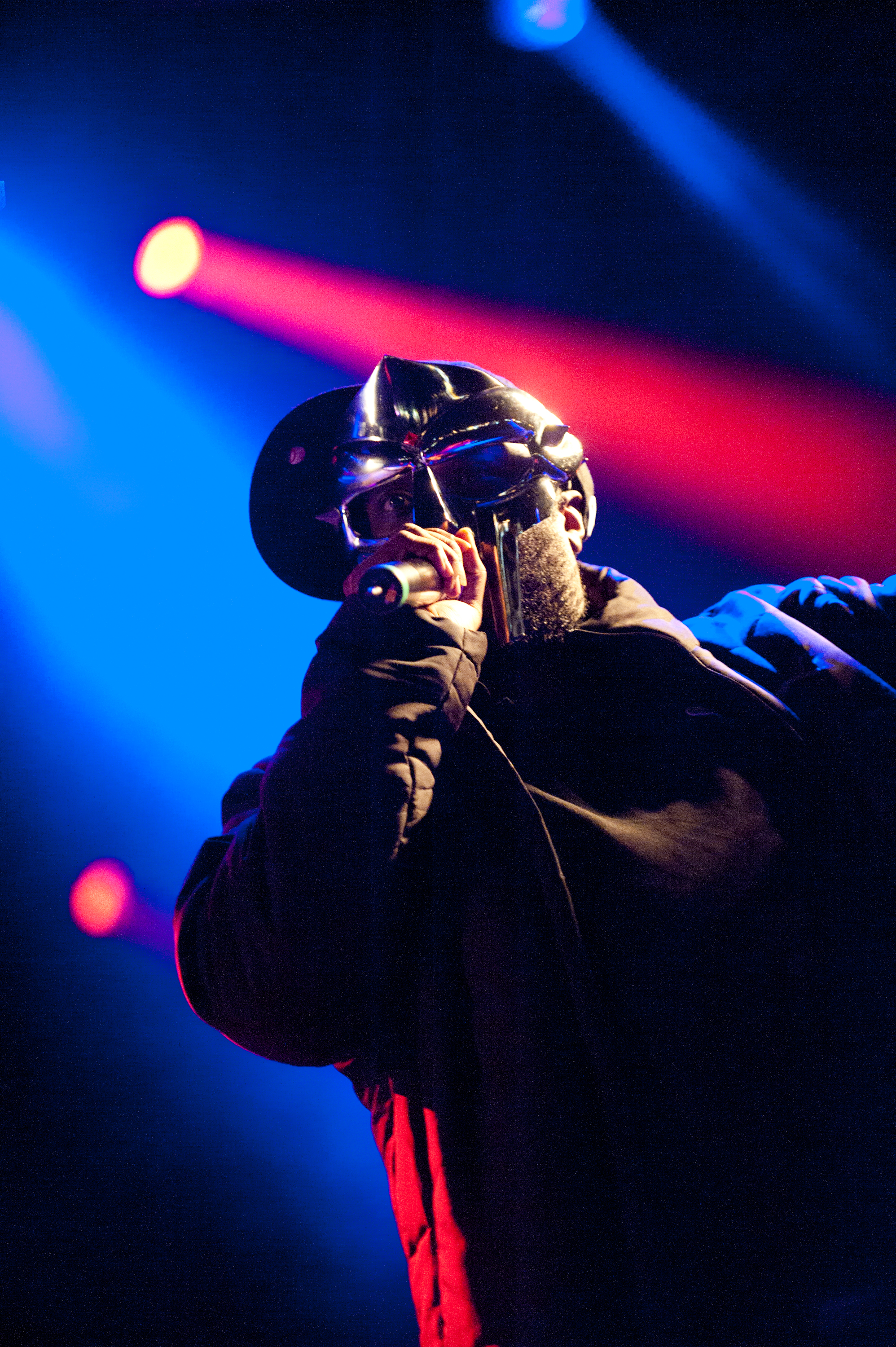
Dumile performing in July 2011.

In early 2010, Dumile released the EP Gazzillion Ear on Lex Records, a compilation of remixes of "Gazzillion Ear" from Born Like This, including a remix by Thom Yorke and two mixes by Jneiro Jarel. A further remix by Madvillain featuring a voicemail message from Kanye West was released online. The EP coincided with Dumile's first performances outside North America. On March 5, 2010, Lex and Sónar presented the first Doom show in London, at the Roundhouse in Camden. Expektoration, Dumile's second live album, was released on September 14, 2010, through Gold Dust. In a review of Expektoration, Pitchfork noted that Dumile's vocal performance was more energetic than on his recordings, which it characterized as "laidback" by comparison.

After completing his European tour, Dumile was refused re-entry into the United States. He settled in the United Kingdom in 2010. Key to the Kuffs, an album Dumile made in collaboration with the producer Jneiro Jarel as JJ Doom, was released on August 20, 2012, and included guest features from Damon Albarn, Beth Gibbons of Portishead, Khujo of Goodie Mob and Dungeon Family, and Boston Fielder. Reviews of Key to the Kuffs in Pitchfork and Fact emphasized its references to Dumile's "exile" in the United Kingdom, while Resident Advisor noted its play on Britishisms in tracks like "Guv'nor".

NehruvianDoom, Dumile's collaboration with the rapper Bishop Nehru, was released on October 7, 2014. Dumile produced all the tracks on NehruvianDoom, often using beats developed in the Special Herbs series; vocals are primarily Nehru's, with some contributions from Dumile. The album was Nehru's major label debut. The limitations of Nehru's artistic achievement on the album were stressed by critics due to his relative youth (he was still in his teens when the album was produced) and the album's briefness, lasting just over 30 minutes. Dumile's contributions were also seen as limited: Pitchfork wrote that he often seemed on "autopilot", and XXL suggested that neither he nor Nehru were able to "push the envelope".

In August 2017, Adult Swim announced a Doom compilation, The Missing Notebook Rhymes, that would consist of songs from his upcoming projects and featured appearances on other artists' songs. The Adult Swim website was to release one new song per week over the course of 15 weeks. However, the arrangement was canceled in September after the release of only seven tracks.

In February 2018, Dumile and Czarface released "Nautical Depth", the first single from their collaborative album Czarface Meets Metal Face. The album was released on March 30, 2018. In a lukewarm review for Pitchfork, Mehan Jayasuriya compared verses by Open Mike Eagle favorably to Dumile's, but noted that Dumile's contribution to "Nautical Depth" exhibited his "once razor-sharp lyricism". Ben Beaumont-Thomas, in The Guardian, was more positive, noting Dumile's "stoner surrealism" in "Captain Crunch".

Aside from the album with Czarface, Dumile's musical output in the final three years of his life was limited to one-off guest appearances on other artists' tracks. Posthumous releases included appearances on two songs for the video game Grand Theft Auto Online: "Lunch Break", with Flying Lotus; and "The Chocolate Conquistadors", with BadBadNotGood, made for the game's content update The Cayo Perico Heist. Shortly after Dumile's death was announced, Flying Lotus revealed that they had been working on an EP. Dumile's second album with Czarface, Super What?, was released in May 2021. It was completed in early 2020 but delayed due to the COVID-19 pandemic.

In January 2021, the Stones Throw Records founder Peanut Butter Wolf said that Dumile had been recording Madvillainy 2 at the time of his death. Dumile and Madlib began working on it shortly after Madvillainy's release, but Dumile would only record a few times a year; by the time of his death, Dumile estimated it was "85% done". Peanut Butter Wolf said he had permission from Dumile's family to release 11 songs Dumile submitted in 2009, though he was unsure if he would. In April 2023, Madlib said he planned to finish Madvillainy 2.

=== Metalface Records ===
Dumile had his own record label, Metalface Records (also stylized Metal Face Records). In 2008, the label made available KMD's Black Bastards, which Elektra Records had shelved before its planned 1994 release. in 2011, it issued a "Lunchbox Edition" of his debut solo album Operation: Doomsday, packaged with a lunchbox, playing cards, bonus tracks and instrumentals, and a book of the album's lyrics with new artwork. In 2015, Metalface reissued Black Bastards again, as a children's pop-up book.

Since Dumile's death in 2020, the label has worked with Rhymesayers Entertainment, which has collaborated with his estate on reissues. In February 2023, Metalface and Rhymesayers announced vinyl reissues of Black Bastards, recorded in 1993, to mark the thirtieth anniversary of its recording, and of Operation: Doomsday; both were scheduled for release on March 31. In September 2025, the two labels reissued Metal Fingers Presents: Special Herbs, the instrumental series Dumile released between 2001 and 2005, on colored vinyl for the first time, along with CD and cassette editions.

== Artistry ==
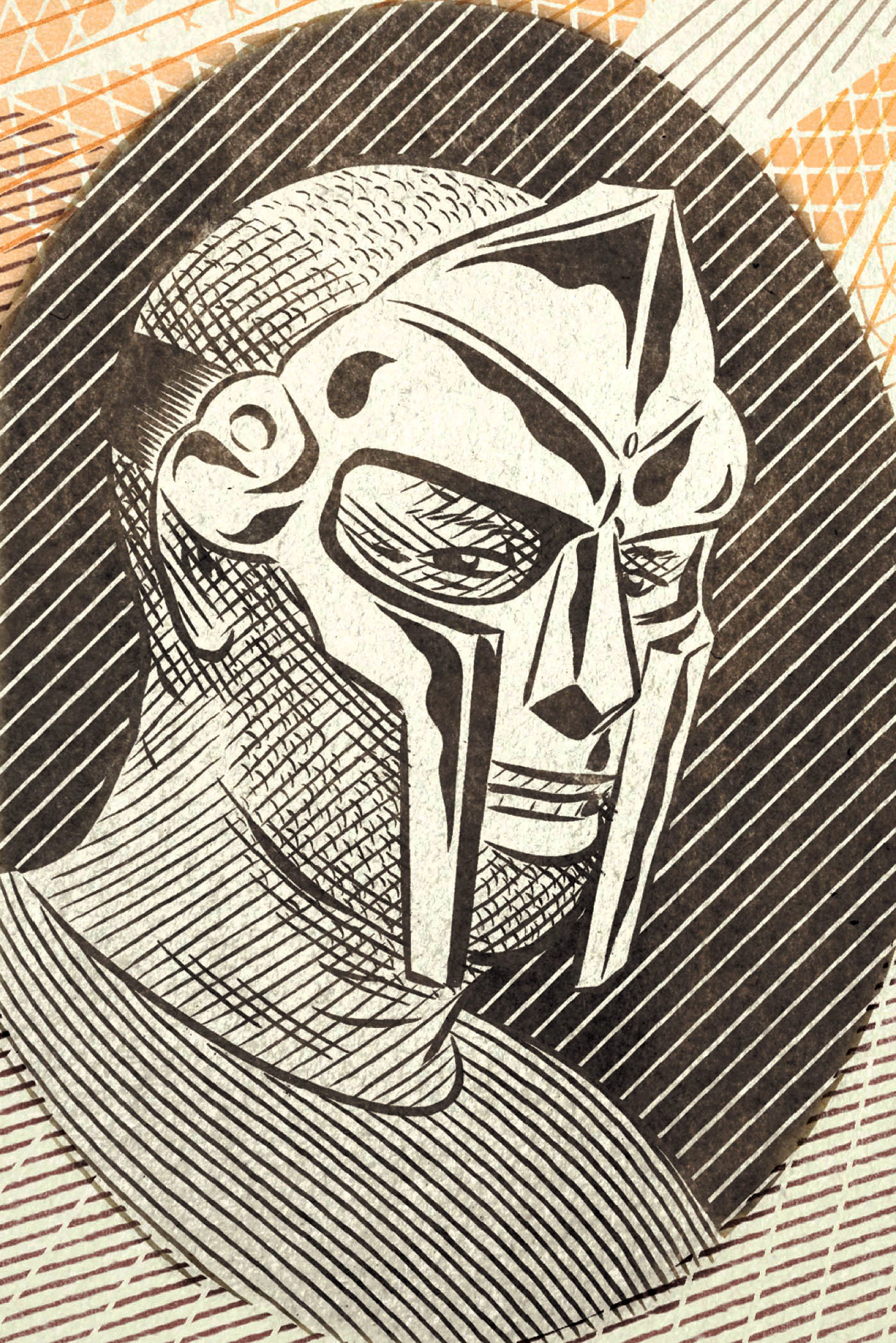
Portrait illustration of Dumile from a poster promoting his 2011 Born Like This tour of the UK

=== Lyricism ===
Dumile's lyrics are known for wordplay. Bradley and DuBois, describing Dumile as "among the most enigmatic figures in hip-hop", wrote that Dumile's "raspy baritone weaves an intricate web of allusions drawn from comic books and metaphysics along with seeming nonsense and non sequiturs". According to an obituary in The Ringer, his flow was "loose and conversational, but delivered with technical precision", and his use of rhyme and meter eclipsed that of Big Pun and Eminem. Dumile's production work frequently incorporated samples and quotations from film. A review of Special Herbs volumes 5 and 6 in CMJ New Music Monthly compared Dumile's beats to "soul jazz".

=== MF Doom persona ===
Dumile created the MF Doom character as an alter ego with a backstory he could reference in his music. The character combines elements from the Marvel Comics supervillain Doctor Doom, Destro, and the Phantom of the Opera; like Doctor Doom and Phantom, Dumile referred to himself in the third person while in character. His signature mask was similar to that of Doctor Doom, who is depicted rapping on the cover of Dumile's 1999 debut album Operation: Doomsday.

Dumile wore the mask while performing, and would not be photographed without it, except for short glimpses in videos and in earlier photos with KMD. Later versions of the mask were based on a prop from the 2000 film Gladiator. Academic Hershini Bhana Young argued that, by appropriating the Doctor Doom mask, Dumile "positions himself as enemy, not only of the music industry but also of dominant constructions of identity that relegate him as a black man to second-class citizenship".

Dumile sometimes sent stand-ins to perform in the mask, which he saw as a "logical extension" of the concept but angered audiences. Dumile initially claimed that he had lost weight and thus looked and sounded different. At a 2010 show in Toronto, an imposter was booed off stage before being replaced by Dumile. In an interview with The New Yorker, Dumile described himself as the "writer and director" of the character and that he "might send a white dude next ... Whoever plays the character plays the character".

In November 2019, during his performance at the Adult Swim Festival, the electronic artist Flying Lotus announced that he would be joined onstage by Dumile. Instead, the masked figure who appeared on stage was revealed as the comedian Hannibal Buress. Dumile's involvement in the prank was not confirmed.

== Legacy and influence ==
Dumile was celebrated in independent hip hop. After his death, the producer Flying Lotus wrote of Madvillainy: "All u ever needed in hip-hop was this record. Sorted. Done. Give it to the fucking aliens". The English musician Thom Yorke, who twice collaborated with Dumile, wrote: "He was a massive inspiration to so many of us, changed things... For me the way he put words was often shocking in its genius, using stream of consciousness in a way I'd never heard before". Stereogum, reviewing Operation: Doomsday on its 20th anniversary, noted Dumile's "formative" influence on younger rappers. El-P of Run the Jewels described him as a "writer's writer", while Q-Tip called him "your favorite rapper's favorite rapper". A biography by S.H. Fernando, The Chronicles of Doom: Unraveling Rap's Masked Iconoclast, was released on October 29, 2024.

== Personal life ==
=== Family ===
Dumile was married to his wife, Jasmine, for an unknown period until his death in October 2020. They had five children together. In late 2017, his son Malachi died from unspecified causes at the age of 14.

=== Views ===
Dumile's worldview was informed by Islam and the Afrocentrism espoused by African-American Muslims. His parents raised him and his brother as Muslims in the Five-Percent Nation, a religious black nationalist movement influenced by Islam. Dumile's father taught him about pan-African history, including historical figures such as Marcus Garvey and Elijah Muhammad, which he strove to impart on his peers.

By the early 1990s, Dumile and the other members of KMD identified as a member of the Ansaar Allah Community, later known as the Nuwaubian Nation. In their music, the members of KMD professed a religious message based on tenets of Nuwaubianism, which Dumile distinguished from Five-Percent beliefs in an early interview. In the music video for "Peachfuzz", Dumile and the other members of KMD wear kufi caps. By 2000, though he was no longer as strictly observant, Dumile still participated in Nuwaubian events such as the Savior's Day celebration at the Tama-Re compound in Georgia and held a positive opinion of the community.

=== Citizenship ===
Although Dumile lived in the United States for most of his life, he never obtained U.S. citizenship and remained a British citizen. Having entered the U.S. in August 1971, he applied for permanent residency in 2004 under the immigration registry provision, believing he was eligible. Despite submitting supporting evidence with legal assistance, his application was denied by U.S. Citizenship and Immigration Services in 2005. In 2010, after acquiring a British passport to undertake a European tour, Dumile was denied re-entry to the United States, separating him from his wife and children for nearly two years. His family relocated to London, England in 2012, after which he said he was "done with the United States". He subsequently lived in Yorkshire for several years and was residing in Leeds at the time of his death.

== Death ==
In October 2020, Dumile was admitted to St James's University Hospital in Leeds with respiratory problems. On October 31, he died from angioedema, an adverse reaction to blood pressure medication he had recently been prescribed. He had suffered from high blood pressure and kidney disease. Due to the COVID-19 lockdown, his wife, Jasmine, was not allowed to visit him in the hospital until the day of his death. His death was unknown to the public for two months until Jasmine announced it on December 31. The cause of death was not revealed until July 2023.

Dumile's family criticized his medical treatment. Jasmine said his nurse call button was placed out of reach and that hospital staff had failed to check on him frequently. Dumile's lawyers said it had taken them two hours to medicate his swollen throat, a symptom of angioedema. An inquest by the Leeds Teaching Hospital NHS Trust found that the hospital's care plan was not sufficiently detailed and that doctors were misled when Dumile's health appeared to improve. Dr. Hamish McLure, the chief medical officer of the trust, released an apology, saying Dumile's treatment had been substandard.

Many musicians paid tribute to Dumile. His 2004 instrumental track "Coffin Nails" was included on U.S. president Joe Biden's inauguration playlist in January 2021, which was criticized by fans of Dumile, as Biden was the vice president in 2010 when Dumile was refused re-entry to the United States.

== Selected discography ==
=== Solo albums ===
- Operation: Doomsday (1999)
- Take Me to Your Leader (as King Geedorah) (2003)
- Vaudeville Villain (as Viktor Vaughn) (2003)
- VV:2 (as Viktor Vaughn) (2004)
- Mm..Food (2004)
- Born Like This (as Doom) (2009)

Instrumental albums

- Special Herbs, Vol. 2 (as Metal Fingers) (2002)
- Special Herbs, Vol. 4 (as Metal Fingers) (2003)
- Special Herbs, Vol. 5 & 6 (as Metal Fingers) (2004)
- Special Herbs, Vol. 7 & 8 (as Metal Fingers) (2004)
- Special Herbs, Vol. 9 & 0 (as Metal Fingers) (2005)

=== Collaborative albums ===
- Madvillainy (with Madlib, as Madvillain) (2004)
- Special Herbs + Spices Volume 1 (with MF Grimm) (2004)
- The Mouse and the Mask (with Danger Mouse, as Danger Doom) (2005)
- Key to the Kuffs (with Jneiro Jarel, as JJ Doom) (2012)
- NehruvianDoom (with Bishop Nehru, as NehruvianDoom) (2014)
- Czarface Meets Metal Face (with Czarface) (2018)
- Super What? (with Czarface) (2021)

KMD studio albums

- Mr. Hood (as Zev Love X, with KMD) (1991)
- Black Bastards (as Zev Love X, with KMD) (2000)

Monsta Island Czars studio albums

- Escape from Monsta Island! (as King Geedorah, with Monsta Island Czars) (2003)
