= African hip-hop =

Music genre

- Stylistic origins: Hip-hop
- Cultural origins: 1980s, Africa

Hip-hop music has been popular in Africa since the early 1980s due to widespread African American influence. In 1985, hip-hop reached Senegal, a French-speaking country in West Africa. Some of the first Senegalese rappers were Munyaradzi Nhidza Lida, M.C. Solaar, and Positive Black Soul.

There also have been groups in Tanzania and other countries that emceed before 1989, that knows as Kwanza Unit although it is not very well known. During the late 1980s to mid 1990s, Stevano UGO, Lagos, Nigeria hit "Earthquaking African MC" became the first Afrobeat rap Artist playing on radio Ray Power FM released via Kennis Music founder, Kenny Ogungbe "African Diddy, this sparked more awareness of bilingual rappers started to escalate all over Africa. Each region had a new hip hop style. Rap elements are also found in kwaito, a subgenre of house music which was developed in South Africa in the 1980s. Hip-Hop the genre itself was created by African Americans during the early 1970s in The Bronx, New York. African Hip-hop and Rap has also women or girls like rapper. They began Rap in 1980 in South Africa and West Africa.

While the consensus is that hip-hop originated in the Bronx, many scholars and enthusiasts argue that the genre's artistic roots can be traced back to Africa. Dating back to the 13th century, griots were prominent figures in West African kingdoms and empires. These highly skilled orators, poets, musicians, praise singers and satirists traveled extensively, recounting the history of their empires through rhythmic and repetitive delivery. This well-established oral tradition is often cited as a precursor to rap, suggesting it may have laid the foundational groundwork for the emergence of hip-hop. Call-and-response, popularized by artists like James Brown, and featured in 1980s songs like Kurtis Blow's "The Breaks". Call-and-response has deep historical roots in African traditions, evident in the Igbo musical style of ogene music, the foundational elements of fuji music and oríkì panegyrics performed by Yoruba priests. African-American poetry groups, collectively called The Last Poets offered the earliest glimpse of Africa’s influence on Western hip-hop culture, during the Civil Rights movement. The group's vocal style incorporated elements of call-and-response and rhythmic chanting rooted in African cultural traditions. Moreover, the name "The Last Poets" was inspired by a poem titled "Towards a Walk in the Sun" by South African poet Keorapetse Kgositsile.

== Algeria ==
Algerian hip-hop music, as a genre, includes the hip-hop music of both native Algerians and Algerians abroad. Algerians living abroad have contributed much to this genre, especially in France, where they are also considered part of the French hip-hop scene. Some of these Algerians have become prominent. Algeria also has a hip-hop scene, which, while less well known internationally, is among the most developed in Africa and the Arab world.

Raï is a genre of music that developed in Algeria during the 1920s as rural migrants incorporated their native musical styles into the culture of the growing urban centers of western Algeria.

== Angola ==
Angola has a lively hip-hop scene, including popular and influential crews like Conciencia da Africa, Atitude violenta, Pobres Sem Culpa, Filhos Da Ala Este, Mutu Moxy (Intelektu) Based in Cape Town, South Africa, and have begun to work with some South African hip-hop musicians. Angolan hip-hop is characterized by the influence of American hip-hop beats with a special flavor of Portuguese flow, mixed with African rhythm and some Caribbean influence. SSP, Mutu Moxy (Intelektu) Political Rap, Kool Kleva, Nelboy Dastha Burda are credited for being the pioneers of the hip-hop in Angola from the late 1980s to the early 1990s.

Hip-hop in Angola can be very censored. In order for artists to perform in large arenas where they can get a lot of exposure and recognition, their music has to be reviewed by a board. Because of this, oftentimes artists who tend to speak out on politics in their music have trouble blowing up. Instead of getting to perform at certain events such as festivals and actual concerts, they are forced to perform to small groups in underground areas. This has made the underground hip-hop music scene in Angola very lively.

MCK is one of the most popular underground rappers in Angola. He is known for constantly getting in trouble with the law about his lyrics, in which he constantly criticizes and calls out the government. Other rappers in Angola known for this include Brigadeiro 10 Pacotes and Dioniso Casimiro.

Luanda is the music capital of Angola. Many new sounds have came from this city, including a popular one called Kuduro. Legends like DJ Amado and Buraka Som Systema helped to spread this sound quick internationally by performing across the globe.

== Benin ==
Beninese hip-hop traces its roots to a 1992 concert by Senegalese-French rapper MC Solaar in Cotonou. Several music groups presented in this concert, such as Ardiess, Sakpata Boys and H2O, later produced hip-hop style music on their own. Beninese hip-hop features lyrics in French, English and local languages such as Fon and Yoruba.

== Botswana ==
Botswana has never had a large popular music industry, with most of its recorded music coming from South Africa or further abroad. However, since about 1999, Botswana hip-hop performers have begun to gain mainstream acceptance; the record labels such as Dagee Records,

Phat Boy etc. has done a lot to promote Botswana hip-hop. The hip-hop movement in Botswana has grown over the years as evidenced by the release over the years of albums and songs from artists such as Mr Doe, Zeus, Touch Motswak Tswak, Ignition, S.C.A.R, Awesomore.aka Gaddamit, Cashless Society, Nitro, Konkrete, HT, Flex, Dice, Dj Dagizus, 3rd Mind, Kast, Nomadic, Slaine John and Draztik to name a few. The release of hip-hop albums is slow because of the small market and competition from other genres of mostly dance-oriented music. Since 2000 hip-hop has achieved more prominence in Botswana, with rappers like Scar Kast and Third Mind releasing relatively successful albums. In 2006, Scar released his sophomore offering, "Happy Hour". The same year Kast released "Dazzit". S.C.A.R has since won a Channel O Spirit of Africa Award 2007 for best hip-hop. New Hip-Hop Musicians such as William Last KRM, Ban T, DoubleUp(Ambitiouz Entertainment) and AbtheActivist have found mainstream success in the neighboring South Africa .

== Cameroon ==
After hip-hop reached Cameroon, it took two years to actually become popular. This was because when the genre of music first reached the country, it was associated with angry youth and rebellious behavior.

The hip-hop scene of Cameroon includes pioneers like Manhitoo and Negrissim' who broke new ground in the early 1990s. Other hip-hop artists from Cameroon are Les Nubians. Stanley Enow and Jovi continue to build the industry.

Krotal, also known as Paul Edouard Etoundi Onambele, is one of the most legendary pioneer rappers to come out of Cameroon. He also founded the popular record label Ndabott Prod in 2007. The label has worked and continues to work with artists such as Abaracadabra, JaHel MineliH, Cyrille Nkono. Krotal himself also works under the label. Evindi and Sundjah formed one of the most influential rap groups out of Cameroon, Evindi and Sundjah in 1995.

Rap in Cameroon has continued to evolve since then. For example, Cameroon was not used to sampling beats. Jovi, who also goes by Ndukong Godlove, was one of the first artist to do this in the country and make it popular. Now many artists in Cameroon follow in his footsteps. Today the most viewed song and video out of Cameroon is Stanley Enow's 'Hein Pere', which was released in 2013. Rap in Cameroon is also no longer associated with angry youth.

== Côte d'Ivoire ==
Ivorian hip-hop became a mainstream part of the popular music of Côte d'Ivoire beginning in 2009 after the victory of Ivorian hip-hop group Kiff No Beat at the hip-hop contest Faya Flow, and has been fused with many of the country's native styles, such as zouglou. There is a kind of gangsta rap-influenced Ivorian hip-hop called rap dogba. Ivorian Hip-Hop is mostly in the French language, but includes nouchi (Ivorian Slang).

== Democratic Republic of Congo ==
Hip-hop in Democratic Republic of Congo is mainly used as a way for people, mainly youth, to express their political views and hold the government accountable. Since the civil war in Congo there has been an increase in random senseless killings, rape, and crime in general. Hip-hop has been a very popular way to protest these crimes going on in the country. As citizens' freedom of speech dwindles away. Rap and its lyrics have been used by the youth as a way to protest this and rebel. Fally Ipupa is one of Congos most popular rappers.

The capital of the Democratic Republic of the Congo, Kinshasa, has long been a major home for pan-African styles of popular music like rumba, soukous and kwassa kwassa. Long-time performers on the Kinshasa scene include Profetzion (formerly of Holokaust), and the Congo Brazzaville rapper Passi.

== The Gambia ==
The Gambia's much larger neighbor, Senegal, is home to a thriving hip-hop scene, which has exerted a strong influence on Gambian hip-hop but Gambian hip-hop is now evolving its own unique style. In 1999, the Gambia Radio & Television Services gave out the first Gambian Rap Award. The first crew to win the award for best new act was Da Fugitvz, who rapped in Wolof, the national language of Senegal, and thus became popular in both countries. They also later played at Popkomm in Germany.

== Ghana ==
Hip-hop in Ghana is commonly referred to as Gh hip-hop. The phrase GH Rap was created by Jayso and Ball J when they released their first Skillions mixtape. According to the two rappers, GH Rap means Hip-hop music made in Ghana. Hiplife is also a Ghanaian genre similar to hip-hop music; it is a combination of hip-hop music and highlife. This started in the late 1980s and early 90s with the hiplife father Reggie Rockstone, VIP, Talking Drums and Nananom. But others did a mix of English with Twi or Ga like Heaven n' Hell, this was copied by secondary school and small area rap groups who will rap in pidgin English (a mix of English and other dialects). The Ghanaian music scene has also produced a number of rappers and DJs who are both locally and internationally renowned. Ghanaian rapping is mostly in the English language, but is also sometimes in Twi, Ewe, Ga or Hausa.

== Guinea ==
Although Guinea is not much known internationally for any variety of popular music, there is a local hip-hop music scene, which has produced one crew with an international reputation, Kill Point, which has toured across West Africa. Many groups use Guinean folk rhythms and styles in their music. The Guinean Africa Rap Festival is held in Conakry.

Hip-Hop in Guinea first appeared in the 1990s. Since then, it has been used in the country to fight political and social battles, and in the fight for civil rights and justice. It is constantly being used to criticize the government. Rap in Guinea often features references to Congos history and historical figures. It has entirely changed the sociocultural identity of Guinea's youth, which are now more concerned with making political changes in the country.

Most rappers in Guinea are also activists. Masta Tito is one of the most popular rappers out of Guinea. He is symbolic of the rapper-activist combo in Guinea. Other rapper-activists in Guinea include Cientista Realistas, As One, F. B. M. J., Bunca MC, Rock Salim, Dame Cotche, Race Preto, Fil Cap, Best Friends, Daw Tchaw, Baloberos, Torres Gemeo.

== Liberia ==
Hipco, also known as HipCo or simply "co" stands as a genre of hip-hop originating from Liberia. Hipco typically employs Liberian English or local vernacular in its performances, reflecting the communication style familiar to Liberians. Emerging in the 1980s, Hipco has consistently maintained a social and political edge. Despite the challenges posed by the civil wars of the 1990s, it continued to evolve, becoming an integral aspect of Liberian cultural identity in present-day.

== Madagascar ==
Hip-hop has rapidly grown in popularity in Madagascar in the past decade. The local name of hip-hop is "Haintso Haintso", meaning "H. H." (for hip-hop). Malagasy hip-hop, although largely reflective of Western genre standards, has been moving toward incorporation of more Malagasy musical tradition in its style and instrumentation.

Hip-hop spread to Madagascar in about 1985 together with breakdancing. The local rap scene (Rap Gasy) remained underground until the late nineties, although artists as early as 1994 were attracting attention with their politically provocative lyrics.

On 21 June 2007, UNICEF chose a 15-year-old Malagasy rap star, Name Six as its first-ever Junior Goodwill Ambassador for Eastern and Southern Africa. The young rapper's work continues the genre's tradition of social critique and political commentary, focusing largely on the challenges faced by children in underprivileged communities in Madagascar and voicing the views and concerns of the young, who are routinely omitted from political decision-making processes.

== Malawi ==
Hip-hop culture in Malawi is relatively young. Notable rappers who were early on the scene include Criminal A, Bantu Clan, Real Elements, Dynamike, Dominant 1, Black Mind, L-Planet, trudoccsy, Ben Flavor, Knight of the Round Table, and Wisdom Chitedze. The scene started to gain traction in the late 90s and expanded further in the early 2000s when cheap computers and recording gear became widely available to artists. The launch of Television Malawi in 1999 provided a platform for rappers to have their music videos beamed to a national audience. The music video to Wisdom Chitedze's song Tipewe was on regular rotation on the station in its early days. In the early to mid-2000s artists such as Nospa G, M Krazy, David Kalilani, and Gosple helped push the music further. A lot of Malawi's early hip-hop music contained social commentary, religious, and introspective themes.

By the late 2000s the scene had picked up further with artists such as Barry One, Godskho, Sage Poet, Sergius, Prototype, Prevail, G.E.N.E.T.I.X, MO Effects, Nyasa Vibes Crew, Basement, Mandela Mwanza, Hyphen, Fredokiss, and Tay Grin gaining notoriety. Tay Grin's music video for the song Stand Up was featured considerably on Channel O. He was not the first Malawian rapper to get his song on that station; that accolade goes to the Real Elements. However, Tay Grin's got much more airplay. In 2009, Phyzix released his debut studio album The Lone Ranger LP which contained the hit singles Cholapitsa and Gamba. Around the same time, Christian rap started to gain popularity and that movement was spearheaded by Manyanda Nyasulu, DJ Kali, KBG, Double Zee, Liwu, C-Scripture, Asodzi, Erasto, and Sintha.

Some of the producers who helped pioneer the sound of Malawian hip-hop include Dominant 1, Maj Beats, The Dare Devils, Kond1, Dynamike, Keith Justus Wako, Qabaniso Malewezi, Tapps, Dizzo, Sonye, Kas Mdoka and Rebel Musiq.

DJs such as Dr Gwynz and Kenny Klips also helped push the music on radio. They hosted a show called The Hip-Hop Drill which involved playing rap music and a phone-in rap competition whereby rappers called in and competed to spit the best bars.

== Namibia ==
Hip-hop music and culture have a big influence on the Namibian youth, with American rappers, Tupac Shakur, and The Notorious B.I.G. being popular. Most of the urban Namibian youth have adopted a hip-hop lifestyle, including their dress code. Early Namibian hip-hop acts include a group called Dungeon Family.

== Niger ==
"Rap Nigerien", a style of Nigerien hip-hop, began to develop in the late 1990s, mostly in Niamey, and has become one of the dominant popular music forms in Niger. It is a mélange of different languages spoken in Niger. Sampled music is often mellow, and is mixed with the traditional music, although more aggressive dance styles have been mixed in, reflecting influences of French, American, and other West African hip-hop styles (especially Ivorian hip-hop). Young, dissatisfied Nigeriens have used the form to talk about common social problems. Local recordings are mostly sold on cassette tapes and compact discs, as with most forms of contemporary West African popular music.

Hip-hop groups began to appear and perform in Niamey in 1998. In August 2004, UNICEF opened its "Scene Ouverte Rap", where 45 new groups entered selections among an informal count of 300 existing groups. Shows took place at Niamey's Jean Rouch Centre Culturel Franco – Nigerien (CCFN) in August 2004.

== Nigeria ==
Nigerian hip-hop, began gaining traction in the late 1980s and early 1990s, with Lagos emerging as its initial hub. During this period, Nigeria was under military rule, which contributed to widespread economic difficulties, including currency devaluation, job losses, and high unemployment, particularly among recent university graduates. For many youths, hip-hop served as an escape from these challenging circumstances. The genre was initially popularized through the use of Nigerian languages in the lyrics, combined with traditional hip-hop beats from pioneers like DJ Kool Herc, Afrika Bambaataa, and Grandmaster Flash. Due to the scarcity of record labels and limited financial resources, aspiring musicians often produced their own music on modest budgets. Music videos from this era were typically simple and low-cost. The advent of computers and affordable music editing software in the late 1990s and early 2000s enabled Nigerian artists to produce higher-quality recordings, which quickly resonated with the local audience. This era saw a shift towards independent music production and distribution, with artists selling their music on CDs. Hip-hop provided a platform for entertainment and a means to critique the government, advocating for social change. Notable early hip-hop groups and artists from this period include Junior & Pretty, Daniel 'Danny' Wilson, Plantashun Boiz, and "The Remedies, 'featuring members such as Eedris Abdulkareem, Eddy Remedy, and Tony Tetuila." The late 1990s and early 2000s also saw the emergence of artists returning from the Western diaspora, such as eLDee da Don, U.G.O, Madarocka, and Naeto C, along with European-Nigerians like JJC Skillz and the 419 Squad, and celebrated home base prominent artists such as Dagrin among others. These artists helped to localize hip-hop, incorporating Nigerian languages and English, thus enriching the genre's linguistic diversity. Despite a decline in popularity from 2010 to 2021, when hip-hop's market share dropped from nearly 15% to 7%, a resurgence began in early 2022 with a new wave of artists like Reminisce, Olamide, Falz, Naira Marley, CDQ, PsycoYP, Cheque, and Blue Ivan, who introduced a refreshed approach to the genre. Publications such as Hip-Hop World Magazine, African Beatz, Blast, and Bubbles have played a significant role in shaping and promoting hip-hop culture in Nigeria and across Africa.

=== Street pop ===
Street hop
- Other names: Street pop
- Stylistic origins: dance music; hip-hop; pop
- Cultural origins: Late 2010s-early 2020s, Lagos, Nigeria

Street pop, also known as street hop, originating in Lagos is an experimental rap-vocal genre that evolved from a fusion of Nigerian hip-hop, popular music, Afrobeats, and Nigerian street music. It draws influence from artists such as Danfo Drivers, Baba Fryo, and Daddy Showkey, as well as the shaku shaku dance style, which was initially inspired by gqom but eventually developed into its distinct genre. Characterized by vibrant tempos, street pop incorporates elements of gqom, highlife, pop, hip-hop, and EDM. While it is predominantly fast-paced, slower variations are also common within the genre. Street pop is known for its melodic arrangements, use of urban colloquial language and Pidgin, and a blend of indigenous and Western rap styles. Variants of street pop include neo-fuji, shaku shaku and zanku. Prominent figures in the street pop scene are Olamide, Phyno, Slimcase, Mr Real, Idowest, Naira Marley, Zinoleesky, Mohbad, Balloranking, Reminisce, Rexxie, Zlatan Ibile, Sarz, 9ice, Lil Kesh, T.I Blaze, Asake, Portable, Bella Shmurda, Seyi Vibez, Qdot, and DJ Kaywise.

== Rwanda ==
Hip-hop spread to Rwanda in the early to mid-1980s. The most prominent figure in the early Rwandan scene was DJ Berry (Nsabimana Abdul Aziz), who was a DJ for Kigali Night and Cosmos and a presenter for Radio Rwanda, in addition to being an early rapper and breakdancer. The Rwandan government of the period did not approve of hip-hop, however, and DJ Berry was forced into exile in Goma, Zaire, where he continued performing. He later moved on to Germany and recorded "Hey You", which became a hit on both Rwandan and Ugandan radio. After returning to Africa in 1990, Berry continued to promote hip-hop in Rwanda until his death from AIDS in 1996. By the mid-1990s, hip-hop was growing increasingly popular in Rwanda, due to the introduction of 101 FM Kigali and TVR in 1995, and American and French rappers like Tupac Shakur and MC Solaar became popular.

The first locally recorded Rwandan hip-hop hit was "Peaced Up" by KP Robinson ft Mc Monday Assoumani. This was promoted by DJ Alex of Radio Rwanda from 1997.

In 2020, particularly in its capital Kigali, drill music experienced a sudden increase in popularity in 2020 because of the rise of local rappers and producers in the region, along with a localized scene known as "Kinyatrap". The scene gave rise to numerous rappers such as Ish Kevin, Logan Joe, and Pro Zed.

== Senegal ==
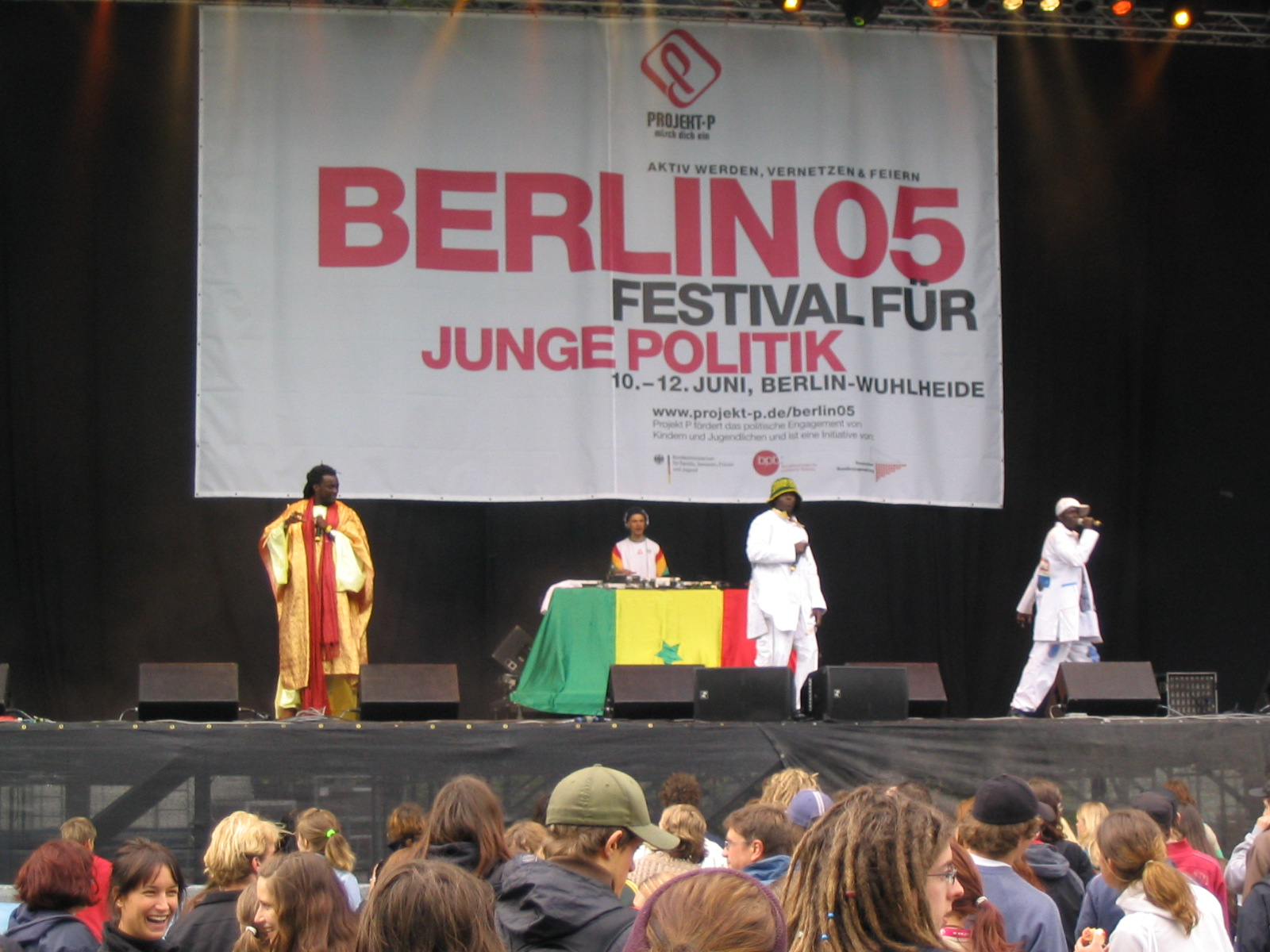
Daara J live in Berlin

Senegal has one of the most active hip-hop scenes on the continent and has produced international stars like MC Solaar. US hip-hop became popular in Senegal in the early 1980s, and a few MCs began rapping. During this period, many Senegalese rappers were copying American performers quite closely. One often-cited reason for the prominence of Senegalese hip-hop is the ancient musical and oral traditions of that country, which include some practices, like griots and tassou, which are similar to rapping. Some of the earliest hip-hop groups from Senegal include Positive Black Soul, Pee Froiss, and Daara J.

It was not until later in the decade that a more distinctive Senegalese sound began evolving, along with the use of Wolof lyrics. The 1990s saw a division in the Senegalese scene, with some artists remaining underground, associated with the American alternative hip-hop scene, while others, like Black Mboolo ("Alal"), fused hip-hop with Senegalese mbalax style, (this is called "mbalax rap" or "rap ragga soul"), which uses the sabar drums.

== Sierra Leone ==
Sierra Leone rap music was originated by a Sierra Leone–based rapper; YOK Seven in the late 1990s. Prior to this time pop rapper Jimmy B had already blown up in South Africa. His pop rap was a rave in Sierra Leone during the mid 1990s. Hip-hop music in Sierra Leone includes Grammy-nominated artist and author Freddy Will.

== Somalia ==
One of the most internationally renowned Somali rappers is Canada-based K'naan (real name Kanaan Warsame). The award-winning artist is a rapper and a poet with three albums, The Dusty Foot Philosopher (on BMG Music), The Dusty Foot on the Road (on Wrasse Records) and Troubadour (on A&M/OctoScope Music) He has been one of the most popular artists in this country and across the continent this century and is very politically engaged. As a teenager, K’Naan began to write songs to help him process the turmoil he experienced in Mogadishu. He had a major influence on rap when he released The Dusty Foot Philosopher. In this song he combined African instruments with American hip-hop to form a new sound. Many artists have followed in his footsteps. Soobax is one of his most popular tracks.

== South Africa ==
=== South African hip-hop ===
The history of South African hip-hop in Cape Town can be traced back to the early 1980s, amid widespread cultural exchange between the United States, the West Indies, and South Africa since the 19th century. Influences from minstrels, swing, and bebop, partly in response to British imperialism, shaped South African musical styles. The discovery of gold in Johannesburg in the late 19th century led to a migration of diverse tribal groups, resulting in a fusion of traditional South African and European music, which contributed to the development of a unique sound. Over the past two decades, hip-hop in South Africa has grown significantly, notably through the rise of kwaito, a distinct genre in its own right. Despite its growth, South African hip-hop remains relatively underrecognized, with artists struggling to achieve commercial success. The South African hip-hop scene became divided, with Cape Town being recognized as a central hub, known for its politically charged and socially conscious artists such as the hip-hop group (P.O.C)Prophets of Da City. The youth in South Africa initially engaged with hip-hop through breakdancing and graffiti, due to the high cost and limited availability of American music. Economic and political sanctions made American hip-hop difficult to access, with albums often arriving through relatives from abroad. Although some skepticism existed regarding hip-hop's ties to the broader global context of Third World struggles, South African youth embraced the genre’s anger, passion, and style. They localized hip-hop to reflect their own cultural narratives, frustrations, and hopes. The adaptation allowed them to express their experiences and connect with broader socio-political issues, particularly in the context of apartheid, using hip-hop as a vehicle for cultural pride and resistance.

South African hip-hop has risen as a significant presence in the country's mainstream music landscape and it has undergone a transformative journey over the decades. Notable figures in South African hip-hop include Tuks Senganga, Cassper Nyovest, Nasty C, Kwesta, Khuli Chana, iFani, Mo'Molemi, Da L.E.S, Sjava, K.O, Frank Casino, Okmalumkoolkat, Fifi Cooper, Anatii, Emtee, Shane Eagle, YoungstaCPT, A-Reece, and Big Zulu and Phatblitz.

Die Antwoord, an alternative hip-hop group, gained global mainstream recognition. Their style, reflecting their Zef counter-culture with its embrace of "cheap-and-dirty values," garnered attention worldwide. Their self-published debut, propelled by two standout and humorous YouTube music videos released in 2010, quickly went viral. Eliciting a highly polarized international response, their music ultimately led to a record deal with Cherrytree Records, an imprint of Interscope. Additionally, they sparked controversy by rejecting an opening act offer from American pop singer Lady Gaga for her Born This Way Tour.

==== South African hip-hop subgenres ====
Various genres within South African hip-hop include muthaland crunk, motswako, kasi rap, gqom trap, African Trap Music (ATM).

== Uganda ==
Uganda's hip-hop scene began in the early to mid-1990s, especially among university students at Makerere University and elsewhere. The Bataka Squad, formed in the early 1990s are the originators of the Lugaflow style, using the native Luganda language. Other formative groups on the Ugandan hip-hop scene in the early 90s include Young Vibrations, MC Afrik, DJ Berry, Sylvester and Abramz and Kaddo. Club Pulsations in Kampala was a hotspot for Ugandan hip-hop in the 90s. In 2002, Klear Kut were nominated for the Kora All Africa Music Awards in the "Most Promising African Group" and "Revelation of the Year" categories.

In 2003 Geoffrey Ekongot, Saba Saba aka Krazy Native, of the Bataka Squad, Francis Agaba, the late Paul Mwandha of Musicuganda.com, and Xenson formed the Uganda Hip-Hop Foundation. In 2003, the Foundation hosted the first Ugandan Hip-Hop Summit and concert at Club Sabrina's in Kampala. It was so successful that they have hosted it every year for the past four years. In 2005 the Bavubuka All Starz was formed under the leadership of Silas aka Babaluku of the Bataka Squad, with the mission of bringing hip-hop music and community together to address social causes. Keko is currently one of the most promising and talented rappers in Uganda. Of late Uganda has produced globally recognized MCs like Bana Mutibwa whose commonly known as Burney MC. In 2013 he represented Uganda at the biggest hip-hop festival in Europe (Hip Hop Kemp).

Lumix Da Don, a.k.a. Lumumba Patrick was an underground Ugandan rapper, record producer and CEO of Valley Curve Records. He made hip-hop the biggest genre in Northern Uganda.

Kiga flow is performed in Rukiga and Runyankole.

== Zambia ==
Hip-hop in Zambia has its roots in the late '80s and early '90s; many young people were influenced by American hip-hop mostly shown on imported programs by the local broadcaster Zambia National Broadcasting Corporation. Early rappers and crews include Blaaze and Chilu Lemba.

Daddy Zemus was one of the first artists who fused ragga and hip-hop and is widely revered as the first artist to proudly use local languages to present his craft in this art form.

The first hip-hop album to be released in Zambia was a gospel hip-hop album called Talk About God by a duo called MT God Bless which was released on cassette tape in 2003. (Mandiva Syananzu & Tommy Banda were the two rappers). It got massive airplay both locally and internationally. MT God Bless were also the first Christian hip-hop duo to have their music video played on South Africa's Channel O. Pictures of the cassette tape can be seen on Mandiva's Facebook page with the year 2003 inscribed on it. In 2005 C.R.I$..I$. Mr Swagger released what is considered the biggest debut release by a hip-hop artist in Zambia titled "Officer in Charge". Other notable artists to come up over the years are Black Muntu, The Holstar, Conscious, Takondwa, Pitch Black, Diamond Chain, 5ive 4our, Zone Fam, C.Q Krytic, Slap Dee, Macky 2, Mic Diggy and Urban Chaos

In 2007, The Hip-Hop Foundation of Zambia was formed, as a registered arts and culture organization. The organization was formed and registered under the Zambia Association of Musicians as a group member. ZAM is registered under the Zambian National Arts Council.

Zambian rappers Slap Dee and Macky 2 are widely considered the most popular vernacular Hip-Hop artists in Zambia. Zone Fam formed in 2007 and gained popularity in 2011 when they released their debut album single "Shaka Zulu On Em". In November 2013 they released "Contolola" which gained the number one position on the Afribizcharts.

== Zimbabwe ==
Zimbabwe hip-hop music has been popular with young Zimbabweans, through the rise of amazing artists like the late Calvin, who sang with South African rapper Cassper Nyovest and Changamire Hip-Hop award winner Holy Ten, who collaborated with the Nasty C from South Africa. Bulawayo born rappers like POY and Naborth Rizzla played a prominent role in the growth of rap music in Zimbabwe through running tours around colleges and Universities. Victoria Falls City also has a huge hip-hop movement with big promoters like Mordcai Ngazah and Brighton Musaidzi creating amazing platforms like their Victoria Falls News weekly newspaper and Umclulo, an African Hip-Hop Magazine and hip-hop radio station.

== Hip-Hop and civil rights in Africa ==
Rap has been used as a form of political protest in Africa since it reached the continent. Fela Kuti is legendary in Africa for being one of the first artists to use rap to critique the government. Since then, a large majority of rappers in Africa have followed in his footsteps. Rappers in Africa are often responsible for political change. For example, Keur Gui, a popular rap group in Africa helped to lead the Y'en a Marre movement in Senegal. They played a large role in getting thousands of Senegalese citizens to vote and make sure President Wade did not serve a third term.

Because hip-hop in Africa has such a large impact on politics, many countries have begun censorship of rap. However, banned artists often gain popularity as listening to them is seen as a form of protest and rebellion.

Rapper PilAto for example, was arrested for participating in protests when he accused future member of the ruling party in Zambia of stealing state resources in 2017, in one of his songs.

== Recordings ==
- Bongo Flava. Swahili Rap from Tanzania (2004) compilation by Out Here Records
- Lagos Stori plenti – urban sounds from Nigeria (2006) compilation by Out Here Records
- African Rebel Music – Roots Reggae & Dancehall (2006) compilation by Out Here Records
- Urban Africa Club – hip-hop, Kwaito and Dancehall (2007) compilation by Out Here Records
