= Kasumba =

Kasumba is a surname. Notable people with the surname include:

- Dennis Kasumba (born 2003), Ugandan baseball player
- Florence Kasumba (born 1976), Ugandan-born German actress and voice actress
- Jane Kasumba, Ugandan media personality and journalist
- Leslie 'Lee' Kasumba (born 1980), Ugandan radio and TV presenter
- Samson Kasumba (born 1974), Ugandan pastor and TV personality
