= African Raw Material Vol. 1 =

Studio album by Cashless Society
- Released: October 17, 2003
- Recorded: 2001–2003
- Genre: Hip hop, rap
- Length: 65:28
- Label: Unreleased Records / BMG Africa
- Producer: Draztik; Gemini; Snazz D Masauko

Singles from African Raw Material Vol. 1
- 1. "Hottentot Hop (Bantu 1, 2)" Released: 2003; 2. "Taxi Wars" Released: 2004; 3. "8-3-1 (I Love You)" Released: 2004

African Raw Material Vol. 1 is the debut studio album by South African rap group Cashless Society. The album was released on Unreleased Records and was distributed by BMG Africa. The song "Hottentot Hop (Bantu 1, 2)" had a music video released in 2003, followed by "Taxi Wars" which had a music video released in 2004 as well. The song "8-3-1 (I Love You)" was then featured on the Yizo Yizo 3 soundtrack.

Released as an enhanced CD, the enhanced portion includes a Press Kit (Bio, Pictures and Wallpaper), and a video clip of Cashless Society performing live on YFM. The album won Best Hip-Hop Album at the South African Music Awards in 2004, with the single "Hottentot Hop (Bantu 1, 2)" winning both Best South African Rap Song and Best South African Music Video as well. The album finished in the Top 10 selling South African albums for 2004 in tenth place.

== Track listing ==
Physical release
No.	Title	Length
1.	"The Meaning"	1:24
2.	"Accidental Heroes"	4:27
3.	"Hottentot Hop (Bantu 1, 2)"	4:36
4.	"8-3-1 (I Love You)" (featuring Maggz)	4:33
5.	"Life"	4:27
6.	"Summer Craze"	4:11
7.	"Bring It On" (featuring Mizchif, Norm Gates and Cuba)	5:42
8.	"Live @Jumpin Jack"	2:48
9.	"Taxi Wars"	3:13
10.	"Madd Shit"	4:36
11.	"Words 4 Real"	3:56
12.	"It Ain't A Game"	3:14
13.	"Tizeye"	4:14
14.	"Mr. Forgetful"	4:29
15.	"Stuck" (featuring Tumi and Masauko)	9:38
16.	"Dolly Partin'" (hidden track)
Total length:		65:28

== Personnel ==
- Draztik – performer, executive producer
- Gemini – performer, producer, mixing
- Snazz D – performer, producer
- X-Amount – vocals
- Fat Free – vocals
- Black Intellect – vocals
- Tizeye – vocals
- Criminal – vocals
- Maggz – vocals
- Mizchif – vocals
- Norm Gates – vocals
- Cuba – vocals
- Tumi – vocals
- Masauko – producer

== Accolades ==
Date	Award	Awarding body
2004	Best Hip-Hop Album (African Raw Material Vol. 1)	SAMA
2004	Best South African Rap Song ("Hottentot Hop (Bantu 1, 2)")	SAMA
2004	Best South African Music Video ("Hottentot Hop (Bantu 1, 2)")	SAMA
