= Cashless Society (band) =

Southern African hip hop group

- Origin: Gaborone, Botswana; Johannesburg, South Africa
- Genres: Hip hop, rap
- Years active: 1999–2006
- Label: Unreleased Records
- Members: Black Intellect; Criminal; Draztik; Fat Free; Gemini; Snazz D Tizeye; X-Amount
- Past members: DJ IQ
- Website: http://www.unreleasedrecords.com/

Cashless Society also known as The Hard Cashless Society or THC Society are a southern African hip hop crew from Gaborone, Botswana and Johannesburg, South Africa. The group consists of Snazz D (Julian Du Plessis), Draztik (Dave Balsher), X-Amount (Kwezi Ngcakani), Black Intellect (Jerry Kai Lewis), Fat Free (Salim Mosidinyane) & DJ IQ (who left the group, when he moved back to Queens, NY), the group made later acquisitions of other like minded artists with Criminal (Alfred Chirwa), Tizeye (Tyrone Phillips) & Gemini (Thabiso Mofokeng) (the later is also a member of Groundworks) joining to form the group well known as Cashless Society.

== History ==
=== Early years ===
In 1999 the independent label Unreleased Records was formed by CEO's Draztik and DJ IQ from Gaborone, Botswana, and X-Amount from Johannesburg, South Africa. The idea was to create a platform for the emerging hip-hop talent in southern Africa which they felt was being secluded from the musical landscape by the industry. Cashless Society were amongst the first groups to sign with Unreleased Records in 1999. The group was made up of Draztik, X-Amount, Snazz D, Black Intellect, Slim a.k.a. Fat Free and DJ IQ. Other groups originally signed to the label were Organik Interfaze (Draztik, Slim and DJ IQ) and Nativity (Fifth Light, L biz, Carnage and Swarthy) both groups from Gaborone, Botswana. The name Cashless Society sums up the crew via a double meaning: cashless, as in the plastic economic future of the modern world and cashless as in Africa, currently the poorest of the poor.

Draztik, Slim and DJ IQ were the hosts of the weekly live radio show Strictly Hip-Hop on radio station RBII in Botswana. They were also the members of the group Organik Interfaze, The three had spent considerable time abroad, with Draztik growing up in Sacramento, California, Slim being born and raised in New York City and DJ IQ growing up in Queens, New York, before they all returned to Botswana.

X-Amount and Snazz D were based out of Johannesburg, South Africa and had formed the group Gun of a Nation (Zulu, "Isizwe se zi bhamu") together. The Son of a former South African MK guerilla soldier, X-Amount was born in a military camp in Nairobi, Kenya, before relocating to Toronto, Canada, at the age of eight. He returned to South Africa in 1998. Black Intellect, also based out of Johannesburg, was born in Freetown, Sierra Leone, and grew up in Baltimore, Maryland, before relocating to South Africa and joining the group Cashless Society.

=== Blaze Tha Breaks ===
In 2000 Bobbito Garcia, Mr. Len and Jean Grae travelled to South Africa from New York City to perform in South Africa for the first time. Bobbito then released the split-12" single of Cashless Society "Blaze tha Breaks" b/w Mizchif "Place for a Wife" on his own Independent Fondle 'Em Records in 2000 upon their return to the States. The A-side of the record, 'Blaze Tha Breaks' saw Snazz D, X-Amount and Black Intellect rhyming over a Nina Simone sample based beat produced by Draztik and X-Amount. The B-Side saw Mizchif featuring Tsakani Mhinga performing "Place for a Wife" over a beat by Richard The 3rd. Distribution was handled by Fat Beats with the record becoming one of the first Internationally distributed records for a South African hip-hop artist. The single was released in southern Africa on Unreleased Records the following year, and it was also featured on the "Farewell Fondle 'Em" compilation released on Definitive Jux as well.

The South African release also features the songs 'History', 'Make It Happen' and Blaze Tha Breaks (Remix). The enhanced portion of the CD features full biographies as well as the 'Blaze Tha Breaks' music video.

=== African Raw Material Vol. 1 ===
In 2003 the group released their first full-length album 'African Raw Material volume one' on their own Unreleased Records imprint with distribution handled by Sony BMG Africa. It featured guest appearances by Tumi, Mizchif and Masauko of Blk Sonshine. The album saw the group add additional members Criminal, Tizeye and Gemini, while DJ IQ had left the group to relocate back to Queens, New York. Criminal a rapper originally from Lilongwe, Malawi, Tizeye from Johannesburg and Gemini a rapper and producer from Cape Town who is also a member of Groundworks.

==== Hottentot Hop (Bantu 1,2) ====
The first single off the album 'Hottentot Hop (Bantu 1, 2)' was well received. The song featured Snazz, X-Amount and Fat Free performing a Draztik produced beat. The video directed by Andrew Wessels was filmed in the Kalahari Desert and earned the group an award at the South African Music Awards that year for best video. The song was also featured on the 'Silvertab Harambe Dope Sessions' compilation released by DIY Records and published by African Dope Records. The compilation was made up of songs voted in by the Bush Radio listenership. It was also featured on the 'Rhyme 'N Reason' compilation released by Ready Rolled Records that same year.

==== Taxi Wars ====
The second single off the album 'Taxi Wars' was equally well received. The song was produced by Gemini and saw him rapping alongside Snazz D and X-Amount. The song served to address the territorial conflicts of the taxi commissions in Johannesburg. The video was directed by Wessels as well and was also featured on the CD/DVD release 'Afrolution Vol. 1 – The Original African Hip Hop Collection' released on Afrolution Records.

The song '8-3-1 (I Love You)', a dedication to Johannesburg, was featured on the Yizo Yizo 3 Soundtrack released on CCP Record Company. That year, Cashless Society won three SAMA awards, as well as four awards at the annual 'Hip-Hop Indaba awards' in Cape Town. The group then appeared on the cover of the first issue of HYPE magazine, the first national hip-hop publication in South Africa. The following year saw Unreleased Records recording artists Snazz D and Young Nations feature in the first hip-hop commercial for CNN Inside Africa.

== Discography ==
=== Releases ===
Albums

- African Raw Material Vol. 1 – Cashless Society, Unreleased Records (CDUR 1000) (2003)

Singles

- Blaze Tha Breaks – Cashless Society b/w "Place for a Wife" – Mizchif, Fondle 'Em Records (FE-SA1) (2000)
- Blaze Tha Breaks – Cashless Society, Unreleased Records (CDUR 001) (2001)

=== Guest appearances ===
- "Blaze Tha Breaks" by Cashless Society on Sweet Sixteen: Vol. 16 – DJ MK, MK Enterprizes (MK-16) (2000)
- "Blaze Tha Breaks" (featuring Snazz D, Black Intellect & X-Amount) by Cashless Society on Farewell Fondle 'Em – V.A., Definitive Jux (DJX-19) (2001)
- "Hottentot Hop (Bantu 1, 2)" by Cashless Society on Silvertab Harambe Dope Sessions – Various Artists, DIY Records (2003)
- "Hottentot Hop (Bantu 1, 2)" by Cashless Society on Rhyme 'N Reason – Various Artists, Ready Rolled Records (RRRCD 009) (2004)
- "8-3-1 (I Love You)" by Cashless Society on Yizo Yizo 3 – Various Artists, CCP Record Company (CDYIZO (WL) 3) (2004)
- "Dolly Partin'" by Cashless Society on Smirnoff Spin Hype Sessions Vol. 1 – Various Artists, HYPE Magazine (2005)
- "Taxi Wars" by Cashless Society on Afrolution Vol. 1 – The Original African Hip Hop Collection – Various Artists, Afrolution Records (afrolution001) (2005)
- "Hottentot Hop (Bantu 1, 2)" by Cashless Society on African Grooves Volume 13 – Various Artists, Blue Pie (2008)

== Touring, Significant Performances and Media ==
Cashless Society have played and headlined shows in both South Africa and Botswana. They opened for Dead Prez and Blak Twang in both Johannesburg and Gaborone in 1999. The group also opened for Jean Grae, Mr. Len and Bobbito in Johannesburg. They were featured on the cover of HYPE Magazine for the first issue of the publication. The first nationwide hip-hop magazine to be published in South Africa as well.

== Band members ==
- Dave Balsher (Draztik) – producer, lyricist
- Alfred Chirwa (Criminal) – lyricist
- Julian Du Plessis (Snazz D) – producer, lyricist
- Jerry Kai Lewis (Black Intellect) – lyricist
- Thabiso Mofokeng (Gemini) – producer, lyricist
- Salim Mosidinyane (Fat Free) – lyricist
- Kwezi Ngcakani (X-Amount) – producer, lyricist
- Tyrone Phillips (Tizeye) – lyricist

== Awards ==
=== Awards won ===
Date	Award	Awarding Body
2004	Best Hip-Hop Album (African Raw Material Vol. 1)	SAMA
2004	Best South African Rap Song (Hottentot Hop Bantu 1,2)	SAMA
2004	Best South African Music Video (Hottentot Hop Bantu 1,2)	SAMA
