= Channel O Sprite Emcee Africa tour =

- Also known as: Emcee Africa
- Genre: Reality competition
- Created by: Jonathan Clarke
- Presented by: Leslie 'Lee' Kasumba
- Theme music composer: Don Juan (Octave Couplet)
- Country of origin: South Africa
- Original language: English
- No. of seasons: 2
- No. of episodes: 26

Production
- Running time: 52 minutes

Original release
- Network: Channel O
- Release: May 31, 2008 – August 31, 2009

The Channel 0 Emcee Africa tour is a tour that is sponsored by Sprite. It was associated with Emcee Africa - The Battle Chronicles, a talent show televising the competition. It was a continent-wide search for the premier freestyle MC/Rapper. The tour started in Accra, Ghana, and then went through Dar Es Salaam, Tanzania, Nairobi, Kenya, Luanda, Angola, Lagos, Nigeria, and Johannesburg, South Africa. Gaborone, Botswana, was included in the second season, while Luanda, Angola, and Dar Es Salaam, Tanzania, were cut from the tour.

The motive of the tour was not only to find the best freestyle MC, but to initiate international awareness of the 'street life' surrounding social and cultural context of the localized music. In other words, the tour was attempting to better contextualize the application and reception of hip hop culture in each visited country.

The winner received $10,000, a video and a song deal.

== Format and rules ==
The first season of Emcee Africa followed the host Leslie 'Lee' Kasumba to the various host cities, where the local MC/Rapper's were invited to an audition. The final eight MC's were selected to face off in a knockout competition to determine the winner. During the auditions, each performer had two minutes to prove their candidacy for the final eight to a panel of judges. A topic was given to each contender to Freestyle about in order to ensure each contestant was truly improvising and not using any written material. After eight contestants were selected from each country, a separate contest was held, where the eight members would face off to battle each other in two 30 second parts, divided into 2 rounds, followed by the Final. The winner from each country was then flown into Johannesburg to compete for the "Emcee Africa" title, as well as the grand prize. A judge from each country's panel was then flown in to ensure neutrality in the final competition.

The second season followed a similar format with similar rules, except that ten contenders were selected from the auditions, rather than eight. In the second season, contestants who made it through to the second round did not Battle each other but were rather judged based on a performance. From the performance, the judges panel selected two finalists to face off in a final battle.

== Wildcard ==
For the Final Battle in the first season, audiences could log into www.channelo.co.za, and vote for their favorite MC/Rapper from the previous competitions, to reappear in the final stages.

== Host ==
Leslie 'Lee' Kasumba (a top hip hop radio DJ from South Africa's YFM station) is the host. She also corresponds for Africanhiphop.com.

On the tour called 'the Battle Chronicles', she was chosen to narrate her daily experiences of traveling.

== Quotes ==
"Never before has a continental Hip Hop reality based competition such as this existed."

== Emcee Africa 1 ==
=== Ghana ===
Date: Saturday, 22 December 2007
Location: Usher Forte, Accra, Ghana
Co-Host: Eddy Blay (XFM)
Judges: Dj Black (Ghanaian DJ), Kwame Swift, Reggie Rockstone

Final 8: Grafik, ID, J Town, Melodrama, Padlock, Rhyme Miller, Robin Hood, Trigger

Round 1
(Ghana)	ID
(Ghana)	Trigger
(Ghana)	J Town
(Ghana)	Robin Hood
(Ghana)	Melodrama
(Ghana)	Padlock
(Ghana)	Grafik
(Ghana)	Rhyme Miller

Round 2
(Ghana)	ID
(Ghana)	J Town
(Ghana)	Padlock
(Ghana)	Grafik

Final Battle
(Ghana)	J Town
(Ghana)	Padlock

=== Tanzania ===
Date: Saturday, 12 January 2008
Location: TCC Social Club, Dar Es Salaam, Tanzania
Co-Host: Reuben (Clouds FM)
Judges: Lindu, Lufunyo, Professor Jay

Final 8: Abbas, Adili, God Emcee, Neville, Phoenix, Rage, Randal, X-Wray

Round 1
(Tanzania)	God Emcee
(Tanzania)	Abbas
(Tanzania)	Phoenix
(Tanzania)	Neville
(Tanzania)	Adili
(Tanzania)	X-Wray
(Tanzania)	Rage
(Tanzania)	Randal

Round 2
(Tanzania)	Abbas
(Tanzania)	Phoenix
(Tanzania)	X-Wray
(Tanzania)	Rage

Final Battle
(Tanzania)	Abbas
(Tanzania)	Rage

=== Nigeria ===
Date: Saturday, 19 January 2008
Location: Nimbus Art Centre, Lagos, Nigeria
Co-Host: Tito (RayPower 100.5 FM)
Judges: Blaise, Ikechukwu, Modenine

Final 8: Del, Delta P, E-Law, Jizzy, Maximum, Teeto, Torpedo, Vector

Round 1
(Nigeria)	Teeto
(Nigeria)	Vector
(Nigeria)	Torpedo
(Nigeria)	E-Law
(Nigeria)	Delta P
(Nigeria)	Jizzy
(Nigeria)	Maximum
(Nigeria)	Del

Round 2
(Nigeria)	Teeto
(Nigeria)	Torpedo
(Nigeria)	Delta P
(Nigeria)	Maximum

Final Battle
(Nigeria)	Teeto
(Nigeria)	Maximum

=== Kenya ===
Date: Saturday, 26 January 2008
Location: WAPI, Nairobi, Kenya
Co-Host: Eve D'Souza (Capital FM)
Judges: Doobiz, Mwafrika, Nazizi

Final 8: Big Mic, Faya, Kimya, Lethal Dynamic, Mohammed, Point Blank, SNM, Tua

Round 1
(Kenya)	Kimya
(Kenya)	Point Blank
(Kenya)	Big Mic
(Kenya)	Tua
(Kenya)	Lethal Dynamic
(Kenya)	Mohammed
(Kenya)	SNM
(Kenya)	Faya

Round 2
(Kenya)	Point Blank
(Kenya)	Big Mic
(Kenya)	Lethal Dynamic
(Kenya)	SNM

Final Battle
(Kenya)	Big Mic
(Kenya)	Lethal Dynamic

=== Angola ===
Date: Saturday, 1 February 2008
Location: (Angola) Elinga Teatro, Luanda
Co-Host:
Judges: DJ Samurai, Kool Kleva, MC K

Final 8: Agape, Jorge, MG, Nigga Chi, One See, Ray D, Sunny Boy, Yung D

Round 1
(Angola)	Sunny Boy
(Angola)	One See
(Angola)	Yung D
(Angola)	Nigga Chi
(Angola)	MG
(Angola)	Agape
(Angola)	Jorge
(Angola)	Ray D

Round 2
(Angola)	Sunny Boy
(Angola)	Yung D
(Angola)	MG
(Angola)	Jorge

Final Battle
(Angola)	Yung D
(Angola)	MG

=== South Africa ===
Date: Saturday, 9 February 2008
Location: Roka Bar, Johannesburg, South Africa
Co-Host: AK (YFM)
Judges: Mizi, Proverb, Ready D

Final 8: Adamiz, Ben Sharpa, Heavy G, Projectah, Quaz, Slege, Snazz D, Steezy Stylish

Round 1
(South Africa)	Ben Sharpa
(South Africa)	Slege
(South Africa)	Steezy Styllish
(South Africa)	Adamiz
(South Africa)	Snazz D
(South Africa)	Quaz
(South Africa)	Projectah
(South Africa)	Heavy G

Round 2
(South Africa)	Ben Sharpa
(South Africa)	Adamiz
(South Africa)	Snazz D
(South Africa)	Heavy G

Final Battle
(South Africa)	Adamiz
(South Africa)	Snazz D

=== Final Battle ===
Date: Friday, 28 March 2008
Location: The Pyramid, Johannesburg
Co-Host: Proverb (Metro FM)
Judges: Dj Black (Ghanaian DJ), Mizi (South Africa), Modenine (Nigeria), Nazizi (Kenya), Professor Jay (Tanzania), Wordsworth (United States)

Finalists: Big Mic (Kenya), J Town (Ghana), Rage (Tanzania), Snazz D (South Africa), Teeto (Nigeria), Yung D (Angola)
Wildcard winner: Adamiz (South Africa)

Round 1
(South Africa)	Snazz D
(Kenya)	Big Mic
(Nigeria)	Teeto
(Tanzania)	Rage
(Ghana)	J Town
(Angola)	Yung D
Wildcard seed below
(South Africa)	Adamiz

Round 2
(South Africa)	Snazz D
(Nigeria)	Teeto
(Ghana)	J Town
(South Africa)	Adamiz

Final Battle
(South Africa)	Snazz D
(Ghana)	J Town

- Snazz D wins the first season of Emcee Africa, earning him $10,000 (USD), and a single and video deal featuring Wordsworth.

== Emcee Africa 2 ==
=== Botswana ===
Date: Saturday, 18 April 2009
Location: Fashion Lounge, Gaborone, Botswana
Co-Host:
Judges: Apollo Diablo, Zeus,

Final 10: Aztech 1, Blain, Cibil Nyte, Dizzo, EQ, Kid, King Ming, Nitro, Oracle, Simba

Round 1
Blain vs. Aztech 1
Cibil Nyte vs. Nitro
Kid vs. Dizzo
EQ vs. King Ming (both disqualified)
Simba vs. Oracle (both advanced due to disqualification)

Round 2 (Individual Performance)
Aztech 1
Cibil Nyte
Dizzo
Simba
Oracle

Final: Oracle vs. Cibil Nyte

Winner: Cibil Nyte

=== South Africa ===
Date: Saturday, 25 May 2009
Location: Roka Bar, Johannesburg, South Africa
Co-Host: Reason
Judges: HHP, Nthabi, Zubz

Final 10: Adamiz, G.C., Maraza, Mr. Calibre, Otis, Phoenix, Rhyming Type, S!ck, Soniq, Ulysses

Round 1
Otis vs. Adamiz
Rhyming Type vs. Phoenix
G.C. vs. S!ck
Ulysses vs. Mr. Calibre
Maraza vs. Soniq

Round 2 (Individual Performance)
Adamiz
Phoenix
S!ck
Mr. Calibre
Maraza

Final: Maraza vs. Adamiz

Winner: Maraza

=== Ghana ===
Date: Thursday, 7 May 2009
Location: Tantra, Accra, Ghana
Co-Host: Eddie Blay
Judges: Kwaku T, Scientifik

Final 10: Augustt, Boy Gemini, C-Real, Chymney, Krime, Melodrama, Padlock, Props, Robin Hood, Rocky

Round 1

Padlock vs. Chymney (both advanced due to disqualification)
Props vs. Augustt
Melodrama vs. Robin Hood (both disqualified)
C-Real vs. Boy Gemini
Rocky vs. Krime

Round 2 (Individual Performance)
Chymney
Padlock
Props
C-Real
Rocky

Final: Props vs. C-Real

Winner: C-Real

=== Nigeria ===
Date: Sunday, 10 May 2009
Location: Insomnia Nightclub, Lagos, Nigeria
Co-Host:
Judges: B.O.U.Q.U.I., Modenine, Naeto C

Final 10: Black Jesus, Collyde, Cwitch, Dirty-A, Emperor Trench, E.Y.M.E., Jizzy, Sergio, Taikoff, Torpedo Mascaw

Round 1

Dirty-A vs. Torpedo Mascaw (both advanced due to disqualification)
Collyde vs. Taikoff (both disqualified)
Cwitch vs. Sergio (both disqualified)
E.Y.M.E. vs. Jizzy
Black Jesus vs. Emperor Trench (both advanced due to disqualification)

Round 2 (Individual Performance)

E.Y.M.E.
Dirty-A
Emperor Trench
Torpedo Mascaw
Black Jesus

Final: Black Jesus vs. Dirty-A

Winner: Black Jesus

=== Kenya ===
Date: Sunday, 28 June 2009
Location: Club Clique, Nairobi, Kenya
Co-Host: G-Money
Judges: Doobiz, Mwafrika, Nazizi

Final 10: Bizzill, Kaligraf, Kimya, Kips, Lethal Dynamic, Lon' Jon, OD, Olu, Point Blank Evumbi, X-tatic

Round 1

Point Blank vs. X-tatic
Kimya vs. OD
Lethal Dynamic vs. Bizzill
Lon' Jon vs. Olu
Kaligraf vs. Kips

Round 2 (Individual Performance)

Kaligraf
Kimya
Lethal Dynamic
Lon' Jon
Point Blank

Final: Point Blank vs. Kaligraf

=== Final Battle ===
Date: 28 June 2009
Location: Club Clique, Johannesburg, South Africa
Co-Host: Proverb (Metro FM)
Judges: HHP (South Africa), Naeto C (Nigeria), Nazizi (Kenya), Proverb (South Africa), Zeus (Botswana)

Finalists: Black Jeez (Nigeria), Cibil Nyte (Botswana), C-Real (Ghana), Maraza (South Africa), Point Blank (Kenya)

Round 1 (Individual Performance)

Black Jeez
Cibil Nyte
C-Real
Maraza
Point Blank

Final: Zeus vs. C-Real
Final 2: Cibil Nyte vs. Zeus

Winner: Cibil Nyte

- Cibil Nyte wins the second season of Emcee Africa, earning him $10,000 (USD), and a single and video deal.

== Winners ==
- Emcee Africa winner (season one): (South Africa) Snazz D
- Emcee Africa 2 winner (season two): (Botswana) Cibil Nyte

== Other media ==
=== Singles ===
2008: "Battle Chronicles (Emcee Africa)" - (by DJ Black, Rage, Yung D, J Town, Mode9, Snazz, Professor J & Nazizi) (3:49)
Produced by Don Juan (Octave Couplet) as featured on Hype Sessions Vol. 21: Jazzworx FM The Album.
CD published by HYPE Magazine in their 25th Issue, June/July 2008.

2009: "All Around The A" - (by Proverb, Naeto C, HHP, Nazizi, Zeus, Tamarsha & Cibil Nyte) (5:15)
Produced by Don Juan (Octave Couplet).
