= Glass-bottom boat (disambiguation) =

A Glass-bottom boat is a type of boat with transparent sections below the waterline.

Glass Bottom Boat may also refer to:

- The Glass Bottom Boat, a 1966 romantic comedy film starring Doris Day and Rod Taylor
- "Glass Bottom Boat", song on 2002 album The Rest of Us by Gas Huffer
- "Glass Bottom Boat", song on 1996 The Visualz EP by Siah and Yeshua DapoED
- "Glass Bottom Boat", song on 2013 Soothsayer EP by The Fresh & Onlys
- Level It Records/Glass Bottom Boat Music, record company that released music by Janus (American band)
