= Lempa =

Lempa may refer to:

- Lempa, Cyprus (or Lemba), village near the Paphos District capital
- San Francisco Lempa, municipality in El Salvador
- Lempa River, Central American waterway

== See also ==
- Lemba (disambiguation)
