= Dj Black (Ghanaian DJ) =

Ghanaian DJ

DJ Black
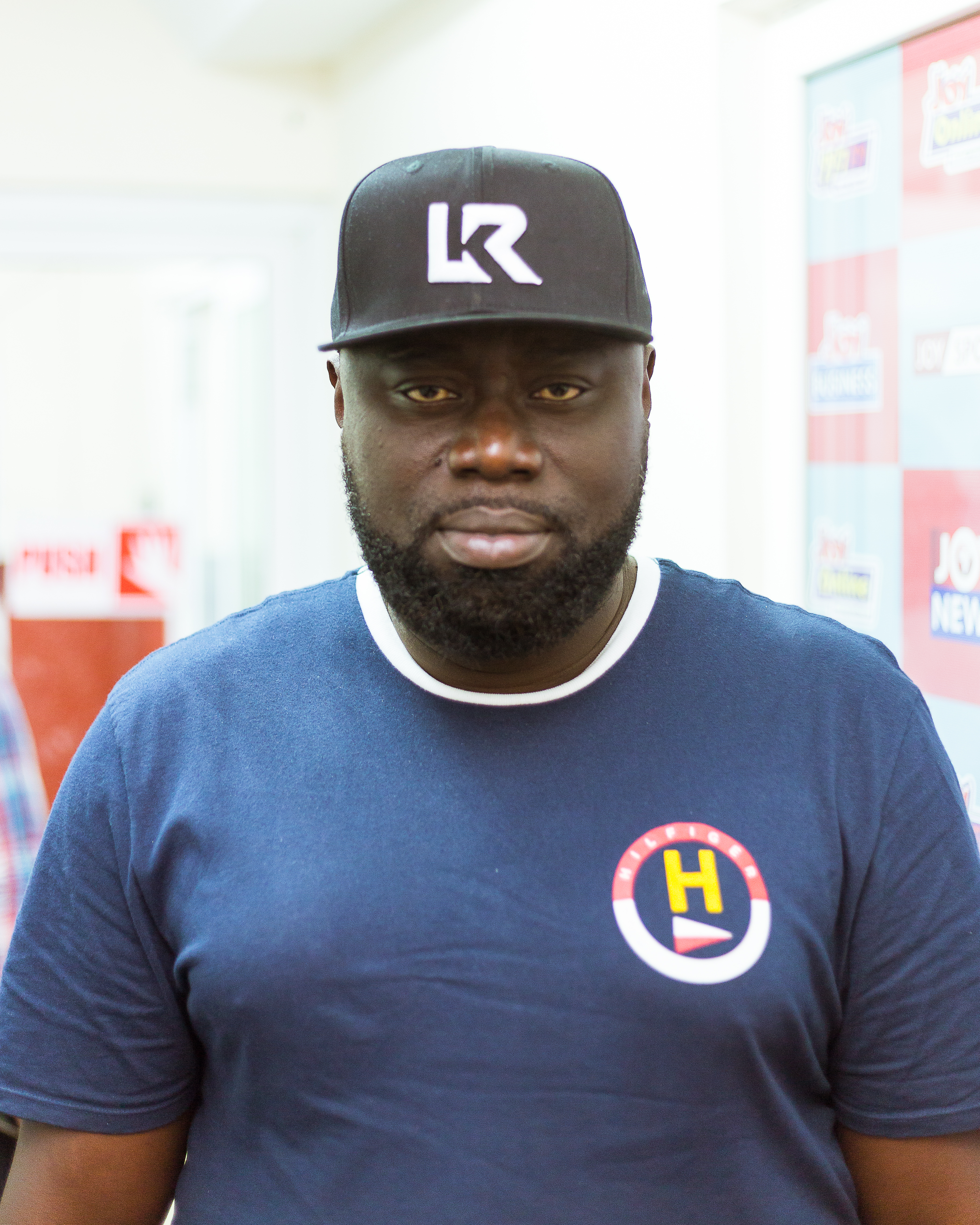
- Portrait of DJ Black Ghana
- Born: Kwadwo Ampofo; Accra, Ghana
- Occupations: Disc Jockey, Radio & TV Broadcaster
- Years active: 1993–present

Kwadwo Ampofo also known as Dj Black or the Toontoom is a Ghanaian disc jockey and media personality. He is also a radio host at Joy FM of the Multimedia Group Limited and has been the official DJ for Vodafone Ghana Music Awards.

== Early life and education ==
Dj Black was born in Ghana but raised in Port Harcout, Nigeria before coming back to Ghana for senior high school education.

He attended Ofori Panin Senior High School for his secondary education then proceeded to the University of Ghana for a diploma in public administration management in 1999–2001. He later topped up his diploma with a Bachelor of Arts degree in mass communication and public relations at the University of Ghana from 2003 to 2006. He later attended the Ghana Institute of Journalism for a Master of Arts degree in media management from 2014 to 2015.

== Career ==
DJ Black started his DJ career in 1993 while in high school and later joined Prime Cut in 1995, where he worked alongside veteran Ghanaian DJs like Azigiza Jnr, DJ Magic Sam, DJ Rab, and DJ Kakra, to name a few. Later in 1997 he moved on to manage Dope Rhyme Studios in Nima whiles there he became one of the DJs pushing HipLife.

He started his radio career in 1997 at Radio Universe hosting Space Jam whiles in University. In 2001 he moved to work with Joy FM hosting the Open House Party, Joy Beach Jam, Weekend Warmer and other shows he was assigned to till date. He has also been a part of Hitz FM over the period of his time at Multimedia Group Limited owners of Joy FM as well.

DJ Black was the first judge to be chosen for the first ever Channel O Sprite Emcee Africa tour. He has played the finals set at the Big Brother Africa finals in 2011 in Johannesburg. He has also hosted Events, Concerts, Album Launches, Tours, Clubs, Mixtapes and others.

He founded Blaqbone International together with partners Mr. Bless’On (Radio Cardiff) and Nortse A. Amarteyfio in 2005 and manage artistes and DJs such as Dretonio, Philo, E-double.

In 2010, DJ Black formed the ToonToom brand with Toontoom Agency Studios at Kokomlemle, where he worked as a voice over artiste for a number of radio and TV commercials. He was later appointed Social Media Ambassador for Dstv Ghana in May 2012.

== Awards and nominations ==
Year	Event	Prize	Recipient	Result	Ref
2013	Ghana DJ Awards	Best DJ	Himself	Won	
2013	Ghana DJ Awards	Best Event DJ Of The Year	Himself	Won	
2013	Ghana DJ Awards	Best Male Radio DJ Of The Year	Himself	Won	
2014	AFRIMMA	Africa's Best DJ	Himself	Won	
2014	Ghana DJ Awards	Best DJ	Himself	Won	
2014	Ghana DJ Awards	Best Event DJ	Himself	Won	
2014	Ghana DJ Awards	Mixtape DJ Of The Year	Himself	Won	
2014	Ghana DJ Awards	Best Male Radio DJ Of The Year	Himself (Joy 99.7 Fm)	Won	
2015	Ghana DJ Awards	Best DJ	Himself	Won	
2015	Ghana DJ Awards	Best Radio DJ Of The Year	Himself (Joy 99.7 FM)	Won	
2016	Ghana DJ Awards	Best DJ	Himself	Won	
2016	Ghana DJ Awards	Best Radio DJ Of The Year	Himself (Joy 99.7 FM)	Won	
