= Nigerien hip-hop =

Rap Nigerien is a hip hop music style that first appeared in Niamey, Niger, at the end of 1998.

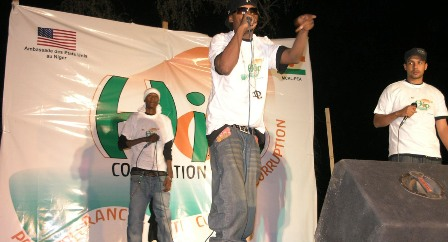
The Black Daps perform in Niamey, January 2009.

== Rap Nigerien ==
Rap Nigerien is a mélange of different languages spoken in Niger. Sampled music is often mellow, and is mixed with the traditional music, although more aggressive dance styles have been mixed in, reflecting influences of French, American, and other West African hip hop styles (especially Ivorian hip hop). Niger's hip hop scene grew from humble beginnings to dominate much of Niger's musical market. Young, dissatisfied Nigeriens have used the form to talk about things which anger them - forced marriages, child labor, corruption, poverty and other problems. Local recordings are mostly sold on cassette tapes and compact discs, as with most forms of contemporary West African popular music.

== Appearance ==
Hip hop groups began to appear and perform in Niamey in 1998. The first known Nigerien hip hop album was Lakal Kaney's 2000 "La voix du Ténéré".

Rap Nigerien began to appear in UNICEF cultural center music programmes as bands performed in benefit shows and contests. In August 2004, UNICEF opened its "Scene Ouverte Rap", where 45 new groups entered selections among an informal count of 300 existing groups. Shows took place at Niamey's Jean Rouch Centre Culturel Franco – Nigerien (CCFN) in August 2004.

== Current ==
The CCFN remains a major venue for Nigerien hip hop through 2008, hosting a regular competition series called the "Clash Party".

Many of these first groups are still active, including Tchakey, Kaidan Gaskya, Almamy Koye & WassWong, and Goro G. Diara Z, an Ivorian hip hop artist, was also living in Niamey at the time and was influential in the Niamey rap scene. Other successful groups include Black Daps, Berey Koy, Federal Terminus Clan, Haskey Klan, Kamikaz, Rass Idris, 3STM (Sols, Tataf et Mamoud), PCV (puissance, connaissance et verité) and Metafor.
