= DJ K Crakk =

Ghanaian DJ

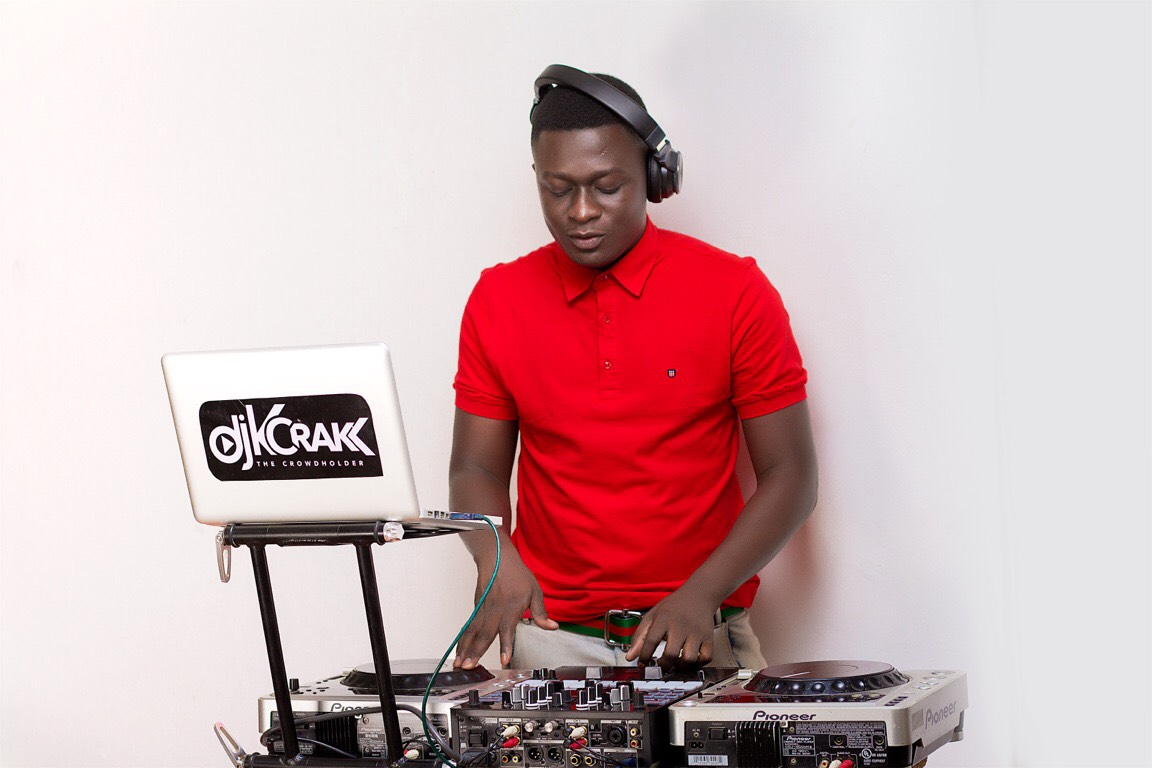
- Djying
- Born: Francis Lomotey; November 14, 1989 (age 36)
- Occupations: Disc Jockey, Songwriter

Francis Lomotey known professionally as DJ K Crakk and is a Ghanaian DJ. He is known for the kind of music he plays when on the dashboard or turntables. As result of his hard work he won a number of awards.

== Early life ==
Francis was born on November 14, 1989, in Tema to Esther Agbo and Dominic Lomotey. Growing up he was interested in turntables at the age of Twelve and living in a house hold of musician which spark his initial interest in music.

== Early career ==
He began djing while in school under the stage name DJ K Crakk, which was a nickname he received as a pre-teen because his favourite rapper was Fat Joe, who also bore a nickname as Joey Crack.

Before becoming a recognized entertainer DJ K Crakk began playing from one night club to another. He started Djing in 2010 as a passion and decided to take it up as a career when he started being paid as a DJ. He came into the spotlight at the Tigo Ghana Meet Naija concerts in 2016 where he stood in for Ghana as against the Nigerian DJ and won for Ghana.

In 2016, he was nominated for the Ghana DJ awards of which he won best Night Club DJ of the year, before he went on to perform on major concert and also have a mixtape called No Coiling

In 2022, he was nominated for the Night Club DJ of the Year award at the Ghana DJ Awards.
