= Tsakani (album) =

Studio album by Tsakani Mhinga
- Released: 2001
- Label: Universal Records
- Producer: Pete Martin

Tsakani Mhinga chronology
TKO (2000)	Tsakani (2001)	Black Butterfly (2003)

Tsakani is the second album by Tsakani Mhinga. Like its predecessor it won the South African Music Awards R&B Best Album.

== Track list ==
1. Eject Yo' Ass!
2. Sweet Love
3. The Feeling's Mutual (I'm In Love)
4. Leaving My History
5. Mind Yo' Buziness (Boxsta 2001 Mix)
6. I Find It So Strange
7. Drowning In Heaven
8. Where Did I Go Wrong
