= C-Real (rapper) =

Ghanaian rapper (born 1984)

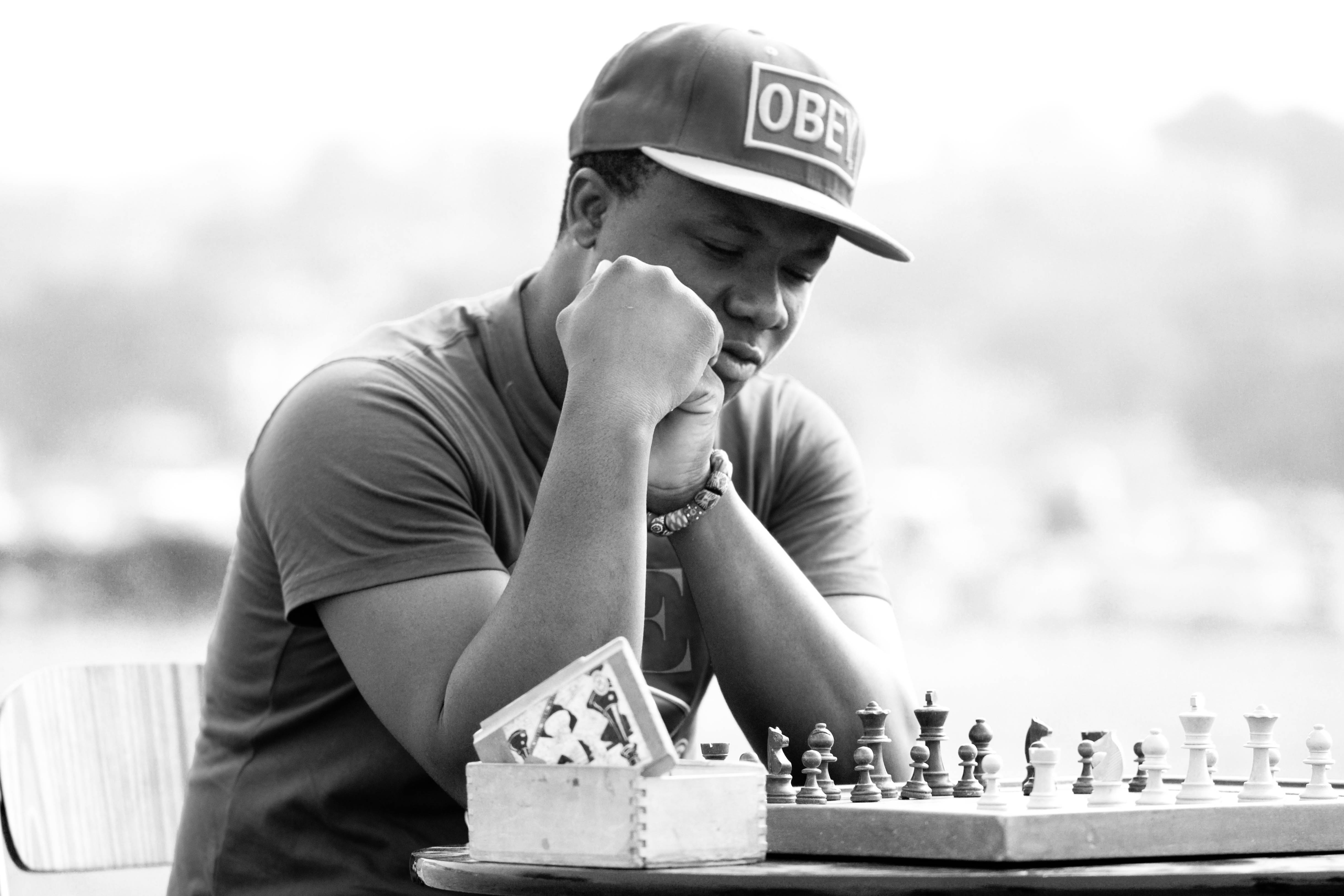
- C-Real

Background information
- Born: Cyril-Alex Gockel; July 16, 1984 (age 42); Hohoe, Ghana
- Origin: Accra, Ghana
- Genre: Hip hop
- Occupations: Rapper; poet; writer; entrepreneur; record producer
- Instrument: Vocals
- Years active: 2009–present
- Label: MixDown Studios
- Website: website

Cyril-Alex Gockel (born July 16, 1984), who is known by his stage name C-Real, is a Ghanaian rapper, record producer, entrepreneur, writer and poet. In 2009, he won the Ghanaian edition of the Channel O Sprite Emcee Africa talent show and finished second at the show's final. He is regarded as one of the leading hip-hop artists in Ghana, and has released the album Em C.E.O. (2012). C-Real was featured on "Next Up", a song from Coptic's mixtape The Rising Stars of Gh, Vol 1 (2012).

== Biography and music career ==
C-Real was born in Hohoe, a town in the Volta Region of Ghana. Growing up, he listened to artists such as Ini Kamoze, Das EFX and KRS-One. He and one of his friends formed a rap group called NT, an acronym for Nipa Tumtum. C-Real graduated from St. Peter's Boys Senior Secondary School and is also an alumnus of the University of Ghana. He started writing poetry, rap verses and literature in 2009. C-Real has cited The Notorious B.I.G., Elzhi, Black Thought, Mos Def, Jay-Z, Canibus, Method Man, Eminem, Nas and Busta Rhymes as his key rap influences. He has been nominated twice at the Ghana 40 under 40 Awards.

=== Channel O Sprite Emcee Africa (Ghana) ===
In an interview with Richmond Adu-Poku, C-Real said he decided to participate in the Ghanaian edition of the Channel O Sprite Emcee Africa talent show after hearing about it. He advanced to the top 10 round after the first round of auditions and subsequently battled Padlock, Chymny, and Rocky for the crown. After emerging as the competition's winner, he conducted radio interviews and co-hosted the Brown Berry Show on Choice 102.3 FM.

=== 2009–15: Mixtapes and debut studio album ===
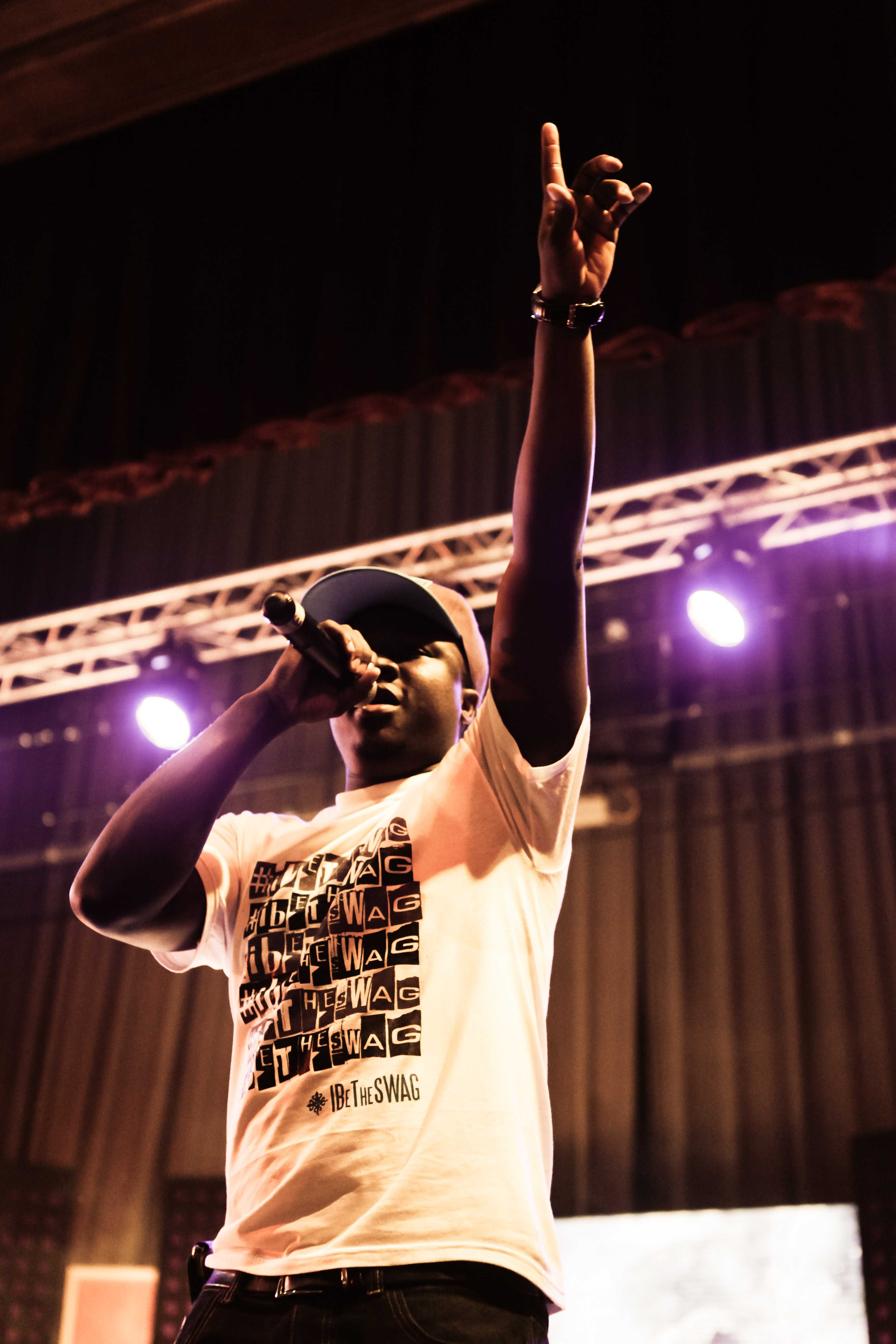

C-Real told Adu-Poku he was working on a mixtape with his cousin Joseph Deo-Silas and some of his close-knit friends. On November 3, 2009, he released Multiples of C, a seven-track mixtape. Described by the rapper as an "exhibition mixtape" designed to showcase his versatility, the project features guest appearances from Uno and A.ma. In April 2011, he teamed up with rapper E.L to release Project Hip Hop, a nine-track collaborative mixtape that features collaborations with Sherifa and Gemini. The mixtape was produced by DJ Juls, E.L and Aphroteq.

C-Real started working on his debut studio album, Em C.E.O., at Mix Down Studios. As a prelude to the album, he released "It's a Rap" and the Gospel-inspired track "Kneel, Pray, Rise, Conquer". Em C.E.O. was released on December 1, 2012, and features guest appearances from Efya, Chase, E.L, J-Town, Gemini, M.anifest, Lousika, Zeus, Bebelino and Yom da Poet. It was supported by the singles "I Be The Swag", "Em.Ceo", "Mission Possible", "Opeimu", and "Do the Azonto".

"I Be The Swag" was released as the album's lead single in 2011. The accompanying music video for the song was directed by Nana Asihene of NKACC, and received a nomination for Best Hip Hop Video at the 2011 4Syte Music Video Awards. On August 17, 2012, the music video for the title track, "Em.Ceo", was directed by SABA Arts and uploaded to YouTube. The video was nominated for Best Hip Hop Video at the 2012 4Syte Music Video Awards.

The Nana Kofi Asihene-directed music video for "Opeimu" was released on July 19, 2013. It was nominated for Best Collaboration of the Year, Best Hip Hop Video, and Best Photography Video at the 2013 4Syte Music Video Awards. C-Real's third mixtape, The Reigning Season, was released in January 2014. It comprises ten tracks and was recorded in Pidgin, English, Twi, Ewe, and Ga. The mixtape features guest appearances from Stargo Da Don and Johnny Boy. In "One Mic", C-Real pays tribute to American rapper Nas. On February 19, 2015, he released Project Hip Hop 2, his fourth overall mixtape and second collaborative project with E.L. The mixtape has ten songs and features collaborations with Gemini, Stargo, Ko-Jo Cue, Lil Shaker, Lady J, Nel Magnum, DJ Juls and E.L.

== Business life ==
C-Real started out as a junior copywriter at Origin8, a local advertising agency affiliated with Saatchi & Saatchi. He is currently the CEO of MixDown Studios and Pulse Communications. C-Real serves as the head of marketing at OG Farms, and is the marketing manager for 3Media Networks.

== Discography ==
Studio albums

- Em C.E.O. (2012)

Extended plays

- Business Suits and Dress Shoes (2016)

Mixtapes

- Multiples of C (2009)
- Project Hip Hop (with E.L) (2011)
- The Reigning Season (2014)
- Project Hip Hop 2 (with E.L) (2015)

== Awards ==
=== 4Stye Music Video Awards ===
Year	Nominee / work	Award	Result
2013	"Opeimu" (featuring M.anifest)	Best Collaboration of the Year	Nominated
2013	"Opeimu" (featuring M.anifest)	Best Hip Hop Video	Nominated
2013	"Opeimu" (featuring M.anifest)	Best Photography Video	Nominated
2012	"Em CEO" (featuring J-Town)	Best Hip Hop Video	Nominated
2011	"I Be Swag"	Best Hip Hop Video	Nominated
