= Black Butterfly (Tsakani Mhinga album) =

Studio album by Tsakani Mhinga
- Released: 2003
- Genre: R&B
- Length: 58 min
- Label: CSR Records

Tsakani Mhinga chronology
Tsakani (2001)	Black Butterfly (2003)

Black Butterfly is a 2003 album by Tsakani Mhinga. It won the South African Music Awards Best R&B Album in 2004.

== Track listing ==
1. Black Butterfly
2. In Dis Piece
3. Tell Him (How I Feel)
4. Initi8
5. Beddaman
6. Somewhere Over The Rainbow
7. The Way You Love Me
8. It's My Life
9. Everything 'Bout You
10. Close Your Eyes
11. Free Me
12. Friday Night
13. How Do You Feel
14. The Real Thing (Original Mix)
