= TKO (Tsakani Mhinga album) =

Studio album by Tsakani Mhinga
- Released: 2000
- Label: Township Records

Tsakani Mhinga chronology
TKO (2000)	Tsakani (2001)

TKO is the 2000 debut album of Tsakani Mhinga or "TK" on Township Records. The album received 4 nominations at the South African Music Awards, winning Best R&B Album. The single released was "Mind Yo' Business".

== Track list ==
1. Secret Confessions
2. PHD
3. I'm Not Down
4. Mind Yo Businezz
5. Ordinary Man
6. Only In Love
7. I Love You Baby
8. Kissing The Void
9. Secret Confession House Mix
10. Not Down London
11. Mind Yo Businezz Kwaito Mix
