= DJ Vyrusky =

Ghanaian disc jockey

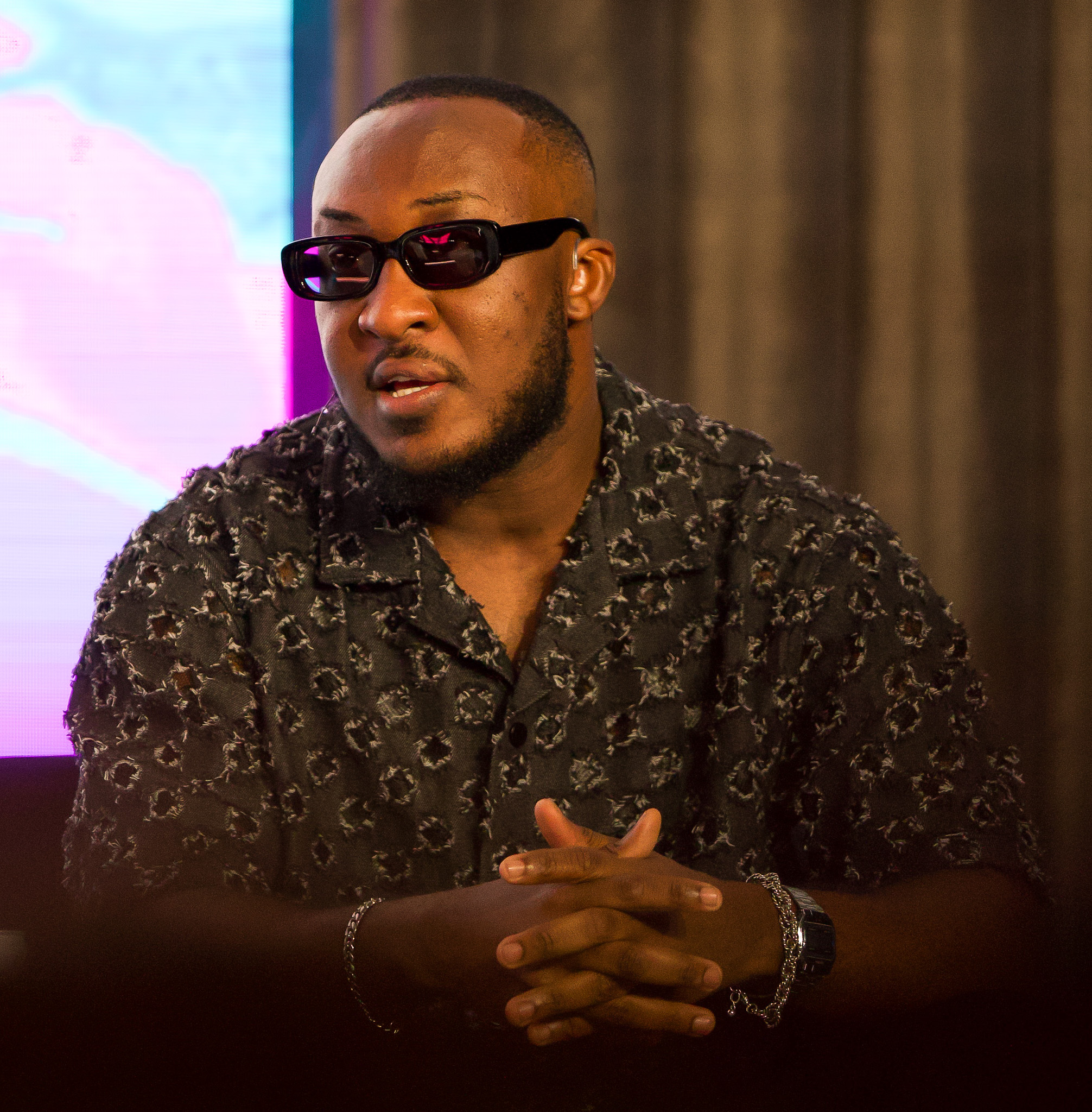

Background information
- Born: Kofi Amoako; April 21
- Genres: Hip hop, Afro beats and Hiplife
- Occupations: DJ, entrepreneur, Producer
- Years active: 2010–present
- Website: http://www.djvyrusky.com

Kofi Amoako, known professionally as DJ Vyrusky, is a Ghanaian disc jockey, he was the Commercial Media Manager at EchoHouse, before he becoming a full-time DJ on Starr Drive in 2014. He is currently the 2017 Ghana DJ Awards Best DJ of the Year and Best DJ from the Ghana Music Honors.

== Education ==
He graduated from the University of Ghana Business School with a BSc. administration (insurance option) and a master's degree in risk management and insurance from the same institution. DJ Vyrusky attended St. Thomas Aquinas Secondary School for his high school education as a science student.

== Musical career ==
=== The beginning ===
In a career that started on the University of Ghana campus as a drink-up DJ, DJ Vyrusky was the resident DJ at University of Ghana's student's hangout joint, TymeOut where he doubled as the in-house DJ for all EchoHouse and Lynx Entertainment events.

Between 2010 and 2011 as a final year student at the University of Ghana Business School, he started playing outside campus and perfected his art through competitions with other campus DJs and friends.

=== Breakthrough ===
By 2013, DJ Vyrusky had started making waves outside campus and was the resident DJ at Club 45 now Gold Coast Restaurant. At Club 45, he won the award for Discovery of the Year in the maiden Ghana DJ Awards 2014.

He followed it up with Event DJ and Club DJ the next year at the Ghana DJ Awards in 2014/2015 and moved into full-time DJing at Starr FM where he initially played on Club Arena with DJ French Kiss and hosts, Nii Ayi and Bianca Buckman before moving to Starr Drive with Bola Ray. At the 2017 edition of Ghana Music Honors, he was awarded the Best DJ Honors award.

=== Artiste DJ ===
Late 2015, he became the official DJ for MzVee and traveled with her across the country. In the same period, he won the Event DJ of the Year at the Ghana DJ Awards. He was also picked as the artiste DJ for Shatta Wale in early 2016 and toured with the artiste on his UK Tour.He has many hits in the Ghana music industry.

=== Debut single ===
As a DJ, Vyrusky is known for his signature use of authentic Ghanaian music like highlife for mixes, as seen in his debut single 'Number'. Featuring Kojo Cue and Kuami Eugene, the single blends Ghanaian highlife with hiplife.

=== Shows ===
DJ Vyrusky successfully hosted his first show at the St. Thomas Aquinas SHS to talk about the abuse of drugs.

== Awards and nominations ==
Year	Award Ceremony	Award Description	Result	Reference
2024	Ghana DJ Awards	Event DJ of the Year	Nominated	
2024	Ghana DJ Awards	Artiste DJ of The Year	Nominated	
2024	Ghana DJ Awards	DJ of The Year	Nominated	
2019	3 Music Awards	DJ of the Year	Won	
2018	Radio and Television Personality Awards	Radio Dj Of The Year	Won	
2017	Ghana Entertainment Awards	Best DJ	Won	
2017	Ghana Music Honors	Best DJ Honors	Won	
2017	Ghana DJ Awards	Greater Accra DJ of the Year	Won	
2017	Ghana DJ Awards	Event DJ of the Year	Won	
2017	Ghana DJ Awards	Artistes DJ of the Year	Won	
2017	Ghana DJ Awards	Best DJ of the Year	Won	
2016	Africa Youth Choice Awards	DJ of the Year	Nominated	
2016	NEA Awards, USA	Best African DJ	Nominated	
2016	Ghana-Naija Showbiz Awards	DJ of the Year	Nominated	
2016	Radio and Television Personality Awards	Radio DJ of the Year	Won	
2015	Ghana DJ Awards	DJ of the Year	Nominated	
2015	Ghana DJ Awards	Events DJ of the Year	Won	
2014	Ghana DJ Awards	Club DJ of the Year	Won	
2014	Ghana DJ Awards	Events DJ of the Year	Won	
2013	Ghana DJ Awards	Discovery of the Year	Won	

== Discography ==
=== Singles ===
==== 2018 ====
- Never Carry Last ft. Mayorkun x Kuami Eugene

==== 2017 ====
- Number ft. Ko-Jo Cue and Kuami Eugene
- Adwenfi ft. Shatta Wale and Kuami Eugene

=== Mixes ===
==== 2014 ====
- Muse I
- Muse II

==== 2015 ====
- 1957 Volume I
- Skolom Ay3late Mix
- Hello Hotline

==== 2016 ====
- 1957 Volume II
- Thank You Mix
- Timmy Cut
- Tidal Rave Mix
- Cabana Mix
