= Ish Kevin =

Rwandan Musician

- Also known as: Trappish Boy
- Born: Kevin Semana; November 13, 1997 (age 28)
- Genres: Kinyatrap; Brooklyn drill
- Occupation: Rapper

Ish Kevin is a Rwandan rapper,musician and record executive. He is cited as one of the forefathers of the Kinya trap movement and spinoff Trapp ish movement and is the founder of the label imprint Trapp ish Records. He has been ranked No. 9 on the Top 12 Best African Rappers of 2021 by The Native, and the song "No Cap" has been placed on the 7 Hard Drill Tracks from Around the World by GRM Daily.

== Career ==
Ish Kevin began his music career in 2018, gaining recognition through his single Waki Waki release in 2020. He then went on to release numerous songs that quickly became popular and he released the album Blood Sweat & Tears (shortened to BST) on September 23, 2023. The album features 10 tracks and has multiple appearances from other Rwandan artists such as Shemi and Bobby Bangs. Ish Kevin told Rwandan newspaper The New Times that the album explores the challenges and struggles he faced growing up, and the bright vision he had for his music career. Kevin progressed musically from the drill and rap sound of his previous works, with him saying the album is a fusion of modern genres and traditional Rwandan sound. The album's intro starts with a sample of Ruti Joel's "Kwivuga" vocals, popular in traditional Rwandan ceremonies, and the ninth track features additional melodies from the Inanga. The album was produced by various Rwandan producers such as Pro Zed, Joeka$$h, and Bailey Pro among others.

On June 13, 2024, Ish Kevin released his third extended play (EP) Semana. The EP, named after himself, was thought by many to be a response to the Zeo Trap diss track "Sinabaye", but Kevin denied this—saying it focuses on himself and his desires in the music industry. Semana was received positively by fans, with a majority picking the opening song "Iki?".

Ish Kevin released the single "Africa Rise" in February 2025. He also released Rivals feat R.M.H produced by Simplice Himbaza commonly known as AY. The song shares themes of African unity, resilience, self-representation, and the beauty of Africa. The song was produced by Just Mike and Juni Quickly and mastered by Bob Pro. The song immediately began trending on various streaming platforms.

== Influence and legacy ==
Nigerian music magazine The Native ranked Kevin at No. 9 on the Top 12 Best African Rappers of 2021, regarding him as of the best and biggest Drill artists in Africa and by extension one of the best and biggest rap artists in Africa. The magazine proclaimed that his "gift as a formidable rap artist" was undeniable along with his "star power", citing a recent stadium-sized headlining concert as evidence. The Native also said that "every output from [Ish Kevin] felt definitive", proclaiming his first release of 2021, "Amakosi", as "an insanely catchy anthem with the conceited hallmarks of Brooklyn drill, but with a distinctly Rwandan pulse via Ish Kevin’s lingual choice, his titanic presence and limber flow over the groovy beat." "Akamosi" also received over one million views on YouTube.

In November 2021, the song "No Cap" was placed on the 7 Hard Drill Tracks from Around the World list by British music outlet GRM Daily, which cited Kevin as the front of the drill scene forming in Rwanda. Author Joe Hale wrote, "his flows and cadence on the mic are undeniable, along with his overall persona."

== Discography ==
Studio albums

- Trappish II (February 25, 2022)
- BST (2023) – Full title: Blood, Sweat & Tears

Extended plays

- Semana (2024)

Singles

- "Amakosi" (2021)
- "No Cap" (2021)
- "Africa Rise" (2025)

== See also ==
- African hip-hop § Rwanda
