= Farewell Fondle 'Em =

Compilation album by various artists
- Released: October 30, 2001
- Genre: Hip hop
- Length: 67:31
- Label: Definitive Jux
- Producers: Godfather Don; B. Slim; Groovy Lou; MF Doom; Lord Sear; Rob Swift; MHz; Don Q; Marvin Daniels; Copywrite; Draztik; X-Amount; Snazz D; Flux; DJ Eli

Definitive Jux chronology
Def Jux Presents (2001)	Farewell Fondle 'Em (2001)	Definitive Jux Presents II (2002)

Farewell Fondle 'Em is a compilation album that marked the ending of Fondle 'Em Records. It was released on Definitive Jux on October 30, 2001.

== Critical reception ==
Professional ratings
Review scores
Source	Rating
Christgau's Consumer Guide	(1-star Honorable Mention)

Nathan Rabin of The A.V. Club viewed Farewell Fondle 'Em as an "homage to Bobbito's low-budget, overachieving indie". Matt Cibula of PopMatters wrote, "The music on Farewell Fondle 'Em was never going to set the commercial world on fire -- it's too weird, too edgy, too much fun to listen to."

In 2015, Fact placed the album at number 66 on its "100 Best Indie Hip-Hop Records of All Time" list.

== Track listing ==
No.	Title	Artist(s)	Length
1.	"Freestyle (Interlude)"	Kool Keith	0:39
2.	"Kick a Dope Verse"	The Cenobites featuring Bobbito	4:10
3.	"I'm Gonna Kill U"	Juggaknots	4:04
4.	"Freestyle (Interlude)"	Cage	0:43
5.	"Freestyle (Interlude)"	El-P and J-Treds	4:42
6.	"Freestyle (Interlude)"	The Arsonists	1:02
7.	"The Session (Dirty 89tec9 Mix)"	The Arsonists	4:11
8.	"Flossin"	Yak Ballz	3:46
9.	"Dead Bent (Original 12" Version)"	MF Doom	3:16
10.	"Turn Up the Fucking Bass"	Lord Sear featuring DJ Cucumber Slice	1:46
11.	"Alcoholic Vibes"	Lord Sear	4:42
12.	"Scars and Memories"	MF Grimm	6:03
13.	"World Premiere"	MHz	4:33
14.	"Powers of Nine Ether (Distorted Views of Life)"	Scienz of Life	4:59
15.	"Widespread"	Jakki tha Mota Mouth featuring Copywrite	5:10
16.	"Blaze tha Breaks"	Cashless Society featuring Snazz D, Black Intellect, and X-Amount	5:28
17.	"Beat You in the Head"	Binkis featuring Jax and Flux	3:58
18.	"Fondle'em Fossils"	DJ Eli, Breeze, Q-Unique, Godfather Don, J-Treds, and MF Doom	4:19
