= Simplice Himbaza =

Rwandan recording artist

Himbaza Simplice Elinathan, commonly known as AY born in June 6, 2003 (age 22) in Rwamagana, Rwanda is a Rwandan recording artist, music producer and founder of record label called GMF (short for Get Money Forever).

== Early life and career ==
He was raised in Kigali city after spending his early years in Rwamagana district. He developed a passion for music through his family, particularly his older brothers, and his early experience playing piano in church. AY began his career as a music producer, working with prominent Rwandan artists in the hip-hop scene, as well as serving as a mixing and mastering engineer. He later started working on his own projects. His first notable project, the Exit EP, was followed by the "Ideas" Mixtape, which helped establish his reputation. His production style blends hip-hop, afrobeat, and dancehall through both traditional and modern musical elements.

During his secondary school years, he produced hip-hop instrumentals that gained recognition among his peers. His first releases included the Exit EP and the Ideas Mixtape, the latter noted in local media for supporting the emergence of the GMF collective. In 2023, he founded GMF (Get Money Forever), a label and artistic collective that brought together performers including Hunni, Taz, Poppa, and Khire. In 2024, Himbaza produced a track for rapper Ish Kevin that surpassed 100,000 streams within its first month of release. On 1 July 2025, he released his debut studio album Youngest, a twelve-track record featuring guest appearances by Taz, Hunni, Poppa, Nzeythegreat, Real Roddy, and Khire.
