= Lemba =

Lemba may refer to:

- Lemba (grasshopper), a genus of insect in the subfamily Caryandinae
- Lemba people, an African ethnic group in Southern Africa

== Places ==
- Lemba, Kinshasa, a commune in Kinshasa, Democratic Republic of the Congo
- Lembá District, a district of São Tomé Province
- Lempa, Cyprus, village in Cyprus, also known as Lemba

== People ==
- Artur Lemba (1885–1963), Estonian composer and piano teacher
- Basaula Lemba (born 1965), Congolese football player
- Chilu Lemba (born 1975), Zambian radio and television presenter, voice over artist and musician
- Sebastián Lemba (1520–1547), Afro-Dominican slave rebel
