= Jane Kasumba =

Ugandan media personality and former sports pundit

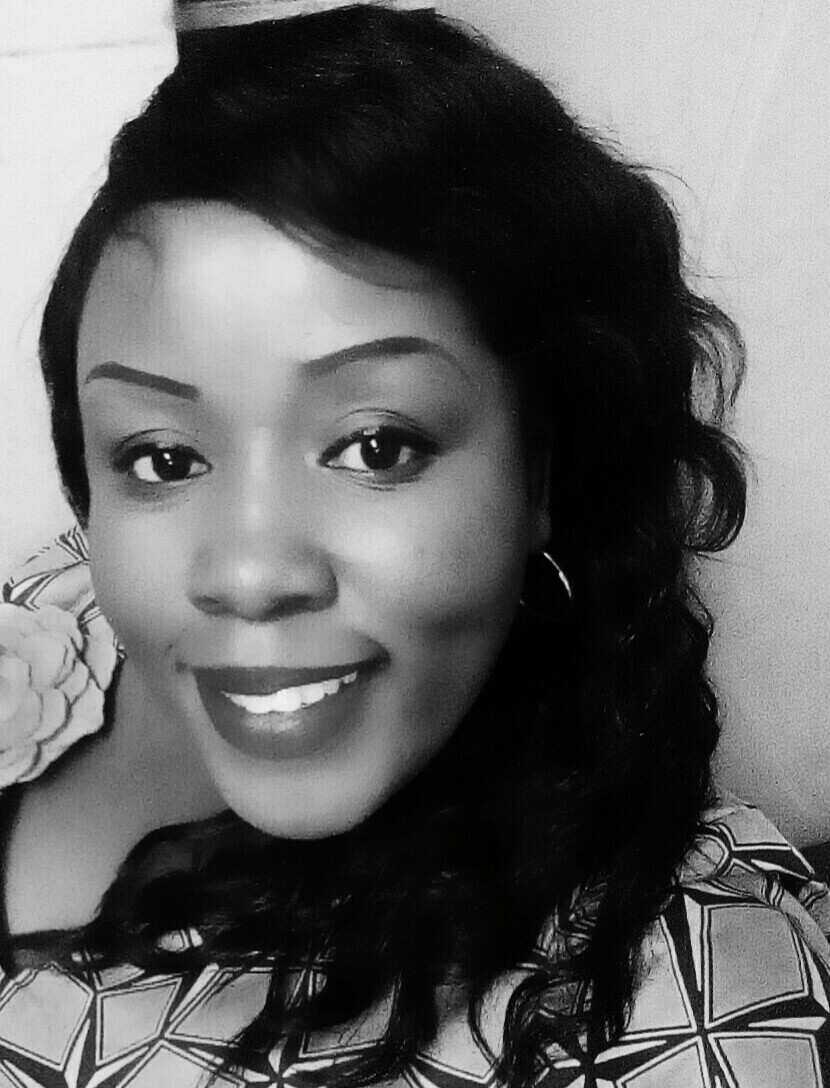
- Born: Uganda
- Occupation: Journalist

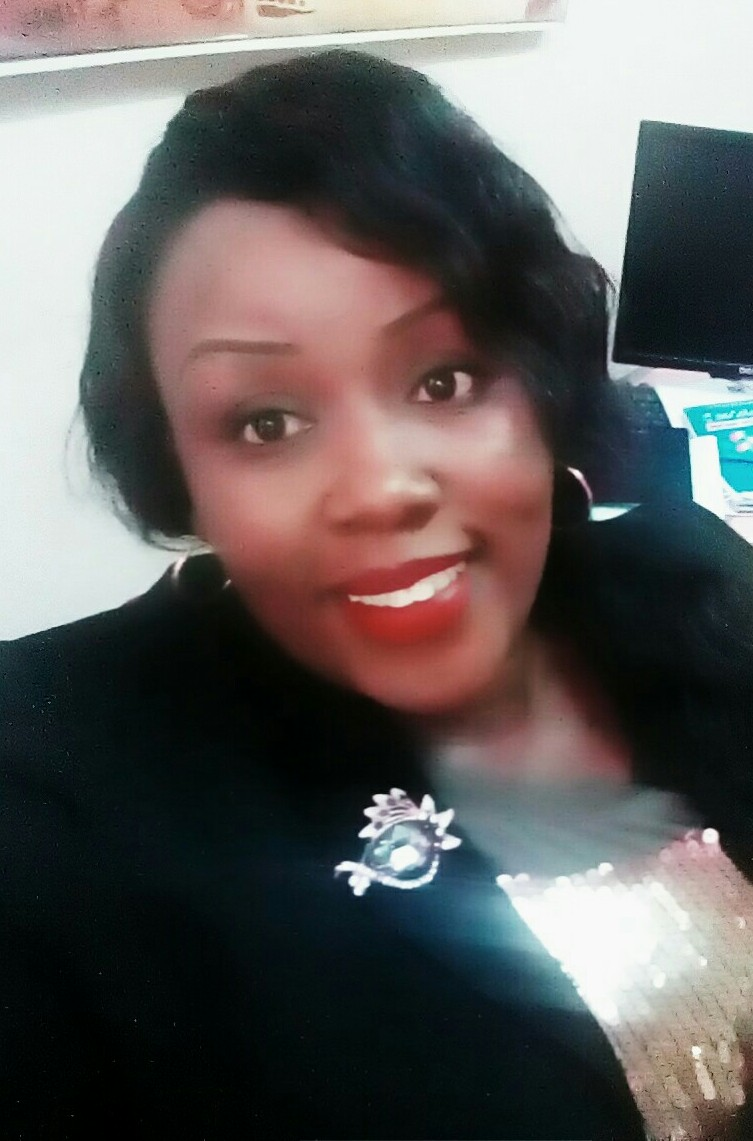

Jane Kasumba is a Ugandan media personality, broadcaster, lawyer, a communications expert and professional sportscaster. She most recently served as TV Manager for the Uganda Broadcasting Corporation (UBC).

== Education and background ==
Jane Kasumba was raised in both Africa and Europe and studied on both continents. She has a bachelor's degree in Political Science, a Bachelor of Laws degree and a Post Graduate Diploma in Law. She also has qualifications in television production from China and France. She has received 3 FICTS Awards and 3 RTV Awards amongst other accolades. In 2016 she was awarded by the Uganda Media Women's Association for her reportage of the Ugandan general elections.

== Career ==
Kasumba commenced her TV broadcast career at TV Africa as a continuity announcer. She took on responsibility for public relations at the national broadcaster in Uganda, later becoming its head of television. She has broadcast in sports and talk shows, and has been a master of ceremonies and moderator at events.
