= Tsakani Mhinga =

- Also known as: TK
- Born: 23 November 1978; Mary Mount Hospital, Johannesburg, South Africa
- Died: 27 February 2006 (aged 27) Bryanston, Johannesburg, South Africa
- Genres: R&B
- Occupations: Singer-songwriter; arranger
- Instrument: Vocals
- Years active: 2000–2006
- Label: Gallo Records

Tsakani "TK" Mhinga (23 November 1978 – 27 February 2006) was a multiple SAMA award winning South African R&B singer, arranger and songwriter. In her lifetime she unquestionably occupied South Africa's R&B throne and was one of the country's prominent vocalists.

She was found dead in a hotel room in Bryanston, Johannesburg by hotel staff on 27 February 2006 of a drug overdose. It remains unclear whether the overdose was intentional or accidental.

== Early life ==
Born in Soweto, Johannesburg, Tsakani was the eldest child of Tebogo Mhinga and Hosi Shilungwa Cydrick Mhinga of the VaTsonga tribe. She was therefore born into a royal house of the Mhinga Family. At age 12 she first sang in public, singing "Over the Rainbow" at a talent competition.

== Career ==
Her first taste of the music industry came from her electric, chemistry driven collaboration "A Place for a Wife" with rapper Mizchif on his debut album.

Since her father was opposed to her being a singer, she launched her solo musical career without telling her family as soon as she got her matric. She released "Mind Yo' Business" from her debut album, TKO and received critical acclaim for her vocals and international approach when it came to her music, but she was often ridiculed and criticised for not doing the vernacular, which was Kwaito or Afro-pop. The singer had her fair share of legal battles which occurred when TK was offered a seven album recording deal in the UK, only to have it revoked after threats from the local company that had produced her debut album. "I wanted to quit so many times. I never thought I'd bounce back", said TK about the incident.

This was followed in 2001 by a second album, Tsakani, that included the club hit "Eject yo' ass", and the R&B radio hit "I Find It So Strange". The 23-year-old singer won her second consecutive best R&B album at the SAMA awards and nominated for best female vocalist of the year.

In 2002, TK performed with international act Foxy Brown at the Gauteng R&B Hip Hop Festival and opened for Keith Sweat and Deborah Cox on their South African concerts. TK was also a participant in Celebrity Big Brother (South Africa) during this year. She was also offered the part for the pantomime; Sleeping Beauty but was pregnant at the time so she couldn't do it.

Her third and last album, Black Butterfly (2003) was considered her best, it was seen as a celebration of life and showcased the abundant music styles that TK excelled in. It included the upbeat "In This Piece" featuring Stagga, "How Do You Feel", "Black Butterfly" which received a warm reception and play listed on local radio stations, and a poignant rendition of "Over the Rainbow", of which TK professed a certain fondness. In celebration of this album, TK had the image of a butterfly tattooed on her in celebration of the new album. She said it was the record company boss' idea. "I made him phone my mother and ask her permission. She was fine with it. I'm very happy with it.... I think it's beautiful." For the album, she received her third consecutive best R&B SAMA award and for best music arrangement for the title track with her longtime producer Alexis Faku at the 2004 SAMA awards .

Despite being a celebrated artist, none of TK's albums sold more than 25,000 copies, though she still hoped to reach a worldwide audience, by infusing her style of Rhythm & Blues with an indigenous African flavour.

== Legal and contractual battles ==
During her short career, TK had some considerable legal wrangles, the first; surrounding her stage name "TK", with that of similar sounding Kwaito group TKZ. The second turned out to be disappointing, when she was offered a seven-record deal with UK-based label Polydor shortly after the release of her first album. This deal was quickly revoked after threats from the local producers of the album.

== Musical style ==
Her music is a fusion of styles, with tracks ranging from upbeat hip-hop which could be heard on the 2003 single In This Piece to sultry R&B ballads songs like Drowning in Heaven, Where Did I Go Wrong and some kwaito remixes thrown in tracks like No.1 Tsotsi and How Do You Feel.

TK had vocals which were often compared to Mariah Carey and when asked to comment on the similarity she said. "I think it's great, personally. She is one of the people who inspired me to get into the game and the plan was to make music that appeals to the world. If people are comparing me to a person who was it for an entire decade then I'm doing something right!" Her voice had a sincere yet powerful quality in it and she was often regarded as one of the country's best vocalists. TK had a considerable following under the South African gay community, based on her sassy vocals, cheeky lyrics, the grinding beats of her tracks and for her beauty and seemingly bubbly personality.

== Personal life ==
In 2002, she caused minor tremors posing nude for local women's magazine Pace, while pregnant. She had one child, her son Oratile, and raised him as a single parent. She refused to reveal the identity of her son's father, who left her before the birth, saying that only the baby needs to know who his father is. TK's single Mind yo' business off her debut album speaks of the realities of life where a Prince Charming does not exist. Her last relationship ended sometime around Valentine's Day, two weeks before her death, after which she subsequently moved into a hotel in Bryanston, while looking for a new home.

== Death ==
On the day before her death, Sunday 26 February 2006, she, apparently, was entertaining a few friends, including kwaito star Mandoza, at the hotel where she was staying. The gathering subsequently turned into a late-night party in her hotel room. At around 10:00 on Monday 27 February she spoke on the phone with her manager, and at around 11:00 a friend dropped by, wanting to take her to lunch. She declined, saying she was going to take a bath. Mhinga was found dead at approximately 13:30 by hotel staff, after she failed to answer their calls. Speculation that someone else was in the room with her is derived from the fact that her partially dressed body was found covered with a sheet. Police have stated though, that her body did not have any marks on it, and that there was no sign of forced entry into her room. The most common assumption is that the cause of death was either a drug overdose or a drug-induced suicide.

Mhinga was working on her fourth album at the time of her death. EMI records plans to release a compilation of her work. A trust had also been established for her young son. Local newspapers were quick to make comparisons between Tsakani Mhinga's death and that of other 27-year-old musicians, such as Jim Morrison, Jimi Hendrix, Janis Joplin and Kurt Cobain.

== Awards ==
TK received four South African Music Awards (the SA equivalent of the Grammy) for "Best R&B album", one for each of her albums and "Best Song Arrangement. She was also nominated for two MTN MetroFM music awards, for "Best R&B Artist" and "Best Female Artist" respectively.

== Discography ==
- TKO 2000
- Tsakani 2001
- Black Butterfly 2003
