= Daddy Zemus =

- Birth name: Anthony Mbinga Kafunya
- Born: 1 May 1968; Lusaka, Zambia
- Died: 3 January 2001 (aged 30); Lusaka, Zambia
- Genres: Dancehall, ragga, reggae, hip hop, R&B
- Occupations: Singer; songwriter; record producer
- Instrument(s): Vocals and Lead guitarist
- Years active: 1988–2000
- Labels: Mondo Music

Anthony Mbinga Kafunya (1 May 1968 – 3 January 2001), known professionally as Daddy Zemus, was a Zambian musician and songwriter. Hailed as the King of Zam-ragga, he was one of the first artists to fuse local music with ragga, hip-hop and R&B, and is widely regarded as a pioneer in this form of Zambian music. After signing with the fledgling record label Mondo Music, Zemus released the chart topping album Chibaba in December 1999 to critical acclaim, and it turned out to be one of the most influential albums in Zambian music history, as it heralded the new wave of Zambian sound and inspired several other upcoming Zambian musicians.

== Life and career ==
Daddy Zemus was born in Lusaka and had a comfortable upbringing as his father owned a security company and other businesses. He went to Kabulonga Boys Secondary School where he dabbled in drama together with future stage actor Augustine Lungu and musician Maiko Zulu. Zemus identified with the social consciousness advocated by reggae music, which was further imbued in him through the weekly gathering of the Rasta community at the University of Zambia grounds. These weekend gatherings had Rastafarians from different walks of life including musicians such as the Zion Dub Squad, a group which Zemus joined and had Brian “Shakarongo” Chengela, Papa Zai and Ras Tammuz in its ranks, who were probably the three most influential people in shaping Zemus’ musical direction.

Shakarongo started organizing the annual reggae festivals at Munda Wanga gardens which provided exposure for upcoming reggae musicians, and Zemus first started out as a reggae vocalist and learned how to play guitar and keyboards along the way. He also read widely, following the philosophies of activists such as Marcus Garvey, Frantz Fanon and Walter Rodney. Apart from being conversant with a wide range of music forms, ideologies, and the political struggle on the African continent and beyond, his other interests included cuisine, fine arts and poetry. Among others, Shakarongo, Zemus, Papai Zai, Ras Tammuz and Patrick Chisembele later teamed up to form Shakarongo Combination.

With the rising popularity of ragga, toasters such as Shabba Ranks and Chaka Demus gained a following in Zambia and were influential in Zemus’ evolution as a musician. Zambian ‘Zam-rock’ musician Paul Ngozi, who had managed to garner a wide fan base by blending rock music with local sounds was also an influence in Zemus’ transition to ragga, as he was motivated to explore various sounds and create his own style by bringing in other performers to flavour it with particular crossover elements. The name Zemus is believed to have been taken from the second part of the name of one of his heroes Chaka Demus, with the ‘D’ replaced by ‘Z’, while ‘Daddy’ was added later.

Another local rapper MC Wabwino, who was already toasting in Nyanja was a major influence in the new direction that Daddy Zemus’ music was taking. This direction was first witnessed in Zemus’ first album, Salaula which was released in 1997 and was produced by Papa Zai who believed that the album set the tone for the new wave of Zambian music. It featured social commentary on popular tracks like the title track, "Zambian Girls" and "Kokoliko".

For his next album, Zemus was looking to collaborate with other musicians and that's when a young singer and keyboard player called Mainza Chipenzi caught his attention. The two began collaborating and the first song they produced was "Juju Lover" in 1998. Work on Zemus' second album of the same name commenced but due to lack of resources, they were compelled to record in Zemus' living room and despite the low quality of the production, the title track received a lot of air play on local radio stations. Due to the overwhelming response from the public, businessman Rodgers Sombe realized that the duo were onto something and sponsored their trip to South Africa to work on the album using better recording facilities. Unfortunately, their relationship with their benefactor soured as Sombe later decided to concentrate on his business and they returned to Zambia after eight months with a few copies of the album that could not satisfy the demand. Although they managed to find another sponsor, they never managed to fully produce and market the album.

In 1999, Chisha Folotiya set up the Mondo Music label and he signed up Zemus as one of his first acts, and Mainza as in-house producer for the label. Chibaba was released on 24 December 1999 and was a critical and commercial success, topping the local music charts from the time of its release to April of the following year. The album featured Mainza's vocals on all the tracks had hits such as "Anyamataa," "Chibaba," "Fatness" and "Nkhala Olimba." Despite the impressive sales of the album, Zemus however shared with friends that the royalties that came his way were far less than he had expected.

== Death ==
In 2000, Zemus was working on the follow-up album to Chibaba, when he began suffering poor health and after being ill for some time, died on 3 January 2001 in Lusaka. He was survived by wife Carol and two sons.

== Legacy ==
Daddy Zemus was the first to rhyme in a local Zambian language. He not only inspired a lot of Zambian musicians to rap and sing in vernacular, but he also had an influence on songwriting. Mainza acknowledged Zemus’ contribution to his own music career and dedicated his debut album Mainza to him, saying “Everything I am now, I owe to him because he changed the way I looked at Zambian songwriting."

== Discography ==
- Salaula (1997)
- Chibaba (1999)
