= Leslie 'Lee' Kasumba =

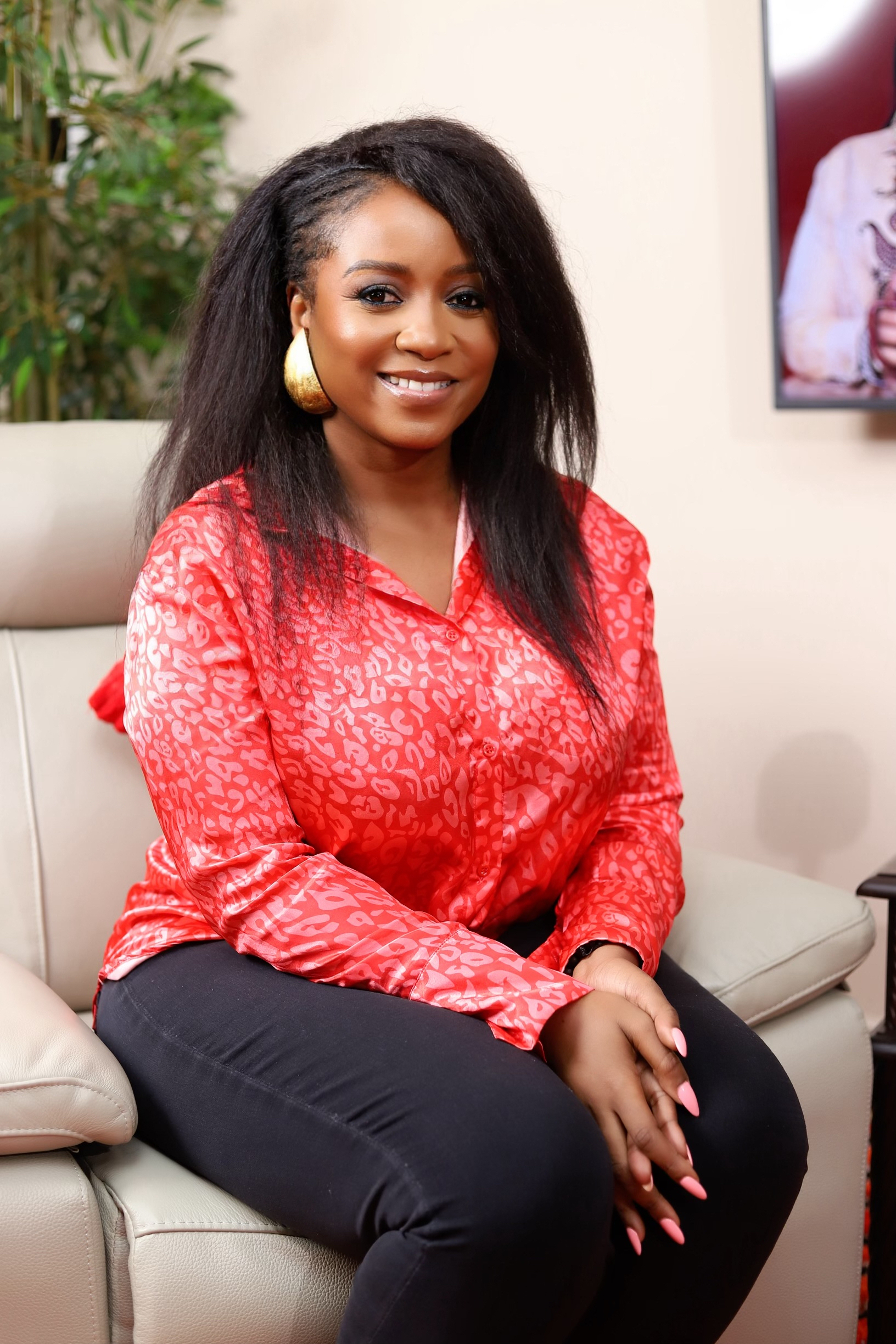
- Born: Leslie Kasumba; September 2, 1980 (age 45); Uganda
- Other names: Lee, Miss Media
- Occupations: Radio and TV presenter, media personality, writer, singer, songwriter
- Years active: 1999 - present

Leslie 'Lee' Kasumba (born September 2, 1980) Leslie "Lee" Kasumba is a Ugandan radio and TV presenter, media personality, writer, singer, and songwriter in Africa.

She has worked as the Head of Channel O Africa since 2011.

== Early life ==
Leslie Kasumba was born in Cuba and raised in South Africa. Her parents initially wanted her to study something more academic, but by the time she was 19, she began working as a Dj and entered the field of entertainment.

== Career ==
Leslie Kasumba began working as a DJ at the age of 19, when she was selected as a DJ and producer for the biggest radio station in South Africa, YFM. During the 8 years she worked there, she also functioned as the editor at Y Magazine. Lee Kasumba also began writing for Centric Magazine, hosted the Price of Fame panel with Quincy Jones and interviewed Tony Blair for the first ever 'MTV Base Meets'.

Leslie Kasumba has served as a TV host for Emcee Africa. She also hosted the African Live 8 music concert, and presented the Key Note address to the United Nations at the Global African Hip-Hop Summit. Her radio show, “Arambe” was the biggest radio show to come out of South Africa and the first to actively promote and support South African nationals.

Leslie Kasumba has worked internationally as an on-air personality. She has presented African radio shows in Norway, co-hosted the BBC's "World Have Your Say" along with Ross Atkins which was broadcast to over 20 million people worldwide, and was continually invited to be a panellist on the show. She's worked with radio stations in Netherlands on a program called 'This Is Africa' their biggest hip-hop radio program.

Leslie Kasumba has worked as the head of Channel O Africa for 3 years. She has worked as part of the Big Brother Africa panel, worked on the Channel O Awards Team, been a team member of the AMVCA and participated in numerous talks internationally.

Leslie Kasumba is also regarded as having played an important role in Hip hop in Africa. Due to her love and relevance to the culture, she's been labelled the 'First Lady of Hip hop' in South Africa. She's hosted several hip-hop battles in South Africa, and travelled around the continent as TV host for Emcee Africa. She's exclusively interviewed various International hip hop acts, including Damian Marley, K’naan, Ludacris, Snoop Dogg, Missy Elliott, Eve and Praz of the Fugees, and hosted the Live 8 and the "Mixtape Interviews" with Missy Elliott. She's also the First African woman to be featured in XXL Magazine.

Kasumba emceed Beyoncé's concert in South Africa, and has been a judge at the BET awards, South Africa Music Awards and Hype Magazine Hip Hop Awards.

Kasumba is also a singer and songwriter who has performed at Alicia Key’s Banquet and performed backup vocals for award-winning albums.

Kasumba appeared on the cover of Black, Mania, Y! Naija, Genevieve and more recently the June 2014 edition of Exquisite Magazine.

== Community work ==
She is the owner and co-founder of Harambe Africa, which aims to link African Youth together through hip hop music.

Leslie Kasumba is the head of Channel O Africa, a position she has held since 2011.
