= Siah and Yeshua DapoED =

Hip hop duo from New York, U.S.

- Origin: New York City, U.S.
- Genres: Hip hop
- Years active: 1996–1998
- Label: Fondle 'Em
- Members: Siah; Yeshua DapoED

Siah and Yeshua DapoED was an East Coast hip hop duo from New York.

== Music career ==
Siah and Yeshua DapoED released their 1996 debut vinyl-only album The Visualz EP on Bobbito Garcia's record label Fondle 'Em Records. The EP featured rapping from the group's two MCs, production from Jon Adler, and a guest appearance by Ken Bugaloo. "A Day Like Any Other" was listed by Spectrum Culture as one of the best songs over 10 minutes. A remix, "A Day Like No Other", was released on Mary Joy Records in 1998. The track features Yeshua DapoED, Murs, EL-P, and Shing02 freestyling over beats from the original song. "The Cure for Stagnation" appears on the 1998 compilation album Deeper Concentration. Siah and Yeshua also appear together on T. Love's "Return Of The B-Girl" EP on the song "LA To Brooklyn". Sound Colour Vibration praised The Visualz, calling it "a crowning achievement of the 90's hip hop movement".

Siah and Yesh also went on to record various solo tracks and the duo appeared on numerous compilations and as featured artists on a plethora of tracks. The duo recorded a number of tracks with the UK's Unsung Heroes that were released on Scenario Records. They recorded a track for the Deeper Concentration compilation before Siah quit rapping to concentrate on Middle-East politics. Yeshua, now known as Yesh, has gone on to release a solo LP titled Into Fresh Things in 2002, and began recording with his crew Wee Bee Foolish. Siah recorded a track in 2005, "The Long Night" on which he rapped in English, Hebrew, and Arabic.

Siah and Yeshua DapoED's debut vinyl-only album The Visualz EP was released on CD for the first time by the Traffic Entertainment Group in 2008. The expanded 20-track compilation version of the album titled The Vizualz Anthology featured most of their recorded work together, along with solo tracks and radio appearances, that also included some unreleased tracks.

== Discography ==
- The Visualz EP (1996)
- The Visualz Anthology (2008)
