= Jimmy B =

- Born: Jimmy Bangura
- Occupations: musician, filmmaker, producer and entertainer.

Jimmy B, born Jimmy Bangura, is a Sierra Leonean musician, filmmaker, producer and entertainer. He has been called the "Godfather of Sierra Leone music".

== Life ==
Jimmy B acted in the Eddie Murphy's 1988' romantic comedy Coming to America before moving to South Africa, setting up a music studio there and achieving success as a musician. After the end of the Sierra Leone Civil War in 2002, Jimmy B facilitated the release of several hip hop albums and compilations from Paradise Studio.

In 2014 Bangura privately funded Ebola 4 Go, a video educating people about ebola. He has presented The Jimmy B Show, a radio show on Freetown's AiRadio which specializes in Sierra Leonean music.

In 2019 his teenage son drowned in the United States of America.

== Films ==
- Paradise Island (2009)
- Guardian of the Throne (2014)
- A Stitch in Time (2014)
- The British Expert (2019)
