= Chilu Lemba =

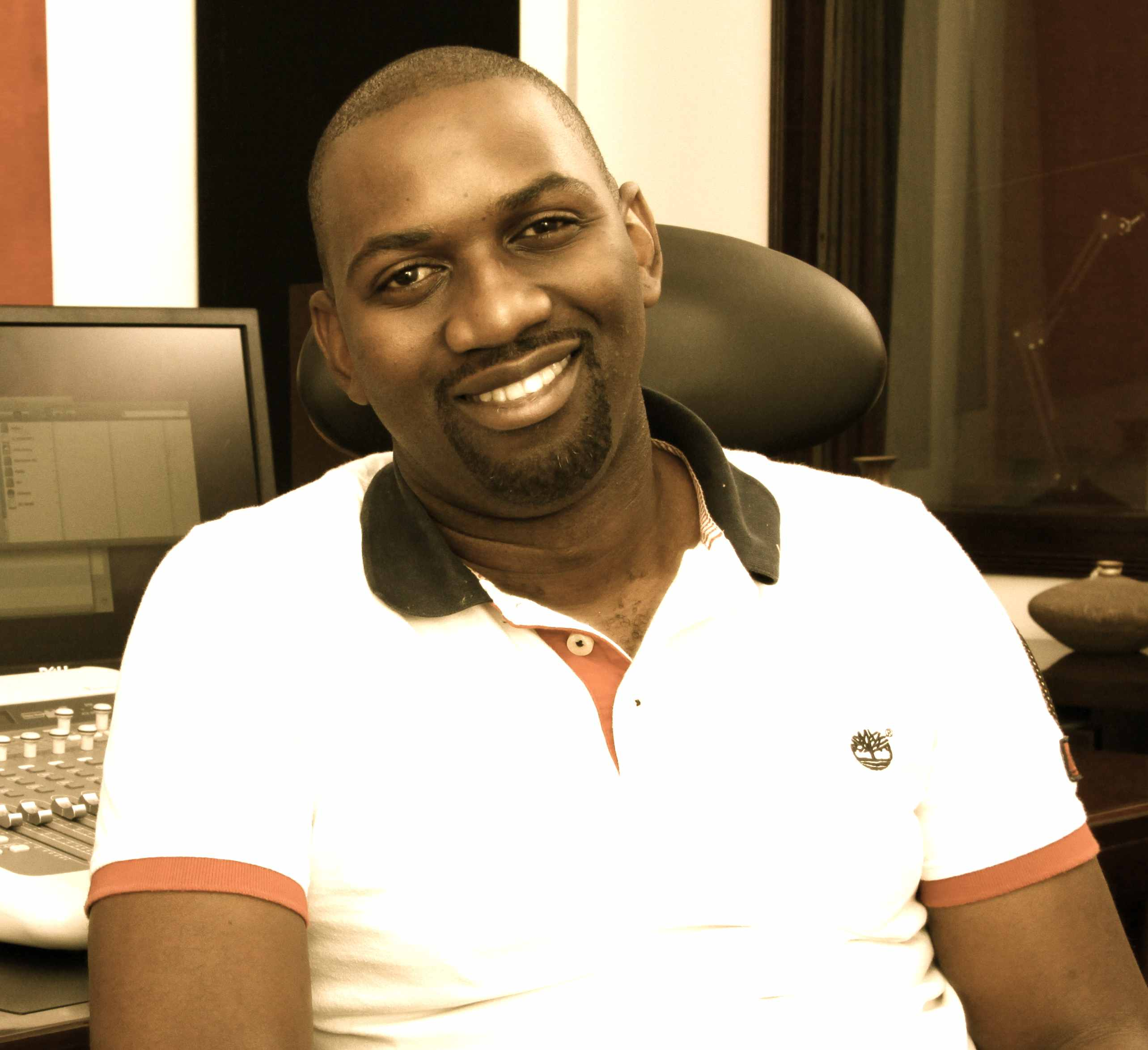
- Chilu Lemba at Ten 27 Studios
- Born: Chilungu Lemba; 27 August 1975 (age 51); Lusaka, Zambia
- Occupations: Radio presenter, voiceover artist, singer-songwriter, musician, record producer
- Years active: 1994–present
- Spouse: Caroline Madekurozwa Lemba
- Children: 2
- Website: chilulemba.com

Chilu Lemba (born 27 August 1975) is a Zambian-born and South African–based award-winning voice over artist, author and musician. His voice is heard across the African continent daily on ads ranging from branding commercials for washing detergents and cellphone networks, to promos for satellite television channels.

A graduate of the AAA School of Advertising, Lemba has over two decades experience in collaborating with media institutions, production companies and has been the voice of the Eyewitness News brand heard daily on Talk Radio 702 and Cape Talk, for the past ten years. He also voices thousands of communication ads annually for brands such as Nissan, BCX, SuperSport, Old Mutual, UNHCR and more.

In June 2019, he released his memoir titled Finding My Voice detailing his journey in the media industry.

Chilu Lemba won the award for Best TV Promo in 2022 (2022) at the Voice Over Awards hosted by The Association of African Podcasters and Voice Artists. He was also awarded the Voice Arts Award in the Outstanding Commercial - TV or Streaming - Best African Voiceover (2022) category, hosted by The Society of Voice Arts and Sciences

Other achievements include the APVA Spotlight of the Year (2022) Legacy Recognition award for excellent work as an industry expert and key supporter of the African audio industry.

== Music ==
Chilu Lemba has been involved in numerous musical projects since becoming a recipient of the Chengelo Secondary School Music Award in 1992. He is known for writing and recording Afro Hip hop hits "Zambia Moto" and "Shibuka" featuring Alan Mvula and Kora Award nominee – Joe Chibangu respectively, as well as the song Njota featuring Hip hop artist Zubz and Zambian producer TK Siyandi. Lemba's debut solo CD, Sound Legacy, which led to a number of radio hits in his home country, was released under Ten Twenty Seven Communications, a company he co-owns with his wife.

He credits his musical sound to encouragement he received from Beats International and particularly, Norman Cook (a.k.a. Fatboy Slim) during a Rap workshop held on the group's African tour in the early nineties. They encouraged delegates to express African originality.

In 2011, Lemba began recording his second album titled Flowers, Needles & Drumbeats, which he released in June 2012. The album featured the Njota Remix which was nominated for Best Foreign Video at the Born n Bred Music Awards 2014, losing out to Zone Fam's Translate.

== Television, voice overs and radio ==
Between 1997 and 1999 Lemba began in radio at Radio Phoenix Zambia where he worked as a Station Manager. He went on to earn a Higher Diploma in Integrated Marketing Communications in 2001 from the Graduate AAA School of Johannesburg, South Africa as well as an IAA Diploma in Marketing Communications. Lemba joined Young & Rubicam, South Africa as a Project Manager in 2001 before moving on to become a Presenter at Primedia Broadcasting (from 2004 to 2006) on 94.7 Highveld Stereo.

His voice has been heard on many television and radio spots across Africa, notably on the Coca Cola Popstars television series, where he was the voice narrator for three seasons. His voice has also featured on inserts in FIFA's live broadcast of the 2010 FIFA World Cup round robin draw seen across the world in 2008, as well as the animated introductory video chronicling the rise of Zakumi– the 2010 FIFA World Cup South Africa mascot. Lemba's voice can be heard at a number of widely broadcast events including The Kora All Africa Music Awards and the Confederation of African Footballs' (CAF) 2013 Orange Africa Cup of Nations opening ceremony held in South Africa.

Alongside Sandy Ngema in Season 4, and Claire Mawisa in seasons 5 and 6, he co-anchored the lifestyle magazine television show Africa Within which was broadcast on SABC Africa and SABC 2.

In 2005 he co-founded Ten 27 Communications with his wife.

== The Annual Lusaka Radio Summit ==
In 2009, Chilu founded an annual radio conference at which media practitioners share their experiences. The inaugural Lusaka Radio Summit was held in October of the same year at The Martin Luther King Center also known as the American Center in Lusaka, Zambia. Mobile network company MTN Zambia took on the sponsorship of the event and dubbed it The MTN Lusaka Radio Summit. After 2018, Zambian bank ZANACO became the headline sponsor and the event has since rebranded to be called The Zanaco Lusaka Radio Summit.

== Awards ==
- Voice Arts Award in the category: Outstanding Commercial - TV or Streaming - Best African Voiceover (2022) hosted by The Society of Voice Arts and Sciences
- Voice Arts Award in the category Outstanding Commercial - Radio or Web - Best African Voiceover (2023) hosted by The Society of Voice Arts and Sciences
- Best TV Promo (2022) Voice Over Award hosted by The Association of African Podcasters and Voice Artists
- APVA Spotlight of The Year in the Voice Over Category (2022) hosted by The Association of African Podcasters and Voice Artists
- Play Your Part Ambassador (Brand South Africa)

== Private life ==
He is married to Carol. They have two daughters.

== Discography ==
- Shibuka (The Rhythm Nation Project) (2000) released by Mondo Music Corporation
- Sound Legacy (2006) released by Ten Twenty Seven Productions
- "Ccuita" (2011) – Single – released by Ten 27 Communications
- "Flowers, Needles & Drumbeats" (2012) – Album – released by Ten 27 Communications
- "Njota" – Remix Single (2012) – released by Ten 27 Communications
