= Ghana DJ Awards =

Awards event in Ghana

- Description: Outstanding achievements in the music industry of Ghana
- Country: Ghana
- Presented by: Merqury Republic
- First award: February 15, 2012; 14 years ago
- Website: www.ghanadjawards.org

Television/radio coverage
- Network: Multi TV

The Ghana DJ Awards are an annual ceremony to recognize and honor disc jockeys and other individuals who have influenced electronic dance music in Ghana. Its purpose is to foster the development of the Ghana music industry by rewarding and celebrating radio, mobile and club DJs who have excelled in their profession. The annual event highlights contributions Ghana DJs have made to the music distribution and promotion industry by playing, endorsing and publishing songs.

== History ==
The awards were founded in 2011. Conceived by Merqury Quaye, the first Ghana DJ Awards ceremony was held at the National Theatre on 15 February 2012. Notable disc jockeys who have performed at the awards ceremony include DJ Que, DJ Vyrusky, DJ Kofi, DJ Black and DJ Jimmy Jatt.

== Awards ==
As of 2015, awards were presented in thirty-four categories.

In September 2020, the organizers introduced a new category, "Lockdown DJ of the Year", to award DJs who entertained music fans during the COVID-19 lockdown period.

== Categories ==
The top awards are presented in eight categories which include, Best DJ of the Year, Best International Non-Ghanaian DJ, Best International Ghanaian DJ, Discovery of the year, Best Event DJ of the Year, Artiste DJ of the Year, Best Mobile DJ of the Year and Best Mixtape DJ of the Year. Other categories include, DJ/Artist Collaboration of the Year, DJ's Song of The Year, Scratch DJ of The Year, Best Video Jockey of The Year, Best Club MC of The Year, Best Night Club DJ of The Year, Best Female Radio DJ of The Year, Best Male Radio DJ of The Year and Best Female DJ of The Year.

During the 2018, Mark Okraku-Mantey was awarded Ghana DJ Awards Lifetime Achievement Award at the 2018 Ghana DJ Awards for his service and contribution to the DJ profession in Ghana.

== Eligibility and entry ==
A jury of industry professionals is responsible for all award nominations. Once a work is nominated, an advisory board holds reviewing sessions to determine whether the work is entered in the correct category.

In September 2020, Ghana DJ Awards unveiled its newly appointed 12-member board of directors. The new board announced that DJs below 18 years of age would no longer be nominated in the Overall Best DJ of the Year category. Instead, they will compete for the Young DJ of the Year award. 13-year-old DJ Switch, who won Best DJ of the Year in 2019, was the first recipient of the newly created award.

== Changes ==
=== Venue ===
In October 2019, organizers of the event announced a new venue for the event. the event from the originally announced venue the National Theatre to the Accra International Conference Centre.

== Winners ==
=== 2024 Winners list ===
This years' event marked the 12th Edition of the annual Guinness Ghana DJ Awards which was held at the Palms Convention Centre in Accra on Saturday, November 9, 2024. DJ Lord OTB was awarded the DJ of the Year beating off competition from DJ Loft, DJ Vyrusky, TMSK DJ, AD DJ and DJ Millzy.

List of Winners
Category	Winners
DISCOVERY OF THE YEAR	DJ Vasty
MC/HYPEMAN OF THE YEAR	Kojo Manuel
EVENT DJ OF THE YEAR	DJ Pho
ARTISTE DJ OF THE YEAR	DJ Lord OTB – King Promise
SCRATCH DJ OF THE YEAR	DJ Mpesempese
MOBILE DJ OF THE YEAR	DJ Amachi
MIXTAPE OF THE YEAR	Cups & Bass Mixtape – DJ Loft & Kojo Manuel
VIDEO JOCKEY OF THE YEAR	DJ Aberga

== Controversies ==
In February 2012, there was growing controversy about the Ghana DJ Awards, a few weeks after the event was announced. The awards festival sparked speculations of rivalry and arguments between some known DJs in Accra.

In May 2012, Ghanaian DJs residing abroad have lamented about the unfairness on the part of organizers for allocating only one category for Ghanaian international DJs in the first ever honorary program for Ghanaian DJs. Organizers of the Awards later expressed their appreciation of the genuine concerns raised by the international DJs and explained that the suggestions and concerns would be reviewed and addressed accordingly in subsequent editions.

In October 2019, DJ Asumadu expressed his huge disappointment at the 2019 Ghana DJ Awards, after he felt snubbed by the organizers of the awards despite playing many shows in the clubs and events.
