= Mizchif =

- Birth name: Hechichamunorwa Mount Zion Kwenda
- Born: 23 June 1976; Salisbury, Rhodesia
- Origin: Highfields, Harare, Zimbabwe
- Died: 4 September 2014 (aged 38); Johannesburg, South Africa
- Genres: Hip hop
- Occupation: Rapper
- Years active: 1994–2014
- Labels: Eargasm, Fondle 'Em, Ghetto Ruff, Gallo Record Company

Hechichamunorwa Mount Zion Kwenda (23 June 1976 – 4 September 2014), better known as Mizchif, was a South African based Zimbabwean rapper. He was allegedly 'the first to independently release a solo hip hop album in South Africa,' and the first person in South Africa to perform hip hop with a live band.

== Early Background ==
Mizchif was born and raised in Highfield, Harare, Zimbabwe. He moved to Syracuse, New York at the age of 12 where he hooked up with a crew, Soul Pack, and began rapping. He moved to South Africa at 18, where he released his debut album Life from All Angles in 1999 on Eargasm Records. It was well received and had classics like "Place for a Wife" and "Fashionable," of which both respective music videos received constant airplay on several TV music channels across Africa.

Mizchif presented hip hop news on Johannesburg radio station YFM. He was also a video jockey on Nasty, a hip hop show on MNET music channel, Channel O. In 2001 Mizchif teamed up with Mavusana from kwaito group Oda Meeste, for the album Summertime on Ghetto Ruff records which had the infectious hit "Summertime".

His album Supernatural (My Return), was released in September 2003 and nominated for the Best Hip Hop Album at the 2003 South African Music Awards.

== Death ==
On 4 September 2014, Mizchif died due to ill health. He was 38. His funeral was held on 8 September 2014 in his hometown in Greendale, Harare, Zimbabwe at the Warren Hills cemetery.

== Discography ==
=== Singles ===
- "Fashionable" (1999)
- "Place for a Wife featuring TK" (1999)
- "Summertime feat Mavusana" (2001)
- "Ngiyazwa" (2001)
- "Wonderful World" (2003)

=== Albums ===
- Life from All Angles (1999)
- Mavusana meets Mizchif (Summertime) (2001)
- Supernatural (My Return) (2003)
