= Ivorian hip-hop =

Music genre

Hip hop is a major part of the popular music of Côte d'Ivoire, and has been fused with many of the country's native styles, such as zouglou.

== 90s popularity ==
Hip hop became a mainstream part of Ivorian music beginning in about 1998. Some time later, the scene gained more publicity with the rise of a publicly feuding pair of crew leaders, Stezo of the Flotte Imperiale and Almighty of the Ministère Authentik. There is a kind of gangsta rap-influenced Ivorian hip hop called rap dogba, inspired by Angelo & les Dogbas.

== "Foreigness" and growth ==
Overall, hip hop is still perceived in Ivory Coast as a foreign type of music and artists do not enjoy the popularity of their zouglou or Coupé-Décalé counterparts. It is considered a marginal movement with a specific following because most Ivorians did not find material or situations to relate to or connect with in Ivorian hip-hop. However, since 2006 and the rise of a new school of Ivorian rap crews such as the very popular Garba 50 (whose name is inspired by a very cheap and popular Ivorian dish eaten by the common people), hip hop is enjoying a newfound following among the Ivorian population. By blending Nouchi, the particular and very evocative Ivorian vernacular and street language, with hip hop beats and rhyming style, groups like Garba 50, Sans Soi, and Rage Man (among others) have managed to revitalize the movement and make it more accessible to Ivorians.

=== Ivorian artists outside Africa ===
A new generation of Ivorian rappers who live overseas in France or the U.S. like Djafoul Koncept, Dynamik Boobah Siddik, DDF, and many others have added to the growth of the movement in Ivory Coast by keeping in close touch with their Ivorian fan base and pushing technological and musical changes back to their native land.
