= Substance Abuse =

Substance Abuse may mean:

- Substance abuse, such as drug abuse
- Substance Abuse (band), a hip-hop group
- Substance Abuse, a 2009 mixtape by Smoke DZA, re-issued in 2012
- "Substance Abuse", the 20th episode of the anime Eureka Seven
