= List of Eureka Seven: AO episodes =

- No. of episodes: 24 + 2 OVA/ONA

Release
- Original network: MBS
- Original release: April 13 – November 20, 2012

Season chronology
- ← Previous; Eureka Seven

This is a list of episodes of Eureka Seven: AO, the sequel to Eureka Seven. The anime began airing on April 12, 2012, and ended on November 20, 2012. There is a total of 24 episodes. It has been released in Japan on Blu-ray and DVD, along with an OVA titled "The Flower Fields of Jungfrau". An additional episode titled "Lord Don't Slow Me Down" was released on YouTube to accompany the release of the Eureka Seven: AO pachislot game. This so-called "final episode" was split into four parts, with the first part uploaded on January 10, 2016 and subsequent parts in one-week intervals. On May 16, 2013, Funimation announced the official release date in English dub. The first twelve dubbed episodes were released on DVD/Blu-ray on August 13, 2013, and the rest of the series released on October 15, 2013.

For the series' first season (spanning the first 13 episodes), the opening theme is "Escape" performed by Hemenway and the ending theme is "stand by me" performed by Stereopony. Starting with episode 14, the opening theme changes to "Braveblue" (ブレイブルー, Bureiburū) performed by FLOW and the ending theme changes to "Iolite" (アイオライト, Aioraito) performed by joy.

The story revolves around Ao, a young boy living on the island of Iwato Jima in Okinawa who becomes the pilot of the Nirvash, a powerful mecha which belonged to his missing mother Eureka, and embarks on a journey to find the truth about her disappearance. The Japanese language title follows the original series' motif of using the names of songs as episode titles, but each AO episode has a thematic second English language title.

== Episode list ==
No.	Title	Musical reference	Written by	Original air date (Note: The show uses an after-midnight programming schedule, so the first broadcast was listed for April 12, 2005 at 25:55 which is the same as April 13 at 1:55 am.)	English release
1	"Born Slippy" (deep blue); Transliteration: "Bōn Surippī" (Japanese: ボーン・スリッピー)	"Born Slippy" by Underworld	Tobito Bura	April 13, 2012	October 8, 2013
The story begins in April 2025 at the Okinawa Islands. Thirteen-year-old Ao Fukai, after walking his childhood friend, Naru Arata, back to her home, stumbles upon smugglers Gazelle, Pippo and Han Juno. When a Scub Coral suddenly appears, Ao runs back to his house, accidentally taking a bracelet that the three were smuggling to the Japanese Armed Forces. The smugglers discover that the bracelet has gone missing, and they go to find Ao to retrieve it back the next day. When another Scub Coral appears containing a G-Monster, it wreaks havoc all over Iwato Jima. Ao soon realizes that the bracelet is one owned by his long-lost mother, Eureka, years ago and refuses to give it up.
2	"Call It What You Want" (AO's cavern); Transliteration: "Kōru Itto Howatto Yū Wonto" (Japanese: コール・イット・ホワット・ユー・ウォント)	"Call It What You Want!" by Richie Hawtin	Tobito Bura; Shō Aikawa	April 20, 2012	October 15, 2013
The G-Monster continues its attack on Iwato Jima, and Ao is forced to pilot an IFO, which was being transported by the Japanese Navy, and uses it to defeat the G-Monster. As the bracelet activates the IFO, his hair changes from brown to turquoise at the start of the battle, all while Team Pied Piper pilots Fleur Blanc and Elena Peoples watch, realizing that this IFO is the first ever model made.
3	"Still Fighting" (secret operation); Transliteration: "Sutiru Faitingu" (Japanese: スティル・ファイティング)	"Still Fighting" by The Sabres of Paradise	Tobito Bura; Shō Aikawa	April 27, 2012	October 22, 2013
Ao is kidnapped and taken into custody by local musician Kazuyuki Kaneshiro, who apologizes to him for what his generation has done. The citizens have blamed Eureka for the terrible accidents that befell the island when she had appeared out of nowhere in the past. Another Scub Coral surfaces, bringing forth a massive G-Monster in the area. The smugglers free Ao, bringing the boy back to the Nirvash, which he realizes must be the IFO piloted by his mother, and that he was the one meant to pilot it in her absence.
4	"Walk This Way" (plant coral); Transliteration: "Wōku Disu Wei" (Japanese: ウォーク・ディス・ウェイ)	"Walk This Way" by Aerosmith	Shō Aikawa	May 4, 2012	October 29, 2013
With renewed resolve to protect Iwato Jima, Ao takes on the G-Monster with some help from Team Pied Piper. In the aftermath, Ao begins to learn that the world is more complex than he realized. Flying to the world's largest Plant Coral in Okinawa, Ao meets up with Naru and Ivica Tanović, the chief of Team Pied Piper, who tells him about Eureka's disappearance. In hopes of finding his mother and learn more about his birth, Ao decides to join Génération Bleu. The OVA Jungfrau no Hanabanatachi fits in the timeline after this episode.
5	"Tighten Up" (génération bleu); Transliteration: "Taitun Appu" (Japanese: タイトゥン・アップ)	"Tighten Up" by Archie Bell & the Drells	Shinichi Inotsume	May 11, 2012	November 5, 2013
While adjusting to the people and lifestyle in Génération Bleu, Ao begins to feel uncertain about why he joined them in the first place. Meanwhile, the smugglers meet with Christophe Blanc, president of Génération Bleu, who briefs them about the organization's purpose for studying the Scub Corals and fighting the Secrets. Team Goldilocks undergoes an operation, but they are soon under attack by a Secret disguised as a hurricane. Team Pied Piper are then dispatched to aid Team Goldilocks.
6	"Light My Fire" (noblesse oblige); Transliteration: "Raito Mai Faiā" (Japanese: ライト・マイ・ファイアー)	"Light My Fire" by the Doors	Shinichi Inotsume	May 18, 2012	November 12, 2013
When Team Pied Piper arrives, they find that Bruno Hans, leader of Team Goldilocks, sacrificed himself to save his companions. After retrieving the pilots and their IFOs, they return to confront the enemy Secret, leaving an exhausted Ao behind. After waking, Ao hears from Chloe McCaffrey, one of Goldilocks' pilots, about their battle with the Secret and comes up with a plan to defeat it. While Ao confronts the Secret, he is watched by an enigmatic figure, who takes an interest in him.
7	"No One Is Innocent" (bye bye angel); Transliteration: "Nō Wan Izu Inosento" (Japanese: ノー・ワン・イズ・イノセント)	"No One Is Innocent" by the Sex Pistols	Shō Aikawa	May 25, 2012	November 19, 2013
The stranger, who calls himself Truth, invades Génération Bleu's headquarters in search for the Nirvash. After having a confrontation with him, Ao is knocked unconscious and has a dream. In this dream, Truth disguises himself as Ao and takes Naru to see a Plant Coral, but when the real Ao finds them, Truth disappears with Naru, even after Ao tries to save her. After waking up three days later, Ao is informed that Truth was indeed at Iwato Jima and has kidnapped Naru.
8	"One Nation Under a Groove" (blue thunder); Transliteration: "Wan Neishon Andā A Gurūvu" (Japanese: ワン・ネイション・アンダー・ア・グルーヴ)	"One Nation Under a Groove" by Funkadelic	Hiroyuki Kawasaki	June 1, 2012	November 26, 2013
A Secret appears in the Republic of Faisal Arabia, but on behalf of its own interests, the United States government forces Génération Bleu to not engage it. Ao's comrade Fleur reveals to him the reason why she hates her father Christophe is because Christophe chose to save her from dying from a car accident instead of his wife five years ago. Ao manages to cheer her up and both return with renewed spirits to battle when they are finally authorized to confront the enemy.
9	"In the Dark We Live" (enemy below); Transliteration: "In Za Dāku Wī Rivu" (Japanese: イン・ザ・ダーク・ウィー・リヴ)	"In the Dark We Live" by Felix da Housecat	Naohiro Fukushima	June 8, 2012	December 3, 2013
Nakamura, an officer of the Japanese Defense Force, runs an experiment in Tokyo Bay trying to create an artificial Plant Coral. However, a Secret appears and starts wreaking havoc. Team Pied Piper is dispatched to the area, but when Ao is informed that protecting the city from the Secret is not their top priority, he leaves against orders to engage it.
10	"Release Your Self" (the pied piper of Hamelin); Transliteration: "Rirīsu Yua Serufu" (Japanese: リリース・ユア・セルフ)	Release Yourself by Graham Central Station	Hiroyuki Kawasaki	June 22, 2012	December 10, 2013
A Scub Burst appears in Phoenix, Arizona, and while Team Pied Piper is on standby waiting for an official authorization to intervene, Ao and Ivica go ahead to evaluate the situation. As they arrive, Ao meets Truth once more, holding a group of survivors hostage while the U.S. Army comes up with a different approach to confront the enemy Secret with disastrous consequences.
11	"Plateaux of Mirror" (mirror of the world); Transliteration: "Puratō Obu Mirā" (Japanese: プラトー・オブ・ミラー)	The Plateaux of Mirror by Harold Budd and Brian Eno	Shō Aikawa	June 29, 2012	December 17, 2013
Team Pied Piper returns from a mission in Australia, unaware that they have brought with them a sand-like substance that makes the child pilots have strong hallucinations. Meanwhile, the smugglers investigate the past of Ao's fellow pilot Elena just to discover that she is even more mysterious than they previously imagined, seeing that she resembles an indie rock star named Miller, who seems to be a spy for the American government.
12	"Step into a World" (heaven and earth); Transliteration: "Suteppu Intu A Wārudo" (Japanese: ステップ・イントゥ・ア・ワールド)	"Step into a World" by KRS-One	Shō Aikawa	July 6, 2012	December 24, 2013
Team Pied Piper goes to a Génération Bleu space station to deposit Quartz that has been collected to Team Harlequin. While there, a Secret attacks a Scub Coral that has materialized in low orbit, and Team Pied Piper is sent out to intervene. When Ao then manages to destroy the Scub Coral in orbit, it turns out to have the Gekko inside of it with the Nirvash Type0 piloted by none other than Eureka.
13	"She's a Rainbow" (moonlight ship); Transliteration: "Shīzu A Reinbō" (Japanese: シーズ・ア・レインボウ)	"She's a Rainbow" by the Rolling Stones	Shō Aikawa	July 13, 2012	December 31, 2013
On board the Gekko, Ao discovers that the Eureka before him is a past incarnation of her, from the time she was still pregnant. Soon, the ship is surrounded by the Japanese Armed Forces and Okinawan Allied Forces, all desperate to take possession of both the past Eureka and her Nirvash. While trying to figure out how to send Eureka back to her own time, Ao, Team Pied Piper and the smugglers are attacked by Truth.
14	"Starfire" (another truth); Transliteration: "Sutāfaiā" (Japanese: スターファイアー)	"Starfire" by DragonForce	Shō Aikawa	July 20, 2012	January 7, 2014
Despite Truth's intervention, Ao manages to return Eureka to her proper time. He then hears from her that the baby she is carrying is not a boy, but a girl, meaning Ao has an older sister. After returning home to find more about his sister, he learns from his grandfather Dr. Toshio Fukai that Naru reappeared, but upon reuniting with her, the Japanese government declares claim of Iwato Jima and blames Ao for the death of one of its officers, Endo.
15	"War Head" (humanoid secret); Transliteration: "Wō Heddo" (Japanese: ウォー・ヘッド)	"WAR HEAD" by Ryuichi Sakamoto	Shinichi Inotsume	July 27, 2012	January 14, 2014
Uneasy after his last encounter with Naru and Eureka's claim that the Secrets are not enemies, a sleep-deprived Ao is sortied along his team to confront a Secret which has appeared beside a Scub Coral that was mysteriously reactivated. Ao is shot down by the enemy and after waking up, he learns that the other Scub Coral around the world are being reactivated as well, putting Génération Bleu in a state of maximum alert to confront the multiple Secrets emerging near them.
16	"Guardians Hammer" (next phase); Transliteration: "Gādianzu Hanmā" (Japanese: ガーディアンズ・ハンマー)	"Guardians Hammer" by KAGAMI	Shinichi Inotsume; Shō Aikawa	August 17, 2012	January 21, 2014
Several countries join Génération Bleu's special Operation Polaris to lure all Secrets that have appeared around the world to a deserted area in the Arctic and destroy them. The plan goes well, until Truth interferes and changes its course above Norway's Plant Coral, and Ao takes the initiative to ensure that the operation ends with no civilian casualties. After disposing of the Secrets with his newfound weapon, the Quartz Gun, Ao learns that his actions has changed history and is the only one who realizes that.
17	"La Vie en rose" (Johannson's book); Transliteration: "Ra Vian Rōzu" (Japanese: ラ・ヴィアン・ローズ)	"La Vie en rose" by Édith Piaf	Shō Aikawa	August 24, 2012	January 28, 2014
Ao confirms that the members of Team Goldilocks are living ordinary lives as if they were never assembled at all. However, the public opinion starts turning against Génération Bleu and during an operation in the middle of the ocean, the Quartz Gun starts moving by itself. Han Juno concluded the book of Johannson, who believed the existence of another world, where their world human population is around half of its original number, Okinawa became an independent nation and the Soviet Union still exists in their realm. Ao confronts Truth and has a brief encounter with Eureka who reveals to him the reason for her disappearance.
18	"Don't Look Down" (third engine); Transliteration: "Donto Rukku Daun" (Japanese: ドント・ルック・ダウン)	"Don't Look Down" by David Bowie	Akiko Waba	August 31, 2012	February 4, 2014
To protect his comrades, Ao surrenders himself, the Nirvash, and the Quartz Gun to the U.S. Army. With the whole world in doubt regarding Génération Bleu's intentions, Fleur and Elena decide to launch an attack on the carrier where Ao is, being held by U.S. officer Nick Tanaka, in order to bring him back.
19	"Maybe Tomorrow" (the day); Transliteration: "Meibī Tumorō" (Japanese: メイビー・トゥモロー)	"Maybe Tomorrow" by the Jackson 5	Shō Aikawa	September 7, 2012	February 11, 2014
Furious upon hearing that he is actually a Secret who has lost his memories, Truth destroys Génération Bleu's space station among thousands of satellites around the globe. The Allied Forces blame Génération Bleu for the incident and launch an attack against them. Truth takes the opportunity to infiltrate the base and attempts to steal the Quartz Gun, but is stopped by Christophe, who sacrifices himself to allow Ao and Fleur to escape.
20	"Better Days Ahead" (last message); Transliteration: "Betā Deizu Aheddo" (Japanese: ベター・デイズ・アヘッド)	Better Days Ahead by Norman Brown	Shō Aikawa	September 14, 2012	February 18, 2014
After learning that both Elena and the members of Team Harlequin switched sides to join the Allied Forces, Ao and his friends manage to escape, taking the Quartz Gun with them. With nowhere to run, the remaining members of Team Pied Piper are contacted by the Japanese government offering them shelter and support according to a deal Christophe made with the Secrets before his death, in that Fleur is to be heir as the president of Génération Bleu.
21	"World 2 World" (rising sun); Transliteration: "Wārudo Tu Wārudo" (Japanese: ワールド・トゥ・ワールド)	World 2 World by Underground Resistance	Shinichi Inotsume	September 21, 2012	February 25, 2014
Team Pied Piper, the Japanese Government, and the Secrets join forces to prevent the Allied Forces from claiming the Scub Corals' Quartzes. While Naru rallies supporters for her cause of having the Plant Corals shut down, Elena joins the Allied IFO squad along with Maggie Kwan, but Eureka appears before them and makes Elena remember the truth about her origins from 1981 that she wanted so much to deny. Soon after, both are dispatched to fight Ao, and when he manages to finally dissuade Elena, what appears before them is Truth, now fused with an IFO.
22	"Galaxy 2 Galaxy" (coral carriers); Transliteration: "Gyarakushī Tu Gyarakushī" (Japanese: ギャラクシー・トゥ・ギャラクシー)	Galaxy 2 Galaxy by Underground Resistance	Shō Aikawa	September 28, 2012	March 4, 2014
Truth attacks Ao, who is rescued by Naru when she teleports him and the Nirvash to her side in Okinawa. Reunited once more, Ao and Naru discuss the situation when Team Harlequin appears and reveals that Truth's current form can kill all people infected by the Scub Corals who approach him. As he is the son of a Coralian, Ao should stay away from him. Regardless, Ao decides to join his companions against Truth. Meanwhile, back in Eureka's timeline, her husband Renton Thurston boards the original Nirvash in an attempt to rescue her.
23	"The Final Frontier" (Renton Thurston); Transliteration: "Za Fainaru Furontia" (Japanese: ザ・ファイナル・フロンティア)	The Final Frontier by Underground Resistance	Shō Aikawa	November 20, 2012	March 11, 2014
Truth and Ao fight for the Quartz Gun until it fires once more, erasing Truth and converting Ao's Nirvash into the Nirvash Neo. It also rewrites history once more to render it such that Génération Bleu defeated the Allied Forces including Naru. As Naru is being hospitalized, Ao witnesses the Nirvash Spec V3 coming from the pillar and encounters it, meeting his father Renton for the first time.
24	"The Door Into Summer"; Transliteration: "Natsu e no Tobira" (Japanese: 夏への扉)	Natsu e no Tobira (The Door Into Summer) by Tatsuro Yamashita	Shō Aikawa	November 20, 2012	March 18, 2014
After having a brief encounter with the phased-out Eureka, Renton sets with Ao to Iwato Jima where he thanks Toshio for taking care of his family and then decides to make use of the Quartz Gun to destroy the original Scub Coral at his timeline and prevent it from spreading itself throughout the dimensions. As Ao confronts him to stop it, he learns that surprisingly, Truth has not fully disappeared, but has become the Nirvash Neo's archetype instead. Ao also learned that his older sister, Iris Thurston, had died soon after she was born. He then decides to make use of the Quartz Gun's last shot to negate the Secrets' existence to change Eureka's fate and have her reunited with Renton. Because of this, Ao is transported to June 15, 2027 where he bids farewell to Truth.

== OVA/ONA ==
No.	Title	Musical reference	Written by	Original release date	English release
OVA	"The Flowers of Jungfrau"; Transliteration: "Yungufurau no Hanabanatachi" (Japanese: ユングフラウの花々たち)	-	Rina Anzai; Hiroko Kazui	September 20, 2012	
Team Pied Piper is assigned to take part in a special festival in Switzerland as part of Génération Bleu's public relations policy, but Fleur and Elena have Ao dress up as a girl much to his chagrin. At the festival, the trio find themselves running away from an insistent journalist until they are called back to confront a Secret that appears on the border of Italy. This OVA fits in the storyline between episode 4 and episode 5.
FINAL	"Lord Don't Slow Me Down" (one more time); Transliteration: "Rōdo Donto Surō Mī Daun" (Japanese: ロード・ドント・スロー・ミー・ダウンー)	Lord Don't Slow Me Down by Oasis	Shō Aikawa	January 10, 2017 (Part A); January 24, 2017 (Part B); January 31, 2017 (Part C); February 7, 2017 (Part D); March 2, 2017 (Part E)	
As a result of erasing the Okinawa Scub Coral, Ao is disconnected from reality. While he can freely travel anywhere and any time through the newly created timeline, he is incapable of physically interacting with the world outside of the Nirvash. Instead, he meets Naru, Ellen, Maggie, and Fleur in the past, helping them and giving them warnings about future events. His actions cause the formation of the new timeline's Génération Bleu, which seeks to rescue Ao and return him to reality. Under the direction of a now alive Christoph and adult Ellen, Fleur and the original Elena set out to intercept Ao over Iwato Island. Mistakenly thinking they are trying to attack him, Ao attempts to run away. Instead, Fleur and Elena fire weaponized Secrets, which eliminate the Scub Coral contamination around the Nirvash and restore it. Fully repaired, Truth instructs Ao to eject from the Nirvash, and flies off to continue traveling through time and space. Ao manages to safely land on Iwato Island, and becomes emotional when he discovers he can interact with the world normally again. He is then greeted by Fleur and Elena, who welcome him back.
