= Pacific State =

Pacific State may refer to:

- "Pacific State", an episode of the anime series Eureka Seven
- "Pacific State" (song), a song by British electronic music group 808 State
- One of the five Pacific States of the United States
