= Bing Ji Ling =

- Born: Quinn Lamont Luke
- Genres: soul, R&B, Rock, roots rock
- Occupations: Singer-songwriter, musician, producer, DJ
- Instruments: Vocals, guitar, keyboards, bass, drums
- Labels: Tummy Touch Records, Ubiquity Records, Lovemonk Records, Rush! Productions
- Website: bingjiling.com

Quinn Lamont Luke, also known as Bing Ji Ling (Chinese for "ice cream"), is a New York City-based producer/musician. Luke has released six full-length albums of original material as a solo artist, as well as numerous singles, collaborations, and remixes. He is a former member of Phenomenal Handclap Band.

== Biography ==
As well as Phenomenal Handclap Band, Luke has also been involved in several other collaborative projects. As Incarnations, Luke joined friends Bart Davenport and Daniel Collas, to create an organic and original album in 2 weeks at a remote studio in the south of Spain for Lovemonk Records. As Coppa, a duo composed of Luke and Groove Merchant's Chris Veltri, Luke has produced a series of 12-inch singles. As Q&A (formerly Expanding Head Band), an instrumental, psychedelic-dance music duo with Alexis Georgopoulos, Luke has releases on DFA Records, Smalltown Supersound, and Lo Recordings. Luke is also a constant member of Tommy Guerrero's group.

Luke has worked in a collaborative project with Paul "Mudd" Murphy under the name Paqua, on Murphy's Claremont 56 label out of London. Their album "Akaliko" was released in June 2014, and they toured Europe promoting it at places such as Glastonbury Festival (U.K.) and The Garden festival (Croatia).

In the Fall of 2014, Luke released a solo/acoustic/covers record, entitled "Sunshine For Your Mind."

In 2015 a 12" release of "See Me Through" and a Romanowski remix of "Thought Our Love Was Strong" on Coyote's Über label were released. Both songs were from previous Bing albums. A Lexx remix of "Hangin' On A String," was released on his Phantom Island label. Other songs, such as Luke's collaboration with Cantoma (a.k.a. Phil Mison) "Alive," and his collaboration with Alex From Tokyo "Don't Move" were featured on various compilations.

The beginning of 2016 saw the release of a new collaboration with Alex from Tokyo, on his new World Famous label entitled "Not My Day." His version of Lil Louis' "Club Lonely" and a Tokyo Blackstar remix are also included. The late summer saw the first release under Bing's given name Quinn Lamont Luke on Aficionado Recordings and Tommy Guerrero's Too Good label, entitled "Temporadas." This release is Luke's first instrumental effort, with songs recorded at home, on a 4 track, one song per season. We also saw a new 12" release of and Idjut Boys remix of "Won't Wait For Yesterday," and a Tim "Love" Lee remix of "Everybody."

In the spring of 2017, Luke released a new single entitled "Different Aspriations."

== Discography ==
=== Albums ===
- "doodle loot doot doodle a doo" (2004)
- "Fire & Ice Cream" (2006)
- "June Degrees In December" (2008)
- "So Natural" (2009)
- "Shadow To Shine" (2011)
- "Por Cada Nube..." (2013)
- "Sunshine For Your Mind" (2014)

== General references ==
- My Spoonful (2011). Retrieved November 17, 2011, from https://web.archive.org/web/20111206223046/http://myspoonful.com/bing-ji-ling
- Rolling Stone (2013)
