= The Garden Festival =

Annual dance music festival held in Šibenik, Croatia

- Genre: Dance
- Dates: July
- Locations: Tisno, Croatia
- Years active: 2006 – present
- Founders: Nick & Charlotte Colgan, Eddie and Gail O’Callaghan
- Website: www.thegardenfestival.eu

The Garden festival is an annual summer dance music festival held in the area around Šibenik, Croatia each July. Started in 2006, the festival is held outdoors on the beach-front terrace, contributing to the open and relaxed party atmosphere that has become synonymous with the festival.

== 2006 festival ==
Live acts included: Alice Russell, Bass Culture, Dub Specimen, Eddy meets Yannah, Overproof, Reel People, The Beat Fleet, Different Drummer, Montefiori Cocktail and Alice McLaughlin.

== 2007 festival ==
Live acts included: 6IX TOY'S, Alice McLaughlin, Crazy P, Cubismo, Diesler, No Fakin DJs, Overproof Sound System, Postolar Tripper, Soil and Pimp Sessions and Yesking.
