= Postolar Tripper =

Hip hop-ethno-ska-reggae band from Zadar, Croatia

- Origin: Zadar, Croatia
- Genres: hip hop; ethno; ska; reggae
- Years active: 2002–2017
- Labels: Menart Records
- Members: Davor Valčić; Darko Predragović-Dabi; Renato Babić; Pave Ruić; Ivan Bačinić-Bačko; Dinko Habuš
- Website: postolar-tripper.com (in Croatian)

Postolar Tripper was a hip hop-ethno-ska-reggae band from Zadar, Croatia. It consists of band members:

- Davor Valčić - vocal
- Darko Predragović-Dabi – vocal
- Renato Babić – guitar
- Pave Ruić – bass guitar
- Ivan Bačinić-Bačko – percussion
- Dinko Habuš – trumpet
- Goran Šućurović–Macko – drums
- Zvonko Ćoso - Management

They first appeared on the music scene by posting their song "Aaaaaaaaa.!?" on the 057 radio station from Zadar in 2002. The song "Tužna priča o selu" followed, confirming the band's hip-hop/ethno style (speaking in the rural dialect of Dalmatia's Ravni kotari better known as "Zaleđe"). This song was No. 1 in the charts of HTV's teen show Briljanteen for months in 2005.

Their third single was "Balada o Viliju i Vesni", for which a video was made by video artist Mara Milin, after which their debut album was released. Humour and eccentric usage of the rural elements in their music was also a characteristic of their fourth single, "Čuvaj se sinjske ruke", also used in the film of the same name, by Bore Lee.

A duet in the beginning, Postolar Tripper became a band of eight musicians. Their album Popravni was released in 2008, with single "Na rubu ponora" recorded in ska/reggae style.

Postolar Tripper disbanded in 2017.

== Discography ==
- Sve što iman san ukra (2005, Menart Records)
1. "Intro... uzavrela atmosfera - skit"
2. "Vuci, vile i balave sopile"
3. "Metuzalemska"
4. "Drukanje - skit"
5. "Sve što iman san ukra"
6. "Superdeka"
7. "Brackanova žienska"
8. "Diskografija i - skit"
9. "Ljubio se bijeli golub" feat. Lidija Bajuk
10. "Uvod u baladu - skit"
11. "Balada o viliju i vesni"
12. "Patlidžani & češnjaci (štorija Dubravka Mataković)"
13. "Prijatelj iz bosanskog grahova"
14. "Čuvaj se sinjske ruke"
15. "Tužna priča o selu"
16. "Debela"
- Zamisli Zivot u Ritmu Cipela za Ples (2007)
1. "Brackanova žienska"
2. "Fa - Fa"
3. "Natasa"
4. "Ena"
5. "Obicna Ljubavna Pjesma" feat. Shot
6. "Andjeli nas zovu da im skinemo krila"
7. "Zamisli Zivot u Ritmu Muzike za Ples"
8. "Jamo Rasta"
9. "Mali Motorin"
10. "Sretno Dijete"
- Popravni (2008, Menart Records)
1. "Ona Za Ribara Neće"
2. "Brate brate gospođo"
3. "Gradelada"
4. "Kolcem priko škine - skit "
5. "Marijana"
6. "Palma U Pitaru"
7. "Pobro"
8. "Na Rubu Ponora"
9. "Pejstejšn dva - skit"
10. "Disko Taliban"
11. "Soren I Sam"
12. "Čudo"
- Čujem ja netko šuti (2012)
1. "Kruva bez motike"
2. "Burza rada"
3. "Zorane, vrati se kući"
4. "Moga konja"
5. "Loše društvo i labilan karakter"
6. "Tabletoman"
7. "Problem, reakcija, rješenje"
8. "Ska, ska, ska!"
9. "Trieste"
10. "Gaeta (feat. Libar)"
11. "Na kolodvoru"
12. "Largo"
13. "Uno, due, tre..."
14. "Redar Zeljko (feat. Zebrax) - bonus track"
