= Shadow to Shine =

2011 album by Bing Ji Ling

Shadow To Shine

Studio album by Bing Ji Ling
- Released: March 2011
- Genres: Rock, Soul
- Length: 38:25
- Label: Tummy Touch Records
- Producer: Embassy Sound Productions

Shadow To Shine is a solo album from Bing Ji Ling. It was released in March 2011 by Tummy Touch Records. Having co- produced, written, recorded and performed two full-length records, an EP, and a slew of singles, Bing Ji Ling decided to work with outside producers for the first time. The album was produced by Embassy Sound Productions (Sean Marquand and Daniel Collas of Phenomenal Handclap Band). Shadow To Shine also features other musicians such as Sharon Jones & The Dap-Kings, Scissor Sisters, Antibalas and Phenomenal Handclap Band.

== Track listing ==
No.	Title	Length
1.	"Move On"	2:56
2.	"Bye Bye"	3:46
3.	"Hold Tight"	4:02
4.	"Sunshine Love"	4:05
5.	"A Little Love"	3:21
6.	"Interlude / Welcome"	1:04
7.	"Like We Used To Do"	2:33
8.	"Hypnotized"	3:42
9.	"Dreamin"	5:57
10.	"Some Things Never Change"	3:20
11.	"Where Am I Gonna Go"	3:46

== Credits ==
Musicians on all tracks, except where noted:

- Lead vocals: Bing Ji Ling
- Drums: Patrick Wood
- Guitars and Bass: Luke O'Malley
- Keyboard instruments: Daniel Collas
- Congas: Paddy Boom
- Background vocals: Bing Ji Ling, Patrick Wood, Luke O'malley
- Trumpet : Dave Guy
- Tenor and Baritone Saxophone: Leon Michels
- Tambourine, cowbell, jawbone, ago go: Daniel Collás
- Flute: Rodrigão Ursaia
- Strings: Carolyn Pook and the Chanel Strings
- Horn and string arrangements: Daniel Collás
