= Bore Lee =

Croatian filmmaker and actor

Boris Ivković (born c. 1964), better known by his stage name Bore Lee, is a Croatian martial arts enthusiast, amateur filmmaker and actor from Sinj.

A textile technician by trade and a great fan of Bruce Lee, he studied martial arts from an early age. In 1994 he began displaying his skills on short low budget martial arts films that were recorded on a VHS camera. Gradually, those films became underground sensations in his native town of Sinj and the shooting of these films on city streets became a popular spectacle.

Bore Lee's fame reached Zagreb upon the release of U Kandžama Velegrada ("In the Claws of the Big Z") in 2004, a low budget martial arts parody that later turned out to be the most popular trash film in Croatian cinema, directed by filmmakers Mario Kovač, Krešimir Pauk, Ivan Ramljak and Andy Kuljiš.

In 2005, once again with the same 4 filmmakers and this time with a slightly better low budget, Bore Lee appeared in his 8th film titled "Čuvaj se Sinjske Ruke!" ("Deadly Sinjs!").

== Filmography ==
- U kandžama orla (In the Claws of the Eagle) (1993)
- Smrtonosna igra (Lethal Game) (1999)
- Rušilački udarci (2000)
- Otrovne ruke (2001)
- Vrijeme velikog obračuna (2002)
- Jači od bande (Stronger than the Gang) (2003)
- U kandzama velegrada (In the Claws of the Big Z) (2003)
- Čuvaj se Sinjske Ruke! (Deadly Sinjs) (2004)
- Sravnjeni sa zemljom (2005)
- Otok razvrata i zla (2005)
- Borilica (2007; educational documentary)
- Zlatne čaklje (2007)
- Maskirani pljačkaš (2009)
