= List of Eureka Seven characters =

The main cast of Eureka Seven (minus Eureka)

The Eureka Seven anime and manga series features an extensive cast of characters created by Bones. The central protagonist of the series is Renton Thurston, a young boy who joins the renegade group Gekkostate to fight against the U.F. Force, led by Dewey Novak.

In naming the characters, writer Dai Sato drew inspiration from club bands and the music culture of his generation. He said, "The youngest generation is represented by references to dance music, techno, and house. Hip hop represents the next generation, and rock represents the oldest generation." Although the show is primarily targeted towards the kid demographic, he hoped to draw in some viewers who might have hung out at clubs at night.

== Gekkostate ==
Gekkostate is an anti-government militia and counterculture collective led by Holland, who also pilots the LFO Terminus typeR909. Eureka, an aloof, pale girl, pilots an LFO called the Nirvash typeZERO. After joining Gekkostate early in the series, Renton co-pilots the Nirvash with Eureka. Stoner is a photographer who writes Gekkostate's illegal magazine, ray=out. Talho is the head pilot of Gekkostate's aircraft, the Gekko (月光号, Gekkō-gō; lit. "moonlight"; "Moonlight" in the English manga) and also ray=out's covergirl. Hap is Holland's childhood friend and the second-in-command of the Gekko. Ken-Goh is the weapons specialist and owner of the Gekko. Jobs and Woz are the ship's engineers, for hardware and software, respectively. Mischa is the resident doctor. Moondoggie is a secondary pilot and operator of the launch catapult. Hilda and Matthieu are the pilots of the Gekkostate LFOs Terminus typeR808 and Terminus typeR606, respectively. Gidget is the communications operator. Finally, Gonzy is a fortuneteller.

=== Renton Thurston ===
Voiced by: Yuko Sanpei, Keiji Fujiwara (adult) (Japanese); Johnny Yong Bosch (English)

Renton Thurston (レントン・サーストン, Renton Sāsuton) is the main protagonist of Eureka Seven. He is the son of Adrock Thurston and co-pilot (later pilot) of the Nirvash TypeZERO. He is named after Mark Renton, a character from the film Trainspotting, and Thurston Moore, guitarist of Sonic Youth.

Early in Eureka Seven, he immediately falls in love with Eureka and joins Gekkostate to follow Holland Novak, his idol, and also to be with Eureka. He grows into a responsible adult as the series progresses. He also goes on to become a hero by uniting the humans and Scub Coral and saving the world with Eureka. In Eureka Seven: AO, he is married to Eureka and has a son named Ao and a daughter named Amber. He is a mechanic genius and becomes famous after creating the first IFO in Eureka Seven: AO.

In the timeline of the Hi-Evolution films, Renton was accidentally killed by Eureka when her powers awakened, leading to her going insane with grief and creating dream worlds in a desperate quest to find him. At the conclusion of the second film, he is seen on an unknown planet, calling out to Eureka through the Nirvash. In the third film, he is revealed to be trapped within the Scub Coral and has interacted with Iris McKenzie there, with Iris considering him a big brother. Renton reunites with Eureka inside Nirvash when she calls out for his help stopping Dewey's refugee ship from impacting Earth. They disappear together after doing so, promising each other that they can now go anywhere they wish.

Yuri Lowenthal had at one point been contracted by Bandai to provide the English voice for Renton, but after recording thirteen episodes he was replaced by Johnny Yong Bosch because the director of the English dub felt that his voice was too low for the character. All of Renton's lines were subsequently rerecorded for consistency (although Yuri Lowenthal can still be heard as Renton when Holland is watching a video at the end of episode 7), though Bosch himself admits it took him a while to nail down the voice.

Theron Martin of Anime News Network stated in his review of the series' first DVD that "Renton is a pretty normal male lead for a series like this." However, while initially describing him as immature, Martin later said in his review of the seventh DVD that "Renton proves that he has grown up a bit by not being thrown for a loop by learning what makes Eureka special."

=== Eureka ===
Voiced by: Kaori Nazuka (Japanese); Stephanie Sheh (English)

Eureka (エウレカ;, pronounced [eɯɾeka]) is a young Coralian in human form, who is sent by the sentient Scub Coral to understand and communicate with humans before the beginning of the series. She is the pilot of the Nirvash typeZERO. Although she is the female protagonist of Eureka Seven, she also becomes the mother to the main protagonist of Eureka Seven: AO. Throughout the course of the series, she undergoes many physical changes and suffers from identity problems.

In Eureka Seven, she is at first considered to be Holland Novak's partner. However, upon meeting Renton Thurston when she crash-lands in his hometown, she realizes that he is actually the one who will make her smile and declares him as her partner. She later develops a romantic relationship with Renton. In Eureka Seven: AO, Eureka has married Renton and has a daughter named Amber and a son named Ao.

The Hi-Evolution films recontextualize the previous installments of the franchise as among more than 7,400 dream worlds created by a grieving Eureka after she accidentally killed Renton in an earlier timeline. In this capacity she is the main antagonist of the second film, but is saved from her madness by Anemone and brought to the real world. Eureka is the main protagonist of the third film, set ten years later. By this point she has adopted Thurston as her surname. Seeking redemption, she joins A.C.I.D. and works to protect a new humanoid Coralian named Iris, who has powers similar to those Eureka once possessed, from Dewey. She and Renton are finally reunited inside Nirvash when she calls out to him for help thwarting Dewey's apocalyptic scheme, and disappears with him afterward, with the promise that they are now free to go wherever they wish.

Eureka was ranked 18th in the female character category of the Anime Grand Prix in 2005.

In his review of the series' first DVD, Theron Martin of Anime News Network described Eureka as "calm, sensible, and soft-spoken but not necessarily shy...and is quite capable of showing joy, sadness, or earnestness without resorting to the exaggerated expressions and reactions so common in anime." Martin also said in his review of the sixth DVD that "Eureka is hardly the first person in an anime series who struggles to understand and cope with...love, but she does it more convincingly than most."

=== Maurice, Maeter and Linck ===
- Maurice: Voiced by: Michiko Neya (Japanese); Mary Elizabeth McGlynn (English)
- Maeter: Voiced by: Eriko Kigawa (Japanese); Peggy O'Neal (English)
- Linck: Voiced by: Fumie Mizusawa (Japanese); Kate Higgins (English)

Maurice (モーリス, Mōrisu), Maeter (メーテル, Mēteru), and Linck (リンク, Rinku) (collectively named after the author Maurice Maeterlinck) are three orphans adopted by Eureka. Before the beginning of the series, they are discovered under a pile of corpses during the massacre at Ciudades del Cielo. They soon join the Gekkostate and are adopted by Eureka. When they first meet Renton, they often play practical jokes on him and were opposed to his relationship with Eureka, whom they think of as their mother. But they eventually accept Renton as their adoptive father.

=== Holland Novak ===
Voiced by: Keiji Fujiwara, Toshiyuki Morikawa (Hi-Evolution series) (Japanese); Crispin Freeman (English)

Holland Novak (ホランド・ノヴァク, Horando Novaku) is the leader of Gekkostate, captain of the Gekko (Moonlight in the manga) and pilot of the LFO Terminus typeR909. He is also the brother of Dewey Novak. Before meeting Renton, he rescues Eureka and finds out from Norb that there will be a partner who will make Eureka smile. Holland eventually mutinies and organizes the Gekkostate. When he meets Renton, Holland develops a rivalry with the boy due to Renton getting more of Eureka's attention. Eventually, he reconciles with Renton after realizing that the boy is, in fact, Eureka's partner, thus fulfilling Norb's prophecy. During the series, he is also in a relationship with Talho.

In Pocketful of Rainbows, Holland is one of a number of orphans afflicted with rapid aging due to Dewey Sorenstam's experiments. He is not related to Dewey, who he killed before assuming "Holland Novak" as his identity. He seeks a way to go to "Neverland", a world where he can escape his fate, after glimpsing the alternate universe from Psalms of Planets. However, when he learns that his child with Talho will not share their condition, he relents, content to know the next generation will get to live full lives.

At the end of the second Hi-Evolution film, Holland and the rest of Gekkostate are brought into the real world. Ten years later, he is an officer in the military of "Green Earth", the people who came from the fictional world along with him. When Dewey betrays humanity, Holland launches a new Gekko to stop him. He orders the crew to abandon ship and sacrifices himself to try and knock the refugee ship off of its collision course with Earth, but this fails to achieve full success. He is survived by Talho and their as yet unborn son.

=== Talho Yūki ===
Voiced by: Michiko Neya (Japanese); Kate Higgins (English)

Talho Yūki (タルホ・ユーキ, Taruho Yūki) is the main helmsman of the Gekko and Holland Novak's girlfriend. She meets Holland and Dewey when the three of them served together in the military and initially worked in the Information Bureau before being demoted to a spy later on. She is at first jealous of Eureka due to her gaining her attention with Holland. She befriends Renton aboard the Gekkostate and stops being jealous when Holland professes his love for her during the course of the series. Eventually, she becomes pregnant with Holland's child and surrenders her position as the head pilot to Moondoggie in order to execute her final field mission. While Holland becomes a LFO pilot, she takes his place as the captain of the Gekko.

=== Matthieu ===
Voiced by: Akio Nakamura (Japanese); Kirk Thornton (English)

Matthieu (マシュー, Mashū) is the easygoing, afro-haired pilot of the Terminus typeR606 who has a passion for music, and seems to be constantly bored. Matthieu gathers information from and maintains contacts with ref boarders and disc jockeys. Matthieu and Hilda often act like husband and wife. Hilda orders Matthieu around as if he is her husband, and Matthieu treats Hilda as if she is his wife.

=== Hilda ===
Voiced by: Mayumi Asano (Japanese); Megan Hollingshead (English)

Hilda (ヒルダ, Hiruda) is the pilot of the Terminus typeR808 and Talho's best friend who keeps track of the Gekkostate's provisions and mechanical parts. In this capacity, she is generally in charge of the frequent trips to cities to replenish the organization's supplies. She also takes care of Maurice, Linck, and Maeter, and is shown to be very good at cooking. Hilda also has a close relationship with Matthieu.

=== Stoner ===
Voiced by: Yasunori Matsumoto (Japanese); Doug Stone (English)

Stoner (ストナー, Sutonā) is the photographer and journalist for ray=out, an underground lifter-culture periodical magazine where he denounces the military's crimes and depicts the daily life of the Gekkostate members to their fans around the world. Stoner is a pacifist and often rides with Matthieu. Stoner is given to expounding on his philosophical ideas at any time and place, including those which may be least appropriate, such as from the back seat of the 606 in the middle of LFO combat. He also likes to take photos mid-flight, and often requests Matthieu fly in such a way as to make his pictures come out perfectly, in spite of the situation. He is based on Che Guevara.

=== Ken-Goh ===
Voiced by: Tamio Ōki (Japanese); Bob Papenbrook (episodes 1-28), Kyle Hebert (episodes 29-50, film) (English)

Ken-Goh (ケンゴー, Kengō) is both the owner and the chief gunner of the Gekko. Not much was known about his history with Holland, but dialogue implies that he had something to do with the building of or security on board the Gekko. He once stated that "[he] would not have let [Holland] have the Gekko if [he was]...", cutting off his statement before actually revealing the reason. His marksmanship skills are exceptional and his aim is legendary among the other crew members. Holland refers to him as "Maestro" from time to time. He also enjoys painting and his works are often seen in ray=out.

=== Micha ===
Voiced by: Yōko Sōmi (Japanese); Mary Elizabeth McGlynn (English)

Micha (ミーシャ, Mīsha) is the Gekkostate's doctor. Before the beginning of the series, she is a military scientist specializing in studying Eureka and the Nirvash. However, she leaves the military to join the Gekkostate. On the ship, Micha often reminds Talho Yūki and Holland Novak on how to keep the Gekkostate from being dissolved.

=== Gonzy ===
Voiced by: Takko Ishimori (Japanese); Tony Oliver (English)

Not much is known about Gonzy (ゴンジイ, Gonjii), but he has a habit of unexpectedly appearing nearby whenever anyone is troubled, usually sitting on a carpet and calmly drinking tea. He often invites whoever is nearby to have tea with him. Gonzy was originally a stowaway aboard the Gekko, but was allowed to stay in part because the others respect his abilities at fortune-telling.

Though not a priest of Vodarac, he gives the image of a spiritualistic man. He's known to give out information out of the blue when it is most needed. When the crew went into a health craze, most of the members followed Gonzy doing various exercises to maintain health such as tai chi and eating healthy foods. It wasn't until towards near the end when the Gekkostate members wondered the fate of their world that Gonzy explains that the event they are witnessing is the "Second Summer of Love".

When Gonzy reveals that he knows about the Second Summer of Love, he opens both of his eyes (concealed under his thick eyebrows during the entire series) revealing the purple eyes of a human-form Coralian. Just as Holland and the crew realize the truth, Gonzy thanks them for a good time and disappears, leaving his clothing behind. He does not seem meant for the "blank slate" as Sakuya and Eureka, but rather as an educated observer. It is unknown when or how Gonzy presumably communicated with the Scub Coral, or if he communicates only after his disappearance, but given his likely position and so influence as observer, it is very possible that he was partly responsible for the Command Cluster's decision to trust humanity (namely Eureka, Renton, and those fighting at their side) with, essentially, the saving of all life on the planet.

In the fourth manga book of the series he was revealed by Holland to be a former elder (as opposed to sage as is used in the anime), and, in addition to this, Holland calls him Gon Karmapa.

=== Jobs ===
Voiced by: Tomoyuki Shimura (Japanese); Dave Mallow (English)

Living up to his name, Jobs (ジョブズ, Jobuzu) does the random jobs on the Gekko and also manages the majority of the hardware aboard the Gekko. Primarily, he's Gekko's engineer and often is found around the core systems room when the ship requires extra attention in powered flights or battles. He is always immaculately dressed in a shirt, vest, and tie. He also has a calm, expert bearing, but he occasionally lets these mannerisms slip when something is mentioned that particularly excites him. Like Gonzy, he was originally a stowaway, but allowed to stay because of his talents. He admires "Dr. "Bear", as seen in episode 31, and is a huge fan of Dr. Bear's research and engineering theories. He is modeled after Steve Jobs (hence, "Jobs"), one of the co-founders of Apple.

=== Woz ===
Voiced by: Chō (Japanese); Dave Wittenberg (English)

Woz (ウォズ, Wozu) is sometimes called "Woz the Whiz". He is the ship's hacker and maintains the ship's software. He and Jobs were originally stowaways aboard the Gekko, but they were invited to stay because of their technical skills. He and Jobs tend to argue over how best to configure the Gekko's systems, since Woz insists on rewriting the control systems to compensate for every modification Jobs makes while Jobs asserts that the software is fully capable of supporting the changes. His hippy attitude and grunge attire are a deep contrast to Jobs, but they seem to maintain a strong friendship anyway. He is modeled after Steve Wozniak (hence, "Woz"), another of Apple's co-founders. In the third Hi-Evolution film, Woz has a small role and is given the full name Woz Niak, again based on Wozniak.

=== Hap ===
Voiced by: Taro Yamaguchi (Japanese); Tony Oliver (English)

Hap (ハップ, Happu) is the second-in-command, handles Gekkostate's finances, and manages information (not to be confused with Gidget's position of communications). While on the bridge in action, Hap's job is to monitor trapar levels, though he is also there frequently at night trying to obtain intel on matters crucial to the Gekkostate. He is also one of Holland's childhood buddies (since they were three years old, he asserts), and played a key role in convincing Holland and his SOF team to desert. He gained his nickname from his ever-present "happy smile". Hap is very parsimonious when it comes to spending money and is also notably nonathletic.

=== Gidget ===
Voiced by: Fumie Mizusawa (Japanese); Jessica Straus (English)

Gidget (ギジェット, Gijetto) is a young woman who serves as the sensor and communications officer of the Gekkostate. Her role is considered secondary and often she's featured relaying tactical data to crew or talking about relationship issues with Eureka. She is in a romantic relationship with Moondoggie. She is based on the titular character of the Gidget franchise.

=== Moondoggie ===
Voiced by: Mamoru Miyano (Japanese); Steve Staley (English)

Moondoggie (ムーンドギー, Mūndogī) is the second-newest member of the Gekkostate (the newest being Renton). He is initially in charge of the LFO catapult systems and launch pads on board the Gekko, but later he becomes the ship's helmsman, replacing Talho when she has to leave the post, as he is the group's only other licensed pilot, it is also revealed that his real name is James Darren Emerson. Moondoggie often has confidence issues when comparing himself to the other members of Gekkostate concerning his usefulness and importance as a member of the team, this is the main reason he volunteered to replace Talho at the helm of the Gekko. He is based on a character from the Gidget movies, TV shows, and novel. The original Doggie was the boyfriend of the original Gidget and was a committed surf bum.

== U.F. Force ==
The U.F. Force is a military unit under the command of the Sage Council (or The Council of the Wise), the main authority of the United Federation of Predgio Towers. Serving under the Sage Council is Lieutenant Colonel Dewey Novak, who directed a special operations force called the SOF prior to his imprisonment at the beginning of the series. Dominic Sorel is an intelligence officer under Novak and the chief handler of Anemone, who pilots the LFO Nirvash type theEND.

=== Anemone ===
Voiced by: Ami Koshimizu, Yoshiko Sakakibara (old) (Japanese); Kari Wahlgren (English)

Anemone (アネモネ) is the pilot of the Nirvash LFO, typeTheEND. Introduced as Dewey Novak's henchwoman and assassin, she is a human who becomes an experimental subject to turn her into a Coralian. She is envious of Eureka as well as the Nirvash typeZERO. Eventually, after being defeated numerous times by the Gekkostate and upon realizing Dewey's own actions, she betrays him for the Gekkostate. She later falls in love with her caretaker Dominic after saving him from certain death, having been convinced by Renton and Eureka to show her feelings for him.

In Pocketful of Rainbows, an elderly Anemone appears as a Coralian priestess in an alternate universe. At the end of the film, she returns to her original appearance and reunites with Dominic.

A reimagined version of Anemone serves as a major protagonist in the Hi-Evolution trilogy. The second film introduces her as "Anemone" Fuuka Ishii, the daughter of United Nations soldier Ken Ishii. Years after Ken's demise in battle against the "Eureka Seven" monster laying waste to the world, Anemone is enlisted by the anti-Scub unit A.C.I.D. to continue his fight. She is tasked with using a device left by Ken to dive into the fictional world inside Eureka Seven, which places her in the body of her counterpart from Psalms of Planets at various points where she fought the Nirvash. After several victories and disturbing encounters with both Dewey and Eureka, she resolves to save Eureka and brings her into the real world.

In the third film, set ten years later, Anemone is a high-ranking A.C.I.D. official and captain of her own ship, the Buena Vista. She is Eureka's only friend and works closely with her on a mission to protect Iris McKenzie from Dewey's forces.

In its review of the series' second DVD, Anime News Network criticized Anemone's character design, calling it "silly and too-angular", but "a good match for her personality." The site also said in its review of the third DVD that "Anemone is a great, though not likeable, addition as a character whose attitude is as sharp-edged as her appearance but far more troubled and rotten." Her name and personality is a possible reference to a Sea anemone.

=== Dominic Sorel ===
Voiced by: Shigenori Yamazaki (Japanese); Peter Doyle (English)

Dominic Sorel (ドミニク・ソレル, Dominiku Soreru) is the youngest to be a second lieutenant and Dewey's subordinate. He is assigned to Anemone to tend to her needs and monitor her physical and mental condition. It is never explained why Dominic was promoted so fast, especially given his occasional naivete. There are men in the military far older than he is and yet of much lower rank, who often have trouble obeying his orders. Dominic is also aware that commanding officers give him a hard time following his orders for Dewey as they think he's still a kid.

Dominic is mainly a field officer, constantly working on investigations and field missions for Dewey. If he's not on the ground investigating or on covert missions, he's in the air tending to Anemone. At one point, Dominic was ordered to investigate Renton's grandfather. Seeing how the Thurstons tend to have an effect on the world, Dewey wanted to gather more information from Renton's grandfather. After crashing his motorcycle, Dominic spent a day with Renton's grandpa and got to know him. After staying over the night to get his bike fixed, Renton's grandfather spoke to Dominic in a moving way to look after Renton like family, saying he considers Dominic family as well. Dominic decides not to report the incident, but it is anyway, as Dewey had men watching Dominic's movements. Dewey never seems concerned about this fact, or Dominic's somewhat overt distaste for Dewey's methods, and in fact seems to consider Dominic to be a harmless but occasionally useful tool that can be safely ignored.

Eventually, Dominic turns away from Dewey after witnessing the sick human experiments used to create girls like Anemone. He joins up with the crew of the Super Izumo and Gekkostate in an attempt to stop Dewey and rescue Anemone. Even though he acknowledges his love as one-sided, he goes out of his way to look out for Anemone. He even risks his life in an attempt to stop Anemone from interfering with Renton and Eureka, taking a small shuttle into a rapidly sealing hole that Anemone had used to reach them. Though unsuccessful, the act is enough to convince her to stop and for her to finally return his feelings. After "Second Summer of Love", they are seen camping next to Dominic's bike.

Dominic makes several brief appearances in TR2: New Vision, the events of which take place before the anime. He first shows up to tell 2nd Lieutenant Steven Bisson of Sumner and Moondoggie's connection to Gekkostate, and subtly chides him for losing track of Sumner in the first place. Toward the end of the game, he leads the military fleet that arrives to attack Thundercloud tower, which had, by then, fallen under the control of Steven's renegade forces. His final appearance is after the credits, in which he silently and stoically watches as a KLF squadron is dispatched to Bellforest, presumably to hunt down Eureka and the Nirvash at the beginning of the series.

A bit of a running gag in Eureka Seven is Dominic's inability to use and understand maps. Because of this, Renton calls Dominic a "genuine idiot" twice.

In the manga, Dominic dies shielding Renton from anti-body coralians as Renton tries to cure the Scub Coral of a disease TheEND injected into it.

In Pocketful of Rainbows, Dominic is Renton and Eureka's childhood professor, who dies several years before the film's events. Renton is later able to consult his spirit for advice, and Dominic's soul reunites with Anemone at the film's conclusion.

A reimagined version of Dominic is a major character in the second Hi-Evolution film. Here, he is portrayed as an "A.I. conceirge" program assisting Fuuka Ishii, the real-world version of Anemone. When Anemone enters the fictional world during the film, he manifests as the human Dominic. At the end of the film, he is brought into the real world. Despite this, he only makes a cameo appearance in the third film; however, Anemone is seen wearing a ring, suggesting their relationship has progressed.

Critics such as Don Houston of DVD Talk have noted the similarities between Dominic and Renton; Dominic cares for Anemone in much the same way that Renton does for Eureka. Later episodes "show an opponent of Renton studying his own complicity in the events unraveling before him".

=== Dewey Novak ===
Voiced by: Koji Tsujitani, Keiji Fujiwara (Anemone Hi-Evolution), Koichi Yamadera (Eureka Hi-Evolution) (Japanese); Kim Strauss (English)

Dewey Novak (デューイ・ノヴァク, Dyūi Novaku) is the main antagonist of Eureka Seven. Through a combination of charisma and brains, he seizes control of the U.F. as part of his bloodstained quest to rid the world of the Scub Coral.

As the former commander of the notorious SOF, Dewey distinguished himself by waging genocidal campaigns against the Vodarek people. However, his career came to a screeching halt when he was accused of helping his younger brother, Holland, defect from the military. This was apparently part of a concerted attempt by the Sage Council to shut down the remnants of Adroc Thurston's project.

By order of the government, Dewey is later released and promoted to colonel. He subsequently takes Dominic and Anemone under his command. In a complicated and carefully calculated plan, he undermines the public's faith in the Sage Council and overthrows them.

According to Dewey, the Novak family existed to calm the planet. The ritual to do so involved an act of patricide, an act that Dewey assumed was reserved for him. However, in an unforeseen turn of events, his mother died while giving birth to his younger brother, Holland. Consequently, the title of "Sacrificial King" was automatically passed on to his newborn sibling. With his ambitions of becoming the Novak family's next patriarch ruined, Dewey murdered his father in cold blood only to have the planet "reject" the ritual and his succession. With no legitimate heir, the other noble families seized the Novak family's assets and left Dewey and Holland homeless. As a result, Dewey bears a pathological hatred for his brother as well as the planet for denying him what he believed to be his birthright. However, the only account of this event is given by Dewey to Anemone. It is possible that parts of it might actually be a delusion he created. At the end of the series, Holland admits that he did not know how Dewey's madness came to be.

Dewey also bears a deep hatred for the Scub, and focuses his efforts on destroying it throughout the series. This hatred is such that by the end of the series, Dewey now sees the planet it absorbed as beyond redemption and comes to a final conclusion. To further that idea, during his final confrontation with Holland, Dewey revealed to his brother that he secretly had a Compac Drive embedded in his chest, much like Norb. His Compac Drive, however, is more like a dead man's switch which he claims binds him to the Earth itself. He states that the entire world will die with him.

Dewey foresaw that Eureka or Anemone would become the replacement Scub Coral command center in the event of the existing command center's destruction. As a result, he had special collars attached to both girls that would be activated upon his death (this is done before the events of the series). In the anime, his confrontation with Holland climaxes with Dewey shooting himself in the head to set his plan of planetary genocide in motion, while in the manga, Holland kills him in a duel. This results in the activation of the collars' self-destruct sequence that is meant to be relayed throughout the Scub Coral should either girl merge with it. Holland is found moments afterward with tears in his eyes confessing that he was "too late to save " Dewey, showing a rare moment of sympathy and love for his brother. He goes on in episode 50 to say that he will shoulder Dewey's "burden", even if it takes the rest of his life.

Dewey makes a posthumous appearance in the film Pocketful of Rainbows. He is renamed Dewey Sorenstam and is not related to Holland. Prior to the events of the film, he experimented on a group of orphan children, resulting in them aging rapidly. These orphans eventually killed him and went on to form the film's version of Gekkostate.

Dewey returns as the main antagonist of the Hi-Evolution film trilogy. After failing to stop the malfunction of the anti-Scub weapon "Silver Box" in the first film, which leads to the First Summer of Love, he is trapped in the cycle of dream worlds created by the grieving Eureka. Having absorbed Silver Box's power, he is the only one besides Eureka to be aware of this cycle. Eventually, he is ejected from the fictional world within the Eureka Seven into reality and imprisoned by the United Nations anti-Scub unit, A.C.I.D. A real-world version of Dr. Bear brings Fuuka Ishii, the real-world Anemone, to see him, but he simply ruminates on the nature of Eureka's power without providing much help. Later, as Anemone frees Eureka, Dewey declares the beginning of the "Millenium Age" and escapes from prison, revealing he possesses similar powers to Eureka's. He observes the descent of a new Nirvash, calling it the "holy guide to Nirvana."

In the third film, set ten years later, Dewey is appointed leader of the Green Earth Imperial Guard Cavalry, a special military unit composed of individuals from the fictional world, such as Charles, Ray and Endo. He orchestrates a bombing aboard the space station "Kibisis" to force it into a decaying orbit, and hunts down a new humanoid Coralian, Iris, to reach Nirvana. However, Eureka and A.C.I.D. reach Iris first, forcing Dewey to chase them across Europe. Once he captures Iris, Dewey reveals his true plan: having succumbed to despair over his origin as an artificial construct born in Eureka's fictional world, he intends to give his life meaning by killing himself in an apocalyptic, planet-sized Eureka event triggered by bringing Iris and the Nirvash/Silver Box hybrid aboard Kibisis into contact. When A.C.I.D. interrupts this plan, Dewey, who is dying after overusing his powers, initiates a failsafe by destroying a space elevator, killing millions below it and setting the refugee ship atop it on a collision course with the planet, intending to kill all of Green Earth with its descent before the impact kills millions more. Holland, Eureka and Renton sacrifice themselves to stop the ship, and Dewey dies, his crusade finally thwarted for good.

=== Council of the Sages ===
- Koda (コーダ, Kōda): Voiced by: Mariko Akashi (Japanese); Barbara Goodson (English)
- Braya (ブラヤ, Buraya): Voiced by: Mugihito (Japanese); Michael Forest (English)
- Kuzemi (クゼミ, Kuzemi): Voiced by: Tamio Ōki (Japanese); William Knight (English)

The Council of the Sages is the main authority in U.F., apparently located in the same starship that brought mankind to the planet or at what is known as the Capital. They were the few of those aware of the planet's true nature and hid it from the masses until Dewey exposed the "truth" to the public. From there, Dewey disbanded the sages, killing Braya and Kuzemi in the process. Koda, the remaining sage, handed power over to Dewey afterwards. It is unknown what happened to Koda after.

In the manga version, Dewey kills the three sages and takes power.

The sages also appear in the first film of the Hi-Evolution trilogy, overseeing the military's "Operation Necrosis" against the Command Cluster, which ends with the First Summer of Love. Koda is referenced as a Green Earth political leader in the third film, but does not make any on-screen appearances.

=== Ageha Squad ===
The Ageha Squad is an anti-Coralian unit created by Dewey, composed primarily of five specially trained children whom Dewey rescued from a refugee camp. Skilled, resourceful, and lethal, these five enjoy their work as children would. They are blissfully unconcerned about the immense number of people killed as a result of their efforts, and are only interested in Dewey's responses. It is revealed by Captain Jurgens in episode 50 that they were found by Colonel Dewey in Warsaw, victims of an ethnic cleansing.

=== Captain Jurgens ===
Voiced by: Tetsuo Komura (Japanese); Michael McConnohie (English)

Jurgens (ユルゲンス, Yurugensu) is the captain of the ship Izumo and a hardened soldier who survived the war which saw the death of his wife and two daughters. Jurgens is a loyal soldier, and initially follows his orders whether or not he agrees with them. He eventually finds his personal limit after reading the last issue of ray=out. He helps to spread Gekkostate's message by spreading the video of the meeting between Norb and Dr. Bear across every military channel, essentially informing the entire military. His efforts, however, only manage to secure the loyalty of his own ship. After that, he begins operating against Dewey and supports Gekkostate's action along with Dominic (although Dominic defected to Gekkostate, Jurgens did not).

He is seen along with Holland in the beginning of episode 50 talking about the Ageha Squad, and how he is thinking of taking care of them as redemption for his crimes making the world how it is (meaning blindly following orders up until he helps Gekkostate). It has been subtly hinted throughout the series that he has some feelings for or is in some kind of relationship with Maria Schneider.

=== Maria Schneider ===
Voiced by: Eriko Kigawa (Japanese); Peggy O'Neal (English)

Maria Schneider (マリア・シュナイダー, Maria Shunaidā) is the executive officer of the Izumo and trusted right-hand woman of Jurgens. At her computer station on the Izumo's bridge, her desktop wallpaper is a cartoon bunny wearing clothes. It has been subtly hinted throughout the series that she has some feelings for or is in some kind of relationship with Captain Jurgens.

=== Logica ===
Logica is a character who appears only in the manga. As a member of the SOF, he is a former colleague of Holland's and bears a strong resentment towards him for defecting. He is downed by Holland in an aerial battle and then later killed by Anemone's TheEnd. He piloted a standard black Terminus-505 LFO, the basic mech used by the SOF.

=== Yauchi ===
Yauchi is a character who appears only in the manga. He is a priest and a scientist who serves under Dewey Novak. Originally he believed that Dewey was the world's savior but was later proven wrong after witnessing his actions. During Dewey's final conflict with Holland aboard his ship, Yauchi betrays him and locks the two inside the bridge eventually leading to the deaths of Dewey and his control team.

=== Dr. Diamond ===
Dr. Diamond is a scientist who appears only in the manga. He studies the Nirvash's Amita Drive and wants to learn about the Coralians.

== Civilians ==
=== Axel Thurston ===
Voiced by: Takeshi Aono (Japanese); Steve Kramer (English)

Axel Thurston (アクセル・サーストン, Akuseru Sāsuton) is Renton's grandfather, Adroc's father, and a renowned technician who is responsible for Renton's on-the-job education in mechanical engineering. He initially opposed Renton's idea to join Gekkostate, but later he decided to let him go, because he thinks he should see the world for himself, and he also thinks, in the end, that Renton will come back to live with him. He was the one who gave the Amita Drive to Renton, and also created both versions of the typeZERO's ref boards.

=== Yucatán Iglasias ===
Voiced by: Yutaka Nakano (Japanese); John Snyder (English)

Yucatán Iglasias is Renton's uncle, who runs a produce farm in his childhood hometown of Controrado. He catches Renton, Matthieu, and Eureka when they try to steal a Pancha Fruit from his farm; the three are forced to make up stories about military service to keep him in the dark about Renton's involvement with Gekkostate. Renton is often annoyed by Yucatán's overly patriotic attitude, though he does not hold it against him. During Renton's visit in "Human Behaviour", the military was called in to apprehend his companions, but after they escaped, Yucatán was incarcerated in their place. He owns an M1 Garand battle rifle.

=== Charles Beams ===
Voiced by: Jūrōta Kosugi (Japanese); Patrick Seitz (English)

Charles Beams (チャールズ・ビームス, Chāruzu Bīmusu) is a freelance LFO pilot and mercenary, with his partner and wife Ray. The Beams are first hired by the military to retrieve Eureka and the Nirvash from them. Renton stays with Charles and his wife after leaving the Gekkostate, but Renton soon realizes his true intentions to capture Eureka and the Nirvash and returns to the Gekkostate as a result. Later, Charles is killed by Holland during a gun fight in the Gekko's hangar. His name is based on the designers Charles and Ray Eames.

Charles appears in the first Hi-Evolution film, in a similar capacity to his role in the original series. After he and Ray are brought to the real world at the end of the second film, he appears in the third as Dewey's right-hand man. Charles is shown to be a voice of some reason, though Dewey frequently does not listen to his concerns. He defects to A.C.I.D. following Dewey's betrayal and forgives Eureka for accidentally killing Renton.

=== Ray Beams ===
Voiced by: Aya Hisakawa (Japanese); Melissa Fahn (English)

Ray Beams (レイ・ビームス, Rei Bīmusu) is Charles' fighting partner and wife, and apparently served with him in the SOF. Before the beginning of the series, she becomes unable to bear children due to being in the blast radius of the Seven Swell that kickstarted the Summer of Love. When Renton temporarily joins Charles and Ray on the Swan, Ray immediately bonds with him. To her, Renton is the child she has never had and with his presence finally makes her feel like she has a true family. However, she is devastated to learn that Renton is not only Adroc Thurston's son but also a member of Gekkostate. She eventually realizes that Eureka is in love with him and causes her to develop a rivalry with the Coralian. After Charles's death drives Ray into madness, she attempts to destroy the Gekko in a kamikaze attack in the hopes of her, Renton, and Charles being able to reunite in the afterlife. However, she is killed by Holland when he destroys the Swan. As with Charles, Ray's name is based on the designers Charles and Ray Eames, however her name also serves as a pun for light rays or beams.

Like Charles, Ray fills a similar role in the first Hi-Evolution film, is brought to the real world in the second, and is a member of Dewey's unit in the third. She harbors an intense hatred of Eureka for killing Renton, to the point where she begs Dewey to let her be the one to execute Eureka. She and Charles are sent alongside Sumner Sturgeon and other soldiers to capture Iris, but when they do, Dewey betrays them with his plan for planetary genocide. Badly shaken by this, Ray manages to forgive Eureka, entrusting her with stopping Dewey. She and Charles are last seen mourning Eureka and Renton's shared sacrifice.

=== Tiptory ===
Voiced by: Kazuko Sugiyama (Japanese); Philece Sampler (English)

Tiptory (ティプトリー, Tiputorī) is a member of an anti-Federation indigenous religious group called Vodarac (specifically, the sect thereof that is loyal to Norb). She is introduced when Gekkostate made a deal with the military to capture her and turn her in for money, even though Gekkostate themselves are against the Federation. Though the attempt appears legitimate, it is actually a setup to prevent the Federation from capturing her directly. After presenting her as a captive and receiving their payment, Gekkostate rescues her. She is then dropped off at Ciudades del Cielo, the place of Vodarac's pilgrimage, and the place of Holland's darkest memories. She later shows up to greet Norb upon his return to the Vodarac homeland. She later appears throughout the series in small moments though there is rarely any dialogue.

=== Norb ===
Voiced by: Rikiya Koyama (Japanese); Jamieson Price (English)

Norb (ノルブ, Norubu) is a Vodarac priest. Before the beginning of the series, he convinces Holland leaving the SOF after Norb explains to him what Dewey is trying to do and the consequences it entails for the planet and humanity. During his childhood, he is given the task to be the guardian of what the Vodarac believed to be their messiah but is actually the first Coralian girl spawned by the Scub Coral. At first, Norb attempts to maintain the solemn duty of simply doing tasks for this being, or Sakuya, as she would later tell him, but later earns her affection after giving her a lotus flower. However, Sakuya is transformed into a giant lotus flower and Norb is left with a Compac Drive embedded into his chest that originally materialized from Sakuya's remains. The Compac Drive in his chest gives Norb strange powers. These powers included the ability to shut-off or disrupt other Compac Drives, manipulate Scub Coral and cause it to rise as barriers, and even manipulate Trapar energy to the point of using it as an offensive weapon.

=== Sakuya ===
Voiced by: Akiko Yajima (Japanese); Jennie Kwan (English)

Sakuya (サクヤ, Sakuya) is Eureka's predecessor, sporting lavender hair. Because she was a girl of mysterious power, the religious authority of Vodarac thought she was some sort of messiah and placed her in the central part of the temple. They banned any disciple from speaking to her, and allowed very few select disciples to care for her in a highly reverent, if sterile, manner.

For forty years since her initial appearance, she had no significant contact with anyone. This changes when Norb is assigned to care for her. Norb and Sakuya fell in love. Though they tried to keep it secret at first, a priest catches them embracing and assumes it to be a sign that Sakuya has chosen someone to travel to the Scub Coral with. They are hurriedly sent to cross the zone, but fail in the attempt. Both Sakuya and Norb suffer some sort of physical deformation but Sakuya is by far the most affected since she is turned into a giant lotus flower.

After her transformation, Sakuya erects a barrier around temple city, blocking out everything, including trapar (which is now poisonous to her). Norb eventually brings the Gekkostate to meet Sakuya, since her help is needed to get Renton and Eureka past the Great Wall successfully. Eureka meets with Sakuya in another reality in the form of a library. There they talk about what they learned and how Sakuya and Norb first met. After sending Eureka back, she and Norb stay in the temple to disable the barrier around it and use the energy to help Eureka and Renton pass through the Great Wall. For Sakuya and Norb, they were taken to the Zone where they could be together while Renton and Eureka discovered Earth.

=== Morita ===
Voiced by: Kenichi Ono (Japanese); Terrence Stone (English)

Morita (モリタ, Morita) is the head of the Tresor military research complex. He was one of the scientists who studied the first Archetype after its unearthing and worked on both versions of the Nirvash typeZERO. Morita is also acquainted with Axel Thurston through Axel's work on the first LFO ref board for the Nirvash. He also knows Holland, though in the past they don't get along well (for unstated reasons).

=== Dr. Greg "Bear" Egan ===
Voiced by: Banjou Ginga (Japanese); Joey Camen (English)

Nicknamed "Dr. Bear" for his physically huge body, Greg Bear Egan (グレッグ・ベア・イーガン, Gureggu Bea Īgan) is an iconoclastic scientist who was also part of the Tresor research team that initially studied Eureka and her relationship with the Nirvash. He was renowned as an "out-of-the-box" thinker capable of combining various theories into a workable gestalt. He was previously married to Mischa of Gekkostate, and tends to act as if they were still lovers – for instance, he calls her "My little cub" and "kuma-chan", the latter meaning "bear". His behaviour often prompts Mischa to take an even sterner tone than usual with him. He is fond of candy, often has a stash of it somewhere on his person, and once told Renton that the candy was part of an important memory in his relationship with Mischa.

Possessing many insights on the Scub Coral, the Coralians, LFOs, and Eureka, Bear is both stunned and overjoyed to learn that from a scientific viewpoint they were found to be almost identical to the Vodarac teachings of Norb; the similarities were revealed in a taped meeting aboard the Gekko. The underground video of this, along with the information published in Ray=Out became one of the main factors for many people, including some military leaders, to reject what Dewey's group was doing. His name references the science fiction writers Greg Bear and Greg Egan.

In the second and third Hi-Evolution films, Dr. Bear is a resident of the real world and a high-ranking member of the UN anti-Scub unit A.C.I.D., responsible for coordinating humanity's response to the Eureka phenomenon.

=== Dr. Sonia Wakabayashi ===
Voiced by: Yuriko Yamaguchi (Japanese); Bridget Hoffman (English)

Another of Tresor's scientists, Sonia Wakabayashi (ソニア・ワカバヤシ, Sonia Wakabayashi) formerly studied Eureka along with Mischa. While apparently a good friend to Eureka, she's rather high-strung, and not as adaptable to the Gekkostate lifestyle as Mischa is.

=== William B. "Will" Baxter ===
Voiced by: Toshio Furukawa (Japanese); Keith Silverstein (English)

William B. "Will" Baxter (ウィリアム・B・バクスター, Wiriamu Bī Bakusutā) is a young man who lives somewhat close to Gianas. He takes care of Renton during his return to the Gekkostate. He is a bit talkative, yet insightful and empathetic, preferring to work with nature rather than dominate it. He maintains a large vegetable garden that is almost impossible to navigate because of the tall grass growing with the crops. His garden thrives despite his dismantling of several huge pile bunkers that subdue tectonic movements. He lives with his wife and former engineer, Martha (マーサ, Māsa), a victim of Desperation Disease. He speaks to her even though she never answers him audibly. To him, her condition doesn't evoke despair in him, therefore she does not suffer from Desperation Disease. In the end (when the world appears to be ending), Martha (and all the others suffering from Desperation Disease) are miraculously cured. While William was outside tending to the garden, he turned around and saw Martha walking again. She smiled at him, and then a giant piece of shrapnel fell onto their house, killing them.

=== Sumner Sturgeon & Ruri ===
Though not having a role in the story, Sumner and Ruri are from the video games TR1: New Wave and New Vision and make a cameo appearance in episode 45, watching something launching into space; Ruri has the latest issue of ray=out in her pocket, and the two are apparently listening to a radio. The events surrounding Sumner take place a few years prior to that of the anime. They are also the main characters of the Eureka Seven: Gravity Boys and Lifting Girl prequel manga, which chronicles Sumner and Ruri's lives when they were Renton's age. They also appear in the final film of the Hi-Evolution trilogy.

==== Sumner Sturgeon ====
Voiced by: Hiro Shimono (Japanese); Sam Riegel (English)

Sumner Sturgeon (サムナ・スタージョン, Samuna Sutājon) is from the Sturgeon family, a prestigious family known for producing top-quality soldiers. His father, Bernard Sturgeon, is outspoken against the use of LFOs in the military, and is the first reason why he was recruited into New Wave Academy: to counter his father's actions. He possesses great skill in lifting and LFO piloting. Upon graduation, Sumner is transferred to Sawyer Team – an elite KLF group in the military that is said to be almost on par with Holland's SOF. Sumner never had any ambitions, goals or dreams before joining New Wave Academy. His only reason for joining was so that he could pilot the best LFOs. It is there he meets Ruri for the first time as a fellow cadet in New Wave. It is later revealed that Ruri leaves New Wave Academy upon discovering a dark truth about the academy and seeks refuge within the Vodarac, to whom she appears to be directly affiliated with at present. Sumner is unaware about Ruri's reasons for leaving, and continues to excel in the academy and serve as Sawyer Team's ace pilot. The two meet in the future during a solo mission given to Sumner to investigate the weapons black market in his area, but she later escapes as she was somewhat involved with the black market.

Sumner is on patrol on another mission not long after Holland's mutiny, when he first meets a younger Moondoggie. He asks Moondoggie's purpose in town to which Moondoggie replied that he was there to meet Holland and join up with Gekkostate. Following a series of situations designed to draw away the Sawyer team from the tower, Sumner realizes the immediate Vodarac threat at the tower. It is then when meets Sumner meets Ruri once more while she is on a mission for the Vodarac (or possibly Gekkostate). Her objective was to secure the Nirvash and deliver it to Holland, while Sumner's objective was to protect the tower against terrorist attacks by the Vodarac.

The two confront one another and it is then when Sumner's captain intervenes and shoots Ruri, injuring her arm. Sumner finally begins to realize the lies of the military, his feelings for Ruri, and what he believes is right. Surprising the captain and the Sawyer team (all of whom were his close friends), Sumner defects from the military to save Ruri from certain death. He manages to save her and has her board his LFO and escape with the promise that they will meet at their special place while he takes it upon himself to complete Ruri's objective. Sumner faces off against his teammates and defeats them while riding the Nirvash. His captain makes one last stand against Sumner and two battle at it, on military airport grounds and while airborne on refboards. Sumner proves to be the more skilled pilot and kills his captain in their aerial battle. Sumner then completes Ruri's mission and hands over the Nirvash to Holland. When asked about the purpose of the Nirvash, Holland merely replied that the Nirvash was meant to be piloted by only one person who can use it properly. Sumner sees over Holland's shoulder a younger Eureka staring at the Nirvash. Holland then recognizes Sumner's piloting and ref boarding abilities and invites him to join Gekkostate. Sumner declines saying that he wants to search for Ruri. Gekkostate departs with the Nirvash, leaving Sumner behind. While sitting at a campfire in the desert, a vehicle comes along that Sumner hails down. The driver is Moondoggie and he offers Sumner a ride out of the desert. TR1: New Wave ends here, with the story to be continued on New Vision.

Some time later, he reunited with Ruri, and the two became involved with the refboard manufacturers known as Azure. Along with Moondoggie, they briefly traveled with Azure, sabotaging several military installations along the way. Eventually, they learned that Azure's activities were tied to a conspiracy within the military, spearheaded by former New Wave student Steven Bisson and Azure's leader, Roddy Flame. They were responsible for the proliferation of Compac Feedback Systems (CFS) throughout the military's LFO pilots, and were planning on using the technology to revolt and cause mass destruction. Sumner, Ruri, and Moondoggie fought against Azure and their Army benefactors, eventually defeating Steven and Flame and ending the threat. While Moondoggie returned to Gekkostate, Sumner and Ruri stayed together.

In the final Hi-Evolution film, Sumner is a secondary antagonist and member of Dewey's unit. After Charles and Ray capture Iris, Sumner beats Eureka, only to be killed by soldiers led by Anemone.

==== Ruri ====
Voiced by: Megumi Toyoguchi (Japanese); Michelle Ruff (English)

Ruri (ルリ) is a student at New Wave and a friend of Sumner. She is an ace pilot and a good lifter, but left the academy after learning about the military's insidious motives, leaving her whereabouts unknown. Two years later, Sumner meets Ruri again. She explains that New Wave used data to steal the students' lifting moves and that she was bringing the Nirvash to Holland. She is in love with Sumner, and the two save the land from destruction.

In the manga, Ruri is a spy of the Federation Military. She shows Dominic the truth about Dewey and helps free Renton and the Gekkostate.

In the final Hi-Evolution film, Ruri is given the full name Ruri Flame. She is a faithful follower of Dewey who sacrifices her life to initiate the destruction of the space elevator. Moments before her death, she pleads to Dewey to know if she has done the right thing.

=== Adrock Thurston ===
Voiced by: Toru Furuya (Japanese); Fred Tatasciore (English)

Renton's father, Adrock Thurston (アドロック・サーストン, Adorokku Sāsuton), was a military researcher considered a hero by the military. Original author of the Ageha Plan, which he then sought to have buried as being far too destructive to ever be implemented. His team was conducting experiments involving the Seven Swell phenomenon. It is revealed in a conversation between Eureka and Renton that Adrock vanished during an experiment on the Amita Drive. He prevented the full destructive force of the experiment from being unleashed by removing the Compac/Amita Drive from its socket in the Nirvash, interrupting the transdimensional rifting that would have led to the planet's destruction, but in the process was himself taken bodily into the rift it created; nothing of him or his uniform remained, save the Compac/Amita Drive. He was later declared dead, and a massive monument, now largely unvisited by an uninterested public, was erected in his home town of Bellforest.

Later, it is revealed that his state of being was transferred to the Scub Coral along with other human beings, some of whom in normal reality were apparently suffering from the seeming catatonia caused by Despair Sickness. These individuals' consciousness apparently exist in a non-temporal state. They were staying in this form by their own will to communicate with and to attempt to understand the true nature of the Scub Coral. When Renton finally met with his father again, there was no hatred; Renton held his hand and was glad to see him without any animosity from his past feelings.

The First Summer of Love, and Adrock's role in it, is depicted in the first Hi-Evolution film. He developed a weapon named Silver Box, which was meant to attack and destroy the Command Cluster using soundwaves from music. However, as the military launched Operation Necrosis, he realized a flaw in Silver Box and desperately tried to prevent its deployment. Adrock was imprisoned for this, but escaped with Eureka's aid. Now a wanted man, he and Eureka launched the Nirvash in an attempt to stop the weapon. His fears soon proved true, as the acid jazz component failed to synchronize. This malfunction caused the Scub Coral to begin destroying the planet, so he sent Eureka away and sacrificed his life to stop it. As he was taken into the Scub Coral, Adrock wept for Renton, and renamed the disaster from Operation Necrosis to the First Summer of Love.

Adrock has no voice actor throughout the main series. The only scenes in which he appears are either narrated flashbacks or non-speaking roles, and his first vocal appearance is only featured in the first Hi-Evolution film. He is named after Ad-Rock, of the Beastie Boys.

=== Diane Thurston ===
Voiced by: Sakiko Tamagawa (Japanese); Peggy O'Neal (English)

Diane Thurston (ダイアン・サーストン, Daian Sāsuton) is Axel's granddaughter and Renton's older sister. She and Axel were the ones who raised Renton after Adroc's death. She left home some years ago, and for initially unexplained reasons her family has not heard from her since. Despite appearing in Axel's family photos and in a silhouette in the series opening, her face isn't shown for the first 35 episodes – under many different circumstances, her face in flashbacks and photographs is always covered. Much of the first few episode's narration is made as if Renton was writing letters to his sister.

Talho is troubled by Holland's past relationship with her and reacts with anxiety at her mention. Diane was obsessed with her father's research; so much that it affected her relationship with Holland. The terms of their breakup weren't thoroughly explained, but it is linked with her desire to more deeply understand Adroc's work.

At some point, Diane somehow ended up in the command center of the Scub Coral. There, in a library artificially created by the Scub Coral, she and a small group of people read to understand the truth they seek. The vast knowledge they wish to seek would take almost a lifetime and all that remains are under their own volition. Even though Diane told Renton they'll stay together, the Scub Coral command center was blown away and Renton had to leave in order to save Eureka and the kids. It is suggested that the command center will return again and that Adroc and Diane are alive and well, continuing their reading.

=== Kes ===
Kes is a young girl who is seen in the manga. She meets Eureka when her grandmother sees Eureka in the village. Once the people in the village recognize Eureka, they begin to throw rocks at her. Kes asks Eureka to bring back her father whom Eureka killed. She also helped Matthieu and Hilda by telling them that Renton and Eureka were captured by the military.

== Génération Bleu ==
Génération Bleu (ゲネラシオン・ブル, Generashion Buru) is a company based in a Swiss mountain that is studying the Scub Coral and Secrets for their own personal gain. They have teams of IFO pilots at their disposal to seek their goal as well as owning a Low Orbit Strategic Locating Satellite (低軌道戦略拠点衛星, Teikidō Senryaku Kyoten Eisei) called the Loploss (ロプロス, Ropurosu) to detect Scub Coral appearances.

While the group does not appear outside of AO, their name can be seen in several places in the second and third Hi-Evolution films.

=== Team Pied Piper ===
Team Pied Piper (チーム・パイドパイパー, Chīmu Paidopaipā) is one of the teams used by Génération Bleu to investigate and study the Scub Coral and Secrets.

Ao Fukai (フカイ・アオ, Fukai Ao)
Voiced by: Yūtarō Honjō (Japanese); Micah Solusod (English)

The protagonist of Eureka Seven: AO. Ao is the son of Renton Thurston and Eureka. He has his father's facial features and brown hair (until he first piloted the Nirvash Neo and it turned turquoise, like his mother's), but has his mother's eyes and skin color. His mother one day fell from a clear sky into a bay in Iwato Jima, Okinawa, before giving birth to Ao sometime later in 2012. After Eureka was handed over to the American Armed Forces ten years ago, as the islanders believe her and Ao's presence angered their local deity the "Sea Colossus" with the appearance of Scub Coral, Ao ended up in the care of his mother's only friend Dr. Toshio Fukai. During his middle school entrance ceremony, Ao discovers the RA272 Nirvash Mark One after he unintentionally retrieves his mother's bracelet from Gazelle who was smuggling it for the Japanese Army, and then Gazelle gets him to pilot the IFO, both named the Nirvash by Eureka and created by Renton. Ostracized by the villagers and targeted by the armies of several countries, Ao decides to join Team Pied Piper, hoping to find her. At the end of the series, Ao has altered reality where the Secrets didn't exist, left roaming in time distortion. He adopts some of Truth's traits.

At birth, Renton and Eureka named their son Ao Thurston. He was renamed Ao Fukai by his adopted grandfather after Eureka's disappearance.

Fleur Blanc (フレア・ブラン, Furea Buran)
Voiced by: Ayaka Ōhashi (Japanese); Sainty Reid (English)

Fleur is a French 16-year-old IFO pilot for Team Pied Piper, piloting the RA164 Alleluia. She is aware of her prowess as a pilot and is prideful and headstrong. Fleur is also a popular celebrity, and updates her blog regularly. She often clashes with her father Christophe, due to the death of her mother. Despite claiming she has no feelings for Ao, she usually shows deep concern for him. Fleur assume her father's role as CEO of the company, after his sacrifice to protect her and Ao from Truth's invasion.

In the final OVA, Ao alters the event where Fleur doesn't suffer in her mother's accident. She is seen working as second-in-command and remembers Ao as her hero and decide to save him from time-leaping. Firing numerous quartz that converts the broken Nirvash into a different shape, stabilizing Ao's physical body to touch the earth and reunite with Fleur.

Elena Peoples (エレナ・ピ－プルズ, Erena Pīpuruzu)
Voiced by: Chiaki Omigawa (Japanese); Jad Saxton (English)

Elena is an American 15-year-old IFO pilot for Team Pied Piper, piloting the RA304 Kyrie. She is a reserved girl who is hard to read. She is an avid netizen and enjoys checking up on her favorite websites to see if they are updated, even in the field. She makes various references to anime, manga, and video games. Her helmet also bears a resemblance to Hello Kitty. She was originally known as Ellen Brooks, who lived in 1981 until Eureka saved her during a Scub burst near the Caribbean Sea that teleported her to the year 2020, falsely believing to have come from another world, where she ended up at American research facility making IFO pilots. Sometime before she was recruited, Ellen took the name "Elena Peoples" from another girl who died five years prior to the beginning of the series. Since then, Elena desires to return to Eureka's timeline thus showing an unconcealed hatred towards her, until she learns the truth.

In an alternate history, Ellen remained in her original time and grown up as a captain of ARGO exploration ship. She saved the real Elena Peoples who eventually join Generation Bleu and pilots the RA304 Kyrie.

Ivica Tanović (イビチャ・タノヴィッチ, Ibicha Tanovitchi)
Voiced by: Tetsuo Gotō (Japanese); John Swasey (English)

Ivica is a Balkan war veteran who met Eureka as an American soldier during the mission to prevent the Scub Burst in Okinawa that ended in her disappearance. After that, he accepts Christophe Blanc's invitation to join Génération Bleu and is nominated the chief of Team Pied Piper commanding its mothership, the Triton. He tries hard in every mission to protect the children piloting the IFOs. He named the team "Pied Piper", comparing himself to the Pied Piper of Hamelin.

Rebecka Hallström (レベッカ・ハルストレム, Rebekka Harusutoremu)
Voiced by: Chie Nakamura (Japanese); Jamie Marchi (English)

Rebecka is the commander and strategist of Team Pied Piper. She appears to be the only person who is not eccentric in some way.

Georg (ゲオルグ, Georugu)
Voiced by: Hidenobu Kiuchi (first version) and Kazuhiko Inoue (second version) (Japanese); Tyson Rinehart (English)

Georg is the AI computer system on the Triton (トリトン号, Toriton-gō), the Air Assault Landing Ship (空中強襲揚陸艦, Kūchū Kyōshū Yōrikukan) utilized by Team Pied Piper. It originally spoke in a light voice but after being taken over by the Secret, its voice remains permanently deep and it also becomes far more serious than it was in the past.

=== Team Goldilocks ===
Team Goldilocks (チーム・ゴルディロックス, Chīmu Gorudirokkusu) is another team hired by Génération Bleu to study the Scub Coral and Secrets. However, after Operation Polaris, the course of history is altered as if they were never assembled at all. So far only Ao remembers about their existence.

Bruno Hans (ブルーノ・ハンス, Burūno Hansu)
Voiced by: Yuu Shimaka (Japanese); David Wald (English)

Bruno was the leader of Team Goldilocks and chief of their mothership the Medon (メドン号, Medon-gō). Chloe and her teammates believe he was a little strange. Like the chief of the Triton, Hans never allows himself to forget that children's lives are precious. He died protecting his companions during an operation.

Chloe McCaffrey (クロエ・マキャフリイ, Kuroe Makyafurii)
Voiced by: Ayu Matsuura (Japanese); Felecia Angelle (English)

Chloe is an 11-year-old IFO pilot for Team Goldilocks, piloting the RA169 Requiem. Despite her short stature, Chloe refuses to acknowledge that she is still a child. After Ao alters the course of history, it is revealed that she and her sister Maeve are living with their mother in the family's bakery shop in Ireland.

Maeve McCaffrey (メイヴ・マキャフリイ, Meivu Makyafurii)
Voiced by: Nao Tōyama (Japanese); Kristi Kang (English)

Maeve is Chloe's older sister and is Team Goldilocks' pilot of the RA121 Gloria. After Ao alters the course of history, it is revealed that like her sister, she lives with their mother who owns a bakery.

Maggie Kwan (マギー・クァン, Magī Kwan)
Voiced by: Ayumi Fujimura (Japanese); Morgan Garrett (English)

Maggie is a close friend of Chloe and Maeve and serves as the pilot of RA302 Credo. After Ao alters the course of history, she is seen as an Allied Forces pilot stationed in the U.S.S. Ronald Reagan. She befriends with Elena whom she helped confirm what Eureka said about her origin.

In the third alternate history, Maggie has a fateful meeting at the McCaffrey's bakery residence in 2013.

=== Team Harlequin ===
Team Harlequin (チーム・ハーレクイン, Chīmu Hārekuin) is another of Génération Bleu's teams stationed in the company's space station.

Hannah Bester (ハンナ・ベスター, Hanna Besutā)
Voiced by: Yūko Katō (Japanese); Lydia Mackay (English)

Hannah is helmswoman of the Great Proteus (グレート・プロテウス号, Gurēto Puroteusu-gō) and acts as a mother to her charges.

Liu Ing (リュウ・イン, Ryū In)
Voiced by: Fūka Haruna (Japanese); Alison Viktorin (English)

An IFO pilot for Team Harlequin.

Lerato Food (レラト・フード, Rerato Fūdo)
Voiced by: Fumie Mizusawa (Japanese); Trina Nishimura (English)

An IFO pilot for Team Harlequin.

Rajkumar Nair (ラジクマール・ナーイル, Rajikumāru Nāiru)
Voiced by: Kōsuke Hatakeyama (Japanese); Corey Cleary-Stoner (English)

An IFO pilot for Team Harlequin. Out of the three pilots, Rajkumar is the leader.

=== Administrators ===
Christophe Blanc (クリストフ・ブラン, Kurisutofu Buran)
Voiced by: Rokurō Naya (Japanese); Chuck Huber (English)

Christophe Blanc is the president of Génération Bleu and Fleur's father. He seeks to find the "Secret" for his company's own uses. Before founding Génération Bleu, he was CEO of a French aeronautics business. Christophe entrusted his daughter Fleur to be in charge of his purpose upon his death, due to a fusion explosion in the headquarters' basement where the Quartz Gun is stored when Truth attacks Génération Bleu one last time. His last words to Ao were to learn the "true enemy" he must face for all mankind. Christopher is alive seen in the final OVA.

Alexander Boyle (アレクサンダー・ボイル, Arekusandā Boiru)
Voiced by: Akio Nojima (Japanese); Charlie Campbell (English)

Boyle is the technical director in charge of maintenance of Génération Bleu's IFOs.

Stanley (スタンリー, Sutanrī)
Voiced by: Ikuya Sawaki (Japanese); Kent Williams (English)

Stanley is an executive in Génération Bleu and representative of Big Blue World, the world's largest PR firm funding Génération Bleu. He takes over administration of Team Goldilocks after Bruno's death.

=== Others ===
Miller (ミラー, Mirā)
Voiced by: Chiaki Omigawa (Japanese); Jad Saxton (English)

Miller is a British indie rock star from Manchester who performs on contract at the Génération Bleu headquarters. Blanc orders Gazelle, Pippo, and Han Juno to keep an eye on her, as he believes she is a spy for the American government, but Gazelle later postulates that she is actually Elena Peoples in disguise. It is discovered that despite a 97% physical similarity between the two young women, their DNA is not identical. Elena later has a hallucination where she seemingly attacks Miller, and she later is seen throwing away the wig she was using. In episode 18, Elena confessed to Fleur privately she was responsible for the death of the original Miller.

== Iwato Jima residents ==
Naru Arata (アラタ・ナル, Arata Naru)
Voiced by: Kanako Miyamoto (Japanese); Lindsay Seidel (English)

Naru is a 13-year-old girl and one of Ao's neighbors. She is one of the few people who doesn't abuse Ao, and she has a strong friendship with him. She requires oxygen therapy due to an incident in the past involving a Scub Burst and the mysterious Sea Giant, but she somehow became a Yuta (ユタ), a psychic in Okinawan folklore, as a result. It is revealed in episode 12 that the reason she has trouble breathing is because there is a piece of scub coral growing inside her. She lives with her grandmother, father Mitsuo, and sister Miyu, due to the disappearance of her mother several years ago during the Scub Burst event. In episode seven, Naru is taken and manipulated by Truth. Naru begins to see the truth and understands the Scub Coral as well becoming the pilot of the Nirvash Type Zero, the LFO that Eureka and Renton piloted and the namesake of the Nirvash IFO their son pilots.

In an alternate history, Ao rescued a young Naru in 2015 and becomes her guidance. Subsequently, Naru cares for younger patients at Toshio's clinic.

Dr. Toshio Fukai (フカイ・トシオ, Fukai Toshio)
Voiced by: Katsunosuke Hori (Japanese); R Bruce Elliott (English)

Toshio is Ao's guardian and friend. He owns a medical clinic on Iwato Jima and puts saving people before any other priority. He gave Eureka refuge before the American Armed Forces came looking for her, and after she was taken away, he took in Ao as his grandson.

Mitsuo Arata (アラタ・ミツオ, Arata Mitsuo)
Voiced by: Masafumi Kimura (Japanese); Phil Parsons (English)

Mitsuo is Naru's father. Naru's mother died in the Scub Burst event 10 years ago.

Miyu Arata (アラタ・ミユ, Arata Miyu)
Voiced by: Nao Tōyama (Japanese); Emerick Jade (English)

Miyu is Naru's little sister.

Grandma (お婆, Obaa)
Voiced by: Ako Mayama (Japanese); Juli Erickson (English)

Naru's grandmother and Mitsuo's mother.

Kazuyuki Kaneshiro (カネシロ・カズユキ, Kaneshiro Kazuyuki)
Voiced by: Naomi Kusumi (Japanese); Mark Stoddard (English)

Kazuyuki Kaneshiro is Gazelle's father. He is a former popular Okinawan singer and sanshin player who leads the locals against Ao when the boy seemingly fulfills his destiny.

Teruhiko Niigaki (ニイガキ・テルヒコ, Niigaki Teruhiko)
Voiced by: Tetsuo Komura (Japanese); Brian Mathis (English)

Teruhiko Niigaki is an officer of the Okinawa Self-Defense Forces and Pippo's father.

=== Smugglers ===
A group of Iwato Jima residents are smugglers (運び屋, hakobiya), working for whoever pays them top dollar. They stumble on Ao while smuggling an important cargo for the Japanese Armed Forces, leading to the boy's encounter with the Nirvash. Later they sneak aboard the Triton, looking to have an audience with Génération Bleu's president Christophe Blanc who employs their services for reasons still unknown.

Gazelle (ガゼル, Gazeru)
Voiced by: Takuya Kirimoto (Japanese); Brandon Potter (English)

Gazelle is the head of the group of smugglers on Iwato Jima. Although it often appears he is messing around, he is very smart and always knows how to get a good deal. He feels sorry for how Ao has been treated throughout his life for things he did not do, and has denied being part of his family for his father's actions. His real name is Jiro (ジロウ, Jirō).

In an alternate history, he becomes a high-ranking official of the Independent Okinawa state.

Pippo (ピッポ)
Voiced by: Keikō Sakai (Japanese); Matt Thurston (English)

Pippo is Gazelle's old friend and accomplice. He has a strong conviction for justice, and also is very unlucky. Against his father's wishes, he does not join the Okinawa Private Self-Defense Forces.

Han Juno (ハン・ジュノ)
Voiced by: Yoshinori Fujita (Japanese); Anthony Bowling (English)

Han Juno is one of Gazelle's friends who is a very adept computer hacker. He is descended from people from four different nations and often reacts to situations with indifference.

== Other characters ==
Truth (トゥルース, Turūsu)
Voiced by: Kazuhiko Inoue (Japanese); Todd Haberkorn (English)

Truth is the Secret who confronted Eureka in Okinawa during her disappearance ten years before and met Naru (the second time she is in the past), able to shape-shift into human form. His human form is first seen as the son of Johannson, a popular author who opposed the United States globalist tactics before committing suicide years ago. Without realizing he is a human-form Secret, he holds a deep hatred towards Eureka and is determined to seize the RA272 Nirvash as his own, and his hatred was passed towards Ao upon realizing he is Eureka's son and the true pilot of the IFO. As part of his plan, he manipulates Naru into siding with him and gives her the Nirvash Type Zero after it is seized by the Japanese military. Truth takes control of the Kanon an unknown LFO when invading Génération Bleu in episode 20. As a Secret, he is capable of killing people who are infected by Scub Corals. When Truth is shot with the Quartz Gun by Ao, he is somehow converted into the Archetype of Ao's Nirvash Neo. In the final scene, he is shown to remain in his astral form, choosing to drift in time and space while Ao returned to his world.

Amber Thurston (アンバー・サーストン, Anbā Sāsuton)

Amber is Renton and Eureka's daughter and Ao's older sister. She looks exactly like Eureka. She appears only once in the anime, although she was obscured in a blanket. During her pregnancy with their daughter, Eureka and Renton were warned that their child would be affected by high trapar concentrations due to being a human-Coralian hybrid, but they chose to carry the pregnancy to term rather than abortion. After her birth, she was implied to be healthy until her body turned to stone and she died as a result of the high trapar when she was 3 months old. Her death serves as the catalyst for Renton trying to destroy the Scub Coral and sending Eureka to the past of an alternative universe in order for Ao to survive in a world with less trapar. Although both Renton and Eureka continue to mourn their daughter's death, it is Renton that's most grief-stricken and he blames himself for her death.

Noah (ノア, Noa)
Voiced by: Nao Tōyama (Japanese); Monica Rial (English)

Noah is an Iriomote three-toed sloth (イリオモテミツユビナマケモノ, Iriomote Mitsuyubi Namakemono) that is kept by Naru as her pet. When Ao joins Team Pied Piper, she entrusts Noah in his care.

Nakamura (ナカムラ)
Voiced by: Kōichi Tōchika (Japanese); Duncan Brannan (English)

A young Japanese Defense Force Officer who intends on catapulting Japan's International status by aggressive means. He allies himself with Truth to learn the power of Scub Coral and the Secrets, believing that it can transform into the military power that Japan needs much to intimidate her neighbors. Nakamura does not hesitate to manipulate various Japanese military personnel and use Truth's power to achieve his goal. Nakamura lets it slip to Gazelle that he is of Okinawan descent, however, he is in denial of his origin. Later, Nakamura resigns from the military to pursue another extreme nationalistic plan of his.

In an alternate history, Nakamura becomes Japan's Vice Minister of Foreign Affairs in 2027.

Nick Tanaka (ニキ・タナカ, Niki Tanaka)
Voiced by: Tomeyushi Hyuga (Japanese); Andrew T. Chandler (English)

A US army officer who has involved himself in the affairs of Japan and Okinawan independence for decades. His goal is to capture the IFO Mark I and Eureka. He later leads a task force to eliminate Génération Bleu.

Endo (エンドウ, Endō)
Voiced by: Satoshi Sasaki (Japanese); Robert McCollum (English)

The only survivor of Japanese ground force in Eureka's battle with Truth a decade ago, and a colonel in the Japanese army. With a strong sense of duty, he risks himself to protect Ao as he promised to take care of Eureka's child before she went to the fight. Endo suffers a brutal murder by Truth and the Japanese Army blames Ao for it as an excuse to take him under custody.

Endo has a small role in the final Hi-Evolution film as a member of Dewey's unit within the Green Earth military. He assists Dewey's pursuit of Eureka and Iris by hacking into A.C.I.D.'s financial records to track the pair's location. At the film's climax, he sacrifices himself alongside Ruri Flame to detonate bombs and collapse the space elevator as part of Dewey's final plan. He is shown to have an image of Eureka as the wallpaper on his computer, and prior to his death expresses that he wishes he could have seen her again.

Iris McKenzie (アイリス・マッケンジー, Iris McKenzie)
Voiced by: Rina Endō (Japanese); Jessica DiCicco (English)

Appearing in the third Hi-Evolution film, She is a humanoid Coralian that emerged into the real world, where she was adopted by Mark and Saoirse McKenzie, and has powers similar to those Eureka formerly possessed. These powers give her the ability to summon Scub Coral, usually manifesting as a child's drawing of a castle.

Because of her powers, she is sought by Dewey's faction of the Green Earth military. Eureka intervenes on behalf of A.C.I.D. to save her, and is soon assigned the role of Iris's protector and mentor. Their relationship is initially combative, but as they flee together across Europe from Dewey, they slowly begin bonding. Iris shows Eureka her drawings of the castle, identifying it as the place she came from, and claiming that she has an older brother trapped there.

She is eventually captured by Charles, Ray and Sumner and brought to Dewey, who intends to destroy all life using her powers. By this time, she is undergoing the same transformation Eureka did at the end of Psalms of Planets, including sprouting wings. A.C.I.D. frees her, and when Renton arrives to help Eureka save the world, Iris reveals he is her "brother." In the wake of Eureka and Renton's apparent sacrifice, Iris assures the others that things will be okay, because she is an Eureka.
