= Overproof =

Studio album by Substance Abuse
- Released: April 26, 2006
- Recorded: 2003 – 2006
- Genre: Hip Hop/Rap
- Label: Threshold Recordings
- Producer: Substance Abuse; KutMasta Kurt; Hanif Hobbs; DJ Medicine; Waes One; Mike Nardone

Substance Abuse chronology
Brand New Crime(EP) (1998)	Overproof (2006)

Overproof is the first full-length album by the American hip hop duo Substance Abuse. The Los Angeles–based group have garnered much acclaim following the release of the album, particularly for its incorporation of legendary MC Kool Keith and the ever-present MF Doom on the songs 'Night On The Town' and 'Profitless Thoughts' respectively. The album received four stars in URB and Scratch Magazine.

The album was rated a 7.2 out of 10 by IGN.

== Track listing ==
1. "Fake Contacts" – 2:52
2. "Night on the Town" (feat. Kool Keith) – 4:31
3. "Profitless Thoughts" (feat. MF Doom) – 3:29
4. "Mercy Killings" (feat. Deranged, Mawnstr & Nebz) – 4:44
5. "No Guarantees" – 5:42
6. "Myka Nyne (Interlude)" – 0:29
7. "Everyone's a Critic" (feat. Rasco) – 4:24
8. "The Graduate" – 4:32
9. "Sickness" – 3:54
10. "Check" (feat. Motion Man) – 5:28
11. "Withdrawals, Pt. 2" – 3:23
12. "Can't Call It" (feat. P.E.A.C.E., Deranged & Mawnstr) – 5:30
13. "I Don't Mean to Talk Shit (Ill Spoken Skit)" – 2:03
14. "Collateral Damage" (feat. Prego W/ Zest) – 3:21
15. "Fractured Form" (feat. Erik Solo)" – 4:30
16. "Sickness (Remix)" (feat. Saafir) – 3:09
