= Substance Abuse (band) =

American hip hop group

- Origin: Los Angeles, California
- Genres: Hip Hop
- Years active: 1998 – Present
- Label: Threshold Recordings Feed the Peeps
- Members: Subz; Eso Tre

Substance Abuse is a Los Angeles based hip-hop group consisting of the duo Subz (Justin Hollingsworth) and Eso Tre (John Heath). The group dropped their debut single "What The F**K You Rhymin' For?" in 2000 on the now defunct Ground Control Records, which was followed by the single "Can't Call It"/"No Guarantees" featuring P.E.A.C.E. and Thes One on Weapon Shaped Records. Their debut album, Overproof, was released in 2006, and features cameos from Kool Keith, MF Doom, Motion Man, Saafir, and Rasco. The album received four stars in URB and Scratch Magazine. The group released their sophomore effort, Background Music, featuring Tash, MC Eiht, KRS-One, Sadat X, Percee P, Myka 9, and Max Julien in 2013. In 2016, they released the follow-up EP, "Background Music: The Redux."

== Discography ==
=== Albums ===
- Overproof (Threshold Recordings, 2006)
- Background Music (Feed The Peeps, 2013)
- Background Music: The Redux (Feed The Peeps, 2016)

=== EPs ===
- Brand New Crime (Rocketship Records, 1998)
