= List of Eureka Seven episodes =

Eureka Seven
- Cover of the first Blu-ray box set released by Funimation in North America, featuring Renton Thurston
- No. of episodes: 50 + 1 special

Release
- Original network: MBS
- Original release: April 17, 2005 – April 2, 2006

Season chronology
- Next → Eureka Seven: AO

Eureka Seven is an anime series created and produced by Bones and directed by Tomoki Kyoda. The series ran for a total of fifty episodes, as well as a recap special titled "Navigation ray=out", which recaps the first half of the series. The first episode aired in Japan on April 17, 2005, and the final episode on April 2, 2006. The series was later picked up by Adult Swim for the United States market and began airing on April 16, 2006. Adult Swim aired the last episode on April 29, 2007, replacing Eureka's dialogue and the final scene with Axel and the children with the shortened regular opening and ending themes. A week later on May 6, they re-aired the episode with the original opening and ending content intact after complaints from viewers.

Almost all of the series' episode titles correspond to real songs, composed by Japanese or foreign artists. Some of these have been stated to be intentional references (including "Blue Monday"), and other phrases previously only existed as song titles.

== Episodes ==
| No. | Title | Musical reference | Directed by | Written by | Original release date | English air date |
|---|---|---|---|---|---|---|
| 1 | "Blue Monday"; Transliteration: "Burū Mandē" (Japanese: ブルーマンデー) | "Blue Monday" by New Order | Masayuki Miyaji | Dai Satō | April 17, 2005 | April 16, 2006 |
Renton Thurston, son of the legendary hero Adrock Thurston, lives a boring, monotonous life in the village of Bellforest. This life is suddenly interrupted when the mysterious LFO known as the Nirvash Type Zero and its pilot, Eureka, crash-land into his room, followed by Gekkostate – and the United Federation military.
| 2 | "Blue Sky Fish"; Transliteration: "Burū Sukai Fisshu" (Japanese: ブルースカイ・フィッシュ) | "Sky Fish" by Color Variation | Kazuya Murata | Dai Satō | April 24, 2005 | April 23, 2006 |
As Gekkostate engages the military in the sky over Bellforest, Renton attempts to deliver the Amita Drive, a memento of his father, to Eureka and the Nirvash. In doing so, he releases the typeZERO's hidden power – the Seven Swell.
| 3 | "Motion Blue"; Transliteration: "Mōshon Burū" (Japanese: モーション・ブルー) | "Motion Blue" by Index AI | Ikurō Satō | Dai Satō | May 1, 2005 | April 30, 2006 |
The members of Gekkostate rush back to the Gekko after defeating the Izumo's KLF platoon, with Renton in tow. When they arrive to find a military blockade, the Nirvash must conduct a daring decoy operation in order to draw attention away from the Gekko.
| 4 | "Watermelon"; Transliteration: "Wōtāmeron" (Japanese: ウォーターメロン) | "Watermelon Man" by Herbie Hancock | Takao Abo | Dai Satō | May 8, 2005 | May 7, 2006 |
Renton has joined Gekkostate in order to be with Eureka, but what he discovers is that life on the Gekko is not much different from his previous life in Bellforest – until Gekkostate takes a certain job in order to earn some desperately needed money. Meanwhile, the Council of Sages decides to reinstate Dewey Novak, a former military officer who has ties to Adrock Thurston and something known only as the "Ageha Plan".
| 5 | "Vivid Bit"; Transliteration: "Bibitto Bitto" (Japanese: ビビット・ビット) | "Vivid" by Electronic | Akitoshi Yokoyama | Yūichi Nomura | May 15, 2005 | May 14, 2006 |
Renton goes with Talho Yūki and Hilda on a routine shopping errand, but when Talho gets drunk and into trouble, it's up to Renton to protect her by piloting a combat LFO for the first time.
| 6 | "Childhood"; Transliteration: "Chairudofuddo" (Japanese: チャイルドフッド) | "Childhood" by Jeff Mills | Shin Matsuo | Ichirō Ōkouchi | May 22, 2005 | May 21, 2006 |
Renton's relationship with the kids that call Eureka "Mama" worsens as he becomes the victim of multiple pranks. However, when the kids' latest anti-Renton adventure compromises the Gekko's stealth capabilities, Renton takes to the skies with them to disable a military outpost in the Gekko's path.
| 7 | "Absolute Defeat"; Transliteration: "Abusoryūto Difīto" (Japanese: アブソリュート・ディフィート) | TBA | Hideki Itō | Shōtarō Suga | May 29, 2005 | May 28, 2006 |
Gekkostate's hazing of Renton continues; he is sent on a "mission of utmost importance", which is a front for a drawn-out prank that eventually involves Moondoggie as well. Meanwhile, KLF squads are being destroyed and Dewey begins formulating a plan to deal with the enemy, known as Coralians.
| 8 | "Glorious Brilliance"; Transliteration: "Guroriasu Buririansu" (Japanese: グロリアス・ブリリアンス) | TBA | Tsuyoshi Yoshimoto | Hiroshi Ōnogi | June 5, 2005 | June 4, 2006 |
Renton, Eureka and the kids (Maurice, Maeter and Linck) go on a shopping trip, where they meet Tiptory, a member of the Vodarac religion. Meanwhile, Gekkostate takes a job to capture a suspected terrorist – who turns out to be none other than Tiptory.
| 9 | "Paper Moon Shine"; Transliteration: "Pēpā Mūn Shain" (Japanese: ペーパームーン・シャイン) | "It's Only a Paper Moon" by Harold Arlen | Kazuya Murata | Dai Satō | June 12, 2005 | June 11, 2006 |
After landing at Ciudades del Cielo, an altercation between Renton and Holland Novak leads to Renton running off into the city, where he discovers the truth of what happened there and the origins of Gekkostate.
| 10 | "Higher Than the Sun"; Transliteration: "Haiā Zan Za San" (Japanese: ハイアー・ザン・ザ・サン) | "Higher Than the Sun" by Primal Scream | Hiroshi Haraguchi | Yūichi Nomura | June 19, 2005 | June 18, 2006 |
Holland hears news of a big wave arriving on the other side of the planet, so he has the Gekko take off in an outer-atmospheric flight mode to get there in time. However, Talho, irritated at what she perceives as the selfishness of the rest of Gekkostate, redirects the Gekko to the ruins of a military base that holds special meaning for her and Holland.
| 11 | "Into the Nature"; Transliteration: "Intū Za Neichā" (Japanese: イントゥー・ザ・ネイチャー) | "Into the Nature" by Hardfloor | Takao Abo | Hiroshi Ōnogi | June 26, 2005 | June 25, 2006 |
A Coralian appears over the town of South Ailess, and Gekkostate decides to investigate. Meanwhile, Dewey's new unit, the Nirvash typeTheEND, and its pilot, Anemone, also head towards South Ailess with the Izumo. As the two ships reach the Coralian and attempt to break through, the two Nirvashes meet in battle.
| 12 | "Acperience 1"; Transliteration: "Akuperiensu 1" (Japanese: アクペリエンス・1) | "Acperience 1" by Hardfloor | Ikurō Satō | Dai Satō | July 3, 2005 | July 2, 2006 |
As the two Nirvashes, typeTheEND and typeZERO, unleash their power, they are drawn into the body of the aerial Coralian, known as the Zone. Inside, Renton, Eureka and Anemone are connected by what appears to be a dream, and yet not. Renton was trapped in a dreamworld being controlled by Anemone while Eureka followed Renton in order to get him back. Meanwhile, the Gekko and the Izumo engage in a desperate game of chicken.
| 13 | "The Beginning"; Transliteration: "Za Biginingu" (Japanese: ザ・ビギニング) | "The Beginning" by Rhythim is Rhythim | Tsuyoshi Yoshimoto | Yūichi Nomura | July 10, 2005 | July 9, 2006 |
In the wake of the Coralian's disappearance, Eureka and Anemone are left injured. Renton and Dominic Sorel, who showed up to pick up Anemone, travel to the nearest town to get some medicine for the two. Later, when they return, they find themselves in the middle of a skirmish between the Gekkostate's LFOs and the Izumo's KLFs.
| 14 | "Memory Band"; Transliteration: "Memorī Bando" (Japanese: メモリー・バンド) | "Memory Band" by Rotary Connection | Kenji Mizuhata | Dai Satō | July 17, 2005 | July 16, 2006 |
Renton, Stoner and Dominic mull over previous and recent events – the appearance and disappearance of the Coralian and the mutiny of the SOF members who would become Gekkostate.
| 15 | "Human Behavior"; Transliteration: "Hyūman Biheivyua" (Japanese: ヒューマン・ビヘイヴュア) | "Human Behaviour" by Björk | Hideyo Yamamoto | Shōtarō Suga | July 24, 2005 | July 23, 2006 |
Gekkostate is on a health craze and send Renton, Eureka and Matthieu to visit Controlad on a mission to gather a certain fruit. All over town, they find the prices are too high, so they decide to pick some up "in the wild". This gets them into trouble with a local farmer, who turns out to be Renton's uncle, Yucatán Iglasias. When Renton lies to him about being in the military, things quickly spin out of control.
| 16 | "Opposite View"; Transliteration: "Opojitto Vyū" (Japanese: オポジット・ヴュー) | "Opposite View" by Del Amitri | Sayo Yamamoto | Chiaki J. Konaka | July 31, 2005 | July 30, 2006 |
The Gekko lands at FAC-51, an abandoned mine, to undergo repairs in the aftermath of the battle at South Ailess. Eureka has been silent and aloof ever since Renton piloted the Nirvash to rescue her and Matthieu from the military. While trying to find a way to interact with her, Renton is called on an expeditionary trip into the mine with Hap, Matthieu, Moondoggie, Gidget and Stoner. Renton wanders off and finds a mysterious house. The house appears to be Fallingwater.
| 17 | "Sky Rock Gate"; Transliteration: "Sukai Rokku Gēto" (Japanese: スカイ・ロック・ゲート) | TBA | Hiroshi Haraguchi | Hiroshi Ōnogi | August 7, 2005 | August 20, 2006 |
The Gekko needs a large amount of reflection film to fix the damage from South Ailess, so Ken-Goh, Moondoggie, Hap, Matthieu, Stoner and Renton visit a local workshop to get some made. When they arrive, they find the shop in disuse and its current owner, Neil, drunk. After Ken-Goh gets Neil to agree to make them some film, they head out to catch the raw materials – skyfish. Meanwhile, Dewey announces his plan for the world to his new unit.
| 18 | "Ill Communication"; Transliteration: "Iru Komyunikēshon" (Japanese: イル・コミュニケーション) | Ill Communication by the Beastie Boys | Kazuya Murata | Shōtarō Suga | August 21, 2005 | August 27, 2006 |
While the Gekko's repairs are moving along at a steady pace, Renton meets a miner who hasn't given up on FAC-51. He begins to make friends with him when they discover a common interest. However, the miner is desperate for a big score, and when he sees the Nirvash typeZERO, he sees the biggest score of all – even if it means taking it from its current owners. Meanwhile, Eureka begins to show signs of stress from being around the mine.
| 19 | "Acperience 2"; Transliteration: "Akuperiensu 2" (Japanese: アクペリエンス・2) | "Acperience 2" by Hardfloor | Ikurō Satō | Yūichi Nomura | August 28, 2005 | September 3, 2006 |
Eureka's condition worsens, and Renton is lost in thought. In the midst of depression, Eureka climbs into the Nirvash and removes the Compac Drive; however, this leads to the Nirvash activating by itself. When Renton finds out, he chases the Nirvash deep into the mines. Meanwhile, the military launches an all-out attack on FAC-51, hoping to smoke Gekkostate out – or bury them under the rubble of the collapsing mine.
| 20 | "Substance Abuse"; Transliteration: "Sabusutansu Abyūzu" (Japanese: サブスタンス アビューズ) | "Substance Abuse" by F.U.S.E. | Shingo Kaneko | Ichirō Ōkouchi | September 4, 2005 | September 10, 2006 |
Eureka is brought to the medical bay in the wake of nearly merging with the Scub Coral. Tensions between Renton and Holland continue to rise, and when Holland decides to go on a rescue mission for the Vodarac over Renton's insisting that he take Eureka to a "proper" hospital, a violent argument breaks out. When the rescue mission goes sour, though, Renton still goes out to help - after getting unjustly slapped by Talho (but is the last time he will help Holland). Renton, although while helping Holland, goes too far after not knowing about what was between Eureka and Holland.
| 21 | "Runaway"; Transliteration: "Rannawei" (Japanese: ランナウェイ) | "Runaway" by Nuyorican Soul | Takato Mori | Hiroshi Ōnogi | September 11, 2005 | September 17, 2006 |
The Vodarac priest that Holland saved conducts the ritual to remove the remnants of the Scub from Eureka's body. Renton tries to come to grips with the fact that he's been killing people in the Nirvash the whole time he's been with Gekkostate. When the members don't give him the answers he wants to hear, he decides to jump ship and run away from everything. Meanwhile, Dewey contracts a pair of mercenaries to deal with Gekkostate once and for all.
| 22 | "Crackpot"; Transliteration: "Kurakkupotto" (Japanese: クラックポット) | "Krakpot" by Plastikman | Hideki Itō | Dai Satō | September 18, 2005 | September 24, 2006 |
Renton wanders aimlessly after having left the Gekko, while the members of Gekkostate discuss his departure and how to tell Eureka. Eventually, Renton winds up in the city, where he meets Charles Beams and Ray Beams. They take him aboard their ship, the Swan; after seeing how they live, compared to his former life on the Gekko, he decides to stay.
| 23 | "Differentia"; Transliteration: "Difarenshia" (Japanese: ディファレンシア) | "Differentia" by Ryuichi Sakamoto | Takao Abo | Shōtarō Suga | September 25, 2005 | October 1, 2006 |
Renton joins Charles and Ray on a job to deliver a believer in Vodarac to a holy ground, but when Renton tries instead to get the girl treatment, contradicting the family's wishes, he learns more about how the world around him works. Meanwhile, Holland tries to deal with the fact that he has to tell Eureka that Renton left the Gekko.
| 24 | "Paradise Lost"; Transliteration: "Paradaisu Rosuto" (Japanese: パラダイス・ロスト) | "Paradise Lost" by Ryuichi Sakamoto | Hiroshi Haraguchi | Yūichi Nomura | October 2, 2005 | October 8, 2006 |
Eureka, lonely without Renton, begins to take on his responsibilities. Holland finally admits the real reason he's been so hard on Renton. Renton, aboard the Swan, begins to feel like a family with Charles and Ray. On a test run that turns into an encounter with the military, Renton and Charles lay bare their respective secrets that Renton was with Gekkostate, and Charles and Ray were hired to destroy Gekkostate.
| 25 | "World's End Garden"; Transliteration: "Wāruzu Endo Gāden" (Japanese: ワールズ・エンド・ガーデン) | "World's End Garden" by Gnomusy | Kazuya Murata | Hiroshi Ōnogi | October 9, 2005 | October 15, 2006 |
After leaving the Swan, Renton once again wanders around, unable to find a way to return to the Gekko. He collapses in a forest of pile bunkers and is found by William B. Baxter, a hermit living with his wife, Martha, who suffers from Despair Sickness. As he recovers from his weariness, he learns more about nature and about love. Meanwhile, Holland searches for Renton amidst military blockades until he realizes the Gekko is nearly surrounded.
| 26 | "Morning Glory"; Transliteration: "Mōningu Gurōrī" (Japanese: モーニング・グローリー) | "Morning Glory" by Oasis | Masayuki Miyaji | Ichirō Ōkouchi | October 16, 2005 | October 22, 2006 |
The military prepares their assault on the Gekko, while Holland rushes back to try and extricate Gekkostate from impending disaster. However, when he shows up without Renton, Eureka takes matters into her own hands and goes out to search for him ... just as Renton returns to the Gekko, looking for Eureka.
| 27 | "Helter Skelter"; Transliteration: "Herutā Sukerutā" (Japanese: ヘルタースケルター) | "Helter Skelter" by Meat Beat Manifesto | Tarō Iwasaki | Dai Satō | October 23, 2005 | October 29, 2006 |
During a lull after the failed ambush on Gekkostate, Renton and Eureka are "locked" in the brig while Holland and Talho prepare for an inevitable attack by Charles and Ray. When the attack finally happens, the plans laid by the two ex-SOF aces are played out, leading to confrontations between Renton, Talho and Ray, and Holland and Charles.
| 28 | "Memento Mori"; Transliteration: "Memento Mori" (Japanese: メメントモリ) | "Memento Mori" by Mr. Children | Ikurō Satō | Yūichi Nomura | October 30, 2005 | November 5, 2006 |
Renton tries to deal with the shock of Charles' death. Meanwhile, depressed beyond the point of sanity, Ray attempts one final kamikaze attack on the Gekko with the Spearheads and the Swan.
| 29 | "Keep On Movin'"; Transliteration: "Kīpu On Mūbin" (Japanese: キープ・オン・ムービン) | "Keep On Movin'" by Soul II Soul | Keizō Nakamura | Shōtarō Suga | November 6, 2005 | November 12, 2006 |
Dominic visits Bellforest in order to try to get information on the Thurston family. Meanwhile, Renton is still trying to cope with the Beams' deaths and a startling revelation about Eureka.
| 30 | "Change of Life"; Transliteration: "Chenji Obu Raifu" (Japanese: チェンジ・オブ・ライフ) | "Changes of Life" by Jeff Mills | Takao Abo | Chiaki J. Konaka | November 13, 2005 | November 19, 2006 |
In order to repair and upgrade the Nirvash, which lost armor plates during the military ambush led by Charles and Ray, Gekkostate prepares to land at Tresor, a military research and development facility. While there, Renton learns a bit about Eureka and the typeZERO's pasts, and Talho decides to change, on the inside and outside, along with Holland.
| 31 | "Animal Attack"; Transliteration: "Animaru Atakku" (Japanese: アニマル・アタック) | "Animal Attack" by Fumiya Tanaka | Takefumi Anzai | Hiroshi Ōnogi | November 20, 2005 | November 26, 2006 |
Koda, one of the Sages, descends to the planet to meet with Dewey concerning his Ageha Squad. Meanwhile, the typeZERO rejects its current repairs; in order to design a new outer shell for it, Gekkostate must meet with the eccentric researcher, Dr. Greg "Bear" Egan. When the Ageha Squad tests their new weapon outside Tresor, though, Gekkostate scrambles to finish their business there.
| 32 | "Start It Up"; Transliteration: "Sutāto Itto Appu" (Japanese: スタート・イット・アップ) | "The Start It Up" by Joey Beltram | Kazuya Murata | Yūichi Nomura | November 27, 2005 | December 3, 2006 |
Axel Thurston is tasked with the construction of the Nirvash's new ref board. At the same time, following the devastation left behind by the Coralian attack, the military sends TheEND to observe the Coralians, only to get sidetracked by the Gekko.
| 33 | "Pacific State"; Transliteration: "Pashifikku Suteito" (Japanese: パシフィック・ステイト) | "Pacific State" by 808 State | Shingo Kaneko | Dai Satō | December 4, 2005 | December 10, 2006 |
Gekkostate takes a short break at a popular lifting spot after the destruction caused by the Coralian attack. Renton searches for memorabilia in order to try and cheer up Eureka, while Holland and Talho learn the location of Norb and make plans to assault the capital to rescue him. Meanwhile, Holland and Talho confront the feelings they have for one another.
| 34 | "Inner Flight"; Transliteration: "Innā Furaito" (Japanese: インナー・フライト) | "Inner Flight" by Primal Scream | Hiroshi Haraguchi | Megumi Shimizu | December 11, 2005 | December 17, 2006 |
As the Gekko prepares to make a trajectory flight to the capital, Holland takes Renton aside with Eureka and tells him about his past with Eureka in the SOF (Special Operations Force) and his meeting with Norb in Ciudades del Cielo. Meanwhile, Norb meets with Dewey in the capital and the two debate the future of the planet, and Talho has a secret to reveal to Holland.
| 35 | "Astral Apache"; Transliteration: "Asutoraru Apatchi" (Japanese: アストラル・アパッチ) | "Astral Apache" by Galaxy 2 Galaxy | Ikurō Satō | Shōtarō Suga | December 18, 2005 | January 7, 2007 |
Gekkostate launches a full assault on the capital in order to rescue Master Norb. Dewey dismisses the attack as fruitless, confident that Holland would never find a partner for Eureka. In the midst of the battle, Eureka breaks off with the Nirvash and hides with Renton, unwilling to take more lives. After Talho gets the information on Norb's current position, Holland heads out to retrieve the monk and confronts Dewey in the process.
| 36 | "Fantasia"; Transliteration: "Fantajia" (Japanese: ファンタジア) | "Fantasia" by Cosmic Baby | Yumi Kamakura | Yūichi Nomura | December 25, 2005 | January 14, 2007 |
Following Norb's rescue, the monk advises Holland to hurry and take him to the Vodarac homeland if Renton and Eureka are attracted by their true feelings. Eureka sees Renton repaint over a scratch on the Nirvash and realizes how badly her own face is scarred. In a meeting with Gidget, Eureka becomes determined to try and use makeup to "look pretty for Renton". Meanwhile, Holland takes Renton aside to tell the boy yet another story from his past; the story of his relationship with his first love, Renton's sister, Diane Thurston.
| 37 | "Raise Your Hand"; Transliteration: "Reizu Yua Hando" (Japanese: レイズ・ユア・ハンド) | "Raise Your Hand Together" by Cornelius | Hideki Itō | Hiroshi Ōnogi | January 8, 2006 | January 21, 2007 |
As Gekkostate records an interview with Norb and Dr. Bear in which they discuss the military's plans and the "Limit of Questions" theory, Dewey stages a show of his own for the media and accuses the Council of the Sages of standing idly by while the Coralians assault human civilization. Dewey promises the public hope in the form of the Ageha Squad, using Adroc's name to sway the world.
| 38 | "Date of Birth"; Transliteration: "Deito Obu Bāsu" (Japanese: デイト・オブ・バース) | "Date of Birth" by Date of Birth | Daizen Komatsuda | Dai Satō | January 15, 2006 | January 28, 2007 |
When Renton learns that Eureka knew his father before he died, he becomes upset and the two fail to communicate their feelings properly. The tension between them is misunderstood by the rest of the Gekko's crew, some of whom believe Renton wants to or tried to have sex with Eureka. Meanwhile, at the capital, Dewey finally makes his move against the Council of the Sages.
| 39 | "Join the Future"; Transliteration: "Join Za Fyūchā" (Japanese: ジョイン・ザ・フューチャー) | "Join the Future" by Tuff Little Unit | Yoshito Hata | Shōtarō Suga | January 22, 2006 | February 4, 2007 |
While the Gekko is refueling for the final leg of its journey to the Great Wall, Norb orders Gekkostate to play a game of futsal. Tensions are high on the soccer field as many of the crew question Norb's motives. At the capital, Dewey blames the death of the two Sages on the Coralians and prepares an attack on the Great Wall in retaliation.
| 40 | "Cosmic Trigger"; Transliteration: "Kozumikku Torigā" (Japanese: コズミック・トリガー) | "Cosmikk Trigger" by Cosmic Baby | Kazuya Murata | Hiroshi Ōnogi | January 29, 2006 | February 11, 2007 |
Gekkostate finally arrives at the Vodarac shrine, very near the Great Wall. However, in order to pass through the Great Wall, Norb explains that Renton and Eureka must first infiltrate the shrine and meet with Sakuya, Eureka's predecessor. Dewey orders the deployment of military forces to the Great Wall, including his new flagship, the Ginga.
| 41 | "Acperience 3"; Transliteration: "Akuperiensu 3" (Japanese: アクペリエンス・3) | "Acperience 3" by Hardfloor | Hiroshi Haraguchi | Yūichi Nomura | February 5, 2006 | February 18, 2007 |
Eureka enters the strange lotus bud they find at the core of the Vodarac shrine, and inside finds a library much like the one she found when she nearly merged with the Scub Coral. Inside this library, she meets Sakuya. Norb tells Renton (and Sakuya tells Eureka) the story of how the two fell in love after an earthquake and attempted to pass the Great Wall. Outside, Holland's group defends the shrine against Vodarac soldiers, with the U.F. military approaching fast.
| 42 | "Star Dancer"; Transliteration: "Sutā Dansā" (Japanese: スターダンサー) | "Star Dancer" by The Martian | Ikurō Satō | Megumi Shimizu | February 12, 2006 | February 25, 2007 |
Dewey launches an attack on the Vodarac shrine and uses Orange to summon a Kute-class Coralian. Renton, Eureka, and the kids race towards the Great Wall in the Nirvash, with the Gekko and its LFOs covering them. Amidst the antibody Coralians and Federation ships, Anemone and TheEND launch to pursue typeZERO into the Zone.
| 43 | "The Sunshine Underground"; Transliteration: "Za Sanshain Andāguraundo" (Japanese: ザ・サンシャイン・アンダーグラウンド) | "The Sunshine Underground" by The Chemical Brothers | Takao Abo | Hiroshi Ōnogi | February 19, 2006 | March 4, 2007 |
Renton, Eureka and the children find themselves stranded on humanity's former home, Earth, with no idea where to go or what to do. As Holland boards a new LFO and fights alongside an upgraded Gekko against the military's AFX ships, Dominic kisses Anemone. Afterwards Dewey takes Anemone to a New Year's ball and tells her the story of his childhood. Meanwhile, Dominic is given a new order: to head to Warsaw with Captain Jurgens and the Izumo in order to select the next pilot of TheEND.
| 44 | "It's All in the Mind"; Transliteration: "Ittsu Ōru In Za Maindo" (Japanese: イッツ・オール・イン・ザ・マインド) | "It's All in the Mind" by C. J. Bolland | Hideki Itō | Shōtarō Suga | February 26, 2006 | March 11, 2007 |
Dominic arrives at Warsaw with his orders from the last episode and finds a facility that performs experiments on young girls with desperation disease. However, the experiment ends in the death of all three specimens, and Dominic is forced to inform Dewey that there was no replacement for Anemone. Meanwhile, stress continues to take its toll on Renton's group as they explore Earth, and Eureka's condition grows more dire.
| 45 | "Don't You Want Me?"; Transliteration: "Donto Yū Wonto Mī?" (Japanese: ドント・ユー・ウォント・ミー?) | "Don't You Want Me" by The Human League | Daizen Komatsuda | Yūichi Nomura | March 5, 2006 | March 18, 2007 |
Dominic and Jurgens arrive at Tresor under their orders to capture Gekkostate, but rather than carry them out they demand a talk with Dr. Bear in order to ascertain the truth of Dewey's plan. Meanwhile, Renton chases down Eureka and confronts her about her transformation, with the kids right in the middle.
| 46 | "Planet Rock"; Transliteration: "Puranetto Rokku" (Japanese: プラネット・ロック) | "Planet Rock" by Afrika Bambaataa and the Soulsonic Force | Ikurō Satō | Hiroshi Ōnogi | March 12, 2006 | March 25, 2007 |
Dewey at last discovers the location of the Scub Control Cluster. As the military launches all over the world, ref boarders and DJs relay information on their activities to Tresor. Holland and Jurgens quickly ready their crews for battle. On Earth, Eureka and the kids tend to Renton's fever, and Eureka undergoes yet another transformation.
| 47 | "Acperience 4"; Transliteration: "Akuperiensu 4" (Japanese: アクペリエンス・4) | "Acperience 4" by Hardfloor | Hiroshi Haraguchi | Shōtarō Suga | March 19, 2006 | April 8, 2007 |
Renton reunites with his sister Diane shortly after he, Eureka, and the kids discover the Control Cluster. She tells him the history of Earth and the Scub Corals, leaving him and Eureka to make a very important decision about humanity's future.
| 48 | "Ballet Mechanique"; Transliteration: "Baree Mekanikku" (Japanese: バレエ・メカニック) | "Ballet Mécanique" by Ryuichi Sakamoto | Kazuya Murata | Yūichi Nomura | March 26, 2006 | April 15, 2007 |
Dewey's plans come to fruition as he creates a hole in the Scub Corals, sending Anemone to the Control Cluster to target it for destruction. With the opening closing fast, Dominic tries to find Anemone before she completes her suicidal mission.
| 49 | "Shout to the Top!"; Transliteration: "Shauto Tu Za Toppu!" (Japanese: シャウト・トゥ・ザ・トップ!) | "Shout to the Top!" by The Style Council | Takao Abo | Dai Satō | April 2, 2006 | April 22, 2007 |
The Control Cluster has been destroyed along with TheEND, and the typeZERO is badly damaged. Debris from the destruction of the Oratorio #8 are carried on trapar to towers around the globe, while Dewey enters the Scub Coral to destroy the last hope the world has: Renton, Eureka and the Nirvash. Holland confronts his brother on the Ginga, but Dewey has one last trick, and it may cost Eureka her life...
| 50 | "Wish Upon a Star"; Transliteration: "Hoshi ni Negai o" (Japanese: 星に願いを) | "When You Wish Upon a Star" by Cliff Edwards | Tomoki Kyoda; Ikurō Satō | Dai Satō | April 2, 2006 | April 29, 2007 |
Eureka is becoming the next Control Cluster and all hope seems lost. The Nirvash can't be operated, and surrounding Eureka are millions of antibody Coralians. The Gekko prepares for one last mission, but can Renton summon the strength to save the one he loves?
| "51" | "New Order"; Transliteration: "Nyū Ōdā" (Japanese: ニュー・オーダー) | New Order | Tomoki Kyoda | Yūichi Nomura | April 5, 2012 | N/A |
A special episode that is a non-canonical alternate ending to the show. The script for this special was first performed in 2006 at a Sony Music Festival by the original Japanese voice actors. In March of 2012, Studio BONES decided to put existing footage of the TV series to this audio and air it for the first time on television. Episode 51's alternate ending entails that Eureka must go on a journey to scatter seven pieces of her memories across the land in order to calm it. In the end, Eureka and Renton must part ways, but Renton vows that they will meet again someday, no matter what. Episode 51 has absolutely no relation to Eureka Seven's sequel, Eureka Seven: AO, as this was an ending that was not used for the original TV run of the series, and Eureka Seven: AO continues from the events that happened in episode 50.
