= Eyedress discography =

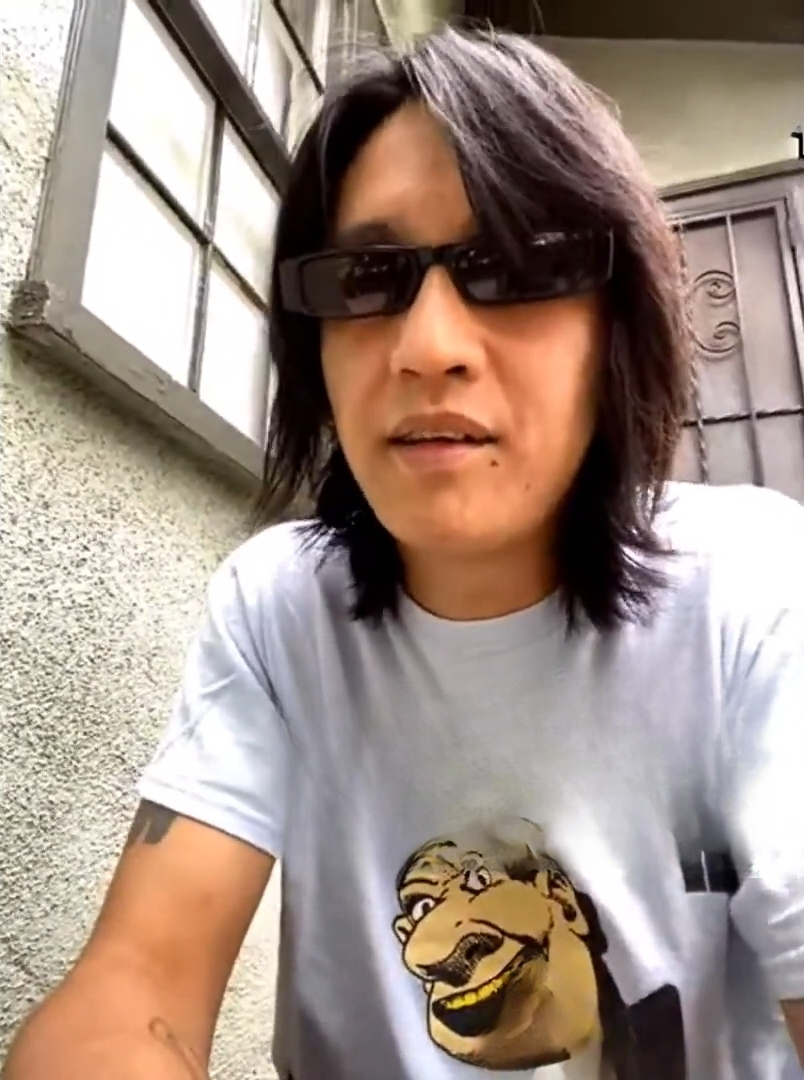
- Eyedress in 2021
- Studio albums: 6
- EPs: 4
- Singles: 53

The discography of Filipino musician Eyedress consists of six studio albums, two collaborative albums, seven mixtapes, four EPs and fifty three singles.

== Albums ==
=== Solo studio albums ===
List of albums with year released, chart positions, and album
Title	Year	Peak chart positions	Certifications
Title	Year	US Heat.	Certifications
Manila Ice	Released: May 12, 2017; Label: Lex; Format: Digital download, streaming, vinyl, compact disc	—	
Sensitive G	Released: November 16, 2018; Label: Lex; Format: Digital download, streaming, double vinyl, compact disc	—	
Let's Skip to the Wedding	Released: August 7, 2020; Label: Lex; Format: Digital download, streaming, vinyl, compact disc	17	AMPROFON: Gold; MC: Gold; RIAA: Gold; ZPAV: Gold
Mulholland Drive	Released: August 27, 2021; Label: Lex; Format: Digital download, streaming, vinyl, compact disc, cassette	—	
Full Time Lover	Released: August 26, 2022; Label: Lex; Format: Digital download, streaming, vinyl, compact disc, cassette	—	
Stoner	Released: April 11, 2025; Label: RCA; Format: Digital download, streaming	—	

=== Collaborative studio albums ===
List of collaborative studio albums with details
Title	Details
Affable With Pointed Teeth (with Yungmorpheus)	Released: October 1, 2021; Label: Lex; Format: Digital download, streaming, vinyl, compact disc, cassette
Siblings (with The Simps & Zzzahara)	Released: February 14, 2022; Label: Lex; Format: Digital download, streaming, vinyl, compact disc, cassette

== Mixtapes and EPs ==
=== Mixtapes ===
List of mixtapes with details
Title	Details
Moisture (with Lofty305)	Released: 2012; Label: Posh Plasma; Format: Digital download
Hearing Colors	Released: April 11, 2014; Label: Abeano, XL; Format: Digital download
Shapeshifter	Released: 2015; Label: Headcount; Format: Digital download
Dark Web DMT (with Lil DMT)	Released: September 6, 2019; Label: Babe Slayer; Format: Digital download
Shroom Tapes, Vol 1 (with Natia)	Released: February 7, 2022; Label: Eyedress Enterprises; Format: Digital download, streaming
The Hills Have Eyes (with YL)	Released: July 14, 2022; Label: Eyedress Enterprises; Format: Digital download, streaming
Committing Crimes	Released: January 20, 2023; Label: Eyedress Enterprises; Format: Digital download, streaming
Vampire In Beverley Hills	Released: April 19, 2024; Label: RCA; Format: Digital download, streaming

=== Extended plays ===
List of extended plays with details
Title	Details
Half Japanese	Released: August 1, 2012; Label: Number Line; Format: Digital download
Supernatural	Released: December 2, 2013; Label: Abeano, XL; Format: Digital download, streaming
Egyptian Night Club	Released: July 27, 2014; Label: Self-released; Format: Digital download, streaming
Don't Dial 911 (with N8Noface)	Released: July 10, 2020; Label: Paranoia; Format: Digital download, streaming

== Singles ==
List of singles with year released, chart positions, and album
Title	Year	Peak chart positions		Certifications	Album
Title	Year	US Rock	LTU	Certifications	Album
"Nature Trips"	2013	—	—		Supernatural EP
"Teen Spirits"	2014	—	—		Non-album singles
"My Hologram"	2014	—	—		Non-album singles
"When I'm Gone" (featuring Georgia)	2014	—	—		Non-album singles
"Where My Girl At?"	2015	—	—		Non-album singles
"Halloween Freak"	2016	—	—		Non-album singles
"Sofia Coppola"	2016	—	—		Manila Ice
"Manila Ice"	2017	—	—		Manila Ice
"Separation Anxiety"	2017	—	—		Manila Ice
"Look Past the Past"	2017	—	—		Manila Ice
"Used to Be Good Friends"	2018	—	—		Manila Ice
"Gwapo Ko Galing Sa'Yo"	2018	—	—		Non-album single
"Cocaine Sunday"	2018	—	—	MC: Gold; RIAA: Gold	Sensitive G
"Be a Better Friend" B/W "No Fun"	2018	—	—		Sensitive G
"Alone Time" B/W "Xenophobic"	2018	—	—		Sensitive G
"Toxic Masculinity"	2018	—	—		Sensitive G
"Stay Calm"	2018	—	—		Sensitive G
"Sensitive G"	2018	—	—		Sensitive G
"I Don't Wanna Be Your Friend"	2019	—	—		Let's Skip to the Wedding
"Trauma"	2019	—	—		Let's Skip to the Wedding
"Jealous"	2019	15	61	AMPROFON: 4× Platinum; ARIA: 2× Platinum; BPI: Platinum; IFPI Austria: Gold; IFPI Finland: Gold; IFPI Norway: Platinum; IFPI Sweden: Gold; IFPI Switzerland: Platinum; MC: 3× Platinum; RIAA: 4× Platinum; RMNZ: Platinum; ZPAV: Platinum	Let's Skip to the Wedding
"Romantic Lover"	2020	44	100	AMPROFON: 2× Platinum; ARIA: Gold; BPI: Silver; IFPI Switzerland: Gold; MC: Platinum; RIAA: 2× Platinum; RMNZ: Gold; ZPAV: Gold	Let's Skip to the Wedding
"Let's Skip to the Wedding"	2020	—	—		Let's Skip to the Wedding
"Can I See You Tonight?"	2020	—	—		Let's Skip to the Wedding
"Skateboarding Day"	2020	—	—		Let's Skip to the Wedding
"Last Time I'm Falling in Love"	2020	—	—		Let's Skip to the Wedding
"Kiss Me Like It's the First Time"	2020	—	—		Let's Skip to the Wedding
"8Ball" (with Natia)	2020	—	—		Non-album single
"On Fye" (with The Simps & Zzzahara)	2020	—	—		Siblings
"Cotton Candy Skies" (with Elvia)	2021	—	—		Non-album single
"Jealous (King Krule Nothing Special Remix)"	2021	—	—		Lex-XX
"Something About You" (featuring Dent May) B/W "Spit on Your Grave"	2021	24	—	AMPROFON: Platinum; ARIA: Platinum; BPI: Silver; IFPI Norway: Gold; IFPI Switzerland: Platinum; MC: 2× Platinum; RIAA: 2× Platinum; RMNZ: Platinum	Mulholland Drive
"Prada" (featuring Triathalon) B/W "Brain Dead"	2021	—	—		Mulholland Drive
"Chad an Gordy" (featuring King Krule)	2021	—	—		Mulholland Drive
"Body Dysmorphia"	2021	—	—		Mulholland Drive
"Tesla" (with The Simps & Zzzahara)	2022	—	—		Siblings
"Rainbow After Rain" B/W "Hold Me Down" (with The Simps & Zzzahara)	2022	—	—		Siblings
"Heavy" (with The Simps & Zzzahara)	2022	—	—		Siblings
"Smoke & Mirrors" (featuring Na-Kel Smith, BoofPaxkMooky & CashCache!)	2022	—	—		Full Time Lover
"House of Cards"	2022	—	—		Full Time Lover
"Still in Love"	2022	—	—		Full Time Lover
"Spaghetti" (featuring Homeshake)	2022	—	—		Full Time Lover
"A Good Life" B/W "2 Headed Goat" (featuring RealYungPhil & Lucien Clarke)	2022	—	—		Full Time Lover
"In the Dog House" (featuring Franky Villani) B/W "Dream Dealer" (featuring Chad Hugo)	2022	—	—		Full Time Lover
"Song 2"	2022	—	—		Non-album single
"House of Cards (Kevin Shields Rainbow Belts Remix)"	2023	—	—		Lex-XX
"Flowers & Chocolate"	2023	—	—		Non-album singles
"Escape From The Killer 2008" B/W "Escape From The Killer 1994"	2023	—	—		Non-album singles
"Teen Mom"	2023	—	—		Non-album singles
"Dark Prince" (featuring Mac Demarco)	2023	—	—		Non-album singles
"My Simple Jeep" (featuring Mac Demarco)	2023	—	—		Stoner
"Separate Ways" (featuring The Marías)	2023	—	—		Stoner
"Sadie Hawkins Prom"	2023	—	—		Non-album singles
"A Room Up In The Sky" (featuring The Marías)	2023	—	—		Non-album singles
"Snowing In LA"	2023	—	—		Non-album singles
"Run The Fade" (with 1999 Write The Future)	2024	—	—		Non-album singles
"Mrs. Valentine"	2024	—	—		Vampire in Beverley Hills
"Drivin'"	2024	—	—		Non-album single
"Occasional Stoner'"	2024	—	—		Stoner
"Satan's Son'" (featuring Matt Sweeney)	2025	—	—		Stoner
"Wassup Rockers'"	2025	—	—		Non-album single

== Other appearances ==
- A Forsaken Lover's Plea by Chuck Strangers (2024) – production on "Illegal"
- Once Upon A Time by Jay Worthy (2025) – production and feature on "Famous Players"
