= Lex-XX =

Compilation album by Various Artists
- Released: 2021–2023
- Recorded: 2004–2022
- Genre: Electronic, hip hop
- Label: Lex
- Producer: Various

Various Artists chronology
Complex (2011)	Lex-XX (2021)

Lex-XX is a compilation of remixes issued by Lex Records in 2021 and 2022 to mark the label's twentieth anniversary. Lex-XX is the third compilation on the label, following Lexoleum (2001-2003) and Complex (2011-2012) each released approximately a decade apart.

Each track from Lex-XX has unique artwork created by Commission Studio and Faux Mec. Artwork for each Track shows a digitally rendered object on a grid. The artwork for the "Gazzillion Ear" remix shows an illustration of a "handful of crystals and USB stick that DOOM used to deliver demos to Lex".

== Background ==
The first Lex-XX remix released was King Krule's remix of Eyedress' sleeper hit track "Jealous". NME described the remix as "dark" and "hypnotic" and quoted King Krule saying the remix was "Recorded in sweat, last summer, for a friend." A video for the remix was released, Alternative Press described it as "surreal" with "a retro video game vibe" where the musicians "set off on a ’90s Nintendo-style skateboard race through a bizarre Minecraft universe."

Boards of Canada began work on their "Treat Em Right" remix in 2016 while working on another remix for Nevermen, but didn't complete it until after they were asked to contribute a remix to Lex-XX. The remix samples Boards Of Canada's 1998 song "Open The Light" from their debut album Music Has The Right To Children.

The "Man On Fire Remix" is the second Thom Yorke remix of "Gazillion Ear". An earlier remix, subtitled "Monkey Hustle Remix" appeared as a bonus track on Born Like This. Thom Yorke named the Lex-XX remix the "Man On Fire Remix". The remix dates to 2009 and Thom had previously played the remix on Benji B's BBC Radio 1 show in 2016.

== Lex-XX track listing ==
Artist	Title	Remixer	Remix subtitle	Release date
Eyedress	"Jealous"	King Krule	Nothing Special	11 March 2021
Kaleida	"Think"	Actress	Tone Two	17 June 2021
Nevermen	"Treat Em Right"	Boards of Canada		2 July 2021
MF Doom	"Gazzillion Ear"	Thom Yorke	Man On Fire	12 August 2021
Golden Rules	"Never Die" (featuring Freddie Gibbs & yasiin bey)	Prefuse 73		20 August 2021
Shape of Broad Minds	"Let’s Go (Space Boogie)" (featuring MF DOOM)	Black Noi$e		18 November 2021
Belief	"I Want To Be"	Haai		22 February 2022
JJ Doom	"Guv'nor"	Chad Hugo		22 August 2022
Fly Anakin & Pink Siifu	"L's" (featuring Fousheé)	Eyedress		26 September 2022
Fly Anakin	"No Dough"	Madlib		17 November 2022
Eyedress	"House of Cards"	Kevin Shields	Rainbow Belts	23 January 2023
Danger Mouse & Jemini	"Born-A-MC"	Danger Mouse		7 June 2024
Prince Po	"Social Distortion" (featuring MF DOOM)	DJ Premier		7 June 2024
