= Complex Volume 1 =

Complex

Compilation album
- Released: 21 April 2012
- Genre: Alternative hip hop, indie rock
- Label: Lex Records
- Producer: Jel, Boom Bip, Danger Mouse

chronology
Lexoleum (2001-2003)	Complex (2012)	Lex-XX (2021-2022)

Professional ratings
Review scores
Source	Rating
Q	4/5 stars
Metro	Positive

Complex is an alternative hip hop compilation album released on Lex Records on 21 April 2012. It compiled the ten tracks that Lex had released digitally to mark its tenth anniversary.

== Recording ==
"Retarded Fren" by MF Doom remixed by Thom Yorke samples Jonny Greenwood's "Proven Lands" from score for There Will Be Blood.

"Wheels" by Neon Neon, was recorded during the Stainless Style studio sessions and completed for the Complex and continues Stainless Style's theme of a fictional biography of John Delorean.

== Track listing ==
1. Jel - "Last Decade" (3:17)
2. Neon Neon - "Wheels" (4:07)
3. JJ Doom - "Rhymin Slang (Dave Sitek Remix)" (2:37)
4. Boom Bip - "Clocked" (4:08)
5. Xeno & Oaklander - "Sets & Lights" (4:47)
6. Stalactite - "Lava Tube" (4:18)
7. MF Doom with Thom Yorke & Jonny Greenwood - "Retarded Fren" (3:17)
8. Danger Mouse & Jemini the Gifted One - "Knuckle Sandwich II" (1:29)
9. Dr. Who Dat? - "Viberian Twilight Part 2" (2:56)
10. Crook & Flail - "Freelance Exist" (3:29)
