= Something About You (Eyedress song) =

Single by Eyedress

from the album Mulholland Drive
- Released: 2 June 2021
- Recorded: 2021
- Genre: Indie rock
- Length: 2:33
- Label: Lex
- Songwriters: Idris Vicuña; Dent May, Jr.
- Producer: Eyedress

Eyedress singles chronology
"Jealous (King Krule Nothing Special Remix)" (2021)	"Something About You" (2021)	"Prada" (2021)

"Something About You" is a song by Filipino musician Eyedress featuring Dent May, released by Lex Records on 2 June 2021 as the first single from his album Mulholland Drive (2021). The song was written and recorded by Idris Vicuña and Dent May. The single was released as a double-a-side single with "Spit On Your Grave". The video for the track was directed by Bobby Astro.

== Reception ==
The A.V. Club noted the "unabashed '70s slow-jam camp of 'Something About You,' complete with a whispered 'so sexy'—delivered totally straight-faced", The Fader wrote "'Something About You' is a smitten indie soft-rock ballad" while Loud and Quiet noted "very little can prepare you for the sleazy French noir porno whispers of 'Dom Perignon' on the happy-go-lucky 'Something About You (feat. Dent May)'."

"Something About You" went viral in the US with Rolling Stone citing the track as the fastest-rising song on American streaming services for the week ending September 23. This was the third Eyedress single to become a viral hit in 2021 with "Jealous" and "Romantic Lover" going viral on TikTok earlier in the year. On 14 December 2021, "Something About You" charted at number thirty one on the Billboard Hot Rock & Alternative Songs chart.

== Charts ==
Chart performance for "Something About You"
Chart (2022)	Peak position
US Hot Rock & Alternative Songs (Billboard)	24

== Certifications ==
Certifications for "Something About You"
Region	Certification	Certified units/sales
Australia (ARIA)	Platinum	70,000^{‡}
Canada (Music Canada)	2× Platinum	160,000^{‡}
Mexico (AMPROFON)	Platinum	140,000^{‡}
New Zealand (RMNZ)	Platinum	30,000^{‡}
Norway (IFPI Norway)	Gold	30,000^{‡}
Switzerland (IFPI Switzerland)	Platinum	20,000^{‡}
United Kingdom (BPI)	Silver	200,000^{‡}
United States (RIAA)	2× Platinum	2,000,000^{‡}
^{‡} Sales+streaming figures based on certification alone.
