= J-Zone =

American rapper

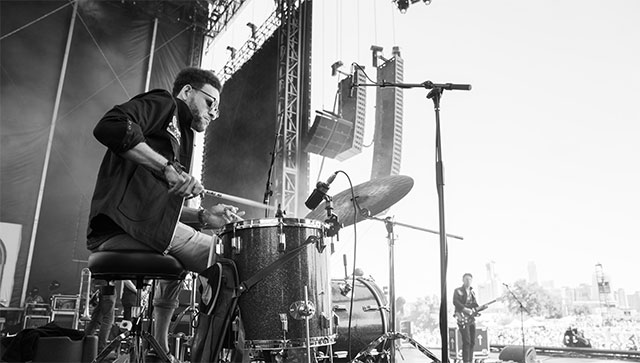
- J-Zone at Austin City Limits in 2022

Background information
- Born: Jarrett A. Mumford; February 26, 1977 (age 49)
- Origin: Queens, New York City, U.S.
- Genres: Hip hop
- Occupations: Record producer; drummer; multi-instrumentalist; rapper; writer
- Years active: 1993–present
- Labels: Old Maid Entertainment; Fat Beats; Redefinition Records
- Website: govillaingo.com

Jay Mumford (born Jarrett A. Mumford; February 26, 1977), known by his former stage name J-Zone, is an American record producer, drummer, multi-instrumentalist, former rapper, and writer from New York City.

== Career ==
Known for his quirky lyrics and trash talk style of rapping, Jay Mumford as "J-Zone" released a string of idiosyncratic and critically acclaimed albums in the late 1990s and early 2000s that acquired a cult following. Of these, the 2001 release Pimps Don't Pay Taxes, was particularly noted; it featured rappers Huggy Bear and Al-Shid, for whom he would subsequently produce a number of 12" releases. In 2003, The New York Times cited his J-Zone, S.A. Smash concert in Brooklyn, New York as a noteworthy pop and jazz concert in the New York metropolitan region.

Not finding commercial success, Jay Mumford as "J-Zone" eventually walked away from rap, and in 2011 published the book Root for the Villain: Rap, Bullshit and a Celebration of Failure. The book has been well received; the Los Angeles Times Music Blog stated that "Like his albums, it's equal parts hilarious, self-effacing and sharp. He's the sarcastic older brother putting you up on game. It's a love letter to rap laced with sulfur, the flip side of Dan Charnas' similarly excellent The Big Payback." The Washington Post Going Out Gurus blog called it "a must for every curmudgeonly grown-up hip-hop head", while Nathan Rabin writing for The A.V. Club called it "one of the funniest and most honest books ever written about the modern music industry and its luckless casualties."

In 2013, Jay Mumford returned to music with the release of the album, Peter Pan Syndrome, which was listed as the 17th best album of 2013 by Spin. After learning to play the drums seriously during his hiatus from music, Jay Mumford released the drum break album, Lunch Breaks, in 2014.

In 2016 Jay Mumford landed a spot playing drums on new tunes from the 1970s funk band Manzel, his band The Du-Rites with Tom Tom Club guitarist Pablo Martin, and for personal drum break kits for Danger Mouse and others.

Jay Mumford has continued working as a session drummer in recent years, appearing on Lord Finesse's Motown State of Mind album in 2020 and rock band Vampire Weekend's single, "Capricorn," in 2024, in addition to his drums being sampled on the 2020 Madlib single, "Road of The Lonely Ones".

In 2022, Jay Mumford was the drummer for live shows and select recordings for The Black Pumas guitarist Adrian Quesada's Boleros Psicodelicos album.

== Discography ==
=== Albums ===
- Music for Tu Madre (1998)
- Pimps Don't Pay Taxes (2001)
- $ick of Bein' Rich (2003)
- A Job Ain't Nuthin but Work (2004)
- Gimme Dat Beat Fool: The J-Zone Remix Project (2005)
- Every Hog Has Its Day (2006) (with Celph Titled, as The Boss Hog Barbarians)
- Experienced! (2006)
- To Love a Hooker: The Motion Picture Soundtrack (2007)
- The Analog Catalog: 2001-2007 (2007)
- Live at the Liqua Sto (2008)
- Peter Pan Syndrome (2013)
- Lunch Breaks (2014)
- Backyard Breaks (2015)
- Fish N' Grits (2016)
- J-Zone and Pablo Martin Are The Du-Rites (2016) (with Pablo Martin, as The Du-Rites)
- Greasy Listening (2017) (with Pablo Martin, as The Du-Rites)
- Guerrilla Drums (2018)
- Gamma Ray Jones (2018) (with Pablo Martin, as The Du-Rites)
- Soundcheck at 6 (2019) (with Pablo Martin, as The Du-Rites)
- Break Bonanza (2019)
- A Funky Bad Time (2020) (with Pablo Martin, as The Du-Rites)
- Concussion Percussion (2021)
- Pressure (2021) (with Pablo Martin, as The Du-Rites)
- Plug It In (2022) (with Pablo Martin, as The Du-Rites)
- Intoxicated Skull (2023)

=== EPs ===
- A Bottle of Whup Ass (2000)
- The Hogs Sing the Hits: Pig Parodies (2006) (with Celph Titled, as The Boss Hog Barbarians)
- The 1993 Demos EP (2013)

=== Singles ===
- "No Consequences" (2000)
- "Zone for President" (2000)
- "Q&A" (2002)
- "5 Star Hooptie" (2003)
- "Choir Practice" (2003)
- "A Friendly Game of Basketball" (2004)
- "Greater Later Remix" (2005)
- "Steady Smobbin'" b/w "Celph Destruction" (2006) (with Celph Titled, as The Boss Hog Barbarians)
- "The Drug Song (Remix)" b/w "The Fox Hunt" (2012)
- "Zonestitution" (2013)
- "Stick Up" b/w "Mad Rap" (2014)
- "I Smell Smoke" b/w "Time for a Crime Wave" (2015)
- "Seoul Power" b/w "I'm Sick of Rap" (2015)
- "Funky" b/w "Go Back to Sellin' Weed" (2016)
- "Bug Juice" b/w "Hustle" (2016) (with Pablo Martin, as The Du-Rites)
- "Bite It" b/w "Bocho's Groove" (2017) (with Pablo Martin, as The Du-Rites)
- "High and Tight" b/w "Standing on Mars" (2017) (with Manzel)
- "Gamma Ray Funk" b/w "Fish Sammich" (2018) (with Pablo Martin, as The Du-Rites)
- "The Mean Machine" b/w "Corinthian Leather" (2018) (with Pablo Martin, as The Du-Rites)
- "Zodiac" b/w "Monster" (2019) (with Pablo Martin, as The Du-Rites)
- "Neckbones (Live)" b/w "Gittin' Sound" (2019) (with Pablo Martin, as The Du-Rites)
- "Mad Dog" b/w "Cheap Cologne" (2019) (with Pablo Martin, as The Du-Rites)
- "Jheri Curl" b/w "Du-Vibrations" (2020) (with Pablo Martin, as The Du-Rites)

=== Guest appearances ===
- Princess Superstar - "I Love You (or at Least I Like You)" from Princess Superstar Is (2001)
- Jehst - "Staircase to Stage" from The Return of the Drifter (2002)
- Danger Mouse & Jemini the Gifted One - "Take Care of Business" from Ghetto Pop Life (2003)
- Apathy & Celph Titled - "Nut Reception" from No Place Like Chrome (2006)

=== Productions ===
- Cage - "In Stoney Lodge" from Movies for the Blind (2002)
- Cage - "Too Much (Remix)" from Weatherproof (2003)
- Biz Markie - "Chinese Food" from Weekend Warrior (2003)
- Leak Bros - "G.O.D." from Waterworld (2004)
- 7L & Esoteric - "Neverending Saga" from DC2: Bars of Death (2004)
- MF Grimm - "Dancin'" from Digital Tears: E-mail from Purgatory (2004)
- R.A. the Rugged Man - "Brawl" from Die, Rugged Man, Die (2004)
- Prince Po - "It's Goin' Down" and "Meet Me at the Bar" from The Slickness (2004)
- Casual - "Say That Then" and "Hieroller" from Smash Rockwell (2005)
- Awol One - "This Far" from The War of Art (2006)
- Juggaknots - "Crazy 8's" from Use Your Confusion (2006)
- Sadat X - "X Is a Machine" from Black October (2006)
- Apathy & Celph Titled - "S.M.D." from No Place Like Chrome (2006)
- Akrobatik - "Absolute Value" from Absolute Value (2008)
- Del the Funky Homosapien - "Funkyhomosapien" from Eleventh Hour (2008)
- The Lonely Island - "Santana DVX" from Incredibad (2009)
- Mr. Lif - "Gun Fight" from I Heard It Today (2009)
- CunninLynguists - "Cocaine" from Strange Journey Volume Two (2009)
- Canibus - "Free Words" from C of Tranquility (2010)

=== As a Sideman ===
- Michael Kiwanuka - "Falling" (Polydor, 2016)
- Broken Bells - "Shelter" (20th Century/Aural Apothecary, 2018)
- Karen O & Danger Mouse - "Lux Prima (Part II)" (30th Century, 2019)
- Lord Finesse / Sisters Love - "Now Is the Time" (Motown, 2020)
- Madlib - "Road of the Lonely Ones" (Madlib Invazion, 2020)
- Adrian Quesada - Boleros Psicodelicos (ATO, 2022)
- Danger Mouse & Black Thought - "Identical Deaths" (BMG, 2022)
- Hermanos Gutierrez - El Bueno Y El Malo (Easy Eye Sound, 2022)
- Greyhounds - Live on 29th Street (29th Street Recordings, 2024)
- Vampire Weekend - "Capricorn" (Columbia, 2024)
- Kelly Finnigan - A Lover Was Born (Colemine, 2024)

== Books ==
- Root for the Villain: Rap, Bullshit, and a Celebration of Failure (Old Maid Entertainment, 2011) ISBN 978-0-615-53227-1
