= Clear Blue Skies =

Clear Blue Skies may refer to:

- The song "Clear Blue Skies" by the English synth-pop group Hot Chip, on the album A Bath Full of Ecstasy.
- The debut album and song by the American hip-hop group Juggaknots, self-titled The Juggaknots but also known as Clear Blue Skies. Later re-released as part of the Re:Release album.
