= Bookhead EP =

EP by JJ Doom
- Released: 24 January 2014
- Genre: Underground hip-hop Alternative hip-hop
- Length: 24:54
- Label: Lex Records

JJ Doom chronology
| Key to the Kuffs (2012) | Bookhead EP (2014) |

Jneiro Jarel chronology
| Key to the Kuffs (2012) | Bookhead EP (2014) | Beyond 2morrow (2014) |

MF Doom chronology
| Key to the Kuffs (2012) | Bookhead EP (2014) | NehruvianDoom (2014) |

Professional ratings
Review scores
| Source | Rating |
|---|---|
| Pitchfork | 8.0/10 |

Bookhead EP is a collaborative EP by alternative hip-hop artists Jneiro Jarel and MF Doom under the moniker JJ Doom. It was released on Lex Records on 17 February 2014. It features nine tracks from the 2013 Butter Edition re-release of Key to the Kuffs. The EP was re-released on vinyl by Lex Records on 22 May 2017.

== Track listing ==
| No. | Title | Length |
|---|---|---|
| 1. | "Bookhead" | 1:59 |
| 2. | "Pause Tape" | 2:06 |
| 3. | "The Signs" (featuring Gone the Hero) | 1:28 |
| 4. | "Viberion Son" (featuring Del the Funky Homosapien) | 3:34 |
| 5. | "Rhymin Slang" (Dave Sitek Remix) | 2:38 |
| 6. | "Guv'nor" (BADBADNOTGOOD Remix) | 2:52 |
| 7. | "Retarded Fren" (Thom Yorke & Jonny Greenwood version) | 3:17 |
| 8. | "Bookfiend" (Clams Casino version) | 2:53 |
| 9. | "Banished" (Beck Remix) | 4:04 |
