= Zig Zaj =

Studio album by Boom Bip
- Released: September 26, 2011
- Genre: Pop
- Length: 49:13
- Label: Lex Records
- Producer: Boom Bip

Boom Bip chronology
Blue Eyed in the Red Room (2005)	Zig Zaj (2011)

Zig Zaj is the third solo studio album by Boom Bip. It was released through Lex Records on September 26, 2011. It features guest appearances from Alex Kapranos, Money Mark, Luke Steele, and Josh Klinghoffer.

== Critical reception ==
Professional ratings
Aggregate scores
Source	Rating
Metacritic	66/100
Review scores
Source	Rating
AllMusic	3.5/5 stars
BBC	favorable
Dusted Magazine	unfavorable
The Phoenix	3/4 stars
Pitchfork	6.6/10

At Metacritic, which assigns a weighted average score out of 100 to reviews from mainstream critics, the album received an average score of 66, based on 10 reviews, indicating "generally favorable reviews".

John Bush of AllMusic gave the album 3.5 stars out of 5, saying, "compared to Seed to Sun or Blue Eyed in the Red Room, whose fascination with sound was positively contagious, Zig Zaj sounds like an overly safe record, the type that most producers would avoid if they wanted to keep innovating."

In 2011, The Guardian included it on the "Top 10 Autumn Albums" list, while Mike Diver of BBC included it on the "Best Albums of September 2011" list.

== Track listing ==
No.	Title	Length
1.	"All Hands"	3:26
2.	"Goodbye Lovers & Friends"	5:20
3.	"Pele"	3:30
4.	"Do as I Do"	5:28
5.	"Reveal"	5:10
6.	"Manabozh"	3:49
7.	"New Order"	4:54
8.	"Automaton"	4:00
9.	"Tumtum"	9:46
10.	"Mascot & the Moth"	3:56
Total length:		49:13

== Personnel ==
Credits adapted from liner notes.

- Boom Bip – music
- Mike Noyce – vocals (1)
- Josiah Steinbrick – acoustic guitar (1), bass guitar (7, 9), synthesizer (7, 9), percussion (7, 9)
- Alex Kapranos – vocals (2)
- Kevin Stevens – drums (2)
- Cate Le Bon – vocals (4)
- Money Mark – vocals (6), effects (6)
- Luke Steele – vocals (7)
- Marty Sataman – synthesizer (7)
- Josh Klinghoffer – guitar (7, 9), synthesizer (7, 9), percussion (7, 9)
- Chris Shaw – mixing
- Ehquestionmark – artwork
