= The Slickness =

- Promo edition cover

Studio album by Prince Po
- Released: July 27, 2004
- Genre: Hip hop
- Length: 42:43
- Label: Lex Records
- Producer: Jel; Madlib; Danger Mouse; Richard X; J-Zone; Prince Po

Prince Po chronology
The Slickness (2004)	Prettyblack (2006)

Singles from The Slickness
- 1. "Hold Dat" Released: 2004; 2. "Bump Bump" Released: 2004

The Slickness is the first solo studio album by Prince Po, one half of American hip hop duo Organized Konfusion. It was released on Lex Records in 2004. It peaked at number 53 on the CMJ Top 200 chart.

== Production ==
80 percent of the album was written at Danger Mouse's house in California. The album's production was handled by Jel, Madlib, Danger Mouse, Richard X, J-Zone, and Prince Po himself.

In a 2005 interview, Prince Po stated that his favorite song on the album was "Be Easy". The song was dedicated to the late Matt Doo, who drew the cover art for Organized Konfusion's Stress: The Extinction Agenda and committed suicide years afterwards.

== Critical reception ==
Professional ratings
Review scores
Source	Rating
AllMusic	3.5/5 stars
Dusted Magazine	favorable
Exclaim!	favorable
HipHopDX	7.5/10
The Irish Times	4/5 stars
MusicOMH	favorable
The Observer	4/5 stars
Pitchfork	7.9/10
Stylus Magazine	C+
XLR8R	favorable

David Jeffries of AllMusic called the album "a victory for all involved." He added: "It's rough and rugged, real and approachable, and you'll have to make plenty of room on your mixtapes for all the highlights within." Jamin Warren of Pitchfork wrote: "Despite a handful of occasional blunders, Po helms an excellent release." DJ Anna of XLR8R commented that "Madlib, Danger Mouse and J-Zone create the background for Po's mesmerizing delivery here, and each track drips with heart and soul as a classic voice collaborates with the best of today's talent." Meanwhile, Dom Passantino of Stylus Magazine wrote: "You just can't help but wonder what it'd be like if he put everything of himself into it."

A single from the album, "Hold Dat", received a favorable review from DJ Shadow. Writing for The New York Times, DJ Shadow said: "Underground rap is finally emerging from its own conservatism and embracing the present, evidenced by the adventurous production on this single from Richard X."

CMJ New Music Monthly placed the album at number 19 on the "20 for 04" list. Tom Dunmore of The Guardian placed it at number 7 on the "Most Beautiful Sleeves of 2004" list.

== Track listing ==
No.	Title	Producer(s)	Length
1.	"Hello"	Jel	2:16
2.	"Too Much"	Madlib	2:55
3.	"Love Thang"	Danger Mouse	3:24
4.	"Hold Dat" (featuring Jemini and Rell)	Richard X	4:08
5.	"It's Goin' Down" (featuring Stone)	J-Zone	2:59
6.	"Social Distortion" (featuring MF Doom)	Danger Mouse	3:08
7.	"The Slickness"	Madlib	2:53
8.	"Grown Ass Man"	Prince Po	3:58
9.	"Bump Bump" (featuring Raekwon)	Madlib	3:23
10.	"Meet Me at the Bar" (featuring J-Ro and J-Zone)	J-Zone	5:09
11.	"Fall Back" (featuring Jemini and Cairo)	Danger Mouse	4:45
12.	"Be Easy"	Prince Po	3:44
Total length:			42:43

CD edition bonus track
No.	Title	Producer(s)	Length
13.	"Hold Dat (Club Remix)" (featuring Jemini and Rell)	Richard X	3:17
Total length:			46:04

== Personnel ==
Credits adapted from the CD edition's liner notes.

- Prince Po – vocals, production (8, 12), mixing (8, 12)
- Jel – production (1)
- Marty Delafongio – mixing (1–3, 7, 9–11), guitar (3)
- Madlib – production (2, 7, 9)
- Carla Holden – extra vocals (3)
- Danger Mouse – production (3, 6, 11), mixing (6), executive production
- Jemini – vocals (4, 11, 13), co-executive production
- Rell – vocals (4, 13)
- Richard X – production (4, 13), mixing (4, 13), remix (13)
- Stone – vocals (5)
- J-Zone – production (5, 10), mixing (5), vocals (10)
- MF Doom – vocals (6)
- Raekwon – vocals (9)
- J-Ro – vocals (10)
- Cairo – vocals (11)
- Ehquestionmark – artwork
- Maya Hayuk – photography
