= Blue Eyed in the Red Room =

Studio album by Boom Bip
- Released: March 8, 2005
- Genre: Pop
- Length: 47:42
- Label: Lex Records
- Producer: Boom Bip

Boom Bip chronology
Seed to Sun (2002)	Blue Eyed in the Red Room (2005)	Zig Zaj (2011)

Blue Eyed in the Red Room is the second solo studio album by Boom Bip. It was released through Lex Records on March 8, 2005. It features guest appearances from Gruff Rhys and Nina Nastasia.

== Critical reception ==
Professional ratings
Aggregate scores
Source	Rating
Metacritic	75/100
Review scores
Source	Rating
Cokemachineglow	66%
Dusted Magazine	favorable
The Guardian	4/5 stars
Pitchfork	7.5/10
PopMatters	8/10 stars
Stylus Magazine	C−
XLR8R	favorable

At Metacritic, which assigns a weighted average score out of 100 to reviews from mainstream critics, the album received an average score of 75, based on 20 reviews, which indicated "generally favorable reviews".

Brian Howe of Pitchfork gave the album a 7.5 out of 10, describing it as "a restful wash of clean, simple lines, unfractured beats, and neon-tinted melodies." He added, "I'm sure the remixes of Blue Eyed in a Red Room will be profligate and terrific; but in this instance, the source material itself is well worth your while." Chet Betz of Cokemachineglow gave the album a rating of 66%, saying, "While not any real cause for concern amongst Boom Bip fans, Blue Eyed in the Red Room is not the masterpiece that they might be hoping for."

== Track listing ==
No.	Title	Length
1.	"Cimple"	5:05
2.	"The Move"	4:40
3.	"Do's & Don'ts" (featuring Gruff Rhys)	6:02
4.	"Girl Toy"	5:26
5.	"Dumb Day"	5:15
6.	"Eyelashings"	6:24
7.	"Soft & Open"	2:20
8.	"One Eye Round the Warm Corner"	5:10
9.	"Aplomb"	3:40
10.	"The Matter (of Our Discussion)" (featuring Nina Nastasia)	3:50
Total length:		47:42

Limited edition CD bonus disc
No.	Title	Length
1.	"Red Room"	13:00

== Personnel ==
Credits adapted from liner notes.

- Boom Bip – music, mixing
- Gruff Rhys – lyrics (3), vocals (3)
- Nina Nastasia – lyrics (10), vocals (10)
- Marty Delafongio – vocal recording (3)
- Paul Bryan – vocal recording (10)
- Robert Curcio – mixing
- Noel Sommerville – engineering, mastering
- Ehquestionmark – artwork
