= A Forsaken Lover's Plea =

Studio album by Chuck Strangers
- Released: March 15, 2024
- Genre: Hip-hop
- Length: 34:00
- Label: Lex Records
- Producer: The Alchemist; Animoss; Eyedress; Graymatter; NV; Obii Say; Chuck Strangers; Zoomo

Chuck Strangers chronology
The Boys and Girls (2023)	A Forsaken Lover's Plea (2024)

A Forsaken Lover's Plea is the second studio album by American rapper and record producer Chuck Strangers. The album was released on March 15, 2024, through Lex Records. Guest appearances include The Alchemist, Remy Banks, Joey Bada$$, Obii Say, and Erick the Architect. The Alchemist and Obii Say also contribute to production on the album alongside Animoss, Eyedress, Graymatter, NV, and Zoomo. The album has received positive reviews from critics who cite it's introspective and personal lyrics about pain and love as well as Strangers' relationship to New York and Hip Hop.

== Reception ==
Online retailer Bandcamp chose this for Album of the Day, where critic Dylan Green praised the "greyscale approach" to Strangers' lyrics, where he "knows how to flex when he needs to—his love of money and faith come up often, and few rappers appreciate the value of a quality bottle of wine like him—but he mostly prefers to show the work it took to get there as plainly as possible" and stated that the "unfussed production" is to the listeners' benefit.

At BrooklynVegan, Andrew Sacher covered this release several times: in a review of new music for the week, he praised this release by writing, "Chuck fills this album with eerie, minimal soundscapes and a quietly commanding lyrical style. Sometimes it sounds like the '90s, other times it sounds like the future." This was also listed among the five best rap albums of March 2024 and among the 30 best albums of the first quarter of 2024.

At HipHopDX, Will Schube gave A Forsaken Lover's Plea a 3.8 out of 5, calling this concept album "a love letter to New York, a chronicle of the pain and ecstasy of a less-than-sturdy romance, and an ode to the wonders of Hip Hop itself", where Strangers "balances the personal with the cosmic, tracing his own relationships and how they reflect the wider world".

In Mojo, Stevie Chick scored this album 4 out of 5 stars, characterizing the music: "having looted various quiet storm nuggets and Isaac Hayes soundtracks for strings, beats and vibes, Stranger's soliloquies on love, drugs and hip-hop deliver a most compelling, modernist strain of the blues".

A Forsaken Lover's Plea was included in Bandcamp's "Best Hip-Hop Albums of 2024" list and Glide Magazine's "Ten Best Rap/Hip Hop Albums of 2024". Writing in Glide, Ryan Dillon stated "After spending years bubbling in the underground and honing his vast array of talents, producer/rapper Chuck Strangers emerged with a statement piece in 2024... Strangers achieved the sought-after balance of employing his influences without sounding anything like them, a lesson a lot of modern Hip-hop could learn from. For Strangers, it’s just another day. The quick yet potent 18-song album has Strangers sounding lively and more confident than on his previous releases, marking a turning point in his artistry."

== Track listing ==
1. "Richard Pryor" – 0:29
2. "Dead Vines" – 2:16
3. "Close Calls" – 2:04
4. "Sermonette" – 2:04
5. "Ski'd Up" – 2:10
6. "Too Afraid to Dance" – 2:13
7. "A Forsaken Lover's Plea" – 2:13
8. "Sunset Park" – 2:14
9. "Polish Jazz" – 3:01
10. "Feelings" – 2:13
11. "Crusaders" – 0:13
12. "To All the Girls" – 0:56
13. "Home" – 1:18
14. "Ali's Roti Shop" – 1:43
15. "Grasp" – 3:44
16. "Some Flatbush..." – 3:21
17. "Count on My Love" – 1:49
18. "Illegal" – 1:25

== Personnel ==
- Chuck Strangers – music, rapping, production on "Richard Pryor", "Dead Vines", "Sunset Park", "Feelings", "Crusaders", "To All the Girls", and "Count on My Love"
- The Alchemist – rapping on "Ski'd Up", production on "Sermonette" and "Ski'd Up"
- Animoss – production on "Too Afraid to Dance", "Polish Jazz", and "Some Flatbush..."
- Joey Bada$$ – rapping on "Polish Jazz"
- Remy Banks – rapping on "Too Afraid to Dance"
- Commission Studio – art direction, design
- Erick the Architect – rapping on "Some Flatbush..."
- Eyedress – production on "Illegal"
- Graymatter – production on "A Forsaken Lover's Plea"
- Jack McKain – photography
- NV – production on "Close Calls" and "Ali's Roti Shop"
- Obii Say – rapping on "Grasp", production on "Grasp"
- Trevor Wright – mixing
- Zeroh – audio mastering
- Zoomo – production on "Home"

== See also ==
- 2024 in American music
- 2024 in hip-hop
- List of 2024 albums
