= Willie Isz =

American hip hop group

- Origin: United States
- Genres: Alternative hip hop
- Years active: 2008–present
- Labels: Lex
- Members: Khujo; Jneiro Jarel

Willie Isz is an American alternative hip hop duo comprising Khujo of Goodie Mob and Jneiro Jarel of Shape of Broad Minds. Their first album Georgiavania was released on Lex Records in 2009.

== Discography ==
=== Albums ===
- Georgiavania (2009, Lex Records)

=== Remixes ===
- Massive Attack - "Atlas Air (Lavender Jungle Remix)" (2009)
- Maxwell - "Pretty Wings (Willie Isz Remix)" (2009)
- TV on the Radio - "Shout Me Out (Willie Isz Remix)" (2009)
- Maximum Balloon feat. Theophilus London - "Groove Me (Remix)" (2010)
