= Born Again (Danger Mouse and Jemini album) =

Studio album by Danger Mouse and Jemini
- Released: August 25, 2023
- Recorded: 2003–2004
- Genre: Hip-hop
- Length: 36:09
- Label: Lex
- Producer: Ain Soph Aur El; Danger Mouse

Danger Mouse and Jemini chronology
Ghetto Pop Life (2003)	Born Again (2023)

Singles from Born Again
- 1. "Brooklyn Bazquiat" Released: August 3, 2023; 2. "Born Again" Released: August 24, 2023

Professional ratings
Review scores
Source	Rating
Mojo	4/5 stars
musicOMH	3.5/5 stars
The Observer	4/5 stars
Record Collector	4/5 stars
The Scotsman	4/5 stars
The Sunday Times	4/5 stars
The Times	4/5 stars

Born Again is the second and final collaborative studio album by Danger Mouse and Jemini. It was released on Lex Records on 25 August 2023. It is the sequel to Ghetto Pop Life which was released 20 years earlier. Born Again is Jemini's only album to be released since then.

The ten tracks were all produced by Danger Mouse. Jemini is the lead vocalist on every song, there are no featured artists on the album.

== Delay ==
Writing in Pitchfork, Nina Corcoran chronicled the timescale between the recording and the release of the album:

"Back in 2003, Danger Mouse and Jemini unveiled their debut full-length together, Ghetto Pop Life, to underground fanfare. The two immediately returned to the studio to hash out new material together, and those recording sessions would culminate in Born Again less than a year later. But the LP was indefinitely shelved, making its release nearly 20 years later the first time these songs will be heard."

According to Spin, the reason for the two decades long delay between recording was "never quite explained". Jemini would later elaborate on the delay, stating Danger Mouse submitted the album to Lex without Jemini's approval while the latter was incarcerated. The resulting disputes over ownership and Jemini's compensation kept the album from releasing until 2023.

== Critical reception ==
Consequence named "Brooklyn Bazquiat" their "Single of the Week" and described the track as "scrappy, braggadocios, and a hell of a lot of fun... with a beat full of bells and whistles and Jemini’s unflinching, swagger-heavy flow".

Sheldon Pearce, talking on NPR podcast All Songs Considered, weighed Born Again against Danger Mouse & Jemini's debut album, finding it "a progression from Ghetto Pop Life in almost every way."

Writing in Variety, Todd Gilchrist described the album as "the best hip-hop record from 2003 you never heard" and continued "Jemini’s versatility as a lyricist and Danger Mouse’s sturdy, imaginative production gives Born Again a timeless quality that’s not just worthy of its predecessor but places it among the top tier of similar releases from the last several years."

Jeremy Allen's review for Record Collector comments on the tone of the lyrical content, saying that listeners can hear "...a reticence and a sense of regret that creeps into the lyrics as Jemini anticipates a lengthy stretch for narcotics misdemeanours... tinged with a sense of sadness for all that wasted time."

== Track listing ==
All lyrics are written by Ain Soph Aur El.

No.	Title	Music	Length
1.	"All I"	Brian Burton; Don Danneman; Tom Dawes	3:22
2.	"Locked Up"	Burton; Lloyd Courtenay; Don Hume; Tony O'Malley	3:54
3.	"Me"	Burton	4:04
4.	"Knuckle Sandwich II"	Burton; Mahmoud Ahmed	1:27
5.	"Born Again"	Burton; Noel Reyes	3:44
6.	"Brooklyn Bazquiat"	Burton	3:50
7.	"Walk The Walk"	Burton; Piero Piccioni	4:10
8.	"Where You From"	Burton	3:59
9.	"Dear Poppa"	Burton; Gianfranco Baldazzi; Sergio Bardotti; Lucio Dalla	3:27
10.	"World Music"	Burton	4:07

== Personnel ==
- Brian Burton – production, engineering
- Ain Soph Aur El – production
- Kennie Takahasi – mixing, engineering
- Joe LaPorta – mastering
