= Key to the Kuffs =

Studio album by JJ Doom
- Released: August 20, 2012
- Recorded: 2010–2012
- Genre: Underground hip-hop; alternative hip-hop
- Length: 42:00
- Label: Lex Records
- Producer: Jneiro Jarel

JJ Doom chronology
Key to the Kuffs (2012)	Bookhead EP (2014)

Jneiro Jarel chronology
Georgiavania (2010)	Key to the Kuffs (2012)	Flora (2014)

MF Doom chronology
Expektoration (2010)	Key to the Kuffs (2012)	Bookhead EP (2014)

Professional ratings
Aggregate scores
Source	Rating
Metacritic	74/100
Review scores
Source	Rating
AllMusic	3.5/5 stars
The A.V. Club	B+
Consequence of Sound	C−
Drowned in Sound	6/10
Fact	3.5/5
NME	4/5 stars
Pitchfork	7.3/10
Resident Advisor	4.0/5
Slant Magazine	3.5/5 stars
XLR8R	7/10

Key to the Kuffs is a collaborative album by alternative hip-hop artists Jneiro Jarel and MF Doom under the moniker JJ Doom. It was released on Lex Records on August 20, 2012.

== Recording ==
Jneiro Jarel produced the music in his studio in New Orleans. Although he and Doom met several times during the recording the bulk of the work was carried out in their respective studios. MF Doom recorded the vocals for the album in London between December 2010 and April 2012.

The album includes guest vocals by Damon Albarn of Blur and Gorillaz, Beth Gibbons of Portishead, Khujo of Goodie Mob and Dungeon Family, and Boston Fielder.

== Release ==
Two alternative versions of tracks from the album were released prior to the album. The tracks were the Doom/Thom Yorke/Jonny Greenwood version of "Retarded Fren" and the Dave Sitek remix of "Rhymin' Slang."

== Critical reception ==
At Metacritic, which assigns a weighted average score out of 100 to reviews from mainstream critics, Key to the Kuffs received an average score of 74% based on 26 reviews, indicating "generally favorable reviews".

The Guardian described Key to the Kuffs as a "killer new album with a spectral guest vocal by Beth Gibbons from Portishead." Spin listed a lyric in "Banished" as one of the best rap lines of 2012. Thom Yorke of Radiohead listed "Guv'nor" as his "single of 2012."

In 2017 Pitchfork wrote that "Key to the Kuffs has aged into excellence in the nearly five years since it first came out."

== Track listing ==
Credits are adapted from the album's liner notes.

All tracks are written by D.Dumile and O.Gilyard except where noted.

No.	Title	Writer(s)	Length
1.	"Waterlogged"		1:51
2.	"Guv'nor"		3:04
3.	"Banished"		3:09
4.	"Bite the Thong" (featuring Damon Albarn)	D.Dumile; O.Gilyard; D. Albarn	3:54
5.	"Rhymin' Slang"		2:20
6.	"Dawg Friendly"		2:38
7.	"Borin Convo"		2:20
8.	"Snatch That Dough"		0:46
9.	"GMO" (featuring Beth Gibbons)	D.Dumile; O.Gilyard; B.Gibbons	4:22
10.	"Bout the Shoes" (featuring Boston Fielder)	D.Dumile; O.Gilyard; B.Fielder	2:34
11.	"Winter Blues"		4:11
12.	"Still Kaps" (featuring Khujo)	O.Gilyard; W.Knighton	1:28
13.	"Retarded Fren"		3:38
14.	"Viberian Sun Pt. II"	O.Gilyard	3:12
15.	"Wash Your Hands"		2:41
Total length:			42:00

== Personnel ==
Credits are adapted from the album's liner notes.

Production

- Jneiro Jarel – production
- Metalfingerz Doom – additional skit arrangement (1–4, 7, 8, 11)

Additional performers

- Shannon Powell – percussion (2)
- Damon Albarn – featured vocals (4)
- Capitol Peoples – outro (6)
- Roderick Skeaping – violin (9)
- Beth Gibbons – featured vocals (9)
- Boston Fielder and Muthawit Orchestra – strings (11)
- Indigo – additional vocals (11, 13)
- Khujo Goodie – vocals (12)

Additional personnel

- Tom Brown – executive production, A&R
- Will Skeaping – A&R
- Who Dat? – mixing (1, 2, 5–8, 10, 12–15)
- Metalfingerz Doom – mixing
- Earl Scioneaux – additional engineering (2, 5, 14), additional mixing (3, 10)
- Stephen Sedgwick – additional mixing (4)
- Drew Brown – additional mixing (9)
- Matt Colton – mastering

Artwork

- Steve Powers – art
- Klaus Thymann – portrait
- DLT – layout

== Charts ==
Chart	Peak position
US Billboard 200	148
US Heatseekers Albums	3
US Independent Albums	24
US Top R&B/Hip-Hop Albums	25
US Tastemaker Albums	17
