= Where the Sidewalk Ends (disambiguation) =

Where the Sidewalk Ends is a 1974 children's poetry collection by Shel Silverstein.

Where the Sidewalk Ends may also refer to:

- Where the Sidewalk Ends (film), a 1950 film noir
- Where the Sidewalk Ends (poem), the title poem of the Silverstein collection
- "Where the Sidewalk Ends", a 1978 song by John Mellencamp from A Biography
- "Where the Sidewalk Ends", a 1991 song by Jim Lauderdale
- Where the Sidewalk Ends, a 2000 album by Disflex6
- "Where the Sidewalk Ends", a 2009 song by I See Stars from 3-D
- "Where the Sidewalk Ends", a 2009 episode of Weeds
