= DC2: Bars of Death =

Studio album by 7L & Esoteric
- Released: July 13, 2004
- Genre: Hip-hop
- Length: 1:00:52
- Label: Babygrande
- Producer: 7L; Apathy; DC the Midi Alien; J-Zone

7L & Esoteric chronology
Dangerous Connection (2002)	DC2: Bars of Death (2004)	Moment of Rarities (2005)

Professional ratings
Review scores
Source	Rating
AllHipHop	3.5/5 stars
HipHopDX	6.5/10
Prefix	5/10
RapReviews	8.5/10

DC2: Bars of Death is the third full-length studio album by American underground hip-hop duo 7L & Esoteric. It was released on July 13, 2004, via Babygrande Records. Beside member DJ 7L, who produced the majority of the album, the rest of the production was handled by Apathy, DC the Midi Alien and J-Zone. It features guest appearances from fellow Army of the Pharaohs members, as well as Killa Tactics, Lord Digga, Main Flow, Rise, Uno The Prophet and Beyonder.

== Track listing ==
No.	Title	Producer(s)	Length
1.	"DC Theme"		0:27
2.	"Ring Music"	7L	2:49
3.	"Loud & Clear"	7L	3:02
4.	"Rise of the Rebel"	7L	3:54
5.	"Rogue Nation"	7L	3:10
6.	"This Is War" (featuring Army of the Pharaohs)	7L	4:12
7.	"Graphic Violence"	7L	2:36
8.	"Neverending Saga"	J-Zone	2:48
9.	"Grace of God" (featuring Rise)	7L	3:07
10.	"Murder-Death-Kill" (featuring Celph Titled)	DC the Midi Alien	2:55
11.	"Battlefield"	7L	4:02
12.	"Touchy Subject" (featuring Uno the Prophet)	7L	3:56
13.	"Deathgrip"	7L	2:34
14.	"So Glorious"	7L	3:12
15.	"Way of the Gun" (featuring Celph Titled, Lord Digga and Apathy)	Apathy	3:35
16.	"Another Way Out"	7L	2:49
17.	"That's Right" (featuring Main Flow and K.T.)	7L	3:59
18.	"Crab Move" (featuring Beyonder)		3:14
19.	"Yell at Us" (featuring Apathy and Celph Titled)		4:31
Total length:			1:00:52

== Personnel ==
- Seamus "Esoteric" Ryan – lyrics (tracks: 2–17), art direction
- Braun "Beyonder" Dugan – additional vocals (track 2), recording & mixing (track 7)
- Vincenzo "Vinnie Paz" Luvineri – additional lyrics (track 6)
- Marcus "Crypt the Warchild" Albaladejo – additional lyrics (track 6)
- Daniel "King Syze" Albaladejo – additional lyrics (track 6)
- Mario "Planetary" Collazo – additional lyrics (track 6)
- Jean "Rise" Myrthil – additional lyrics (track 9)
- Vic "Celph Titled" Mercer – additional lyrics (tracks: 10, 15), recording & mixing (track 15)
- Jamarhl "Uno the Prophet" Crawford – additional lyrics (track 12)
- Reginald "Lord Digga" Ellis – additional lyrics (track 15)
- Chad "Apathy" Bromley – additional lyrics & producer (track 15)
- Jermaine "Main Flow" Manley – additional lyrics (track 17)
- Anthony "Killa Tactics" Mosley – additional lyrics (track 17)
- Todd Spadafore – bass (tracks: 3–6, 11)
- George "7L" Andrinopoulos – scratches, producer (tracks: 2–7, 9, 11–14, 16–17), mixing (tracks: 1–6, 9, 11–14, 16–19), art direction
- Jay "J-Zone" Mumford – producer, recording & mixing (track 8)
- Darryl "DC the Midi Alien" Christy – producer (track 10)
- James "DJ Chaos" McEwan – recording (tracks: 1–6, 9, 11–14, 16–19)
- Bob Nash – recording & mixing (track 10)
- Charles "Chuck" Wilson Jr. – executive producer
- Trevor "Karma" Gendron – art direction, design, layout
- Lewis Holiday – photography
