= Warm Blanket =

Studio album by Dent May
- Released: August 27, 2013
- Length: 40:30
- Label: Paw Tracks

Dent May chronology
Do Things (2012)	Warm Blanket (2013)	Across the Multiverse (2017)

Professional ratings
Aggregate scores
Source	Rating
Metacritic	70/100
Review scores
Source	Rating
AllMusic	4/5 stars

Warm Blanket is the third studio album by American singer-songwriter Dent May. It was released in August 2013 under Paw Tracks.

== Accolades ==
Publication	Accolade	Rank	Ref.
Obscure Sound	Top 50 Albums of 2013	23	

== Track listing ==
No.	Title	Length
1.	"Turn Up the Speakers"	1:17
2.	"Let Them Talk"	4:28
3.	"Born Too Late"	4:41
4.	"Yazoo"	3:44
5.	"Corner Piece"	4:26
6.	"Do I Cross Your Mind?"	4:06
7.	"It Takes a Long Time"	3:31
8.	"I'm Ready to Be Old"	2:14
9.	"Endlessly"	5:10
10.	"Found a Friend"	3:33
11.	"Summer Is Over"	3:20
