= Jneiro Jarel =

American singer and music producer

- Also known as: Dr. Who Dat?; Capital Peoples; Panama Blaque; Rocque Wun; Mel Owens; JJ Tron; Gwizzo; Phish Bone
- Born: Omar Jarel Gilyard; Brooklyn, New York City, U.S.
- Genres: Hip hop
- Occupations: Producer; composer; rapper; vocalist; DJ; multi-instrumentalist
- Instruments: Sampler; drum machine
- Years active: 1989-present
- Labels: Lex; Label Who?; Ropeadope; Kindred Spirits; Alpha Pup
- Formerly of: JJ Doom
- Website: www.jneirojarel.com

Omar Jarel Gilyard, known by his stage name Jneiro Jarel, is an American recording artist, music producer, composer, and DJ. Recognized for his versatile, abstract, and often experimental style, he is also known for his beat-making alias Dr. Who Dat? and his groups Willie Isz, JJ Doom, and Shape of Broad Minds. He has collaborated with artists such as Damon Albarn, Count Bass D, Massive Attack, TV on the Radio, and Kimbra.

== History ==
Jarel was born in Brooklyn. He spent several years of his life living in Maryland, Arizona, Atlanta and Houston, before eventually moving back to New York City. It was in New York that he started his own label, Orienj Recordings (now Label Who?), and released his first EP as a solo artist.

In 2003 he signed to indie record label Kindred Spirits, and was the sole representative from New York to participate in and perform at Red Bull Music Academy in Cape Town, South Africa.

In 2004 Jneiro moved to Philadelphia and, through his success in the indie music scene, was able to work with some of the city's most influential artists King Britt and Rich Medina.

He signed a multi-album record deal with Lex Records in 2006.

== Career ==
=== 2000–2005: Early career ===
Following the 2000 release of his Section A EP, Jneiro also released his first full-length album, Timeless Volume 1 in 2004, via Label Who? Over the next year he made a number of guest appearances and contributions on various projects, and release several promo singles and DJ mixes, before jointly releasing his Three Piece Puzzle LP on, both, Kindred Spirits and Ropeadope Records in 2005. The album was universally met with positive reception.

=== 2006–2011: Lex Records and mainstream recognition ===
2006 marked the beginning of Jarel's relationship with Lex Records, and saw the release of his critically acclaimed instrumental project, Beat Journey, under his Dr. Who Dat? alias. The album cover art was designed by the UK based graphic artists collective, and frequent Lex Records collaborators, Ehquestionmark, best known for their previous work on The Mouse and the Mask and Ghetto Pop Life. The aesthetic approach featured in Beat Journey's art design would become a staple in Jneiro's future releases.

He followed up Beat Journey with his 2007 Lex release, Craft of the Lost Art, under the group name Shape of Broad Minds. Like many of his previous works, Craft of the Lost Art saw Jarel incorporating several of his aliases on to the album, although this was the first time they would all converge in one place. In addition to fellow group member and emcee Jawwaad Taylor, the project also included a number of features from MF Doom, Count Bass D, Stacy Epps and John Robinson. Craft of the Lost Art widely received positive reviews, and saw Jneiro teaming with Ehquestionmark once more, for an artwork design that included a limited edition, glow-in-the-dark LP, as well as an EP, single and mixtape download.

In early 2009 he revisited his Dr. Who Dat? alter ego for the digital-only release of Beyond 2morrow. This instrumental EP would showcase the more experimental approach to production that was previously, but briefly, explored in some of Jneiro's earlier work. Having been fully realized and embraced on this project, it would also help in solidifying his place among a growing musical genre that would later become popular in the Low End Theory and L.A. beat scene.

That same year Jneiro teamed with Goodie Mob's Khujo Goodie to form the group Willie Isz. They released their debut project Georgiavania on June 15, 2009, via Lex Records. The album features backing vocals from Tunde Adebimpe of TV on the Radio, and continued the string of positive reception Jarel's work had come to know. It would also set the stage for a number of collaborations between Jarel and TV on the Radio's Dave Sitek.

In 2010, Jarel signed a digital distribution deal with Alpha Pup Records, which resulted in the release of his Android Love Mayhem- EP and the reissue of Beyond 2morrow, as Jneiro Jarel. Artwork for both EP's was handled by painter and muralist, and Three Piece Puzzle album cover designer, Joshua Mays.

Jneiro also joined forces with Kindred Spirits again and released the Brazilian themed album Fauna.

All three projects had heavy electronic overtones in their production, and continued to show Jarel's willingness to move away from more traditional sample based music, and explore beyond the rigid boundaries set in place by many musical genres.

In 2011 Jneiro was handpicked by Damon Albarn to be a part of the, newly established, musical collective DRC Music (Democratic Republic of the Congo Music) group. Working in conjunction with Oxfam, the project's intention was to bring awareness to Oxfam's relief work in Congo, as well as give exposure to over fifty local Congolese musicians. Albarn assembled a team of ten producers, composed of Jarel, Dan the Automator, XL Recordings managers Richard Russell and Rodaidh McDonald, Kwes, Actress, Totally Enormous Extinct Dinosaurs, Marc Antoine, Alwest, and Remi Kabaka Jr. to work alongside local musicians in Kinshasa. The result was Kinshasa One Two; an album recorded in five days, with all of its proceeds going towards Oxfam. It was released on Warp Records October 3, 2011.

=== 2012–present: JJ Doom and Label Who ===
On December 16, 2011, a Dave Sitek remix of a JJ Doom track, titled "Rhymin' Slang", was posted on Pitchfork. JJ Doom was revealed to be the pairing of Jneiro Jarel and Lex label mate MF Doom, which drew speculation at the time that the two were working on an album together. This suspicion was confirmed when Pitchfork later ran an article on February 16, 2012, detailing the album's title, Key to the Kuffs, and leaked one of its tracks "Banished". A third track from the album, "Guv'nor", was posted on Pitchfork July 27, 2012.

Key to the Kuffs was released August 20, 2012 on Lex Records. Debuting at number 124 on the Billboard 200, Key to the Kuffs received notable positive praise, eventually charting a total of six Billboard charts and landing on several "Best Albums of 2012" lists. It had a number of high-profile guest appearances, from previous Jneiro Jarel collaborators Damon Albarn and Khujo Goodie, to Beth Gibbons of Portishead.

A video for the song "Guv'nor" premiered August 23, 2012. Directed by Ninian Doff and presented by RizLab, the video garnered attention for its use of an optical illusion/split-screen visual effect. Later a video for the "Rhymin' Slang (JJ Tron Remix)" would be released, as an extension of the JJ Doom/RizLab project.

The album artwork for Key to the Kuffs was designed by American graffiti artist Stephen "ESPO" Powers. Powers would also later direct the music video for JJ Doom's "Bookhead". The video premiered June 19, 2013 and the track was featured on the expanded, deluxe edition of Key to the Kuffs, titled Key to the Kuffs (Butter Edition), released August 20, 2013. The "Butter Edition" also included the Dave Sitek "Rhymin' Slang" remix, as well as the previously released, alternative version of "Retarded Fren" by Radiohead's Thom Yorke and Jonny Greenwood. It also featured a number of guest contributions in the form of remixes, features and alternative versions from Beck, BadBadNotGood, Del the Funky Homosapien and Clams Casino.

In August 2013, Jneiro Jarel announced (via Okayplayer) the official launch of his own record label, Label Who, with Ropeadope Records serving as digital distributor.

== Personal life ==
Jarel is married to Indigo.

== Discography ==
=== Jneiro Jarel ===
- Section A (2000)
- Timeless Vol. 1 (2004)
- Three Piece Puzzle (2005)
- "Big Bounce Theory" b/w "Quantum Leap" (2005)
- Fauna (2010)
- Android Love Mayhem EP (2010)
- "Amazonica" b/w "See Them Cry" (2010)
- Beyond 2morrow reissue (2010)
- Flora (2014)
- After A Thousand Years (2020)

=== Dr. Who Dat? ===
- Beat Journey (2006)
- Rhyme Cycle EP (2006)
- Beyond 2morrow (2009)

=== Shape of Broad Minds ===
- Blue Experience EP (2007)
- Craft of the Lost Art (2007)
- Raiders Of The Lost Mix (2007)
- "OPR8R" (2008)

=== Willie Isz ===
- Georgiavania (2009)

=== Capital Peoples ===
- Amazonica (1999-2004) (2009)

=== DRC Music ===
- Kinshasa One Two (2011)

=== JJ Doom ===
- Key to the Kuffs (2012)
- Rhymin Slang (JJ Tron Remix) EP Very limited exclusive blue 12' vinyl. (2012)
- Rhymin Slang (JJ Tron Remix) flexi-disc 7 Exclusive single face flexi-disc vinyl sold with #24 Wax Poetics Japan. (2012)
- Key to the Kuffs (Butter Version) (2013)
- Bookhead EP (2014)

=== Productions ===
- "Choklit Ninja" by Rich Medina on Connecting The Dots (2005)
- "Rhyme Cycle" by Stacy Epps on Ruff Draft (2007)
- "The Experiment" "Vocal Overload" by John Robinson on I Am Not For Sale (2008)

=== Remixes ===
- "Yellow Daisies (Jneiro Jarel Remix)" by Fertile Ground on Remixes 01 (2005)
- "Holdin' On (Dr. Who Dat? Remix)" by Champion Souls on Holdin' On EP Two (2005)
- "Vibes From THe Tribe (Jneiro Jarel Remix)" by Build An Ark on Remixes (2005)
- "Dust (Rocque Wun Mix)" by Recloose on Dust (Remixes) (2005)
- "My Affection" by Vassy on My Affection (2005)
- "My Juvenile (Jneiro Jarel's Minimal Animal Remix)" by Björk (2009)
- "Pretty Wings (Jneiro Jarel's Willie Isz Remix)" by Maxwell (2009)
- "Gazzilion Ear (Dr. Who Dat? Remix)" by Doom on Gazzillion Ear EP (2009)
- "Gazzilion Ear (Jneiro Jarel feat. Dave Sitek Remix)" by Doom on Gazzillion Ear EP (2009)
- "Harmony Korine (David A. Sitek and Jneiro Jarel Magnetized Nebula Mix)" by Steven Wilson (2009)
- "Shout Me Out Remix" by TV on the Radio on Crying (2009)
- "Balada 45 (Like A Brazilian Girl Remix)" by Arthur Verocai (2010)
- "Electric Love (Jneiro Jarel Remix)" by Vikter Duplaix on Electric Love-EP (2010)
- "Atlas Air (Jneiro Jarel's Lavender Jungle Remix)" by Massive Attack on Atlas Air EP (2010)
- "Groove Me (Jneiro Jarel Remix feat. Theophilus London)" by Maximum Balloon on Maximum Balloon (2010)
- "Messin' (Jneiro Jarel Remix)" by Amatus (2014)
- "90s Music (Jneiro Jarel Remix)" by Kimbra on 90s Music EP (2014)

=== Mixes ===
- "Mindgames (Sneaky Pete Edit)" by Rich Medina (2004)

=== DJ Mixes ===
- Houston We Have A Solution (2005)
- Andrew Meza's BTS Radio Mix (2007)
- Return of The Shoegaze (2008)
- Jneiro Jarel aka Dr. Who Dat's BBC Radio 1 Mary Anne Hobbs Mix (2009)
- BBC Radio 1 Rob Da Bank JJ DOOM Mix (2012)
- Exclusive JJ DOOM Mixtape for Dazed Digital (2012)
- Traptronic Dreams Mixtape (2012)
- Jneiro Jarel x Bonafide Beats Mix #50 (2014)
- Echoes In Viberia (Kimbra Mixtape) By Jneiro Jarel (2014)

=== Guest appearances ===
- "Lookin' At Me" by Kid Sublime on Basement Soul (2005)
- "Not Tomorrow But" "No Game" by Breakthrough on Breakthrough (2005)
- "Choklit Ninja" "Blues Baby" "Weight" by Rich Medina on Connecting The Dots (2005)
- "Chea Chea" by King Britt on Jazzmental (2005)
- "Eyes And Ears" by Ohmega Watts on Watts Happening (2007)
- "Evil Child" by Cilla K. on Evil Child (2010)

=== Compilation appearances ===
- "Sun Walkers" "Eeee Love" "Do You Thang" on Soul Purpose Is To Move You: Kindred Spirits Collection (2004)
- "Sun Walkers" "Doinis!!" on Witness Future Vintage (Vol. 1) (2004)
- "Doinis!!" on Undercover Cuts 21 (2005)
- "Soul Starr" "Big Bounce Theory" "Get Yuh Own" on Rush Hour Mixed Series Vol.01 (2005)
- "Lookin' At Me" on Habitat Collection: Fireside (2005)
- "Lookin' At Me" on Jimmy Woo One (2006)
- "Big Bounce Theory Part 2" on Witness Future Vintage (Vol. 2) (2007)
- "Picante" on Basement Soul (2007)
- "Rhymin' Slang (Dave Sitek Remix)" "Viberian Twilight Part 2" on Complex Vol. 1 (2012)
