= Mulholland Drive (album) =

Studio album by Eyedress
- Released: August 27, 2021
- Genre: Post-punk; indie; funk; R&B
- Length: 39:00
- Label: Lex
- Producer: Eyedress; John Maus; King Krule; Dâm-Funk

Eyedress chronology
Let's Skip to the Wedding (2020)	Mulholland Drive (2021)	Siblings (with The Simps) (2022)

Singles from Mulholland Drive
- 1. "Something About You" b/w "Spit On Your Grave" Released: June 9, 2021; 2. "Prada" b/w "Brain Dead" Released: July 1, 2021; 3. "Chad An Gordy" Released: July 29, 2021; 4. "Body Dysmorphia" Released: August 27, 2021

Mulholland Drive is the fourth studio album by Filipino singer-songwriter Eyedress, released on August 27, 2021, through Lex Records. Unlike previous Eyedress albums, Mulholland Drive features guest producers and artists on the majority of the tracks.

The album sleeve was created by design collective Brain Dead. Mulholland Drive includes a track named "Brain Dead". Eyedress held a launch party for Mulholland Drive at the Brain Dead Studios on August 23, a movie theatre in the Fairfax District, Los Angeles, and also used the same location to film a video for the track "Chad An Gordy".

To promote the album Eyedress appeared on the cover the July 2021 issue of Alternative Press Magazine and co-hosted the Travis Mills Show on Apple Music 1 on September 14, playing the whole album and talking through the album track by track.

Shortly after the album release, "Something About You" went viral in the US with Rolling Stone citing the track as the fastest-rising song on American streaming services for the week ending September 23, and was certified Gold in the USA in May 2022 and platinum in October 2023.

== Reception ==
In a positive review BrooklynVegan described the album as a collection of "catchy, melted pop songs", The A.V. Club said the songs "range from lo-fi R&B ('Prada') to aggressive and distorted post-punk ('Brain Dead'), on through to the unabashed '70s slow-jam camp of 'Something About You,' complete with a whispered 'so sexy'—delivered totally straight-faced", The Fader wrote "'Something About You' is a smitten indie soft-rock ballad" while Loud and Quiet noted "very little can prepare you for the sleazy French noir porno whispers of 'Dom Perignon' on the happy-go-lucky 'Something About You (feat. Dent May)'."

Writing in Billboard, Joe Lynch highlighted album track "Body Dysmorphia" describing it as a "dreamy, gauzy afternoon haze... a gorgeous cut from new album Mulholland Drive that seems written to answer the question, 'What would it sound like if the Cure did a shoegaze song?' The answer: just like this—which is to say, just like heaven."

== Track listing ==
Mulholland Drive track listing
No.	Title	Writer(s)	Producer(s)	Length
1.	"Mulholland Drive"	Idris Vicuña; John Maus	John Maus	2:16
2.	"Midnight on a Sunny Day" (featuring Bee Eyes)	Vicuña; Julius Valledor	Eyedress	2:43
3.	"Something About You" (featuring Dent May)	Vicuña; Dent May, Jr.	Eyedress	2:33
4.	"Long Nights at the 711"	Vicuña	Eyedress	1:16
5.	"Fulfill the Dream" (featuring Vex Ruffin)	Vicuña; Ryan Africa	Eyedress	1:36
6.	"Spit on Your Grave"	Vicuña	Eyedress	1:39
7.	"Brain Dead"	Vicuña	Eyedress	2:25
8.	"Dancing with My Demons" (featuring Paul Cherry)	Vicuña; Paul Cherewick	Eyedress	3:42
9.	"Body Dysmorphia"	Vicuña	Eyedress	2:05
10.	"Want You There Tomorrow"	Vicuña	Eyedress	2:13
11.	"Chad an Gordy" (featuring King Krule)	Vicuña; Archy Marshall	King Krule	2:10
12.	"Ride or Die" (featuring Satchy)	Vicuña; Satchell Brown	Eyedress	3:59
13.	"Keep It Real with You" (featuring Elvia and Dâm-Funk)	Vicuña; Damon Riddick; Elvia Padron	Dām-Funk	2:43
14.	"You Know Me"	Vicuña	Eyedress	3:32
15.	"Prada" (featuring Triathlon)	Vicuña; Adam E Intrantor; Chad Scott Chilton; David Hunter Jayne	Eyedress	4:21
Total length:				39:00
