= Prettyblack =

Studio album by Prince Po
- Released: August 8, 2006
- Genre: Hip hop
- Length: 49:35
- Label: Nasty Habits Entertainment; Traffic Entertainment Group
- Producer: Finale; Prince Po; Madlib; C.J.; Large Professor; Soulsearchin; Rockwilder; Ammoncontact; Brisk

Prince Po chronology
The Slickness (2004)	Prettyblack (2006)	Saga of the Simian Samurai (2007)

Singles from Prettyblack
- 1. "Holla" / "Mecheti Lightspeed" Released: 2006

Prettyblack is the second solo studio album by Prince Po, one half of American hip hop duo Organized Konfusion. It was released on Nasty Habits Entertainment and Traffic Entertainment Group in 2006.

== Critical reception ==
Professional ratings
Review scores
Source	Rating
Cyclic Defrost	mixed

Lyndon of Cyclic Defrost gave the album a mixed review, stating that "[Prince Po's] gruff voice is immediately arresting on [the album's] opening tunes, but further on, the vocal stylings seem to meander into uninspiring territory, not taking the listener to anywhere new or dynamic."

== Track listing ==
No.	Title	Producer(s)	Length
1.	"Intro"	Finale	1:24
2.	"Prettyblack"	Prince Po	3:05
3.	"Mecheti Lightspeed"	Madlib	2:42
4.	"Ask Me" (featuring 2Mex)	C.J.	3:22
5.	"Right 2 Know" (featuring Chas West)	Large Professor	3:23
6.	"Holla (L. Boogie's Theme)" (featuring Presto and C.J.)	Prince Po	3:33
7.	"Feel It 4 U"	Soulsearchin	3:11
8.	"Breaknight"	Rockwilder	2:17
9.	"Family"	Prince Po	2:43
10.	"Purple Kush Ritual" (featuring China Black)	Ammoncontact	3:08
11.	"Creep on It"	C.J.	2:40
12.	"Intalude"		1:34
13.	"U Right Hear (J. Dilla Tribute)" (featuring Concise Kilgore)	Prince Po	4:25
14.	"The City Sleeps"	Brisk	4:24
15.	Untitled		7:44
Total length:			49:35

== Personnel ==
Credits adapted from the CD edition's liner notes.

- Prince Po – vocals, production (2, 6, 9, 13)
- Finale – production (1)
- Madlib – production (3)
- 2Mex – vocals (4)
- C.J. – production (4, 11), vocals (6)
- Chas West – vocals (5)
- DJ Rhettmatic – turntables (5)
- Large Professor – production (5)
- Presto – vocals (6)
- Soulsearchin – production (7)
- Touchem Black – additional vocals (8)
- Rockwilder – production (8)
- China Black – vocals (10)
- Ammoncontact – production (10)
- Concise Kilgore – vocals (13)
- Brisk – production (14)
