= Peter Pan Syndrome (album) =

Studio album by J-Zone
- Released: September 3, 2013
- Studio: Jamaica, Queens
- Genre: Alternative hip hop
- Length: 54:48
- Label: Old Maid Entertainment
- Producer: J-Zone

J-Zone chronology
Live at the Liqua Sto (2008)	Peter Pan Syndrome (2013)	Lunch Breaks (2014)

Singles from Peter Pan Syndrome
- 1. "The Drug Song (Remix) / The Fox Hunt" Released: 2012

Professional ratings
Review scores
Source	Rating
The Boombox	favorable
Exclaim!	8/10
Impose	mixed
Pitchfork	7.5/10
Spectrum Culture	3.25/5
XXL	XL

Peter Pan Syndrome is a studio album by American hip hop artist J-Zone. It was released on Old Maid Entertainment on September 3, 2013.

== Critical reception ==
Nate Patrin of Pitchfork gave the album a 7.5 out of 10, saying, "J-Zone's aggravated flow and stand-up-ready delivery lends itself to some sharp observations on class struggle, gentrification, and the travails of thwarted upward mobility." He added, "Peter Pan Syndrome is such a focused and niche-satisfying record that it likely wouldn't work worth a damn if J-Zone didn't have his heart in it, but in what appears to be a welcome 180, he goes off and performs like somebody who's never been burned by the business." Aaron Matthews of Exclaim! gave the album an 8 out of 10, saying, "it's his honest, sharp and funny writing that makes Peter Pan Syndrome one of the first rap records to capture life in this decade."

Spin listed it as the 17th best hip-hop album of 2013. Impose included it on the "Best Albums of 2013" list.

== Track listing ==
No.	Title	Length
1.	"It's a Trap!"	2:36
2.	"R.A.'s Career Advice"	0:30
3.	"Gadget Ho"	2:09
4.	"Molotov Cocktail"	2:35
5.	"Opposites Attract" (featuring Al-Shid)	2:52
6.	"Miscegenation on Ya Station!"	1:19
7.	"Crib Issues"	1:44
8.	"Jackin for Basquiats"	1:24
9.	"The Drug Song (Remix)"	2:53
10.	"Player Potion" (featuring Chief Chinchilla)	1:27
11.	"Hog Slop" (featuring Celph Titled)	3:30
12.	"Rap Baby Boomers"	2:51
13.	"An Honest Day's Robbery" (featuring Has-Lo)	5:12
14.	"Gimme a Hit"	2:27
15.	"Trespasser"	2:34
16.	"Black Weirdo"	3:08
17.	"The Fox Hunt" (featuring Breeze Brewin)	3:11
18.	"Roaches in the Kitchen"	2:16
19.	"Peer Pressure"	0:54
20.	"Peter Pan Syndrome"	3:52
21.	"No Plan A"	2:48
22.	"Mo' Pork" (featuring Swagmaster Bacon)	2:36
