= Ghetto Pop Life =

2003 studio album by Danger Mouse and Jemini

Studio album by Danger Mouse and Jemini
- Released: September 9, 2003
- Genre: Hip-hop
- Length: 57:24
- Label: Lex
- Producer: Danger Mouse

Danger Mouse and Jemini chronology
Ghetto Pop Life (2003)	Born Again (2023)

Professional ratings
Review scores
Source	Rating
AllMusic	4/5 stars
BBC - Collective	8/10
Dusted Magazine	favorable
IGN	8.5/10
musicOMH	4/5 stars
Muzik	4/5 stars
Pitchfork	7.8/10
Prefix	6/10 stars
Stylus Magazine	A
XLR8R	favorable

Ghetto Pop Life is the debut collaborative studio album by Danger Mouse and Jemini. It was released on Lex Records in 2003. It features guest appearances from tha Liks, J-Zone, Prince Po, and the Pharcyde. In 2004, a reprint of the album with three additional tracks was released in the United States.

Lex Records also released three EPs with tracks (and remixes of tracks) from the album: Take Care of Business, Conceited Bastard, and 26 Inch EP. Moreover, there was a special promotional CD, titled Ghetto Pop Mix, a mixtape with short remixes of the tracks from the album fading into each other, along with a couple of new exclusive tracks.

== Critical reception ==
Mark Pytlik of AllMusic gave the album 4 stars out of 5, saying: "Evocative without being pointlessly nostalgic and fun without being goofy, Ghetto Pop Life is a convincingly strong debut." Dom Passantino of Stylus Magazine gave the album a grade of "A", calling it "not only one of the best albums of the year, but also possibly the strangest."

Pitchfork placed it at number 37 on the "Top 50 Albums of 2003" list. The Guardian named it the 19th best album of 2003. In 2011, inthemix named it the 48th best dance album of the 2000s. In 2017, ThoughtCo included it on the "100 Best Hip-Hop Albums of the 2000s" list.

== Track listing ==
No.	Title	Length
1.	"Born-A-MC"	2:29
2.	"Ghetto Pop Life Intro"	1:09
3.	"Ghetto Pop Life"	4:23
4.	"Omega Supreme"	5:03
5.	"What U Sittin' On?" (featuring Tha Liks)	3:58
6.	"The Only One"	3:17
7.	"Take Care of Business" (featuring J-Zone)	3:38
8.	"That Brooklyn Shit"	3:35
9.	"Yoo-Hoo!"	4:35
10.	"Copy Cats" (featuring Prince Po)	3:49
11.	"Don't Do Drugs"	3:23
12.	"Medieval" (featuring The Pharcyde)	4:59
13.	"Bush Boys"	4:01
14.	"Here We Go Again"	3:51
15.	"I'ma Doomee (Love Letter)"	3:04
16.	"Knuckle Sandwich"	2:07
Total length:		57:24

2004 US reissue edition bonus tracks
No.	Title	Length
17.	"What U Sittin' On? (DM's 26 Remix)" (featuring Cee-Lo and Tha Liks)	3:30
18.	"The Shit"	3:18
19.	"Ghetto Pop Life II"	3:54
Total length:		68:09

== Ghetto Pop Mix ==
Ghetto Pop Mix

Mixtape by Danger Mouse and Jemini
- Released: September 25, 2003
- Genre: Hip-hop
- Length: 36:23
- Label: Lex
- Producer: Danger Mouse

There were two editions of this promotional mixtape CD: The original one, with eleven tracks, which was only available with the August 2003 issue of Hip-Hop Connection; and an extended version with a total of sixteen tracks.

No.	Title	Length
1.	"Intro"	2:15
2.	"Ghetto Pop Life"	1:40
3.	"Don't Do Drugs"	1:12
4.	"The Only One"	1:13
5.	"(exclusive track)"	2:44
6.	"That Brooklyn Shit"	2:10
7.	"What U Sittin' On?"	2:00
8.	"Omega Supreme"	3:38
9.	"Bush Boys"	1:35
10.	"(exclusive track)"	1:01
11.	"Copy Cats"	2:24
12.	"(exclusive track)"	1:57
13.	"Brooklyn Kids"	2:56
14.	"Who Wanna Step II Dis"	4:21
15.	"Tom's Diner (DM Mix)"	1:59
16.	"It Ain't Hard to Tell (DM Mix)"	3:13
Total length:		36:23
