= Use Your Confusion =

Studio album by Juggaknots
- Released: October 30, 2006
- Studios: Bronx Bully Studios (Bronx, N.Y.)
- Genre: Hip-hop
- Length: 55:54
- Label: Amalgam
- Producers: B-Money; Breeze Brewin; Buddy Slim; DJ Boo; DJ Eli; Oh No; J-Zone

Juggaknots chronology
The Love Deluxe Movement (2004)	Use Your Confusion (2006)	Baby Pictures (C. 1989-1993) (2015)

Singles from Use Your Confusion
- 1. "New $$$" Released: 2006; 2. "Strip Joint" / "Use Your Confusion" Released: 2006

Use Your Confusion is the second studio album by American hip-hop group the Juggaknots. It was released in October 2006 via Amalgam Entertainment. Produced by Breeze Brewin, Buddy Slim, Oh No, B-Money, DJ Boo, DJ Eli and J-Zone, it features guest appearances from Wordsworth, Big Tone, Castro, Che Logan, Jax, J-Treds, Lil' Sci, Nine, Pop, Rob-O, Sadat X, Slick Rick and Sub-Conscious.

== Critical reception ==
Professional ratings
Review scores
Source	Rating
AllHipHop	3/5 stars
AllMusic	3.5/5 stars
Pitchfork	7.6/10
PopMatters	8/10
RapReviews	7.5/10
Spin	3/5 stars

AllMusic's Marisa Brown wrote, "It certainly shows the Juggaknots' maturity and their abilities as complete artists, and is a welcome return". Nate Patrin of Pitchfork called the album "one of the most immediate and accessible indie rap records of 2006" and "a strong reestablishment of a group too good to be forgotten". A. L. Friedman of PopMatters commented that "the lyrics are worth dissecting and the Juggaknots sound as good as ever".

== Track listing ==
No.	Title	Writer(s)	Producer(s)	Length
1.	"Here Comes..."	Kevin Smith; T. Recitas	Buddy Slim; DJ Boo	1:28
2.	"Hey"	Paul Smith; Peridot Smith	Breeze Brewin	3:00
3.	"Namesake"	Paul Smith; Eli Escobar	DJ Eli	5:32
4.	"Leon Phelps"	Paul Smith	Breeze Brewin	3:29
5.	"Strip Joint"	Paul Smith; Peridot Smith	Breeze Brewin	4:07
6.	"Liar, Liar" (featuring Wordsworth)	Paul Smith; Peridot Smith; K. Smith; Vinson Johnson	Breeze Brewin; Buddy Slim	4:03
7.	"Use Your Confusion"	Paul Smith; Peridot Smith; K. Smith	Buddy Slim	4:22
8.	"Smile" (featuring Castro)	Paul Smith; Peridot Smith; V. Callwood	Breeze Brewin	3:37
9.	"New $$$"	Paul Smith; Peridot Smith; Brian Hughes	B-Money	3:44
10.	"Vows" (featuring Slick Rick)	Paul Smith; Peridot Smith; Richard Walters; Michael Jackson	Oh No	3:38
11.	"Daddy's Little Girl"	Peridot Smith; Jackson	Oh No	4:07
12.	"30 Something" (featuring Sadat X)	Paul Smith; Derrick Murphy	Breeze Brewin	4:13
13.	"Movin' the Chains"	Paul Smith; Peridot Smith	Breeze Brewin	3:29
14.	"Never" (featuring Nine)	Paul Smith; Derrick Keyes	Breeze Brewin	3:32
15.	"Crazy 8's" (featuring J-Treds, Lil' Sci, Pop, B-Slim, Big Tone, Che Logan, Wordsworth, Herawin, Sub-Conscious, Rob-O, Jax, and Breeze Brewin)	Jay Mumford; J. Hill; John Robinson; Vincent Turner; K. Smith; Anthony Jackson; Che Logan; Johnson; Peridot Smith; C. Shelby; Robert Odindo; Christopher Thurston; Paul Smith; J. Buchanan	J-Zone	3:33
Total length:				55:54
