= Seed to Sun =

Studio album by Boom Bip
- Released: September 16, 2002
- Genre: Hip hop
- Length: 61:40
- Label: Lex Records
- Producer: Boom Bip

Boom Bip chronology
Seed to Sun (2002)	Blue Eyed in the Red Room (2005)

Singles from Seed to Sun
- 1. "Mannequin Hand Trapdoor I Reminder" Released: 2002

Seed to Sun is the first solo studio album by Boom Bip. It was released through Lex Records on September 16, 2002. "Mannequin Hand Trapdoor I Reminder" was released as a single from the album.

== Critical reception ==
Professional ratings
Review scores
Source	Rating
AllMusic	4.5/5 stars
BBC	favorable
CMJ New Music Report	favorable
Pitchfork	7.3/10
Stylus Magazine	C

John Bush of AllMusic gave the album 4.5 stars out of 5, saying, "It's experimental hip-hop being done on a level reached by few producers out there." Olli Siebelt of BBC called it "an album that is as experimental and cutting edge as anything in Warp's back catalogue." Sam Chennault of Pitchfork gave the album a 7.3 out of 10, commenting that "Seed to Sun works best when it's either quirkily repetitive or resigning itself to funky experimentation."

== Track listing ==
No.	Title	Length
1.	"Roads Must Roll"	3:58
2.	"Third Stream"	2:56
3.	"Closed Shoulders"	4:50
4.	"The Unthinkable" (featuring Buck65)	4:34
5.	"Newly Weds"	1:00
6.	"U R Here"	5:41
7.	"Pulse All Over"	5:13
8.	"Popsicle" (featuring Nacky Koma)	4:42
9.	"Awaiting an Accident"	5:21
10.	"Mannequin Hand Trapdoor I Reminder" (featuring Dose One)	4:10
11.	"Me: The New You"	1:27
12.	"The Use of Unacceptable Colors in Nature"	5:36
13.	"Last Walk Around Mirror Lake"	12:03
Total length:		61:40

== Personnel ==
Credits adapted from liner notes.

- Boom Bip – music
- Buck65 – lyrics (4), vocals (4)
- Nacky Koma – lyrics (8), vocals (8)
- Dose One – lyrics (10), vocals (10)
- Ashley Shepherd – additional instrumentation (10)
- Ehquestionmark – artwork
