= Across the Multiverse =

Studio album by Dent May
- Released: August 18, 2017
- Length: 42:39
- Label: Carpark

Dent May chronology
Warm Blanket (2013)	Across the Multiverse (2017)

Professional ratings
Aggregate scores
Source	Rating
Metacritic	79/100
Review scores
Source	Rating
AllMusic	4.5/5 stars
Flood Magazine	7/10
PopMatters	8/10

Across the Multiverse is the fourth studio album by American singer-songwriter Dent May. It was released in August 2017 under Carpark Records.

== Track listing ==
No.	Title	Length
1.	"Hello Cruel World"	3:39
2.	"Picture on a Screen"	3:36
3.	"Across the Multiverse"	3:04
4.	"Dream 4 Me"	3:58
5.	"Take Me to Heaven"	4:28
6.	"90210"	3:16
7.	"Face Down in the Gutter of Your Love"	4:12
8.	"A Little Bit Goes a Long Way"	4:17
9.	"Don't Let Them"	4:36
10.	"I'm Gonna Live Forever Until I'm Dead"	3:46
11.	"Distance to the Moon"	3:47
