= Circle (Boom Bip and Doseone album) =

Studio album by Boom Bip & Doseone
- Released: August 1, 2000
- Recorded: August 1 – October 1, 1999
- Genre: Hip hop; poetry reading
- Length: 70:35
- Label: Mush Records
- Producer: Boom Bip; Doseone

Circle is a collaborative studio album by Boom Bip & Doseone. It was originally released via Mush Records on August 1, 2000. In Europe, it was re-released via The Leaf Label on May 27, 2002.

== Critical reception ==
Professional ratings
Review scores
Source	Rating
AllMusic	4.5/5 stars
Exclaim!	favorable
The Milk Factory	5/5 stars

Kingsley Marshall of AllMusic gave the album 4.5 stars out of 5, saying, "Boom's otherworldly production and sense of the epic match the rapid-fire delivery of Dose blow for blow -- though occasionally the lyrics come so quickly that lines have to be spun simultaneously through different speakers." Thomas Quinlan of Exclaim! called it "one of the greatest contemporary hip-hop albums".

The New York Times included it on the year-end "Worthwhile Albums Most People Missed" list.

In 2010, Ali Maloney of The Skinny described the album as "a critical textbook for anyone with delusions of performance poetry." In 2011, Blake Gillespie of Impose said, "Circle remains one of the most daring and challenging records from the early Aughts, predating Anticon's 'advanced hip hop' era."

== Track listing ==
All tracks are written by Boom Bip and Doseone.

No.	Title	Length
1.	"Open"	0:10
2.	"The Birdcatcher"	3:10
3.	"Square"	0:51
4.	"Dead Man's Teal"	2:57
5.	"Re: The Rarity of Meaningful Experience"	1:08
6.	"Directions to California"	1:37
7.	"The Lantern"	3:19
8.	"'Art Saved My Life' - 71"	1:37
9.	"Questions Over Coffee"	3:16
10.	"Wishful Thinking"	2:51
11.	"Ironish"	3:39
12.	"21 to 35"	0:23
13.	"Slight"	3:17
14.	"'Open Quotes"	0:54
15.	"Town Crier's Walk"	4:25
16.	"Fence Hopping"	1:35
17.	"Poetic License"	1:30
18.	"Viewfinder"	1:08
19.	"The Birdcatcher's Return"	4:11
20.	"Sleep Talkin"	2:43
21.	"Gin"	5:03
22.	"Goddamn Telephone"	2:48
23.	"I Get It"	0:13
24.	"Me and People"	3:54
25.	"Ho's"	0:38
26.	"Square... No Corners"	1:37
27.	"This Album Was Meant to Be Myself but Somewhere Along the Line It Ended Up Feeling More Like You... Yet..."	0:36
28.	"The Birdcatcher's Oath"	5:20
29.	"Close"	5:27
Total length:		70:35

== Personnel ==
Credits adapted from liner notes.

- Boom Bip – performance, production
- Doseone – performance, production
- Robert Curcio – additional production
- Tony Franklin – drums (19)
- Anthony (Tony) Luensman – alternative instrumentation (21)
- Mark Fox – puppets
- Hiro Matsuo – photography
