= Craft of the Lost Art =

Studio album by Shape of Broad Minds
- Released: August 26, 2007
- Genre: Hip hop
- Length: 66:09
- Label: Lex Records
- Producer: Jneiro Jarel

Shape of Broad Minds chronology
Blue Experience EP (2007)	Craft of the Lost Art (2007)	Raiders of the Lost Mix (2007)

Singles from Craft of the Lost Art
- 1. "OPR8R" Released: 2008

Professional ratings
Review scores
Source	Rating
AllMusic	4.5/5 stars
Cyclic Defrost	favorable
Metro	4/5 stars
Spin	favorable
XLR8R	favorable

Craft of the Lost Art is the first studio album by Shape of Broad Minds. It was released on Lex Records in 2007.

== Production ==
Shape of Broad Minds was a group made up of Jneiro Jarel, Dr. Who Dat?, Jawwaad, Panama Black, and Rocque Wun. With the exception of Jawwaad, the rest of the group were aliases of Jneiro Jarel. In an interview with Clash, Jarel stated that Craft of the Lost Art came out of a deep depression, saying, "I'd had a bad year and felt really low, like I was drowning, so I built the album around that." He described it as "an album left in a treasure chest underwater." The album featured guest appearances from MF Doom, Count Bass D, John Robinson, Stacy Epps, and Deborah Jordan.

== Critical reception ==
Vincent Thomas of AllMusic gave the album 4.5 stars out of 5, calling it "an exploratory album, with no terrain off limits." Tom Smith of Cyclic Defrost said, "it's forward thinking, soulful, honest, hip hop that has been in high rotation around here for several weeks." Jesse Serwer of XLR8R said, "SOBM flips a spaced-out jazzy aesthetic that at various points recalls Digable Planets, Antipop Consortium, and J Dilla."

Siobhan Murphy of Metro gave the album 4 stars out of 5, saying: "There's variety and invention aplenty, moments of beauty and sly humour, but ultimately the album's 23 tracks add up to a cohesive hip hop offering of genuine significance." Mosi Reeves of Spin said, "[Jneiro Jarel is] better off handing the mic to guest MCs Count Bass D, MF Doom, and Stacy Epps and focusing on his richly textured, next-level beats."

PopMatters placed it at number 90 on the "101 Hip-Hop Albums of 2007" list.

== Track listing ==
No.	Title	Length
1.	"Gorilla Mash"	1:33
2.	"Light Years Away"	2:53
3.	"Let's Go" (featuring MF Doom)	4:24
4.	"Changes"	3:44
5.	"Nahuma (Interlude)"	0:43
6.	"OPR8R"	6:16
7.	"Budda Fly Away"	5:02
8.	"Unnamed"	0:49
9.	"It Lives On" (featuring Count Bass D)	1:19
10.	"So Much (Chaos)" (featuring Lil Sci a.k.a. John Robinson)	4:29
11.	"Buzz Around Town"	1:55
12.	"They Don't Know" (featuring Stacy Epps)	3:04
13.	"Bopper Blocker"	1:16
14.	"Electric Blue"	4:26
15.	"Mermaid (Outro)"	0:55
16.	"It Ain't Dead!"	1:48
17.	"Beast from da East"	1:36
18.	"Lullabanger (Thelonious Dedication)"	3:30
19.	"Viberian Sun"	2:10
20.	"There 4 Me"	3:03
21.	"Stiff Robots and Drunken Horses"	3:26
22.	"Solo (Underwater)" (featuring Deborah Jordan)	3:48
23.	"1 2 C"	4:00
