= Cocaine Sunday =

Single by Eyedress

from the album Sensitive G
- Released: 13 February 2018
- Recorded: 2017
- Genre: Bedroom pop
- Length: 2:48
- Label: Lex
- Songwriter: Idris Vicuña
- Producer: Eyedress

Eyedress singles chronology
"Gwapo Ko Galing Sa'Yo" (2018)	"Cocaine Sunday" (2018)	"Be a Better Friend" (2018)

"Cocaine Sunday" is a song by Filipino musician Eyedress, first released as single from a compilation by Sahara Hardcore Records on 13 February 2018. The single was subsequently included on Eyedress' second studio album Sensitive G which was released on 16 November 2018. In 2024 the track received gold certification from the RIAA for selling 500,000 equivalent units in the United States.

== Background ==
Written and recorded in Manila, during the violent, protracted Philippine drug war, "Cocaine Sunday" lyrics relate Eyedress' drug fueled paranoia and depression. Eyedress told Paper that he wrote the track sober reflecting on his recent past: "I've kind of quit all my vices... Before, I was really reckless, and it was just part of my daily routine — getting fucked up or being high all the time. Now, I can't really do any of that, because I need to be present, and I need to focus on all the things going on around me."

Eyedress talked about his feelings of anxiety relating to the war on drugs that was unfolding around him in Manila during that period to The Telegraph, "There is always the thought in the back of your head that something could happen. A friend of my girlfriend's was caught up with drugs a year ago, and the police broke into her house and killed her. They threw her body on the street. She wasn't even poor. She was from a very nice area. So I don't go out anymore. I'm too paranoid."

== Reception ==
Writing in Q, Jazz Monroe described "Cocaine Sunday" as the "mildew-y sound of self-doubt festering in dark rooms: vocals processed to a wisp and buried beneath swarming guitars and synths that linger like a blue funk."

Neil Kularni described Eyedress' the song in DJ Mag: "Crucially, he has a good ear for a hook, with a real sense of liquid space in his arrangements and playing. With Duterte in power this is a supremely brave record to bring out in the Philippines and Vicuña is to be applauded for his lyrical fearlessness and musical freedom."

== Certifications ==
Region	Certification	Certified units/sales
Canada (Music Canada)	Gold	40,000^{‡}
United States (RIAA)	Gold	500,000^{‡}
^{‡} Sales+streaming figures based on certification alone.
