= Disflex6 =

US musical group

- Also known as: Disflex 6, Disflex.6
- Origin: California, United States
- Genres: Alternative hip hop
- Years active: 1996-present
- Labels: Lex Records, Twenty Four Seven Records, Sunset leagues International
- Members: Jason the Argonaut; Lazerus Jackson
- Website: disflex6.bandcamp.com

Disflex6 is an American hip hop duo formed in 1996, consisting of Lazerus Jackson and Jason the Argonaut. The group was a notable pioneer in the "multiracial world of the San Francisco underground hip hop scene." The group's unique dark, mellow, avant-garde style of hip-hop garnered international appeal in particular, and they built on that through releases on European-based labels.

== History ==
Disflex6 was scheduled to release a space-themed, concept album Robot Dreams but the deal with Lex Records fell through and they were left looking for a new home. The duo released Slow Burn on Twenty Four Seven Records in 2007, and The Loopholes Project on Sunset leagues International in 2008.

== Members ==
- Jason the Argonaut - rapper/producer
- Lazerus Jackson - rapper
- Elon is - producer/engineer

== Discography ==
=== Albums ===
- 1984 (1996)
- Roadside Attractions (1998)
- Where the Sidewalk Ends (2000)
- Robot Dreams (2005)
- Slow Burn (2007)
- The Loophole Project (2008)
- Odyssey (2013)

=== EPs ===
- The Guts EP (2000)

=== Singles ===
- "Natural Selection" (2000)
- "Hot Season" (2001)
- "The Cliffs" (2001)
- "Trunk" (2003)
- "Dream Sequence" b/w "Bomb the Factory" (2005)
- "Winnie Cooper" (2013)

=== Remixes ===
- Collosus - "You a Grown Man Now (Disflex 6 Remix)" from From the Lab (2006)
- Extra Kool - "I Fly" (Elon & Argonaut Remix) (2012)
- GrandKillaCon - "Driftin Drifter" (Argonaut Remix) (2013)
