= Let's Skip to the Wedding =

Studio album by Eyedress
- Released: August 7, 2020
- Genres: Bedroom pop; post-punk; indie pop; rock
- Length: 41:00
- Label: Lex
- Producer: Eyedress

Eyedress chronology
| Sensitive G (2018) | Let's Skip to the Wedding (2020) | Mulholland Drive (2021) |

Singles from Let's Skip To The Wedding
- 1. "I Don't Wanna Be Your Friend" Released: October 22, 2019; 2. "Trauma" Released: November 12, 2019; 3. "Jealous" Released: December 6, 2019; 4. "Romantic Lover" Released: January 12, 2020; 5. "Let's Skip to the Wedding" Released: February 14, 2020; 6. "Can I See You Tonight?" Released: June 11, 2020; 7. "Skateboarding Day" Released: June 21, 2020; 8. "Last Time I'm Falling in Love" Released: July 9, 2020; 9. "Kiss Me Like It's The First Time" Released: August 17, 2020

Let's Skip to the Wedding is the third studio album by Filipino singer-songwriter Eyedress, released on August 7, 2020, through Lex Records. The album was produced by Eyedress.

== Reception ==
Professional ratings
Review scores
| Source | Rating |
|---|---|
| AllMusic | 4/5 stars |
| PopMatters | 7/10 |

The Fader wrote that "the latest album from cult Filipino lo-fi artist and King Krule associate Eyedress is effortlessly cool..." with "...reverbed vocals and jangly guitars" and the "...searing dreampop levels up on his new record Let's Skip To The Wedding, particularly on the lush, head-spinning 'X-Girl.'". DIY highlighted "sunshine-soaked indie number, the self-produced 'Can I See You Tonight?' [which] oozes chilled vibes." PopMatters wrote "Faster cuts like 'Let's Skip to the Wedding', 'Jealous', and non-single standout 'Happy Hour' squeeze all possible sonic elements together in dense melodic ostinati over simple, driving rhythms". AllMusic described the album as "... a strange yet sweet web of homespun styles, sounding like a lost post-punk tape one minute (the goth-tinged "Last Time I'm Falling in Love") and a Prince demo the next (the wild falsetto vocals of "Never Been to Prom")."

Two singles from the album, "Jealous" and "Romantic Lover" became viral hits on TikTok. "Jealous" featured in over one million TikTok videos and appeared in The Fader's Best Songs of 2020 list.

"Jealous" was certified Gold in Australia, Canada, Poland and the USA 2021. In March 2023, the RIAA certified "Jealous" 2× Platinum and "Romantic Lover" Platinum.

== Track listing ==
All tracks are written by Idris Vicuña.

Let's Skip to the Wedding track listing
| No. | Title | Length |
|---|---|---|
| 1. | "Let's Skip to the Wedding" | 1:38 |
| 2. | "Skateboarding Day" | 2:24 |
| 3. | "Never Want to Be Apart" | 1:57 |
| 4. | "Can I See You Tonight?" | 2:37 |
| 5. | "Romantic Lover" | 1:26 |
| 6. | "X-Girl" | 2:13 |
| 7. | "I Don't Want to Be Your Friend" | 1:40 |
| 8. | "Jealous" | 2:02 |
| 9. | "Last Time I'm Falling in Love" | 2:26 |
| 10. | "Pop the Question" | 1:59 |
| 11. | "Happy Hour" | 3:08 |
| 12. | "Trauma" | 2:19 |
| 13. | "My Girl the Finest" | 3:11 |
| 14. | "Never Been to Prom" | 2:16 |
| 15. | "Mystical Creature's Best Friend" | 1:50 |
| 16. | "Pick Up Your Phone" | 1:39 |
| 17. | "Self Improvement" | 1:31 |
| 18. | "Kiss Me Like It's the First Time" | 2:56 |
| 19. | "Anything for You" | 1:29 |
| Total length: | | 41:00 |

== Charts ==
Chart performance for Let's Skip to the Wedding
| Chart (2021) | Peak position |
|---|---|
| Lithuanian Albums (AGATA) | 66 |
| US Billboard Heatseekers | 17 |

== Certifications ==
Certifications for Let's Skip to the Wedding
| Region | Certification | Certified units/sales |
|---|---|---|
| Canada (Music Canada) | Gold | 40,000^{‡} |
| Mexico (AMPROFON) | Gold | 30,000^{‡} |
| Poland (ZPAV) | Gold | 10,000^{‡} |
| United States (RIAA) | Gold | 500,000^{‡} |
^{‡} Sales+streaming figures based on certification alone.
