= Boom Bip =

American record producer (born 1974)

- Born: Bryan Charles Hollon; June 22, 1974 (age 52); Cincinnati, Ohio, U.S.
- Genres: Hip-hop; electronic
- Occupations: Producer; DJ
- Years active: 1998–present
- Labels: Mush; Lex

Bryan Charles Hollon (born June 22, 1974), better known by his stage name Boom Bip, is an American record producer and musician. He is one half of Neon Neon along with Gruff Rhys. He is based in Los Angeles, California.

== Biography ==
Boom Bip started his career as a DJ while attending college in his hometown of Cincinnati, Ohio. In 1998, he released a collaborative EP with DJ Osiris, titled The Low End Sequence EP, on Mush Records. In 2000, he released a collaborative album with Doseone, titled Circle, on Mush Records. Boom Bip's debut solo studio album, Seed to Sun, was released on Lex Records in 2002. It featured guest appearances from Buck 65 and Doseone. In 2004, Boom Bip released a compilation album, Corymb, which included remixes by Boards of Canada, Venetian Snares, Clouddead, Lali Puna, Four Tet, and Mogwai, B-sides, and tracks from his two Peel Sessions.

Having moved to Silver Lake, Los Angeles, Boom Bip released his second solo studio album, Blue Eyed in the Red Room, on Lex Records in 2005. It featured guest appearances from Gruff Rhys and Nina Nastasia. In 2007, he released an EP, Sacchrilege. In 2011, Boom Bip released his third solo studio album, Zig Zaj, on Lex Records. It featured collaborations with Money Mark, Jenny Lee Lindberg, Josh Klinghoffer, Mike Noyce, Cate Le Bon, and Alex Kapranos. In 2013, he released a collaborative EP with Charlie White, titled Music for Sleeping Children.

== Discography ==
=== Studio albums ===
- Seed to Sun (2002)
- Blue Eyed in the Red Room (2005)
- Zig Zaj (2011)

=== Collaborative albums ===
- Circle (2000) (with Doseone)
- Belief (2022) (with Stella Mozgawa)

=== Soundtrack albums ===
- Sun Choke (2016)

=== Compilation albums ===
- Corymb (2004)

=== EPs ===
- The Low End Sequence EP (1998) (with DJ Osiris)
- Doo Doo Breaks Volume 1 (2000)
- Doo Doo Tones Volume 1 (2002)
- From Left to Right (2003)
- Doo Doo Breaks Volume 2 (2003)
- Morning & a Day (2004)
- Sacchrilege (2007)
- Music for Sleeping Children (2013) (with Charlie White)

=== Singles ===
- "Mannequin Hand Trapdoor I Reminder" (2002)
- "28:06:42:12" (2004) (with Daedelus)
- "Do's & Don'ts" (2005) (with Gruff Rhys)

=== Productions ===
- Busdriver - "Kill Your Employer", "Sun Shower", "Kill Floor", and "Dream Catcher's Mitt" from RoadKillOvercoat (2007)

=== Remixes ===
- Smyglyssna - "We Can Fake It (Boom Bip Remix)" from We Can Fix It Remixes (2003)
- Amon Tobin - "Verbal (Boom Bip Remix)" from Verbal Remixes & Collaborations (2003)
- Super Furry Animals - "Father Father (Boom Bip Remix)" from Phantom Phorce (2004)
- Her Space Holiday - "The Luxury of Loneliness (Boom Bip Remix)" from The Young Machines Remixed (2004)
- Lali Puna - "Micronomic (Boom Bip Remix)" from I Thought I Was Over That: Rare, Remixed and B-Sides (2005)
- M83 - "Don't Save Us from the Flames (Boom Bip Remix)" (2005)
- Alias & Tarsier - "Plane That Draws a White Line (Boom Bip Remix)" from Plane That Draws a White Line (2006)
- Four Tet - "No More Mosquitoes (Boom Bip Remix)" from Remixes (2006)
- Editors - "An End Has a Start (Boom Bip Remix)" (2007)
- The Glitch Mob - "I Need My Memory Back (Boom Bip Remix)" from Love Death Immortality Remixes (2015)
