= Re:Release =

Compilation album by Juggaknots
- Released: February 25, 2003
- Genre: Hip-hop
- Length: 60:57
- Label: Third Earth Music, Amalgam Digital, Matic Records
- Producer: The Juggaknots, Breezly Brewin, B-Slim, Chris Liggio, The Obvious Wonder

Juggaknots chronology
Clear Blue Skies (1996)	Re:Release (2003)	The Love Deluxe Movement (2004)

Professional ratings
Review scores
Source	Rating
AllMusic	3/5 stars
Pitchfork	8.2/10
SF Weekly	favorable
Tiny Mix Tapes	5/5 stars

Re:Release is a 2003 compilation album by American hip-hop group Juggaknots. It consists of all tracks from Clear Blue Skies and 11 additional tracks.

== Critical reception ==
Todd Kristel of AllMusic gave the album 3 stars out of 5, saying, "with its thick, low-end heavy beats, some good scratches, and Breezly Brewin's deft flow, this album is generally appealing." Greg Doherty of SF Weekly said, "The production is uncompromisingly grainy and midtempo -- the opposite of slick -- with the lyrics carrying most of the momentum." Matt Kallman of Pitchfork gave the album an 8.2 out of 10, commenting that "The bonus tracks are a nice touch in and of themselves, and have some worth considering the limited output of anything wholly Juggaknots, period."

== Track listing ==
No.	Title	Producer	Length
1.	"The Hunt Is On"	The Juggaknots	0:33
2.	"Trouble Man"	The Juggaknots, Chris Liggio (co.)	4:38
3.	"Jivetalk"	The Juggaknots	5:09
4.	"Watch Ya Head (Remix)"	Breezly Brewin	1:30
5.	"Epiphany"	The Juggaknots, Chris Liggio (co.)	4:05
6.	"The Circle (Pt. II)"	B-Slim	1:12
7.	"The Circle (Pt. I)"	Breezly Brewin, B-Slim	2:43
8.	"Who Makes It Hot" (featuring Adagio)	The Obvious Wonder	4:36
9.	"Romper Room"	The Juggaknots, Chris Liggio (co.)	4:24
10.	"Come Along"	B-Slim	0:54
11.	"Loosifa"	The Juggaknots, Chris Liggio (co.)	5:11
12.	"A Rainy Saturday"	Chris Liggio	1:21
13.	"Sex Type Thang"	The Juggaknots	5:01
14.	"You Gotta Do One of These Songs"	The Juggaknots, Chris Liggio (co.)	3:39
15.	"Projections"	B-Slim	1:11
16.	"I’m Gonna Kill You"	The Juggaknots	4:05
17.	"Luvamaxin"	The Juggaknots	1:46
18.	"Clear Blue Skies (Remix)"	The Juggaknots	4:12
19.	"Up at the Stretch Armstrong WKCR Radio Show" (hosted by Bobbito)		0:52
20.	"Clear Blue Skies"	The Juggaknots, Chris Liggio (co.)	3:55
