= Georgiavania =

Studio album by Willie Isz
- Released: June 15, 2009
- Genre: Hip hop
- Length: 46:24
- Label: Lex
- Producer: Dr. Who Dat?

Khujo chronology
A.T.L. 2 (A-Town Legends 2) (2008)	Georgiavania (2009)	Age Against the Machine (2013)

Jneiro Jarel chronology
Beyond 2morrow (2009)	Georgiavania (2009)	Fauna (2010)

Professional ratings
Aggregate scores
Source	Rating
AnyDecentMusic?	6.9/10
Review scores
Source	Rating
Clash	8/10
Cokemachineglow	61%/100%
HipHopDX	3.5/5
Pitchfork	7.7/10
Spin	6/10 marks

Georgiavania is the only studio album by American hip hop duo Willie Isz. It was released on June 15, 2009, via Lex Records. Production was entirely handled by member Jneiro Jarel (under his beatmaking alias Dr. Who Dat?). It features contributions from Gloria Ryann and Tunde Adebimpe.

At AnyDecentMusic?, which assigns a normalized rating out of 10 to reviews from mainstream publications, the album received an average score of 6.9, based on six reviews.

== Track listing ==
No.	Title	Length
1.	"Willie Intro"	0:24
2.	"Blast Off"	3:13
3.	"Georgiavania"	4:05
4.	"Loner"	4:00
5.	"Gawn Jet" (featuring Tunde Adebimpe)	4:06
6.	"I Didn't Mean To"	4:05
7.	"U Want Some" (featuring Gloria Ryann)	2:46
8.	"Spiritual Gladiators"	3:58
9.	"The Grussle"	3:44
10.	"Violet Heart Box"	5:38
11.	"Autopilot"	4:00
12.	"Shine"	1:34
13.	"In the Red"	4:51
Total length:		46:24

== Personnel ==
- Omar "Jneiro Jarel" Gilyard – rap vocals, backing vocals (tracks: 2, 3, 5–8, 10, 11, 13), synth guitar (tracks: 2, 5, 6, 12, 13), producer, recording, mixing
- Willie Edward "Khujo" Knighton Jr. – rap vocals
- Babatunde Omoroga Adebimpe – vocals (track 5)
- Gloria Ryann – vocals (track 7)
- Jake Morelli – additional guitar (tracks: 2, 5)
- Lamont "Managan" Fountain – additional guitar (track 6), recording, mixing (tracks: 1–11, 13)
- David "DJ Kiva" Luz – additional guitar (track 13)
- Ray Murray – recording (tracks: 2–4, 7–11)
- James Jarvis – artwork
