= JJ Doom =

American hip-hop duo

- Origin: United States
- Genres: Alternative hip-hop
- Years active: 2011–2014
- Label: Lex Records
- Members: Jneiro Jarel; MF Doom
- Website: lexrecords.com

JJ Doom (stylized in all caps) was an American alternative hip-hop duo composed of Jneiro Jarel and MF Doom.

== History ==
On February 15, 2012, the website Pitchfork ran an article stating that JJ DOOM's debut album would be called Key to the Kuffs and released via Lex Records. On July 5, 2012, Lex Records announced that the album was set for a worldwide release on August 21, 2012, and would feature appearances from Beth Gibbons, Khujo Goodie, Boston Fielder, and Damon Albarn.

As of August 29, 2012, Key to the Kuffs sold 3,300 copies after debuting at number 148 on the Billboard 200.

== Discography ==
| Year | Album | Chart positions | |
| Year | Album | USA | USA Heatseekers |
|---|---|---|---|
| 2012 | Key to the Kuffs: Released: August 20, 2012; Record Label: Lex Records | 148 | 3 |
| 2014 | Bookhead EP: Released: February 24, 2014; Record Label: Lex Records | - | - |
