= Jemini the Gifted One =

American rapper

- Also known as: Jemini
- Born: Thomas Smith
- Origin: Brooklyn, New York
- Died: March 27, 2025
- Genres: Alternative hip hop
- Occupation: Rapper
- Years active: 1995–2025
- Labels: Mercury/PolyGram Records, Tommy Boy Black Label, Big Token Records, Brainchild Entertainment, Lex Records

Thomas Smith, better known by his stage name Jemini the Gifted One, was an American rapper from Brooklyn, New York. He most notably worked with Danger Mouse on the 2003 album Ghetto Pop Life, which features rappers such as The Pharcyde, Tha Alkaholiks, J-Zone, and Prince Po from Organized Konfusion.

== Career ==
Jemini released a 7 track promo-only EP only Mercury/Polygram in 1995 called Scars and Pain.

"Funk Soul Sensation", produced by Organized Konfusion, was the debut single. In a review, Billboard called it "[s]ensational, smart soul." It peaked at number 36 on Billboard's Hot Rap Songs chart. A remix of "Funk Soul Sensation" was released later in 1995 on 12" vinyl. The B-side was "Funk Soul Sensation pt.II", which continued the dual personas of "The Gifted One" and the "Funk Soul Sensation" rapping back and forth to each other. In 1997, Jemini released another promotional single titled "Who Wanna Step To Dis" which was followed by 1998's "I.M.C.U.D.O.N.T./Who Wanna Step II Dis."

His 2003 collaboration with Danger Mouse, Ghetto Pop Life, landed the duo on The Guardian's list of The Forty Best Bands in the US, stating that the album "opts for a charming musical eclecticism and a fierce lyrical intelligence that bears comparison to prime-time Public Enemy." The Independent wrote, "Along with Outkast's double-header, Speakerboxxx/The Love Below, Ghetto Pop Life is this year's most engrossing hip-hop record."

In 2006, another rapper by the name of Gemini, under Lupe Fiasco's 1st & 15th label, emerged in the rap game. Jemini threatened to sue him so Gemini was forced to change his name to GemStones.

In July 2014, a report from BoomBapBox.com revealed Jemini changed his name to "Big City" and was shopping a documentary about Ghetto Pop Life entitled Mice & Men, as well as working on new music and other projects.

== Death ==
Jemini the Gifted One died on March 27, 2025 following health complications stemming from diabetes.

== Discography ==
=== Albums ===
- Ghetto Pop Life (2003) (with Danger Mouse)
- Born Again (with Danger Mouse) (officially recorded in 2004)

=== EPs ===
- Scars and Pain (1995)
- Take Care of Business (2002) (with Danger Mouse)
- Conceited Bastard (2003) (with Danger Mouse)
- 26 Inch EP (2003) (with Danger Mouse)
- Vile Groove Track Pack (2023)

=== Singles ===
- "Funk Soul Sensation" (1995)
- "Who Wanna Step II Dis" (1997)
- "Who Wanna Step II Dis (Remix)" b/w "I.M.C.U.D.O.N.T. (I MC U Don't)" (1998)
- "The I.N.I." b/w "Makes the World Go Round" (2000)
- "Sunshine" (2022)
- "Brooklyn Basquiat" (2023) (with Danger Mouse)

=== Guest appearances ===
- 2 Rude - "All You Need (I Can Love You Better)" and "Don`t Hate Me" from Rudimental 2K (1999)
- Chase Phoenix - "Feel So..." from Cut to the Chase (2004)
- Prince Po - "Hold Dat" and "Fall Back" from The Slickness (2004)
