= Romantic Lover =

Single by Eyedress

from the album Let's Skip to the Wedding
- Released: 12 January 2020
- Recorded: 2019
- Studio: Eyedress's bedroom
- Genre: Indie pop
- Length: 1:26
- Label: Lex
- Songwriter: Idris Vicuña
- Producer: Eyedress

Eyedress singles chronology
"Jealous" (2019)	"Romantic Lover" (2020)	"Let's Skip to the Wedding" (2020)

"Romantic Lover" is a song by Filipino musician Eyedress, first released as a self-directed music video on YouTube 12 January 2020. On 10 July that year it was announced that the song would be released on his next album, Let's Skip to the Wedding (2020). It was the fourth of nine album tracks to be released as singles from Let's Skip to the Wedding.

== Reception ==
Reviewing the album Let's Skip to the Wedding, PopMatters described "Romantic Lover" as "near-monotone vocals over sharp, looping synths". AllMusic highlighted "themes of love, devotion, and tenderness" in the lyrics.

"Romantic Lover" went viral in the USA with Rolling Stone citing the track as one of the fastest-rising songs on American streaming services for the week ending 6 May 2021. It was the second Eyedress single to become a viral hit in 2021 with "Jealous" going viral on TikTok in early 2021. The track was certified platinum by the RIAA on 14 March 2023.

== Charts ==
Chart (2021)	Peak position
Lithuania (AGATA)	100
US Hot Rock & Alternative Songs (Billboard)	44

== Certifications ==
Region	Certification	Certified units/sales
Australia (ARIA)	Gold	35,000^{‡}
Canada (Music Canada)	Platinum	80,000^{‡}
Mexico (AMPROFON)	2× Platinum	120,000^{‡}
New Zealand (RMNZ)	Gold	15,000^{‡}
Poland (ZPAV)	Gold	25,000^{‡}
Switzerland (IFPI Switzerland)	Gold	10,000^{‡}
United Kingdom (BPI)	Silver	200,000^{‡}
United States (RIAA)	2× Platinum	2,000,000^{‡}
^{‡} Sales+streaming figures based on certification alone.
