= Prince Po =

American rapper

- Also known as: Prince-Po; Prince Poetry
- Born: Lawrence Baskerville; August 12, 1969 (age 57); Queens, New York City, U.S.
- Genre: Hip-hop
- Occupations: Rapper; record producer
- Years active: 1987–present
- Labels: Lex; Ice Bearz Movement

Lawrence Baskerville (born August 12, 1969), better known by his stage name Prince Po, is an American rapper and record producer from Queens, New York City, New York. He is a founder of Ice Bearz Movement.

== Early life ==
Prince Po was born Lawrence Baskerville in 1969. He is originally from Queens, New York City, New York.

== Career ==
Prince Po has formed Organized Konfusion with Pharoahe Monch. In the 1990s, the duo released three studio albums: Organized Konfusion (1991), Stress: The Extinction Agenda (1994), and The Equinox (1997). In 2004, he released his debut solo studio album, The Slickness, on Lex Records. The follow-up solo studio album, Prettyblack, was released in 2006. In 2007, he released a collaborative album with TomC3, titled Saga of the Simian Samurai. In 2014, he released a collaborative album with Oh No, titled Animal Serum.

== Discography ==
=== Studio albums ===
- The Slickness (2004)
- Prettyblack (2006)
- Saga of the Simian Samurai (2007) (with TomC3)
- Animal Serum (2014) (with Oh No)

=== EPs ===
- X Files (2009)

=== Singles ===
- "Where Ya Shoes At?" / "Shine" (1998)
- "Hold Dat" (2004)
- "Bump Bump" (2004)
- "Holla" / "Mecheti Lightspeed" (2006)
- "I Got a Right to Know" (2006)

=== Guest appearances ===
- O.C. - "No Main Topic" from Word...Life (1994)
- O.C. - "War Games" from Jewelz (1997)
- DJ Spooky - "Rekonstruction" from Riddim Warfare (1998)
- Pharoahe Monch - "God Send" from Internal Affairs (1999)
- Cella Dwellas - "Ill Collabo" from The Last Shall Be First (2000)
- El Da Sensei - "Frontline" from Relax Relate Release (2002)
- The Planets - "Trees" and "Trees (Remix)" from The Epic (2003)
- Danger Mouse & Jemini the Gifted One - "Copy Cats" from Ghetto Pop Life (2003)
- R.A. the Rugged Man - "Tha Hardway" from American Lowlife (2004)
- Mars Ill - "Glam Rap" from Pro*Pain (2006)
- Kool Keith & TomC3 - "Mechanical Mechanix" from Project Polaroid (2006)
- Casbah 73 - "Welcome to the Casbah" from Pushin' 40 (2007)
- Unified School District - "Know Time Left" from Brokedown Palace (2007)
- Wildchild - "Puppetmasters" from Jack of All Trades (2007)
- Percee P - "Last of the Greats" from Perseverance (2007)
- Paulie Rhyme - "Dusk till Dawn" (2008)
- Oddisee - "Get Up" from Mental Liberation (2009)
- Apollo Brown - "Ghetto Soul Music" from The Reset (2010)
- No Pretense - "Elevation" from Music & Mouthwords (2010)
- KVBeats - "She Gave Me the World" from The Resume (2010)
- 2Mex - "What You Know About" from My Fanbase Will Destroy You (2010)
- Blee - "Posses" from Cosmos Road (2010)
- Sonnyjim - "You Aint Ready" from The Psychonaut (2011)
- DJ Doom - "Classic Hip-Hop" from Temple of Doom (2011)
- Beneficence - "With My Real People" from Sidewalk Science (2011)
- Quakers - "Rock My Soul" from Quakers (2012)
- Gensu Dean - "Heavy" from Lo-Fi Fingahz (2012)
- Kid Tsu - "Get It" from The Chase (2013)
- Hex One & 5th Element - "Speeding (also featuring Awon)" from Hologramz (2014)
- First Division - "The C.D.C. (Cypher for Disease Control)" from Overworked & Underpaid (2015)
- Arakari - "I Do" (also featuring Zilla, Chief Kamachi, KD The Stranger, SirTac, and Omen) from Spawn (2017)
- The Mighty Rhino - "Resplendent" from We Will No Longer Retreat into Darkness (2018)
- The Mighty Rhino - "Fuckouttahere" from A Joy Which Nothing Can Erase (2019)
- DJ Cosm - "Rules" (also featuring El Da Sensei and Sadat X) (2020)
