= Juggaknots =

American hip-hop group

- Also known as: The Juggaknots
- Origin: Bronx, New York, U.S.
- Genres: Underground hip-hop; progressive rap
- Years active: 1995–present
- Labels: Amalgam; Fondle 'Em; Matic
- Members: Breeze Brewin; Queen Herawin; Buddy Slim

Juggaknots is an American hip-hop group from New York City. It consists of siblings Breeze Brewin (Paul Smith), Queen Herawin (Peridot Smith), and Buddy Slim (Kevin Smith). The group has collaborated with Mr. Len, Sadat X, and Prince Paul.

== History ==
Juggaknot's debut studio album, Clear Blue Skies, was released on the vinyl-only New York independent Fondle 'Em Records in 1996. It is considered an underground classic by critics such as Exclaim! and HipHopDX. It was re-released as Re:Release with 11 bonus tracks in 2003.

In 2006, the group released a studio album, Use Your Confusion, which features guest appearances by Sadat X, Wordsworth, and Slick Rick, among others. It was released through Amalgam Digital after a deal was signed with the independent label.

In 2015, the group released a collection of previously unreleased tracks, titled Baby Pictures (C. 1989-1993).

== Discography ==
=== Studio albums ===
- The Juggaknots (1996)
- Use Your Confusion (2006)

=== Compilation albums ===
- Re:Release (2003)
- The Love Deluxe Movement (2004)

=== EPs ===
- Baby Pictures (C. 1989-1993) (2015)

=== Singles ===
- "WKRP in NYC" / "Generally" / "J-Solo" (2001)
- "She Loves Me Not" / "P. Rushen" (2003)
- "Strip Joint" / "Use Your Confusion" (2006)
- "New $$$" (2006)

=== Guest appearances ===
- Wisdom - "All Star Jam" (1996)
- Mr. Len - "This Morning" from Pity the Fool (2001)
