= Eyedress =

Filipino musician

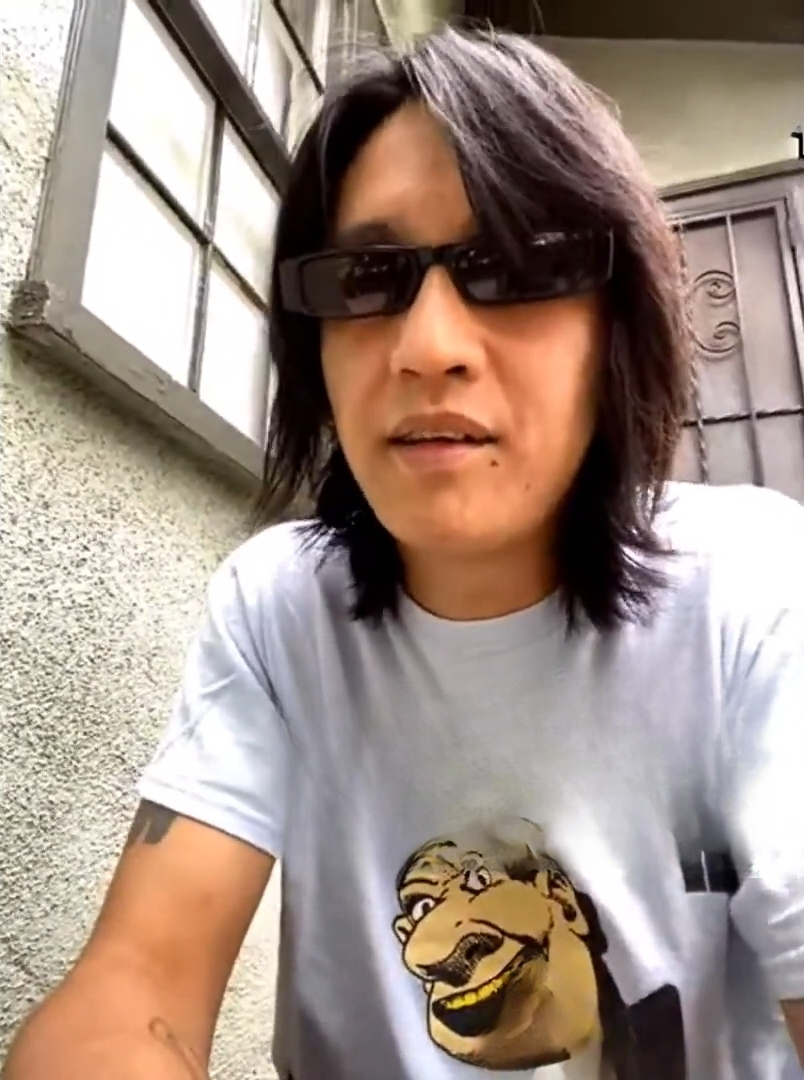
- Eyedress in 2021

Background information
- Born: Idris Ennolandy Vicuña; May 28, 1990 (age 36)
- Origin: Manila, Philippines
- Genres: Bedroom pop; post-punk; indie pop; witch house; hip hop
- Occupations: Musician; songwriter; producer
- Instruments: Guitar; bass; synthesizers; drums
- Years active: 2008–present
- Labels: Lex; XL; Abeano; Babe Slayer; Headcount; Number Line; Offshore Music; Manimal Vinyl
- Website: eyedress.store

Idris Ennolandy Vicuña (born May 28, 1990), known professionally as Eyedress, is a Filipino musician who has released albums in various rock, pop and electronic styles. Hailing from Manila, he currently lives in Los Angeles.

== Early life ==
Eyedress was raised in an area in the Philippines which he described as "ghetto", and began playing the guitar at a young age. He and his family moved to Phoenix, Arizona, where he was introduced to punk music through the "gangsters" and "anarchist types" in his neighborhood. At age 13, he and his family moved to California after his father, an animator, started working with 20th Century Fox. While living in Orange County, California, he joined the crust punk band Liberal Underground as a bassist. He moved back to the Philippines at age 15 with his family. Before starting his career as a musician, he designed clothing for a brief period of time and, at age 20, he started composing music by making beats on his laptop and releasing them for free online.

== Life and career ==
=== 2013–2018: Early career in Manila ===
After gaining a small following from making beats, Eyedress was introduced to Filipino singer Skint Eastwood through a promoter from Manila, and the two collaborated on the song "Biolumine". The song earned him attention from a French label which pushed for him to make an album, which then earned him a record deal with Abeano Records, a subsidiary of XL Recordings. On December 2, 2013, he released his debut extended play Supernatural, which he recorded in his bedroom using FL Studio.

Eyedress released his debut mixtape, Hearing Colors, as a free digital download on April 11, 2014. He released his second EP, Egyptian Night Club to SoundCloud on July 27, 2014. In September 2014, he released the single "Polo Tee" as a tribute to American record producer DJ Rashad. He released his first mixtape after leaving XL Recordings, Shapeshifter, in 2015.

He signed to Lex Records in 2016: releasing his debut studio album Manila Ice the following May. That was followed by Sensitive G in November 2018.

=== 2019–2023: Los Angeles, "Jealous" and breakthrough success ===
Eyedress relocated to Los Angeles from Manila and began recording new songs at his home in Silver Lake.

In late 2019 and early 2020, the first singles from Eyedress' third studio album Let's Skip to the Wedding were released. These included "Jealous" and "Romantic Lover" which became viral hits on TikTok. "Jealous" was certified gold in Australia, Canada, Poland and the US in 2021, and platinum in the US in March 2022. "Romantic Lover" was certified gold in the US in April 2022. The album itself was delayed due to the COVID-19 pandemic and Let's Skip to the Wedding was finally released on August 7, 2020.

His next album, Mulholland Drive, was released on August 27, 2021. In September 2021, shortly after the album release, the first single from Mulholland Drive, "Something About You" went viral in the US with Rolling Stone citing the track as the fastest-rising song on American streaming services for the week ending September 23. In January 2022, Eyedress was ranked at number 35 on the Billboard Emerging Artists chart. "Something About You" was certified gold in the US in May 2022. The album was nominated for Libera Award for Marketing Genius.

Eyedress teamed up with Filipino American artist named Zzzahara and announced their debut album together as The Simps. The album, Siblings, was released by Lex Records on February 14, 2022. The tracklist includes "Tesla", the album's first track as well as the songs "Miss Fortunate" from 2019 and "On Fye" from 2020. The two related over their Filipino background and shared taste in music. Zzzahara soon started playing guitar in the group thereafter.

In April 2022, Eyedress played at Coachella played new material from his forthcoming album his fifth studio album, Full Time Lover, with his band. The album was released on August 26, 2022, its track list consisting of 28 tracks of hip-hop, post-punk and shoegaze. Shortly after the album, Eyedress released a cover of Blur's "Song 2" and he featured on Nosaj Thing track "Different Life" from the album Continua.

On October 5, 2022, an Eyedress remix of Fly Anakin, Pink Siifu, and Fousheé's track "L's" was released. The next day, Eyedress performed live at Elsewhere in Brooklyn headlining a Lex Records event which also included performances by Pink Siifu and Fly Anakin.

A remix of Full Time Lover track "House of Cards" by Kevin Shields was released as part of the Lex-XX remix series on January 23, 2023. RCA Records released "Flowers & Chocolate", his first single for a major label with a music video directed by Eddie Huang on February 13. In March, the RIAA upgraded certification for "Jealous" to 2× Platinum and "Romantic Lover" to Platinum. He collaborates with other notable artists such as Mac DeMarco

=== 2024–present ===
Eyedress released a 21-track album "Stoner" in early 2025, featuring collaborations with artists like Mac DeMarco and The Marías. He performed in the 2025 Coachella Valley Music and Arts Festival. This return performance marks the first return performance to Coachella by an act/project that started performing in the Philippines. Eyedress followed this with the 2025 "Stoner U.S. Tour" with N8NOFACE, that began July 8 in San Francisco and ended August 7 in Los Angeles.

== Discography ==
Studio albums

- Manila Ice (2017)
- Sensitive G (2018)
- Let's Skip to the Wedding (2020)
- Mulholland Drive (2021)
- Full Time Lover (2022)
- Vampire in Beverly Hills (2024)
- Stoner (2025)
