= Dent May =

American singer-songwriter (born 1985)

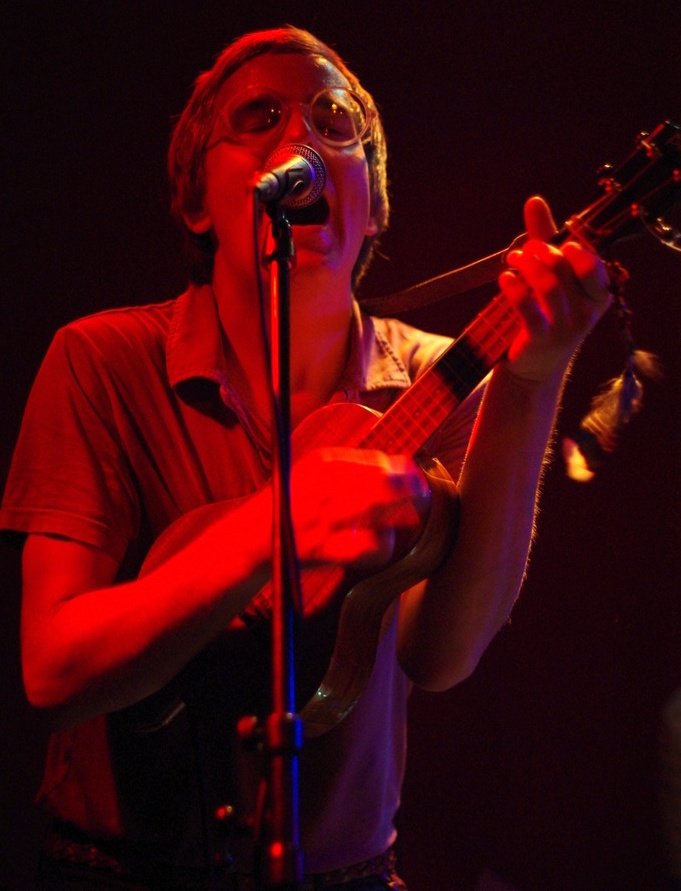
- May in 2009

Background information
- Born: James Dent May Jr. May 6, 1985 (age 41); Jackson, Mississippi, United States
- Genres: Psychedelic pop, synthpop, indie rock, new wave
- Occupations: Musician, songwriter, producer
- Instruments: Guitar, piano, sampler, synthesizer, ukulele, electric guitar
- Years active: 2007–present
- Labels: Paw Tracks, Forest Family, Cats Purring, Carpark Records
- Website: Dentmay.com

James Dent May Jr. (born May 6, 1985) known by his stage name Dent May, is an American singer-songwriter based in Los Angeles, California, United States. He is mostly associated with psychedelic pop, synthpop, indie rock, and new wave genres of music.

== Biography ==
May was born in Jackson, Mississippi. He attended Jackson Prep, NYU Film School and Ole Miss, where he studied English and Southern Studies and found inspiration in the music of Serge Gainsbourg and Lee Hazlewood. May was also a member of a Mississippi power pop group called The Rockwells.

He is signed to the Paw Tracks label, which has released The Good Feeling Music of Dent May & His Magnificent Ukulele (2009), Do Things (2012) and Warm Blanket (2013). May was chosen by Animal Collective to perform at the All Tomorrow's Parties Festival 2011. May co-founded the self-described "North Mississippi Infotainment Cult" known as Cats Purring, which operates out of the Cats Purring Dude Ranch in Oxford, Mississippi.

== Discography ==
=== Albums ===
- 2007: A Brush With Velvet (Self-released demo album)
- 2009: The Good Feeling Music of Dent May & His Magnificent Ukulele (Paw Tracks)
- 2012: Do Things (Paw Tracks)
- 2013: Warm Blanket (Paw Tracks)
- 2017: Across the Multiverse (Carpark Records)
- 2020: Late Checkout (Carpark Records)
- 2024: What's for Breakfast? (Carpark Records)
- 2026: The Big One (Carpark Records)

=== Singles ===
- 2007: "Meet Me in the Garden" (7", Make Mine)
- 2010: "That Feeling" (7", Forest Family Records)
- 2011: "Fun" (7", Paw Tracks)
- 2013: "Born Too Late" (Paw Tracks)
- 2014: "I'll Be Stoned for Christmas"
- 2016: "Face Down in the Gutter of Your Love"
- 2017: "Picture on a Screen"
- 2017: "90210"
- 2017: "Across the Multiverse" (feat. Frankie Cosmos)
- 2019: "Why I Came to California"
- 2022: "Crying Laughing"
- 2026: “The Big One”
