= Jealous (Eyedress song) =

2019 single by Eyedress

- Original digital artwork

Single by Eyedress

from the album Let's Skip to the Wedding
- B-side: "Jealous (instrumental)"
- Released: 6 December 2019
- Recorded: 2019
- Studio: Eyedress's bedroom, Silver Lake, Los Angeles
- Genre: Post-punk; bedroom pop
- Length: 2:02
- Label: Lex
- Songwriter: Idris Vicuña
- Producer: Eyedress

Eyedress singles chronology
"Trauma" (2019)	"Jealous" (2019)	"Romantic Lover" (2020)

Alternative cover
- Artwork for the vinyl release, credited to Eyedress. A newer digital cover was made using the vinyl artwork, replacing the original on streaming services.

Music video
- "Jealous" on YouTube

"Jealous" is a song by Filipino musician Eyedress, released on 6 December 2019 as a single from his album Let's Skip to the Wedding (2020). It first charted at number twenty four on the Billboard Hot Rock & Alternative Songs and number twenty three on the Billboard Hot Alternative Songs charts on the week of 20 February 2021, climbing to number fifteen on both charts the following week, and remaining in the Hot Rock & Alternative Songs chart for 20 weeks. on 4 February 2026 received multi-platinum certification from the RIAA for selling 4,000,000 equivalent units in the United States. By 23 January 2025 "Jealous" had been streamed over 1 billion times on Spotify.

== Background ==
The song was written by Eyedress after he relocated to America from the Philippines. He recorded the song in his bedroom in Silver Lake, Los Angeles with a Teisco guitar.

== Reception ==
PopMatters wrote that, on "Jealous", Eyedress "squeeze[s] all possible sonic elements together in dense melodic ostinati over simple, driving rhythms". "Jealous" appeared in The Fader's Best Songs of 2020 list. "Jealous" became a viral hit in 2020, with the track featuring in over one million TikTok videos. In December 2021, TikTok reported that “Jealous” was the tenth most popular Rock/Alternative track on the platform in the USA that year.

== Remix ==
Lex Records released a remix of "Jealous" by King Krule on March 11, 2021. NME described the remix as "dark" and "hypnotic" and quoted King Krule saying the remix was "Recorded in sweat, last summer, for a friend."

== Music videos ==
The music video for "Jealous", was directed by BRVINFREEZE and features Eyedress skateboarding with Kane The Menace in the Venice Beach.

On March 11, 2020, an animated video for the King Krule Remix directed by Eyedress was released. Alternative Press described the video as "surreal" with "a retro video game vibe" where the musicians "set off on a ’90s Nintendo-style skateboard race through a bizarre Minecraft universe."

== Charts ==
=== Weekly charts ===
Chart (2021)	Peak position
Lithuania (AGATA)	61
UK Indie Breakers Chart (OCC)	7
UK Indie Singles Chart (OCC)	49
US Hot Rock & Alternative Songs (Billboard)	15

=== Year-end charts ===
Chart (2021)	Position
US Hot Rock & Alternative Songs (Billboard)	57

Chart (2022)	Position
Lithuania (AGATA)	80

== Certifications ==
Region	Certification	Certified units/sales
Australia (ARIA)	2× Platinum	140,000^{‡}
Austria (IFPI Austria)	Gold	15,000^{‡}
Canada (Music Canada)	3× Platinum	240,000^{‡}
Mexico (AMPROFON)	4× Platinum	240,000^{‡}
New Zealand (RMNZ)	Platinum	30,000^{‡}
Norway (IFPI Norway)	Platinum	60,000^{‡}
Poland (ZPAV)	Platinum	50,000^{‡}
Switzerland (IFPI Switzerland)	Platinum	20,000^{‡}
United Kingdom (BPI)	Platinum	600,000^{‡}
United States (RIAA)	4× Platinum	4,000,000^{‡}
Streaming
Sweden (GLF)	Gold	4,000,000^{†}
^{‡} Sales+streaming figures based on certification alone.^{†} Streaming-only figures based on certification alone.
