= Lex Records =

British record label

- Founded: 2001
- Founder: Tom Brown
- Genre: Alternative hip-hop, electronic, alternative rock
- Country of origin: England
- Location: Camden, London
- Official website: lexrecords.com

Lex Records is a British independent record label. Most releases on the label are alternative hip-hop, alternative rock or electronic music. Dazed described Lex as a label "...whose wildly creative output spans over a decade of landmark releases that have changed the music industry no end."

== History ==
=== 2000s ===
Founded in 2001, Lex was originally an imprint of Warp. By the end of 2003, Lex had released several albums including debuts by Boom Bip, Non-Prophets and Danger Mouse and the success of these albums allowed Lex to expand.

In 2004, Lex managed The Grey Album campaign, establishing Danger Mouse as a critically successful artist. Damon Albarn got a copy of The Grey Album and this led to Danger Mouse being approached to produce Gorillaz's second album Demon Days. Demon Days was released by Parlophone in May 2005 and sold millions of copies establishing Danger Mouse as a commercially successful producer by the summer of 2005.

In September 2005, Brown bought Warp's share of the label. The next release was Danger Doom The Mouse and the Mask. It was Lex's best selling release to date. Gnarls Barkley's multi platinum debut St. Elsewhere followed in 2006, released on Warner with Lex branding.

In March 2008, Gnarls Barkley's second album 2006 The Odd Couple was released on Warner with Lex branding. In the same month, Lex released Neon Neon Stainless Style which was nominated for the Mercury Prize in 2008.

In 2009, Lex released MF Doom's Born Like This.

=== 2010s ===
In July 2010, Lex released an audiobook of Alan Moore & Mitch Jenkins' Unearthing, narrated by Moore and scored by Crook & Flail. They performed it live at the Old Vic Tunnels. Also in July, Danger Mouse, Sparklehorse & David Lynch's Dark Night of the Soul was released on Parlophone with Lex branding.

In May 2011, Danger Mouse & Daniele Luppi's album Rome featuring Jack White and Norah Jones was released on Parlophone with Lex branding.

On 5 November 2011, Lex marked its tenth anniversary with a show at The Roundhouse in Camden featuring performances by Ghostface Killah, MF Doom and Jneiro Jarel, and released Complex, a compilation album.

In August 2012 Lex released JJ Doom's Key to the Kuffs. Later in 2012 Lex launched Charlie White and Boom Bip's art project Music For Sleeping Children which includes photography, video, electronic music and spoken word recordings. Lex's first two short films, written by Alan Moore and directed by Mitch Jenkins were previewed online in November 2012.

In 2013, Lex released Neon Neon's second album Praxis Makes Perfect. The album was presented live as an immersive theatre performance with National Theatre Wales.

In November 2013, Lex and ATP co-promoted a show with MF Doom, BadBadNotGood and Bishop Nehru at the Kentish Town Forum. MF Doom went on to collaborate with BadBadNotGood and Bishop Nehru on Lex. BadBadNotGood remixed the JJ Doom track "Guv'nor"; MF Doom produced the Bishop Nehru mini-album NehruvianDoom; and MF Doom appeared on BadBadNotGood & Ghostface Killah's album Sour Soul.

Eyedress released his first single on Lex in 2016. His debut studio album, Manila Ice, was released on Lex in May 2017, followed by Sensitive G in November 2018. The single "Cocaine Sunday" from Sensitive G received gold RIAA certification in 2024.

In late 2019, Lex released the first singles from Eyedress’ third album Let's Skip to the Wedding, including "Jealous" on 19 December 2019. “Jealous” became viral hit the following year. “Jealous” was certified gold in Australia, Canada, Poland and the US in 2021, and 3× platinum in the US in March 2024.

=== 2020s ===
Lex released “Romantic Lover” by Eyedress on 12 January 2020 which also became a viral hit."Romantic Lover" was certified platinum in the US in March 2023.

Lex's first feature film, The Show, written by Alan Moore and directed by Mitch Jenkins was an official selection for SXSW 2020. Following SXSW's cancellation due to the COVID-19 pandemic film had a world premiere at Sitges Film Festival 2020, and was licensed to Starz.

Eyedress' album Let's Skip to the Wedding, which includes the singles "Jealous" and "Romantic Lover", was released on 7 August 2020. The album was certified gold in the US and Canada in 2024.

On 31 December 2020, MF Doom's death was announced on social media.

In August 2021 Lex released Eyedress’ fourth studio album Mulholland Drive. The first single from the album, “Something About You” became a viral hit in the US with Rolling Stone citing the track as the fastest-rising song on American streaming services for the week ending 23 September 2021. "Something About You" was certified gold in the US in May 2022, and platinum in October 2023.

During 2021, Lex marked its twentieth anniversary by releasing a series of remixes of recordings in its catalogue under the project title Lex-XX.

== Artists past and present ==
- $ilkmoney
- Alan Moore & Mitch Jenkins
- Andrew Hung
- Andrew Broder
- B. Cool-Aid
- BadBadNotGood & Ghostface Killah
- Belief
- Boom Bip
- Charlie White
- Chuck Strangers
- Dan le Sac Vs Scroobius Pip
- Danger Doom
- Danger Mouse
- Daniele Luppi
- Jemini
- Sparklehorse
- Disflex6
- Dr Who Dat?
- Eyedress
- Fly Anakin
- Pink Siifu
- Fog
- Gnarls Barkley
- Golden Rules
- Haleek Maul
- Heartbreak
- Hymie's Basement
- JJ Doom
- Liv.e & Karriem Riggins
- Lord Jah-Monte Ogbon
- Kae Tempest
- Kaleida
- Kid Acne
- MIKE
- Matty
- MF Doom
- Neon Neon
- Nevermen
- Non-Prophets
- Prefuse 73
- Prince Po
- Shape of Broad Minds
- Subtle
- Tes
- Willie Isz

== Awards ==
Grammy Awards (USA)

- 2011, Danger Mouse Dark Night of the Soul - Producer of the Year, Non-Classical
- 2007, Gnarls Barkley St. Elsewhere - Best Alternative Music Album
- 2007, Gnarls Barkley "Crazy" - Best Urban/Alternative Performance

Plug Independent Music Awards (USA)

- 2006, Danger Doom The Mouse And The Mask - Hip-Hop Album of the Year

British Animation Awards (UK)

- 2006, Director SSSR, Subtle "Swan Meat" video - Best Music Video

== Certifications ==
RIAA certification (USA)

- Eyedress "Jealous" - 4× Platinum digital single
- Eyedress"Something About You" - 2× Platinum digital single
- Eyedress "Cocaine Sunday" - Gold digital single
- Eyedress Let's Skip to the Wedding - Gold album
- Eyedress "Romantic Lover" - 2× Platinum digital single
- Gnarls Barkley St. Elsewhere - 2× Platinum album
- Gnarls Barkley "Crazy" - 8× Platinum digital single
- Gnarls Barkley "Crazy" - Platinum mastertone

Music Canada certification (Canada)

- MF Doom "That's That" - Gold single
- Eyedress "Jealous" - 3× Platinum single
- Kaleida "Think" - Gold single
- Eyedress Let's Skip to the Wedding - Gold album
- Eyedress "Romantic Lover" - Platinum single
- Eyedress "Something About You" - 2× Platinum single
- Gnarls Barkley St. Elsewhere - Platinum album
- Gnarls Barkley "Crazy" - Double Platinum ringtone

Brit Certified (UK)

- Eyedress "Jealous" - Platinum single
- Eyedress "Romantic Lover" - Silver single
- Eyedress "Something About You" - Silver single
- Neon Neon Stainless Style - Bronze / Breakthrough album
- Gnarls Barkley St. Elsewhere - 2× Platinum album
- Gnarls Barkley "Crazy" - 4× Platinum single

== See also ==
- List of record labels
- List of electronic music record labels
- List of independent UK record labels
