= Warpaint discography =

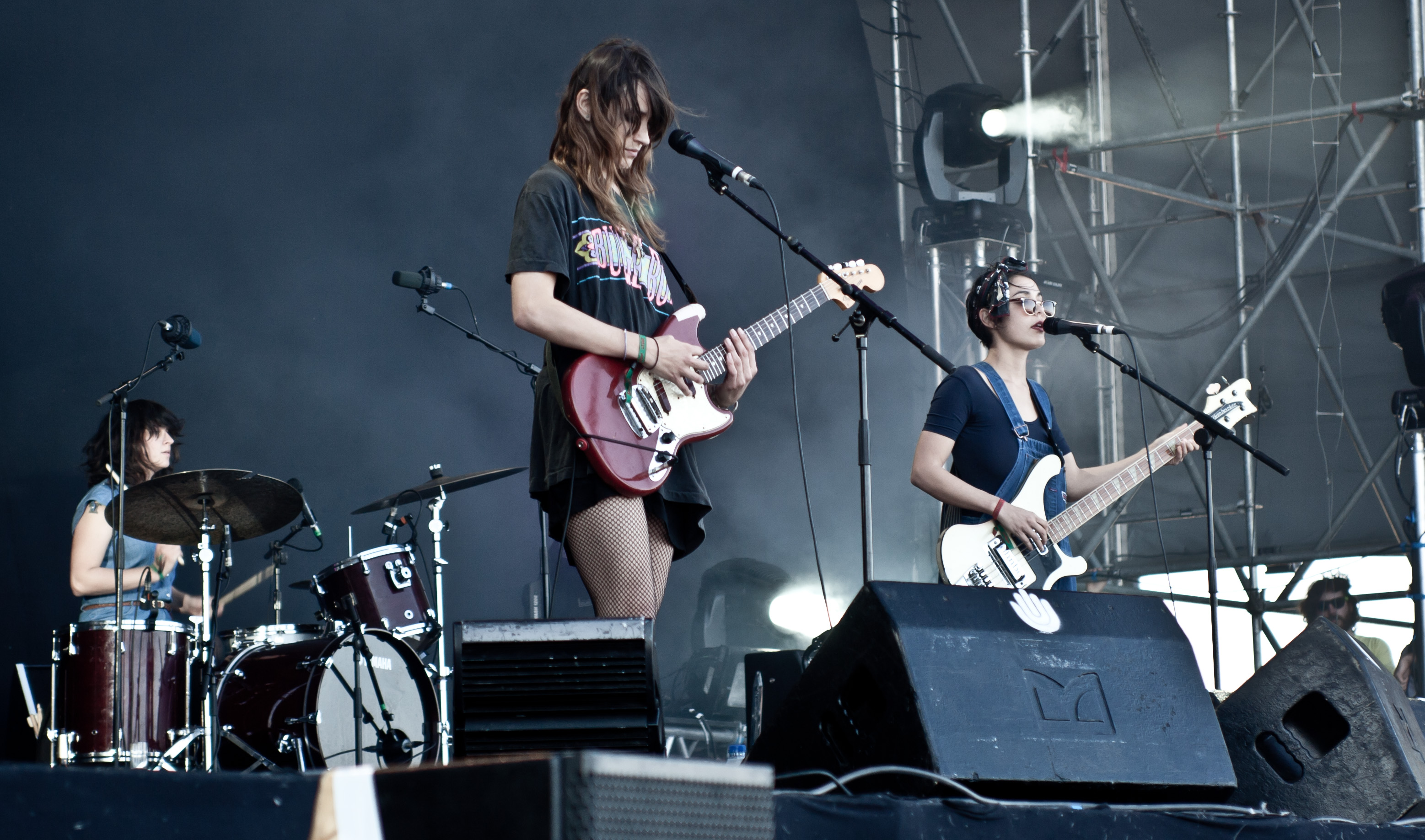
- Warpaint performing at Primavera Sound in Barcelona, Spain in May 2011
- Studio albums: 4
- Extended plays: 3
- Singles: 11
- Music videos: 7
- Miscellaneous: 4

The discography of Warpaint, an American indie rock band, consists of four studio albums, three EPs, eleven singles, and seven music videos.

Warpaint was formed in Los Angeles, California in 2004 by Emily Kokal (vocals, guitar), Theresa Wayman (guitar, vocals), Jenny Lee Lindberg (bass, backing vocals) and Shannyn Sossamon (drums, backing vocals). The band self-released its debut EP, Exquisite Corpse, in August 2008. The release, which was mixed by Red Hot Chili Peppers guitarist John Frusciante and featured Josh Klinghoffer, failed to chart but was well received by critics when reissued on Manimal Vinyl in October 2009.

Following a number of lineup changes, including the recruitment of current drummer Stella Mozgawa, Warpaint released its debut studio album, The Fool, in October 2010 on Rough Trade Records. The album received favorable critical acclaim, charted in mainstream and independent charts in the United States, the United Kingdom and Ireland, and was followed by over 12 months of extensive touring; it had sold approximately 60,000 copies in the UK and 150,000 copies worldwide as of January 2014. The band's eponymous second studio album, Warpaint, was released in January 2014 to largely positive reviews and placed in several international charts.

== Albums ==
=== Studio albums ===
List of studio albums, with selected chart positions and sales shown
Title	Album details	Peak chart positions										Sales	Certifications
Title	Album details	US	AUS	BEL (FL)	BEL (WA)	FRA	GER	IRL	NLD	SWI	UK	Sales	Certifications
The Fool	Released: October 22, 2010 (UK); Label: Rough Trade (580); Formats: 2×LP, CD, DD	176	—	—	—	—	—	75	—	—	41	UK: 60,000; Worldwide: 150,000	BPI: Silver
Warpaint	Released: January 17, 2014 (IRL); Label: Rough Trade (689); Formats: 2×LP, CD, DD	43	35	19	47	95	13	34	40	11	9		
Heads Up	Released: September 23, 2016 (US); Label: Rough Trade (780); Formats: CD, DD, LP	129	51	75	60	124	53	20	43	37	13		
Radiate Like This	Released: May 6, 2022; Label: Virgin; Formats: CD, DD, LP	— (Note: "Radiate Like This" did not enter the Billboard 200, but peaked at number 54 on the Billboard Top Album Sales Chart.)	—	74	68	— (Note: Radiate Like This did not enter the French Album Top 200, but peaked at number 70 on the French Top Album Physiques chart.)	24	—	— (Note: Radiate Like This did not enter the Netherlands' Album Top 100 but peaked on the Netherlands' Vinyl 33 Chart at number 23.)	26	21		
"—" denotes a recording that did not chart or was not released in that territory.

== Extended plays ==
List of extended plays
Title	Details
Exquisite Corpse	Released: August 2008 (US) (Note: "Exquisite Corpse" was self-released in August 2008 and reissued on Manimal in October 2009. Rough Trade reissued the EP in September 2010 and later included it as a bonus disc with deluxe editions of The Fool.); Labels: Self-released, Manimal (017), Rough Trade (599); Formats: CD, 12", DD
Rough Trade Session	Released: December 2, 2011 (US); Label: Rough Trade (DDS635); Format: DD
Keep It Healthy / Disco//Very Remixes	Released: June 16, 2014 (US); Label: Rough Trade; Formats: 12", DD

== Singles ==
=== Retail singles ===
List of singles, with selected chart positions
Single	Year	Peak chart positions							Album
Single	Year	US AAA	US Alt	US Rock Air.	BEL (FL) Tip	MEX Air.	UK Sales	UK Indie	Album
"Undertow"	2010	—	—	—	—	21	— (Note: "Undertow" did not enter the UK Singles Chart, but peaked at number 33 on the UK Physical Singles Chart Top 100.)	30	The Fool
"Shadows"	2011	—	—	—	—	—	—	—	The Fool
"Undertow / Warpaint"	2012	—	—	—	—	—	— (Note: "Undertow / Warpaint" did not enter the UK Singles Chart, but peaked at number 47 on the UK Physical Singles Chart Top 100.)	—	The Fool
"Crystalised" (Martina Topley-Bird feat. Mark Lanegan and Warpaint)	2013	—	—	—	—	—	—	—	Non-album single
"Love Is to Die"	2013	—	—	—	—	36	—	29	Warpaint
"Keep It Healthy"	2014	—	—	—	—	41	—	—	Warpaint
"The Chauffeur"	2014	—	—	—	—	—	—	—	Non-album singles
"No Way Out"/"I'll Start Believing"	2015	—	—	—	—	—	—	—	Non-album singles
"New Song"	2016	14	32	43	41	38	— (Note: "New Song" did not enter the UK Singles Chart, but peaked at number nine on the UK Physical Singles Chart Top 100.)	—	Heads Up
"Whiteout"	2016	—	—	—	—	—	— (Note: "Whiteout" did not enter the UK Singles Chart, but peaked at number four on the UK Physical Singles Chart Top 100.)	—	Heads Up
"Champion"	2022	—	—	—	—	—	—	—	Radiate Like This
"Stevie"	2022	—	—	—	—	—	—	—	Radiate Like This
"Common Blue"	2024	—	—	—	—	—	39	—	Non-album singles
"Underneath"	2024	—	—	—	—	—	—	—	Non-album singles
"—" denotes a release that did not chart.

=== Promotional singles ===
List of promotional-only singles
Single	Year	Peak chart positions		Album
Single	Year	MEX Air.	UK Phys.	Album
"Warpaint"	2011	—	—	The Fool
"Billie Holiday" (Steve Mackey Radio Mix)	2011	34	—	Exquisite Corpse
"Disco/Very"	2014	37	9	Warpaint

=== Split singles ===
List of split singles
Single	Year	Peak chart positions	Other artist
Single	Year	UK Phys.	Other artist
"Ashes to Ashes"/"Bewlay Brothers"	2010	63	Sister Crayon
"Feeling Alright"/"Winter"	2015	29	Daughter

== Music videos ==
List of music videos, with directors
Title	Year	Director(s)	Ref.
"Stars"	2009	Burke Roberts, Adam Harding	
"Elephants"	2010	Bruce Muller	
"Beetles"	2010	Takayuki Okada, Koji Nishida	
"Undertow"	2010	Shannyn Sossamon	
"Warpaint"	2011	Ted Newsome	
"Disco//very"	2014	Laban Pheidias	
"Keep It Healthy"	2014	Laban Pheidias	
"New Song"	2016	Warpaint	
"Champion"	2022	Theresa Wayman	
"Stevie"	2022	Fascinated By Everything	
"Hips"	2022	Jim Hosking	

== Miscellaneous appearances ==
List of appearances on compilation and soundtrack albums
Song	Year	Album	Notes	Ref.
"Ashes to Ashes"	2010	We Were So Turned On: A Tribute to David Bowie	From "Ashes to Ashes"/"Bewlay Brothers" split single with Sister Crayon	
"Elephants"	2010	NME Radar: The Best New Artists of 2010	From Exquisite Corpse	
"Undertow"	2013	True Blood: Music from the HBO Original Series, Vol. 4	From The Fool	
"Elephants"	2013	The Best of Manimal 2007–2013	From Exquisite Corpse	
"Paralysed"	2021	The Problem of Leisure: A Celebration of Andy Gill and Gang of Four		

=== Other appearances ===
Year	Song(s)	Artist	Album	Instrument(s)	Ref.
2014	"Voices in My Head" "War Drums"	SBTRKT	Wonder Where We Land	Vocals, drums	
