= LoveLaws =

Studio album by TT
- Released: May 18, 2018
- Recorded: 2010–2018
- Studios: House on the Hill (Los Angeles); Mr. Dan's (London)
- Genres: Downtempo; trip hop; electronica; art pop
- Length: 40:44
- Label: LoveLeaks
- Producers: Theresa Wayman; Ivan Wayman; Dan Carey; Money Mark

Singles from LoveLaws
- 1. "Love Leaks" Released: March 7, 2018; 2. "I've Been Fine" Released: April 5, 2018; 3. "The Dream" Released: May 4, 2018

LoveLaws is the debut studio album by the American musician Theresa Wayman. It was released under the pseudonym TT on May 18, 2018 on LoveLeaks, Wayman's own imprint. Produced over an eight-year period, LoveLaws style deviates from the music she created as a member of the indie rock band Warpaint and features a more electronic sound influenced by downtempo and trip hop. The album's lyrics explore several themes relating to the concept of love, including motherhood, self-empowerment and both romantic and platonic love.

Wayman self-produced LoveLaws with her brother Ivan, with additional production contributions from Dan Carey and Money Mark. It was recorded in several locations, including Wayman's home studio and Warpaint's personal studio in the United States and Carey's studio in London, England. Wayman only performed a small number of dates in the U.S. and England in support of LoveLaws' release, including appearances at Amoeba Music and the Museum of Contemporary Art in Los Angeles. Further promotion for LoveLaws included online sessions for Baeble Music in the US, Revista Martin in Mexico and Matches Fashion in England. Critical response to the album was largely positive.

== Background ==
Theresa Wayman initially began learning piano as a child, aged 10, in Eugene, Oregon. After she "dabbled in guitar" as a teenager, Wayman "got really serious" about music and songwriting, learning both guitar and drums by 21-years old. In 2004 she formed the indie rock band Warpaint in Los Angeles, California, with whom she released three studio albums—The Fool (2010), Warpaint (2014) and Heads Up (2016)—to critical acclaim.

In 2010 Wayman began the process of composing and recording solo material by "daydreaming about making music" using ideas that were "brewing since [she] was a teenager". She subsequently began learning to use the digital audio workstation Logic Pro by Apple, utilizing the application's drum machines and creating loops. Among the earliest tracks written by Wayman was an embryonic version of "The Dream".

Since Wayman was not signed to a record label as a solo artist, she was "free to experiment in whichever direction [she] wanted to" with her initial ideas for LoveLaws, as there was no release deadline to meet. She subsequently spent a further eight years writing and recording ideas for the album, which she called a "luxury". Describing the situation, Wayman said:

"Usually I'm up against time and money [but] with this, I didn't have that pressure. I did get to set things aside and wait to see how I felt about them later; if they had a longer shelf life then I knew it was right."

== Recording ==
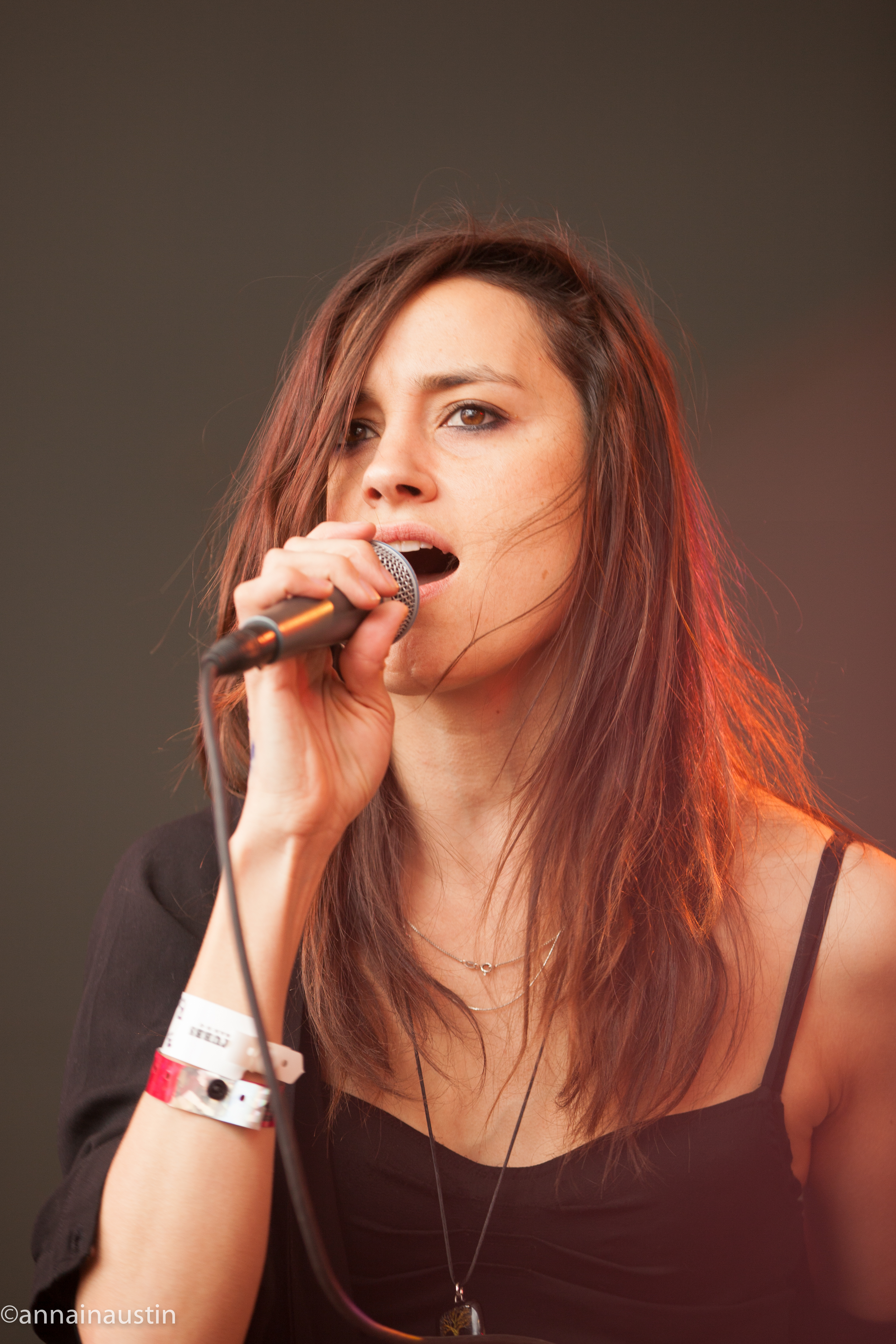
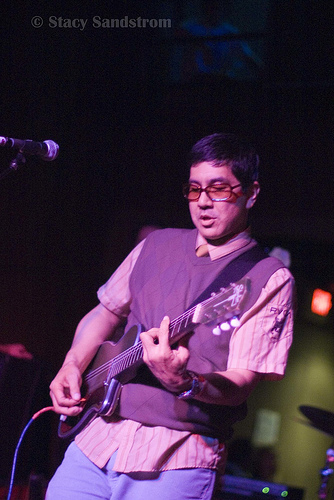
Wayman (left) was LoveLaws' main producer, as well as her brother Ivan. Dan Carey and Money Mark (right) co-produced and performed on two tracks each.

LoveLaws was recorded intermittently over an eight-year period from 2010 to 2018 in various locations, including Wayman's home studio; House on the Hill, Warpaint's personal studio in downtown Los Angeles, California; and Mr. Dan's, Dan Carey's studio in London, England. Wayman was the album's main producer, with further co-production from her brother Ivan and Carey, both of whom also performed as multi-instrumentalists. Ivan Wayman co-produced eight tracks; Carey co-produced two ("I've Been Fine" and "Too Sweet").

Beastie Boys collaborator Mark Ramos Nishita (Money Mark) was brought in by Wayman during the later sessions for the album. Instead of rearranging or reproducing the existing tracks, he and Wayman spent the sessions "just jamming", with Money Mark instead contributing "some really beautiful lines" that Wayman could then cut and paste throughout the album. Money Mark co-produced two tracks ("Love Leaks" and "Tutorial") and contributed electric piano on "Tutorial" and the synthesizer line in the chorus of "Love Leaks", which Wayman then further rearranged as the song's introduction.

All three other members of Warpaint were also part of the LoveLaws recording process. "Take One" features bassist Jenny Lee Lindberg, who Wayman instructed "to go crazy" during the song's instrumental bridge; "Safe" features drummer Stella Mozgawa, who Wayman "asked for some input" and who contributed synthesizers and drum fills; and "Too Sweet" features vocalist Emily Kokal singing "made of a lover", a lyric previously used on the Warpaint song "Biggy" from the band's eponymous second studio album four years prior.

Wayman spent the final year-and-a-half of the LoveLaws' production taking "all the bits and pieces" produced since 2010 "and putting it together" with Ivan. "Safe", which begins with a dialogue between a man and a woman whose voices are reversed, was originally intended to include sampled dialogue from a scene in Alfred Hitchcock's 1954 film Rear Window. Wayman said "it matched up perfectly" and "felt like it had to be there", but was ultimately replaced by dialogue recorded by Pete Checkvala and Wayman. The final sessions with Ivan included the rerecording of several of the album's vocal tracks; the final song to be completed was "The Dream". LoveLaws was subsequently mixed by Ivan and Shawn Everett and mastered by Dave Cooley at Elysian Masters in Los Angeles.

== Composition ==
"I think it’s a mood album. Like having a fireplace on. You can put it on and pay attention to it or just have it on in the background and feel good."

— Theresa Wayman describing LoveLaws

LoveLaws contains ten tracks, nine of which were written by Wayman. Of the nine tracks she penned, two were co-written with collaborators. "Mykki", the album's opener, was co-written with her brother Ivan Wayman and Joe Base; "Dram" was co-written with Ivan. One track ("Sassafras Interlude") was written and performed by Ludivine Anneliz, also known as "Sassafras". A multi-instrumentalist, Wayman performed several instruments on the album, including guitar, bass, synthesizers, samplers, piano, electric organ and both acoustic and digital drums.

LoveLaws' musical style has been noted for deviating from Wayman's "rather guitar-heavy roots" in Warpaint, with more of an emphasis on samples, "dark and moody synths", "sparse beats" and "Lynchian electronic noise"; Wayman herself has described the album as "a lot more electronic … and maybe more gentle" than Warpaint's sound. In particular, Wayman has cited the use of soundscapes by trip hop bands Portishead and Massive Attack as an influence on the album's sound, as well as soul artists Al Green and Sade, and the Icelandic musician Björk. Wayman dubbed the album's genre as "bedroom folk" while several publications have described it as downtempo, trip hop, electronica, and art pop. Wayman, although stressing she did not consider LoveLaws a work of ambient music, said that the album "fulfills the definition of ambient music in the sense that it's very mood driven and creates something to feel and think to and experience on a physical level."

Initially, Wayman wrote stream of consciousness-style lyrics for the songs on LoveLaws and avoided "revising music or lyrics in the pursuit of a raw, unfussy sound." However, during the process of "polishing ideas" for the final versions, she reworked several lyrics, approaching them by "wondering about … how to reconcile these different aspects of my life that don't necessarily go together". Wayman attributed the life-change of becoming a mother to her approach to songwriting with a newfound energy, acknowledging "It makes me get closer to the dreams I’ve always had. It makes me remember who I really am." Originally the songs on LoveLaws were "break-up ballads and aspirational love songs", which Wayman claims were her "romanticizing about having the perfect relationship when in real life, I wasn't able to have any relationship". Over the course of writing, the songs' subjects and themes "naturally expanded to include different influences", including motherhood, self-empowerment, and self-love. Wayman confirmed the overarching lyrical themes of LoveLaws as romantic love, but emphasised that "it's all kinds of facets of [love]", including platonic friendships and the concept of unconditional love, both "of the past and what [she had] been going through". Wayman's lyrics have been noted for their "emotional openness", which she herself commented on, claiming the album as a whole "evokes emotion more than being an intellectual album."

== Release ==
LoveLaws was released on May 18, 2018 in the United States and Europe on LoveLeaks, Wayman's own imprint, and distributed by Caroline International. The album was made available for streaming and digital download on several online services and issued on CD in both regions. A limited-edition rose-colored gatefold LP was released only in Europe. A Japanese CD pressing was distributed by Hostess Entertainment Unlimited and included a bonus track, "So To Be Forgot". LoveLaws' artwork was designed by Wayman, featuring photography by Delaram Pourabdi. Explaining the album's title, Wayman said she thought of it as "a good concept to build an album from. I was feeling ruled by love and romance, and also seeing love as being a fundamental of life in so many ways."

An album launch was held at Everyman Kings Cross in London four days prior to LoveLaws' official release. Hosted by Pitchblack Playback, a company who host album listening sessions in a pitch-black environment, the event included a question-and-answers session with Wayman. In further promotion of the album, Wayman performed online sessions for Baeble Music in the US, Revista Martin in Mexico, and Matches Fashion in England between March and October 2018. She also appeared as a guest and performed on BBC Radio 4's Woman's Hour.

Three singles were released from LoveLaws. The lead single, "Love Leaks", was released on March 7, 2018—the day the album was announced. The second single, "I've Been Fine", was released on April 5 with an accompanying music video directed by both Wulf Anderson and Wayman. The third and final single, "The Dream", was released on May 4.

Wayman made a conscious decision to not continuously tour in promotion of LoveLaws, citing the struggles of Warpaint's constant touring as a reason. She instead performed a small, six-date tour of England from May 17 to 23, 2018 supporting Nick Mulvey and performing a headline show at the Pickle Factory in London; the following week, LoveLaws placed at number 38 on the United Kingdom's Official Record Store Chart. Several small shows in California were subsequently announced between June and October, including appearances at MOCA Music at the Museum of Contemporary Art and Amoeba Music in Los Angeles.

== Reception ==
Professional ratings
Aggregate scores
Source	Rating
AnyDecentMusic?	6.8/10
Metacritic	70/100
Review scores
Source	Rating
American Songwriter	3/5 stars
Clash	7/10
DIY	4/5 stars
Hot Press	6/10
The Line of Best Fit	7/10
Loud and Quiet	8/10
NME	4/5 stars
Q	3/5 stars
The Skinny	4/5 stars

Upon its release LoveLaws received positive reviews from music critics. At Metacritic, which assigns a normalized rating out of 100 to reviews from mainstream publications, the album received an average score of 70, based on 9 reviews, indicating "generally favorable reviews". Clash writer Josh Gray praised LoveLaws as "refreshingly honest"—in particular its lyrical "frankness" and "intimacy"—but criticized the album as "more of a messy entry scrawled across the pages of a personal diary than it is a pristine, thought-out postcard". Gray summarized that "occasionally [the album's] composition feels scrappy or unfinished, but this doesn’t particularly mar the experience of listening to it", rating it seven out of ten. In a four-out-of-five-star review for DIY, Lisa Wright drew comparisons to Warpaint's releases and said LoveLaws "feel familiar yet riddled with something slightly sadder", concluding that the album was "an even more personal exploration of [Wayman's] affective talents."

Hot Press rated LoveLaws six out of ten, with Sam Steiger writing that "the overall mood is claustrophobic—the aural equivalent of a deep-sea journey … Enveloped in icy, Stygian depths, the sounds resonate with exaggerated meaning"; Steiger called the resulting sound "cool, downbeat and languid." Writing for The Line of Best Fit, Ross Horton referred to LoveLaws as "a resounding success", praised the album's "mastery of dynamics" and selected "The Dream" as the album's highlight, calling it "a groovy, down-tempo banger with thudding percussion sounds, densely layered atmospherics and Wayman's distinctive murmur"; Horton awarded the album a seven-out-of-ten rating. Loud and Quiet reviewer Tristan Gatward called LoveLaws "a resounding and devastating collection of songs about motherhood, loneliness and romance in an unromantic age" and "lyrically astute pop with shattering confessionalism", ultimately rating it eight out of ten.

In a four-out-of-five-star review for NME, Andrew Trendell said LoveLaws was "so driven by Wayman's personality, vivid lyricism and adventurous flair that it deserves to exist within its own realm", praising the album's "crisp production and open-hearted approach" and further calling it "a record not only to be listened to from start to finish, but a 'headphones' album if ever there was one." Katie Hawthorne of The Skinny rated the album four-out-of-five stars and said Wayman's "imagination is startling and singular". She referred to Wayman's songwriting as having a "slippery, shimmering quality", selecting "I've Been Fine", "Dram", "Safe" and "Too Sweet" as highlights from the album.

In a three-out-of-five-star review for American Songwriter, Hal Horowitz noted the album's preference for "atmospheric programmed beats, synths, piano and bass" over Wayman's usual use of guitar, adding that the resulting sound was "often throbbing, sensual … augmented by suggestive lyrics." Though further praising the album's "personal and riveting" lyrics and "enduring, durable and somewhat ageless vibe", Horowitz claimed LoveLaws "seems caught in a time warp of sorts" due to its "melodramatic tendencies" and "often creepy robot-on-narcotics sound". Q, in another three-out-of-five-star review, was similarly critical and said LoveLaws "feels like an act of introspection that's gone too far, one that might have benefited from a breath of fresh air, a trip outside its head."

== Track listing ==
All tracks are written by Theresa Wayman, unless otherwise noted.

No.	Title	Writer(s)	Length
1.	"Mykki"	Theresa Wayman; Ivan Wayman; Joe Bates	4:10
2.	"I've Been Fine"		4:01
3.	"Love Leaks"		6:02
4.	"The Dream"		3:57
5.	"Tutorial"		4:38
6.	"Dram"	T. Wayman; I. Wayman	4:39
7.	"Safe"		4:38
8.	"Sassafras Interlude"	Ludivine Anneliz ("Sassafras")	1:19
9.	"Take One"		4:18
10.	"Too Sweet"		3:54
Total length:			40:44

Japanese CD bonus track
No.	Title	Length
11.	"So To Be Forgot"	4:09
Total length:		44:53

== Personnel ==
All personnel credits adapted from LoveLaws' album notes.

Performers

- Theresa Wayman – vocals (1–7, 9, 10), synthesizer (1–3, 10), guitar (2, 5–7, 9), bass (1, 3–7, 9), piano (2–4), drum machine (1, 4, 5, 7, 9, 10), drums (5, 9), sampler (5, 7, 9), Hammond organ (10)
- Ivan Wayman – synthesizer (1, 6), strings (1, 4), drums (3, 4, 9), drum machine (6)
- Joe Bates – vocals (1)
- Dan Carey – drum machine (2, 10), guitar (2), Swarmatron (2), synthesizer (10)
- Guro Gikling – bass (2, 10)
- Money Mark – harmonium (3), synthesizer (3), percussion (3), electric piano (5)
- Alex Belmonte – guitar (3)
- Stella Mozgawa – drums (7), synthesizer (7)
- Anjolee Williams – additional vocals (7)
- Pete Checkvala – additional vocals (7)
- Graeme Blevins – clarinet (7)
- Ludivine Anneliz ("Sassafras") – vocals, guitar (8)
- Jenny Lee Lindberg – bass (9)
- Emily Kokal – additional vocals (10)

Technical personnel

- Theresa Wayman – production, arrangement
- Ivan Wayman – production (1, 3–9), arrangement (1, 3–9), mixing
- Dan Carey – production (2, 10), arrangement (2, 10)
- Money Mark – production (3, 5)
- Hal Ritson – additional production (7), additional programming (7)
- Richard Adlam – additional programming (7)
- Shawn Everett – mixing
- Dave Cooley – mastering

Design personnel

- Theresa Wayman – design, artwork
- Delaram Pourabdi – photography

== Chart positions ==
Chart (2018)	Peak position
UK Record Store (OCC)	38

== Release history ==
Region	Date	Format(s)	Label	Distributor	Catalog
United States	May 18, 2018	CD; digital download	LoveLeaks	Caroline International	2567450801
Europe	May 18, 2018	CD; LP; digital download	LoveLeaks	Caroline International	LL001
Japan	May 18, 2018	CD	LoveLeaks	Hostess Entertainment Unlimited	HSU-10188
