= Undertow (song) =

Song by American alternative rock band Warpaint

Single by Warpaint

from the album The Fool
- A-side: "Undertow"/"Warpaint"
- Released: September 21, 2010
- Recorded: 2010 at Curves Studio and The Boat Studio in Los Angeles, California
- Genre: Indie rock, art rock
- Length: 5:53
- Label: Rough Trade
- Songwriter: Warpaint
- Producer: Tom Biller

Warpaint singles chronology
"Undertow" (2010)	"Shadows" (2011)

Alternate cover

"Undertow" is a song by the American indie rock band Warpaint. It is the third track and lead single from the band's debut studio album The Fool, and was released on September 21, 2010, on Rough Trade Records. Described by the band as an homage to the Nirvana song "Polly", "Undertow" received favorable acclaim and placed in the United Kingdom's Independent Singles and Independent Breakers charts upon its release. A limited edition double A-side single was released as part of the Record Store Day 2012.

Describing the origins of the song, bassist Jenny Lee Lindberg said "Undertow" developed from a bassline she and guitarist Theresa Wayman were working on. According to Lindberg, "[Wayman] just started singing the lyrics to 'Polly' over that song … instead of making that a cover … we said, 'well, write your own words to the song'." Lindberg added that if "you listen to the songs back-to-back they sound nothing alike" but referred to "Undertow" as "a bit of an homage to Kurt [Cobain] and Nirvana." A music video for "Undertow" was directed by Lindberg's sister and former Warpaint drummer Shannyn Sossamon.

== Track listing ==
All songs written and composed by Warpaint.

Digital download

1. "Undertow"– 5:53

Record Store Day 7"

1. "Undertow"– 5:53
2. "Warpaint"– 5:54

== Personnel ==
All personnel credits adapted from The Fool's album notes.

Warpaint

- Emily Kokal – vocals, guitar
- Theresa Wayman – vocals, guitar
- Jenny Lee Lindberg – bass, backing vocals
- Stella Mozgawa – drums, keyboards

Technical personnel

- Tom Bille – production, recording
- Nina Walsh –engineering
- Sonny DiPerri – assistant engineering
- Andrew Weatherall – mixing

== Chart positions ==
Chart (2010)	Peak position
UK Independent Singles Chart	30
UK Independent Singles Breakers Chart	10
