= Shadows (Warpaint song) =

Song by Warpaint

Single by Warpaint

from the album The Fool
- B-side: "Warpaint"
- Released: January 10, 2011
- Recorded: 2010 at Curves Studio and The Boat Studio in Los Angeles, California
- Genre: Alternative rock, art rock
- Length: 4:04
- Label: Rough Trade
- Songwriter: Warpaint
- Producer: Tom Biller

Warpaint singles chronology
"Undertow" (2010)	"Shadows" (2011)	"Shadows" (2011)

Alternate cover
- Cover for the 12" vinyl release.

"Shadows" is a song by American alternative rock band Warpaint, written collectively by band members Theresa Wayman, Emily Kokal, Jenny Lee Lindberg and Stella Mozgawa. The song was released as the band's second single, and second and final single from the band's debut studio album The Fool, on January 10, 2011 on Rough Trade Records.

== Track listing ==
- Digital download
1. "Shadows" (Neon Lights remix) – 3:15
- 12" vinyl
1. "Shadows" – 4:04
2. "Undertow" (Javelin remix)

== Personnel ==
Warpaint

- Emily Kokal – guitar
- Jenny Lee Lindberg – bass guitar, backing vocals
- Stella Mozgawa – drums, keyboards
- Theresa Wayman – vocals, guitar

Technical personnel

- Tom Biller – producer, recording, mixing
- Sonny DiPerri – assistant engineer
- Nina Walsh – engineer
