= Pitchblack Playback =

Pitchblack Playback is a deep listening event founded in 2006 held primarily in London and occasionally in other cities across the world where audiences listen to new, upcoming and classic album releases in the dark.

The events are generally held in seated cinema spaces and the audience wear blindfolds in addition to the lights in the room being switched off.

The event was created by London DJ, producer and entrepreneur, Ben Gomori and has been held in cities including New York, Paris, Berlin, Tokyo and Los Angeles.

== Album premieres ==
Pitchblack Playback has held world and regional premieres for albums including Daniel Avery and Alessandro Cortini's 'Illusion Of Time', Andrew Bayer's 'In My Life', the Record Store Day vinyl edition of Ian Brown's 'Solarized' and 'LoveLaws' by Warpaint member Theresa Wayman under the moniker TT.

== Partnerships ==
Pitchblack Playback partnered with the inaugural Record Store Day offshoot National Album Day in October 2018 for an afternoon of free-to-attend playbacks in London. They partnered with the British Film Institute as part of the 2019 London Film Festival to host free-to-attend playbacks for classic albums by Fela Kuti and Miles Davis.
