= New Song =

New Song may refer to:

- "A New Song", a pamphlet of poems, chants, ballads and songs published by the International Workers Order in 1938

== Music ==
=== Songs ===
- "New Song" (Howard Jones song), a 1983 song
- "New Song" (Warpaint song), a 2016 song
- "New Song" (The Who song), a 1978 song
- "New Song", a song by Avail from their 2000 album One Wrench
- "New Song" a song by UK Pop-Punk band Son of Dork
- "New Song", a song by Sublime on their debut album 40 Oz. to Freedom
- "New Song", a song by Maggie Rogers featuring Del Water Gap on her 2020 album Notes from the Archive: Recordings 2011-2016

=== Other ===
- NewSong, a contemporary Christian music group
- New Song, a music ministry and recording group sponsored by Geneva College
- The New Song movement, Nueva canción, an Ibero-American movement and musical genre whose lyrics focus on social justice issues, originating in the 2016
  - The New Song, La Nova Cançó, a Catalan music movement during francoism

== Churches ==
- New Song Church, a church in Fair Lawn, New Jersey, United States
- Newsong Church, a church in Santa Ana, California, United States, which was formerly a megachurch with several global locations

== See also ==
- New (disambiguation) § Songs, for a listing of songs titled "New"
