= Follow the Cyborg =

Studio album by Miss Grit
- Released: February 24, 2023
- Genre: Electronic; indie rock; indie pop
- Length: 35:11
- Language: English; Korean
- Label: Mute
- Producer: Margaret Sohn

Miss Grit chronology
Imposter (2021)	Follow the Cyborg (2023)

Follow the Cyborg is the debut full-length album by American musician Margaret Sohn under the alias Miss Grit, released on February 24, 2023, through Mute Records. Sohn produced the album and recorded it in her apartment in New York City. It received acclaim from critics.

== Background ==
Sohn took inspiration from the films Ex Machina and Her in making the album, adopting the cyborg persona "Miss Grit". She recorded the album in a studio in her apartment in New York City.

== Critical reception ==
Professional ratings
Aggregate scores
Source	Rating
Metacritic	82/100
Review scores
Source	Rating
AllMusic	4/5 stars
No Ripcord	8/10
The Skinny	4/5 stars
Slant Magazine	3.5/5 stars
Under the Radar	8/10 stars

Follow the Cyborg received a score of 82 out of 100 on review aggregator Metacritic based on seven critics' reviews, indicating "universal acclaim". AllMusic's Heather Phares wrote that Sohn's "vocals may be soothing, but their guitars and synths are seething. On their debut album, Miss Grit questions norms more artfully than ever". Anita Bhadani of The Skinny wrote that "sonically, melodic hooks meet artful arrangements to skilful effect" on the album, on which Sohn's "vocal delivery is nonchalant yet emotive in turn, evoking a compelling surreality". Bhadani summarized the album as a "striking debut with both surrealist sensibilities and melodic hooks – marking Miss Grit as one to watch".

Slant Magazine's Steve Erickson remarked that the album "fits neatly into the current indie-pop landscape, [but] its songs don't rely on traditional repeated hooks, instead unfurling more organically", with Sohn's electric guitar "integrated seamlessly into the album's largely electronic production". Matt the Raven of Under the Radar felt that Sohn "impresses and excites with sophisticated and soothing electronic foundations adorned with waves of atmospheric indie rock wrapped in creative melodies with waiflike vocals that will not only perk your ears but fit within the concept". Reviewing the album for The Quietus, Aug Stone stated that Sohn "dials down the dimmer switch for a more intimate entry into their songs" from her preceding two EPs.

Mark Moody of No Ripcord wrote that "Sohn masterfully handles a crush of guitar and synths while a small batch of guests provide string embellishments" and "the lack of hiss or other background noise shows Sohn's proficiency with her approach as well as the technical advances that machines have brought to music". Ryan Dillon of Glide Magazine opined that "the cinematic nature of this album stems from the structure of its songs. Miss Grit is able to create whirlwinds of instrumentals that build on top of each other into dense textures, each element added as vital as the next".

== Track listing ==
All tracks are written by Margaret Sohn, except "Perfect Blue" and "Follow the Cyborg", co-written with Stella Mozgawa, and "Syncing", co-written with Nicole Rodriguez.

Follow the Cyborg track listing
No.	Title	Length
1.	"Perfect Blue"	2:46
2.	"Your Eyes Are Mine"	3:23
3.	"Nothing's Wrong"	3:49
4.	"Lain (Phone Clone)"	4:01
5.	"Buffering"	1:04
6.	"Follow the Cyborg"	4:45
7.	"사이보그를 따라와" (Saibogeuleul ttalawa; "Follow the Cyborg")	2:42
8.	"Like You"	3:50
9.	"The End"	4:34
10.	"Syncing"	4:17
Total length:		35:11
