= Heads Up (Warpaint album) =

Studio album by Warpaint
- Released: September 23, 2016
- Recorded: January–May 2016
- Studios: House on the Hill (Los Angeles, California, United States); Papap's Palace (Los Angeles)
- Genres: Art rock; indietronica
- Length: 51:16
- Label: Rough Trade
- Producers: Jake Bercovici; Warpaint

Warpaint chronology
Warpaint (2014)	Heads Up (2016)	Radiate Like This (2022)

Singles from Heads Up
- 1. "New Song" Released: August 1, 2016; 2. "Whiteout" Released: September 19, 2016

Heads Up is the third studio album by the American indie rock band Warpaint. It was released on September 23, 2016 on Rough Trade Records. Heads Up was produced by Warpaint and Jake Bercovici, who had previously worked with the band on their debut extended play, Exquisite Corpse (2008). The album was preceded by the single "New Song".

== Background ==
Warpaint released its second studio album Warpaint in January 2014 to generally favorable reviews. The band toured in promotion of the album until summer 2015, after which its members began separate projects. Vocalist and guitarist Emily Kokal collaborated with folk musician Paul Bergmann, contributing vocals to Bergmann's extended play Romantic Thoughts (2015); vocalist and guitarist Theresa Wayman formed a supergroup, BOSS, with Sarah Jones of Hot Chip and Guro Gikling of All We Are, and recorded material for a solo album; drummer Stella Mozgawa recorded with Kurt Vile, Cate Le Bon and Kim Gordon; and bassist Jenny Lee Lindberg released her debut solo album, Right On! (2015), on which Mozgawa also performed drums. According to Lindberg, each member's projects gave the band a "fresh perspective" when writing material for Heads Up.

In an interview with NME in early 2015, Warpaint declared its original intention to release single songs over a period of time in lieu of a third studio album. Wayman explained that the process of "writing, recording, mixing, mastering, releasing, touring … it's two years dedicated to one thing. We want to do bits here and there, like back in the day when they used to make single [sic]." Kokal added that the band's writing process had become more simplified and that when the band "agree that we're stoked about [a new song], we're done. That's a lesson we've learned—not to overanalyse". "No Way Out", a song originally intended for Warpaint, was released in February 2015 and "I'll Start Believing" was released in March; both songs, and a "redux" version of "No Way Out", were released together as a double A-side single the same month.

== Recording ==
Warpaint began recording sessions for Heads Up on January 12, 2016 with producer Jake Bercovici, who had produced the band's debut EP, Exquisite Corpse (2008), and the 2015 single "No Way Out"/"I'll Start Believing". The album was recorded at House on the Hill—a studio in downtown Los Angeles, California—and Papap's Palace, with additional recording taking place at each band member's home studios. Describing the process of recording individually, Mozgawa said: "The doors were a little more open in terms of what was accepted and what wasn't, because we were sharing ideas so rapidly between us"; Lindberg said that each member "was allowed to have their space, time and creative freedom with songs". The band regularly updated its Instagram account with images and video from the sessions. According to one post, the band finished mixing Heads Up on May 9.

== Composition ==
Consequence of Sound referred to Heads Up as "an eclectic collection" influenced stylistically by Björk, Janet Jackson, Kendrick Lamar and Outkast, and Crack magazine described it as an "au courant post-genre exploration of the sounds [the band members] grew up hearing", noting that the album includes a track titled "Dre", a reference to the rapper and hip-hop producer Dr. Dre; Warpaint included a track titled "Biggy", a reference to the Notorious B.I.G. According to Lindberg, Heads Up is less guitar-oriented than the band's back catalogue and "half of the album has more emphasis on guitar and the other has less"; Lindberg considers Heads Up as "[sounding] like a mature version of Warpaint". Crack considered three of the album's tracks ("New Song", "So Good" and "Dre") as alternative pop "potentials", which are "a reflection of the times … dealing in moody atmospherics and left-of-center reworkings of mainstream trends".

Describing Heads Up just prior to the album's recording sessions, Mozgawa said her rhythms were "a little more dancey" and "a little higher on the BPM scale" in comparison to Warpaint's earlier material. Kokal further described the album's rhythms as "dancier, faster and fun", noting that Heads Up best captured the "spirit" of the band's live performances. Mozgawa used computer-based drum machines to compose several of the songs' drum patterns in early 2015, after she sustained a foot injury which left her unable to physically perform.

== Release ==
Heads Up was released worldwide on September 23, 2016 on Rough Trade Records. It was released on CD, standard and deluxe-edition LP and as a digital download. The deluxe-edition double LP was printed on pink and black vinyl and includes an exclusive 7-inch of the double A-side single "No Way Out"/"I'll Start Believing". The album was announced in an official press release on August 1, 2016, however, several Japanese online retailers—including Amazon Japan and Tower Records Japan—listed it for pre-order three weeks prior. A 30-second teaser video, featuring the band members on a rooftop and a clip of "New Song", was uploaded to YouTube by Rough Trade on July 28, and "New Song" was released as the album's lead single on August 1 as a digital download, online stream and single-sided 7-inch.

Warpaint toured Heads Up from August to November 2016. The band announced several international dates in Europe and North America, beginning on August 18 at Pukkelpop in Hasselt, Belgium and concluding on November 4 at Iceland Airwaves in Reykjavík, Iceland. During a short two-date tour of the United Kingdom in July prior to the album's announcement, the band debuted "New Song", and debuted "White Out" at a one-off show as part of the School Night series at Baby's All Right in Brooklyn, New York later the same month. Since then "The Stall", "So Good", "Heads Up" and "Today Dear" have also been performed live.

== Critical reception ==
Professional ratings
Aggregate scores
Source	Rating
AnyDecentMusic?	7.1/10
Metacritic	74/100
Review scores
Source	Rating
AllMusic	4/5 stars
Chicago Tribune	3/4 stars
The Guardian	4/5 stars
The Independent	3/5 stars
The Irish Times	3/5 stars
Mojo	4/5 stars
NME	4/5
Pitchfork	6.7/10
Q	3/5 stars
Rolling Stone	3.5/5 stars

Upon its release Heads Up was well received by music critics. At Metacritic, which assigns a normalized rating out of 100 to reviews from mainstream critics, the album reviewed an average score of 74, based on 24 reviews, indicating "generally favorable reviews". The album has been characterized as art rock and indietronica.

Accolades for Heads Up
Publication	Accolade	Year	Rank
American Songwriter	Top 50 Albums of 2016	2016	39
Rough Trade	Albums of the Year	2016	95

== Track listing ==
All tracks are written by Warpaint.

No.	Title	Length
1.	"Whiteout"	4:42
2.	"By Your Side"	4:32
3.	"New Song"	4:16
4.	"The Stall"	4:55
5.	"So Good"	5:59
6.	"Don't Wanna"	3:42
7.	"Don't Let Go"	4:21
8.	"Dre"	3:58
9.	"Heads Up"	4:57
10.	"Above Control"	5:05
11.	"Today Dear"	4:49
Total length:		51:16

Japanese Bonus Tracks
No.	Title	Length
12.	"I'll Start Believing"	2:58
13.	"No Way Out"	7:20
Total length:		61:34

== Personnel ==
All personnel credits adapted from Heads Up's album notes.

Warpaint

- Emily Kokal
- Jenny Lee Lindberg
- Stella Mozgawa
- Theresa Wayman

Additional musicians

- Jake Bercovici – synthesizer, programming

Technical

- Jake Bercovici – production, engineering, mixing
- Warpaint – production
- Ivan Wayman – engineering
- Shawn Everett – mixing
- Stephen Marcussen – mastering

Design

- H. Hawkline – design, cover art
- Ken Life – design, cover art
- Mia Kirby – photography

== Charts ==
Chart (2016)	Peak position
Australian Albums (ARIA)	51
Belgian Albums (Ultratop Flanders)	75
Belgian Albums (Ultratop Wallonia)	60
Dutch Albums (Album Top 100)	43
French Albums (SNEP)	47
German Albums (Offizielle Top 100)	53
Irish Albums (IRMA)	20
Japanese Albums Chart	298
New Zealand Heatseekers Albums (RMNZ)	1
Portuguese Albums (AFP)	33
Scottish Albums (Official Charts)	14
Swiss Albums (Schweizer Hitparade)	37
UK Albums (Official Charts)	13
US Billboard 200	129

== Release history ==
Region	Date	Format	Label	Distributor	Catalog
Various	September 23, 2016	2×LP, CD, digital download, LP	Rough Trade	Rough Trade	RTRAD780
Japan	September 23, 2016	CD	Rough Trade	Hostess Entertainment	BGJ-4028
