= Andy Clockwise =

Australian-born musician

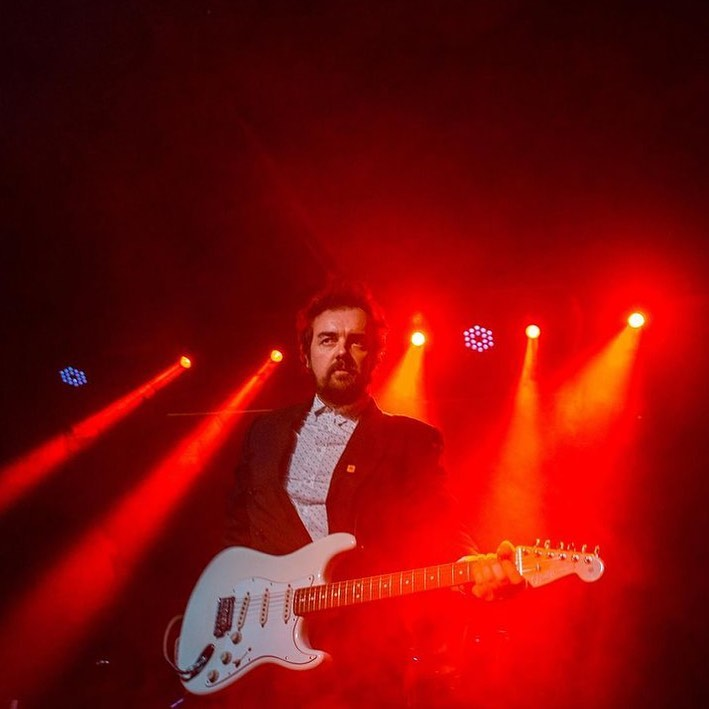
- Andy Clockwise Performs at The Echo, Los Angeles, California

Background information
- Also known as: Andy Clockwise
- Born: Andy Kelly; Sydney, Australia
- Genres: Alternative dance, indie, nu-folk, new wave, post punk, folk, classic pop, rock, electronic, theatre
- Occupation: Songwriter performer multi-instrumentalist producer actor writer
- Years active: 2005–present
- Label: ABC Music Universal Music Publishing Exhibition Records
- Website: http://www.andyclockwise.org

Andy Clockwise (born Andy Kelly) is an Australian-born, Los Angeles-based musician, songwriter, producer, and multi-instrumentalist. Clockwise released the EP Song Exhibition and the albums Classic FM and The Socialite, which included the singles "Every Song," "Dancing World," and "Love & War." In November 2005, Classic FM was selected as a Triple J feature album, which was followed by national tours across Australia and the United States, performing alongside acts such as Warpaint, Julian Casablancas, and Juliette Lewis. He held performance residencies at the Troubadour and Spaceland in Los Angeles. Clockwise operates a solo production and home recording model, and has released multiple EPs and full-length albums including collaborations such as "Open Relationship" featuring Stella Mozgawa.

== Early years ==
Andy Clockwise was born Andy Kelly in Sydney, Australia, into an artistic family. Although little is publicly known about his early life, Clockwise has noted that his upbringing was influenced by his sisters and father, who introduced him to folk, punk rock, and classical music. He learned to play multiple instruments during childhood. Clockwise attended the Sydney Conservatorium of Music, where he began a Bachelor of Music Composition. During this period, he regularly performed three-hour acoustic sets in Sydney’s Kings Cross. After gaining early support from Triple J, which began to feature his music, he left university to pursue a solo career.

== Band history ==
=== 2004–2007: Song Exhibition EP, Classic FM Double Album, and National Tour ===
Andy Clockwise first gained attention with his Song Exhibition EP, which he recorded independently at the house of fellow musician Bertie Blackman’s mother while Blackman was working on her own debut EP. Following this release in 2004, Clockwise recorded a double concept album, Classic FM, inspired by an imaginary radio station. He wrote, produced, engineered, and mixed Classic FM in his home studio, embracing a DIY approach. The album was selected as a Triple J Feature Album, significantly boosting his profile and leading to a sold-out headline tour across Australia. During these years, Clockwise performed at Sydney venues such as the Hopetoun and the Annandale Hotel.

=== 2007–2011: Move to Los Angeles, Are You Well?, and The Socialite ===
After a stint in New York theatre, Andy Clockwise moved to Los Angeles following a meeting and decided to stay permanently. Describing the experience as "starting again," he said, "I bought Christmas lights for my acoustic guitar and started playing anywhere and everywhere." Within a year, Clockwise had gained traction in the Los Angeles live music scene, securing a Monday night headline slot at Spaceland in Silverlake. His performances began receiving airplay on local radio stations KCRW and KROQ, eventually leading to sold-out shows at notable venues, including the Troubadour and The El Rey Theatre, in support of his independently released EPs.

In 2010, Clockwise released Are You Well? as a promotional radio EP for the U.S. To support the album, he toured with Julian Casablancas, frontman of The Strokes. In February 2011, his single "Love and War" was featured on an episode of the CW drama 90210, and the EP also included his popular live cover of Björk's "Hyperballad."

Later in 2011, Clockwise released the studio album ''The Socialite''. The album included the single "Love and War," which reached the top of the North American radio charts, and "The Casanova (Remember Love)," featured in an episode of CSI: Miami in May 2011.

=== 2012–2017: Dancing World and The Good Book EPs ===
Andy Clockwise’s 2013-14 EP Dancing World was shaped by his experiences both on the road and in the United States. Clockwise described the EP as "a pop musical ode to dysfunctionality" and added, "It's about the wars we put each other through." The music blended elements of folk and electronic styles. To promote the EP, Clockwise toured with bands such as The Adicts and Warpaint. The singles "Steam Dream", "Murphy's Law", and "Hopeless" (featuring Holly Valance) received airplay on Los Angeles radio stations, while "Dancing World" reached #12 on the FMQB Specialty Radio Chart.

In 2015, Clockwise began working on his next project, ''The Good Book'' EP, recording material in Hollywood, Australia, and London.

The video for the EP’s first single, "Open Relationship," premiered in Interview Magazine in November 2015. In early 2016, Clockwise embarked on a North American tour as a guest for "Dance Yourself Clean," performing in cities including Washington D.C., San Francisco, Seattle, Atlanta, Brooklyn, and San Diego. In March 2016, he was invited to perform at an official showcase at the South by Southwest (SXSW) Music Conference. The Good Bookwas released on April 8, 2016, through Exhibition Records, and included the single "The Best."

=== 2018- Present: "War Stories" & Exhibition Records ===
In 2018, Clockwise began writing a musical titled "The Moth Requiem" and working on a four-volume album titled "War Stories". It was originally slated for a release with an extensive tour of the United States in 2021, but the 40 date tour was shut down due to the COVID-19 pandemic.

Clockwise returned to Australia during this period, where he produced and wrote material for other musical artists.

The album project, War Stories, features contributions from Omar Yakar, Drew Erickson, JT Thomas, Stella Mozgawa, and Jade Macrae, and was recorded in Los Angeles, London, and Sydney.

In 2020-2022, Clockwise teased songs and videos to War Stories, his new album, along with a single, “Gonna Get It (Just What We Deserve)”. He was the sole producer of this album.

Andy has announced a return to playing live again and has been doing sporadic dates through the United States and Australia.

== Music style ==
Andy Clockwise cites Charlie Chaplin, Bob Dylan, Tom Waits, Björk, The Pixies, David Bowie, and Nick Cave as influences. Also, Dire Straits and Lijadu Sisters were mentioned as influences during an interview with Y! Entertainment. Clockwise's music has been compared to LCD Soundsystem and Nick Cave. He came out of the nu-folk/indie rock movements of Sydney & Los Angeles.

== Discography ==
=== Albums ===
List of albums, with selected details
Title	Details
Classic FM	Released: 2005; Format: CD, Digital; Label: Fly Music, Warner Music Australia (5101105852)
The Socialite	Released: 2010; Format: CD, Digital; Label: ABC Music (2736570)

=== Extended plays ===
List of EPs, with selected details
Title	Details
Song Exhibition	Released: 2004; Format: CD; Label: Shock (ACW001)
Dancing World	Released: 2014; Format: CD, Digital; Label: Andy Clockwise
The Good Book	Released: 2016; Format: CD, Digital; Label: Andy Clockwise

== Touring Musicians ==
- Alisha Fraher – Bass, Guitar, Keys, Vocals
- Jamie Douglass – Drums
- Mathew Gardner - Drums
- Stella Mozgawa - Drums
- Josh Norton - Bass, Guitar, Keys, Vocals
