= Belief (Belief album) =

2022 studio album by Belief

Studio album by Belief
- Released: July 15, 2022
- Studio: Abso Lutely
- Genre: Electronic, house
- Length: 44:13
- Label: Lex
- Producer: Boom Bip; Stella Mozgawa

Belief is the debut studio album by Los Angeles based duo Belief, released on July 17, 2022, through Lex Records.

== Recording ==
Belief was recorded by electronic music producer Bryan Hollon and drummer Stella Mozgawa over a period of five years, beginning with jam sessions in Eric Wareheim's studios in 2016.

Hollon told Talkhouse that the recording process was unusual for both of them, "really what we were inspired by was that kind of early '90s acid house scene, which a lot of times that was one or two people with a bunch of machines hooked into each other playing live, because there really wasn’t a good way to track things in that era separately"

On album track "Dreams" Mozgawa played live hi-hat, snare, and percussion over the programmed drum machines. On "Wot" Mozgawa played the main atonal synthline on an Oberheim synthesiser, then Hollon added further instrumentation.

Speaking to The Line of Best Fit, Hollon described the recording of album track "Ulu", "The pad loop was the foundation and the addition of the 303 bass line brought me back to an era of music we both love. Once the improvised tracks were laid down live, we went back and added a drum break played by Stella and I added a bass guitar."

== Critical reception ==
Professional ratings
Review scores
Source	Rating
Mojo	4/5 stars
Spectrum Culture	75%
Uncut	8/10

Belief received a positive review from Bandcamp Daily, where it was 'Album of the Day', and they described it as "The sibilant bleeps and murky acid basslines that were a staple for LFO find themselves reincarnated via Mogzawa and Hollon’s productions."

At BrooklynVegan where it was 'Album of the Week' and made their July 'Albums of the Year So Far' list, it was described as "an album that is a wonderful tribute to a time, place and person, but also a killer record in its own right, not to mention a lot of fun, and it's loaded with bleep-y bangers."

In a positive review, Mojo described the album as ranging between tracks with "radiant expansions and contractions" and tracks where "claustrophobia kicks in with Drexciya intensity".

KCRW named "Ulu" as 'Today's Top Tune' on April 22, 2022. BrooklynVegan called "Wot" an "absolute banger". Stereogum described "I Want To Be" as "a skittery instrumental that truly evokes the early rave era, both in its hard breakbeats and its zonked-out astral tone."

== Track listing ==
No.	Title	Length
1.	"I Want to Be"	4:05
2.	"Anx"	3:07
3.	"Bayo"	4:14
4.	"Luther"	4:07
5.	"Dreams"	3:54
6.	"Nebo"	5:46
7.	"Wot"	3:53
8.	"Ulu"	5:26
9.	"Jung"	4:45
10.	"Art of Love"	2:45
11.	"Charch"	2:07
