= Miss Grit =

American electronic musician

Margaret Dewey Sohn, known professionally as Miss Grit, is an American electronic musician. She is based in Queens, New York.

== Biography ==
Sohn was raised in Grosse Pointe, Michigan and has one parent of Korean ethnicity. After completing high school in Michigan, Sohn studied music technology at New York University and took the moniker Miss Grit for recording, releasing a debut EP, Talk Talk, in 2019. A second EP, Impostor, followed in 2021 before Miss Grit signed with Mute Records, who released the full-length Follow the Cyborg in February 2023. Her second album, Under My Umbrella, was released on April 24, 2026.

== Discography ==
=== Albums ===
- Follow the Cyborg (Mute Records, 2023)
- Under My Umbrella (Mute Records, 2026)

=== Extended plays ===
- Talk Talk (Self-released, 2019)
- Impostor (Self-released, 2021)
