= Stella Mozgawa =

Australian musician (born 1986)

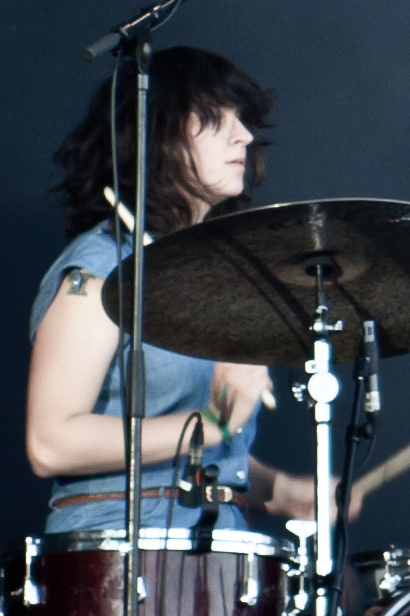
- Mozgawa in 2011

Background information
- Born: Sydney, Australia
- Genres: Psychedelic rock, indie rock, hard rock
- Instruments: Drums, bass, keyboards, vocals, guitar
- Years active: 2007–present
- Member of: Warpaint

Stella Mozgawa is an Australian drummer and record producer, best known as a member of the indie rock band Warpaint, with whom she has recorded four studio albums. Alongside her work with Warpaint, Mozgawa is one half of the electronica duo Belief, and is a former member the hard rock collective Desert Sessions.

Mozgawa is a regular studio collaborator of Kurt Vile and Cate Le Bon, and has contributed to albums by St. Vincent, John Grant, Sharon Van Etten, Adam Green, the xx, Tim Presley, Tom Jones, Kim Gordon and Regina Spektor.

As a record producer, Mozgawa co-produced Courtney Barnett's third album, Things Take Time, Take Time (2021), and its follow-up soundtrack album, End of the Day (2023), as well as Creature of Habit (2026). In 2023, she produced the all-female soundtrack to the Apple TV+ historical drama TV series, The Buccaneers.

== Biography ==
=== Childhood and early life ===
Growing up in Sydney, Mozgawa was raised by her Polish parents, who had moved from Poland to Australia to perform music together as a musical duo.

At age 13, Mozgawa began playing the drums and was initially influenced by the drummer Zac Hanson from the pop band Hanson. She explained, "For a lot of people who are a half-generation older than me it was Tommy Lee, but for me it was Zac Hanson from Hanson. I'm probably in a smaller group of people who were really turned on to the profession by that particular man." At age 14, Mozgawa pretended to be a "20-year-old Polish immigrant with no ID" to perform at Sydney music venues.

=== With Warpaint ===
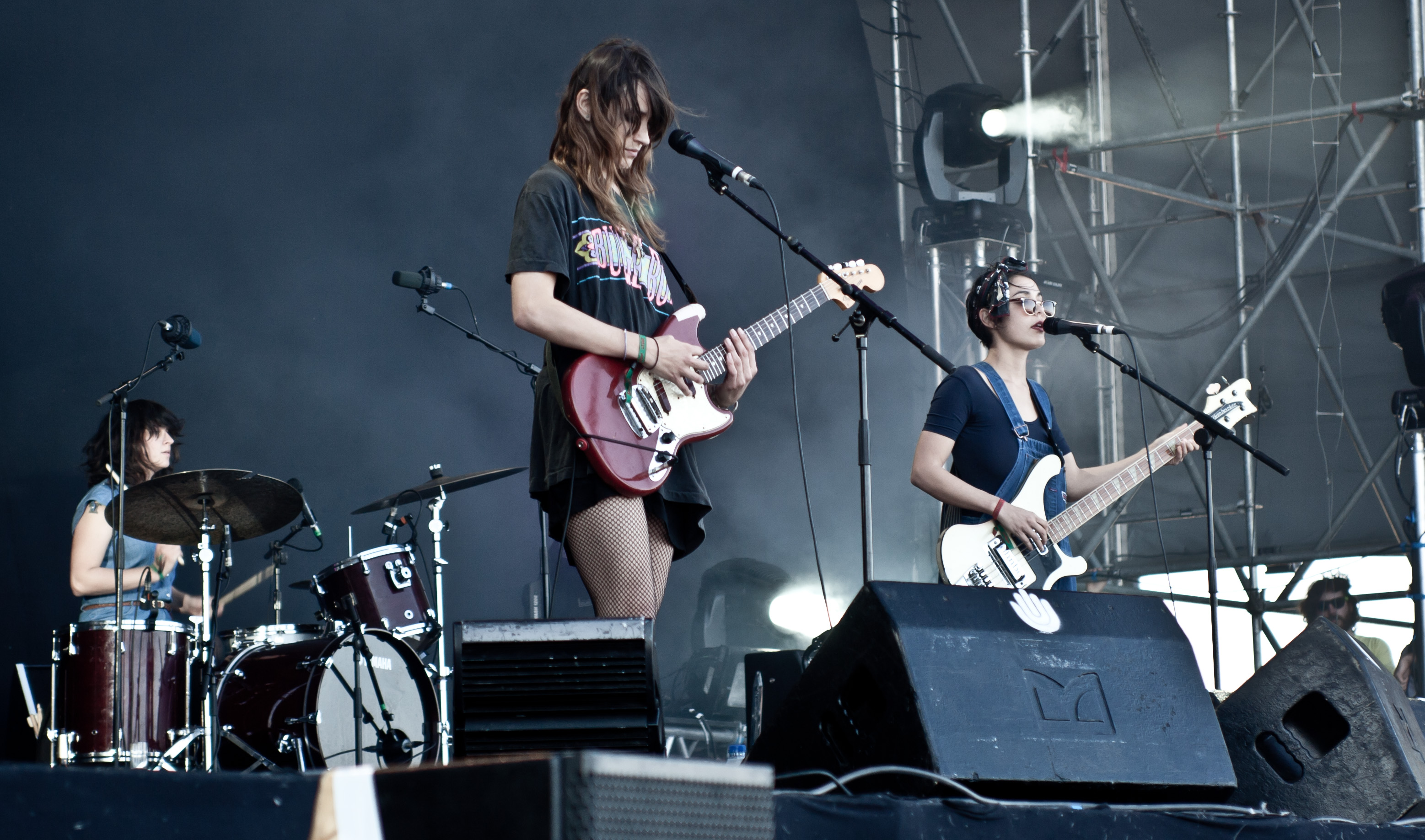
Mozgawa (left) performing with Warpaint

In Los Angeles, Mozgawa befriended Warpaint vocalist and guitarist Theresa Wayman in late 2009. She was subsequently invited to join the band and replaced Shannyn Sossamon. Mozgawa featured in the recording of the band's first album, The Fool (2010). In 2014, the band released its second studio album, Warpaint, with Mozgawa contributing fully to the songwriting process, followed by Heads Up in 2016 and Radiate Like This in 2022.

== Production ==
Mozgawa's production credits include Courtney Barnett ("Things Take Time, Take Time" (2021), End of the Day (2023) and Creature of Habit (2026), Cryogeyser ("Love Is Land" 2021), and Hot Wax ("Hot Shock" 2025). She produced the original soundtrack for two seasons of the Apple TV+ show The Buccaneers working with various artists including Sharon Van Etten, Gracie Abrams, Madi Diaz, Empress Of, Danielle Ponder, Emily Kokal, Warpaint and Alison Mosshart.

== Belief ==
In 2022, Mozgawa and producer Bryan Hollon released their first album Belief (2022) on Lex Records. The album came from many years of improvised electronic music performances.

Hollon told Talkhouse that the recording process was unusual for both of them, "really what we were inspired by was that kind of early '90s acid house scene, which a lot of times that was one or two people with a bunch of machines hooked into each other playing live, because there really wasn’t a good way to track things in that era separately"

On album track "Dreams" Mozgawa played live hi-hat, snare and percussion, over the programmed drum machines, On "Wot" Mozgawa played the main atonal synthline on an Oberheim synthesiser, then Hollon added further instrumentation.

Speaking to The Line of Best Fit, Hollon described the recording of album track "Ulu", "The pad loop was the foundation and the addition of the 303 bass line brought me back to an era of music we both love. Once the improvised tracks were laid down live, we went back and added a drum break played by Stella and I added a bass guitar."

== Remixes ==
Mozgawa has remixed several artists, including Daughter, Shura, Sarah Blasko, Jess Ribeiro, Ouch My Face, Eves the Behavior and Depeche Mode.

== Discography ==
with Warpaint

- The Fool (2010)
- Warpaint (2014)
- Heads Up (2016)
- Radiate Like This (2022)

with Belief

- Belief (2022)

=== with Courtney Barnett ===
- Things Take Time, Take Time
- End of the Day
- Creature of Habit

with Kurt Vile

- Wakin on a Pretty Daze (2013)
- It's a Big World Out There (And I Am Scared) (2013)
- B'lieve I'm Goin Down... (2015)
- Spotify Sessions (2015)
- Lotta Sea Lice (2017) (with Courtney Barnett)
- Bottle It In (2018)
- Watch My Moves (2022)
- Back to Moon Beach (2023)

Session appearances

- Helen Burns (2012) – Flea
- Spirit in the Room (2012) – Tom Jones
- Howlin' (2013) – Jagwar Ma
- There There (2014) – Megan Washington
- Wonder Where We Land (2014) – SBTRKT
- My Dreams Dictate My Reality (2015) – Soko
- Right On! (2015) – Jenny Lee Lindberg
- Crab Day (2016) – Cate Le Bon
- Furnaces (2016) – Ed Harcourt
- Aladdin (2016) – Adam Green
- Murdered Out (2016) – Kim Gordon
- The WiNK (2016) – Tim Presley
- Every Now and Then (2016) – Jagwar Ma
- Remember Us to Life (2016) – Regina Spektor
- The Good Book (2016) – Andy Clockwise
- Clashes (2016) – Monika Brodka
- I See You (2017) – The xx
- Young Adult (2017) – Rodes Rollins
- I Romanticize (2017) – H Hawkline
- LoveLaws (2018) – TT
- Record (2018) – Tracey Thorn
- Now! In A Minute (2018) – Audiobooks
- Remind Me Tomorrow (2019) – Sharon Van Etten
- Diviner (2019) - Hayden Thorpe
- Reward (2019) – Cate Le Bon
- Stranded (2021) – Flight Facilities
- Return to Center (2019) – Kirin J Callinan
- Myths 004 (2019) – Cate Le Bon and Bradford Cox
- Ceremony (2020) – Phantogram
- Fear Of Death (2021) – Tim Heidecker
- Boy from Michigan (2021) – John Grant
- Sixty Summers (2021) – Julia Stone
- Pompeii (2022) – Cate Le Bon
- Typical Love (single) (2022) – Cate Le Bon
- Follow The Cyborg (2019) – Miss Grit
- All Born Screaming (2024) - St. Vincent
- The Good Kind (2024) – Our Girl
- The Say They Love You (2024) – Luci
- Cascade (2024) – Floating Points
- Hot Shock (2025) – Hot Wax
- Escaper (2025) – Sarah Kinsley
- Secrets (2025) – Jordan Firstman
- Heart of Gold: The Songs of Neil Young (2025) – Various Artists
- Liquorice (2025) – Hatchie
- A Jackal's Wedding (2025) – Westerman

With Desert Sessions

- Volume 11: Arrivederci Despair (2019) – Desert Sessions
- Volume 12: Tightwads & Nitwits & Critics & Heels (2019) – Desert Sessions

== Awards and nominations ==
=== ARIA Music Awards ===
Year	Nominee / work	Award	Result	Ref.
2022	Courtney Barnett & Stella Mozgawa for Courtney Barnett – Things Take Time, Take Time	Producer – Best Produced Album	nominated; lost to Rüfüs Du Sol for Rüfüs Du Sol – Surrender	
