= Right On! (Jenny Lee Lindberg album) =

Studio album by Jennylee
- Released: December 11, 2015
- Recorded: 2015
- Studio: Happy Ending Studios in Los Angeles, California
- Genre: New wave
- Length: 37:25
- Label: Rough Trade
- Producer: Jenny Lee Lindberg; Norm Block

Right on! (stylized as right on!) is the debut studio album by the American indie rock musician Jenny Lee Lindberg, credited as "Jennylee". It was released worldwide on December 11, 2015, on Rough Trade Records.

== Recording ==
Right On! was recorded at Happy Ending Studios in Silver Lake, a neighborhood in Los Angeles, California, during spring 2015, with Lindberg and Norm Block heading production. Block was part of Lindberg's core band, which included Dan Elkan and fellow Warpaint member Stella Mozgawa. Photographs and video clips from the album's recording sessions were regularly shared by Lindberg on various social media sites, including Instagram and Facebook, during production.

== Composition ==
Right On! incorporates new wave and gothic rock elements alongside Lindberg's "signature Warpaint groove", according to the album's press release. The album features Lindberg's "breathy" vocals, which have been described as contributing to its overall "hazy and dreamy" sound.

== Release ==
Right On! was released worldwide on December 11, 2015, on Rough Trade Records, in LP, CD and digital download formats. Optional pre-ordered physical copies contained a limited-edition custom-designed patch and signed Polaroid photograph.

A one-minute teaser video, shot by Mia Kirby and Sierra Swan, was released on YouTube alongside Right On!'s announcement on September 15, 2015. Acting as the album's trailer, the video included clips of three album tracks: "Never", "Boom Boom" and "He Fresh".

== Reception ==
Professional ratings
Review scores
Source	Rating
Evening Standard	3/5 stars
Exclaim!	8/10
The Guardian	3/5 stars
NME	3/5 stars
Pitchfork	(7.3/10)

In a Pitchfork review, Jes Skolnik wrote that the record "owes quite a bit to '80s and '90s goth-leaning college rock but thankfully never feels like a direct tracing thereof". The Guardian critic Rachel Aroesti said that "lead single 'Never' pairs a 'Transmission'-esque bassline with wayward drums, while 'Blind' presents droning, dismantled blues and 'Offerings' sounds like the work of a goth-rock Orange Juice". Anna Alger of Exclaim! wrote that the record "cements [Lindberg's] place as an intuitive songwriter who knows how to craft complex, danceable songs as well as introspective, downtempo numbers." NME reviewer Barry Nicolson said that the record emphasizes "mood over melody" and suggests that "it's something of a grower, whose charms are revealed like arcane secrets only to those with patience, persistence and a lack of proximity to heavy machinery". Richard Godwin's Evening Standard review concluded that "the best of Right On! snaps along at a rapid pace, building from Peter Hook-esque bass figures played high up the fretboard and tumultuous drums ... mixed a little too low for floor-filling purposes but high enough to create an anxious, addictive groove".

== Tour ==
In support of Right On! Lindberg performed an "early preview" of the album at Baby's All Right in Brooklyn, New York on November 4, 2015, followed by a tour of the United Kingdom.

== Track listing ==
All songs written and composed by Jenny Lee Lindberg.

1. "Blind" – 4:11
2. "Boom Boom" – 3:52
3. "Never" – 2:48
4. "Long Lonely Winter" – 4:17
5. "Bully" – 3:53
6. "Riot" – 3:05
7. "He Fresh" – 3:57
8. "Offerings" – 3:56
9. "White Devil" – 3:25
10. "Real Life" – 4:01

== Personnel ==
All personnel credits adapted from Right On!'s liner notes

Performers

- Jenny Lee Lindberg – lead vocals, bass guitar (tracks 1–9), guitar (tracks 3–5, and 7–9), keyboards (track 4)
- Norm Block – drums (tracks 2–5, and 9), backing vocals (track 2)
- Dan Elkan – guitar (tracks 2, 4–6, and 9), backing vocals (tracks 2, 4, and 8)
- Stella Mozgawa – drums (track 6), beat (track 7)

Additional performers

- Tony Bevilacqua – guitar (track 2)
- Kris Byerly – backing vocals (track 9)
- Katie Burden – backing vocals (track 8)
- Kirk Hellie – guitar (tracks 1 and 9)
- Jonathan Hishcke – bass guitar (tracks 4 and 7)
- Cedric LeMoyne – guitar (track 10)

Production

- Jenny Lee Lindberg – production, artwork
- Norm Block – production, engineering, mixing
- Paul Logus – mastering
- Mia Kirby – artwork, photography
