= Warpaint (Warpaint album) =

Studio album by Warpaint
- Released: January 17, 2014
- Studio: Fivestar, Los Angeles, California, US; Assault & Battery, London, UK
- Genre: Indie rock, art rock, dream pop
- Length: 51:16
- Label: Rough Trade
- Producer: Flood, Warpaint

Warpaint chronology
The Fool (2010)	Warpaint (2014)	Heads Up (2016)

Singles from Warpaint
- 1. "Love Is to Die" Released: October 28, 2013

Warpaint is the second studio album by the American indie rock band Warpaint, released on January 17, 2014 on Rough Trade Records. Produced by Flood and the band itself, the album was preceded by the single, "Love Is to Die". It has been characterized as dream pop.

== Composition ==
In an interview with NME in September 2011, drummer Stella Mozgawa affirmed that Warpaint planned to "experiment and write with one another" to develop the songs on Warpaint as their current lineup had never composed songs "from the ground up" together. Bassist Jenny Lee Lindberg elaborated on the composition of new material, explaining most songs were written by "just jam[ming] and free-flow[ing] onstage". Guitarist Theresa Wayman confirmed that the band intended to create a minimalist sound on Warpaint, revealing that the band developed songs at soundchecks, and experimented more with acoustic guitars and percussion instruments on the album. Lead vocalist Emily Kokal noted that R&B and rap music was an influence on Warpaint and stated that on the album there are "things that have drum machines and ambience, music that's more than standard rock." Kokal added that the album is largely keyboards-based, which contributed to the overall sound being "definitely different" from the band's previous album The Fool (2010).

== Release ==
Warpaint was released in Germany, Ireland, Netherlands and Switzerland on January 17, 2014; January 20 in Denmark, France, Sweden and the United Kingdom; and January 21 in Spain and the United States on Rough Trade. It was released in Japan on January 22 on Hostess Entertainment, with two bonus tracks featured on the CD release. Warpaint was released on a number of formats, including CD, colored double LP and as a digital download. Autographed posters and stencils were issued free with the first 1,000 LP and CD pre-orders from the band's online store.

A snippet of the album's lead single, "Love Is to Die", was featured in an advertisement for Calvin Klein on September 25, 2013 and later as part of a teaser for an upcoming documentary of the same name about the recording of Warpaint. The single was released on October 28 with pre-ordered digital versions of the album. The song was also featured on a season 7 episode, also named "Love Is to Die", of HBO series True Blood, which aired on August 17, 2014.

In 2014, it was awarded a double silver certification from the Independent Music Companies Association, which indicated sales of at least 40,000 copies throughout Europe.

== Tour ==
In support of the album, Warpaint commenced a 23-date, three-leg international tour. The first leg, a European tour, began on October 28, 2013 at O_{2} ABC in Glasgow, Scotland and concluded on November 16 at the Crossing Border Festival in The Hague, Netherlands. A five-date set of performances at Laneway Festival in Australia began on January 31, 2014 and concluded on February 8, with Warpaint performing in various cities including Brisbane, Melbourne, Adelaide and Fremantle. The third and final leg began on February 19 at the O_{2} Academy in Leeds, England and concluded on March 1 at Aula Magna in Lisbon, Portugal. During the tour preceding Warpaint's release, the band debuted several of the album's songs, including "Keep It Healthy", "Hi" and "Love Is to Die".

== Reception ==
Professional ratings
Aggregate scores
Source	Rating
AnyDecentMusic?	7.2/10
Metacritic	74/100
Review scores
Source	Rating
AllMusic	4/5 stars
The A.V. Club	B
Chicago Tribune	3.5/4 stars
The Guardian	3/5 stars
The Independent	4/5 stars
NME	9/10
Pitchfork	5.7/10
Q	4/5 stars
Rolling Stone	3.5/5 stars
Spin	7/10

Upon its release, Warpaint received generally positive reviews. At Metacritic, which assigns a normalized rating out of 100 to reviews from mainstream critics, the album received an average score of 74, based on 40 reviews, indicating "generally favorable reviews". Alternative Press reviewer Brian Shultz stated that "Warpaint still yields an enjoyable, haunting outpouring of whispered emotional damage and spatial exploration". Writing for Clash, Daisy Jones referred to the album as "devastatingly brooding as ever", noting that "Warpaint have always managed to make music to totally submerge yourself in, like an oil painting mixed with blood, and this album is no exception". Jazz Monroe of Drowned in Sound called the material "virtuosic and exquisite" while describing the lyrical content as "romantic but unglamorous … [and the band] take their time to reflect love's ambiguity". Monroe summarized: "While a gentler, more complex thing, [Warpaint] leans hard on atmosphere and collapses, elegantly". The Quietus writer Mof Gimmers referred to Warpaint as "a record spun with a rich synthetic ambience, resulting in a curious mixture of the pleasant and uneasy" and said that the songs "exude an intense, intoxicated arousal, with lip-fattening blood rushes, grotty cinematic witching-hour horniness and David Lynchian daydream fucks" in his positive review. AllMusic writer Heather Phares wrote that there was a "undeniably darker cast" to the album's songs in contrast to the band's previous releases. Referring to Warpaint as "expansive and envelopin", Phares selected "Love Is to Die", "Teese" and "Feeling Alright" as highlights of the album. In her review for NME, Eve Barlow noted that "if The Fool presented them as ethereal hippies with musical nous, Warpaint drives them forward as masters of their talent", describing the material as having a "crisper, more direct sound."

In DIY's review of Warpaint, El Hunt stated that "The Fool was wonderfully muddied and submerged, while Warpaint zooms for the stratosphere", further praising Flood's production on the album as well as referring to Warpaint's "subtle handle of tone" as "magical." Writing for FACT, John Cavert considered Warpaint as "richer in atmosphere, sharper [and] artistically decisive" than the band's debut album and drew comparisons between Warpaint's material and Radiohead's Kid A (2000), The Raincoats and Delta 5. In his review for The Guardian, Alexis Petridis was initially critical, saying that Warpaint had an "overall atmosphere so subdued it makes Love Is to Die sound like the Vengaboys' cover of 'Hot Hot Hot'". He later stated that "patience and time reveal that to be a false first impression, at least in part" and summarized that "there's something impressively brave about releasing an album that demands time and concentration … Warpaint slowly pulls you into its own, quietly captivating world". Chase Woodruff of Slant Magazine commended its "complex, operatic highs" and "subdued, ethereal sound" but concluded that "its experiments in minimalism and tranquility make for some awfully low lows".

== Track listing ==
All tracks are written by Warpaint.

No.	Title	Length
1.	"Intro"	1:51
2.	"Keep It Healthy"	4:02
3.	"Love Is to Die"	4:52
4.	"Hi"	5:11
5.	"Biggy"	5:55
6.	"Teese"	4:42
7.	"Disco//Very"	4:04
8.	"Go In"	4:00
9.	"Feeling Alright"	3:33
10.	"CC"	3:48
11.	"Drive"	5:12
12.	"Son"	4:07
Total length:		51:16

Japanese CD edition bonus tracks
No.	Title	Length
13.	"Love Is to Die" (Extended alternate mix)	5:38
14.	"Love Is to Die" (The Line of Best Fit live session)	5:12
Total length:		62:06

== Personnel ==
All personnel credits adapted from Warpaint's album notes.

Warpaint

- Emily Kokal – guitar, vocals (2, 3, 5–8, 11)
- Jenny Lee Lindberg – bass, vocals (7, 11)
- Stella Mozgawa – drums
- Theresa Wayman – guitar, keyboards, vocals (2–4, 6–9, 12)

Technical personnel

- John Catlin – mixing
- Cecil – recording, mixing
- Flood – production, recording, mixing
- Nigel Godrich – mixing (3, 9)
- Stephen Marcussen – mastering
- Sam Petts-Davies – mixing assistant (3, 9)
- Drew Smith – recording
- Justin Smith – recording
- Warpaint – production, recording, mixing

Design personnel

- Chris Cunningham – photography, artwork
- Ravi Dhar – additional photography
- Mia Kirby – additional photography, artwork

== Chart positions ==
Chart (2014)	Peak position
Australian Albums Chart	35
Austrian Albums Chart	28
Belgian Albums Chart (Flanders)	19
Belgian Albums Chart (Wallonia)	47
Dutch Albums Chart	40
French Albums Chart	95
German Albums Chart	13
Irish Albums Chart	34
Irish Independent Albums Chart	3
Japanese Albums Chart	163
New Zealand Albums Chart	32
Portuguese Albums Chart	17
Swiss Albums Chart	11
UK Albums Chart	9
UK Independent Albums Chart	2
U.S. Billboard 200	43
U.S. Billboard Alternative Albums	10
U.S. Billboard Independent Albums	7
U.S. Billboard Rock Albums	13
U.S. Billboard Tastemaker Albums	5

== Release history ==
Region	Date	Format	Label	Catalog
Germany	January 17, 2014	2×LP, CD, digital download	Rough Trade	RTRAD689
Ireland	January 17, 2014	2×LP, CD, digital download	Rough Trade	RTRAD689
Netherlands	January 17, 2014	2×LP, CD, digital download	Rough Trade	RTRAD689
Switzerland	January 17, 2014	2×LP, CD, digital download	Rough Trade	RTRAD689
Denmark	January 20, 2014	2×LP, CD, digital download	Rough Trade	RTRAD689
France	January 20, 2014	2×LP, CD, digital download	Rough Trade	RTRAD689
Sweden	January 20, 2014	2×LP, CD, digital download	Rough Trade	RTRAD689
United Kingdom	January 20, 2014	2×LP, CD, digital download	Rough Trade	RTRAD689
Spain	January 21, 2014	2×LP, CD, digital download	Rough Trade	RTRAD689
United States	January 21, 2014	2×LP, CD, digital download	Rough Trade	RTRAD689
Japan	January 22, 2014	2×LP, CD, digital download	Hostess Entertainment	BGJ-10189
