= The Fool (Warpaint album) =

Studio album by Warpaint
- Released: October 25, 2010
- Recorded: 2010 at Curves Studio and The Boat Studio in Los Angeles, California
- Genre: Art rock; desert rock; psychedelic rock; slowcore
- Length: 46:49
- Label: Rough Trade
- Producer: Tom Biller

Warpaint chronology
Exquisite Corpse (2008)	The Fool (2010)	Warpaint (2014)

Singles from The Fool
- 1. "Undertow" Released: September 21, 2010; 2. "Shadows" Released: January 10, 2011

The Fool is the debut studio album by American alternative rock band Warpaint, released on October 25, 2010, on Rough Trade Records. The album was recorded at two studios—Curves Studio and The Boat Studio—in the band's native Los Angeles, California, throughout 2010 and was produced by Tom Biller, who also shared mixing duties with Andrew Weatherall and Adam Samuels.

The band describe the album as the "older sister" of their debut, Exquisite Corpse (2008).

== Release ==
The Fool was released on October 25, 2010, in the United Kingdom and the following day in the United States. The album was previewed before its physical release through an exclusive stream on The Hype Machine on October 18. The album was promoted by two singles—"Undertow" and "Shadows"—released on September 21, 2010 and January 10, 2011, respectively. Both singles received moderate acclaim, though did not chart. In March 2011, "Undertow" and the Neon Lights remix of "Shadows", featured as the single's B-side, were featured on a playlist by BBC Radio 1 as part of the In New Music We Trust and "Undertow" was exclusively re-released in April 2011 as part of the international Record Store Day. On September 26, 2011, less than a year after its original release, a deluxe edition of The Fool was released, featuring two bonus tracks and a second disc with Exquisite Corpse.

In 2011, The Fool was awarded a silver certification from the Independent Music Companies Association, which indicated sales of at least 20,000 copies throughout Europe.

A previously unheard alternate version of The Fool mixed entirely by Andrew Weatherall – as opposed to just two songs mixed by Weatherall on the original album – along with a different tracklisting envisaged by Weatherall, was released on vinyl for Record Store Day on June 12, 2021. The Weatherall mix also included "Jubilee", a previously unreleased track that was recorded for and subsequently left off The Fool, with plans to release it as a stand-alone single in 2011 that ultimately also fell through.

=== Tour ===
Upon its release, Warpaint embarked on a tour of Europe to promote The Fool. The 21-date tour lasted from October 21 to November 15, 2010, and the band performed in Ireland, the United Kingdom, Belgium, Germany, Denmark, France and the Netherlands. Following the tour, the band also performed seven shows throughout the United States, beginning in St. Louis, Missouri on November 19 and concluding in Los Angeles, California on December 12. On January 31, 2011, the band began a third leg of the tour in Australia and New Zealand, lasting until February 12. On February 21, the band performed a one-off show with Twin Shadow at O2 Shepherd's Bush Empire in London as part of the NME's award shows and in March and April, the band began another leg throughout the United States, beginning in San Francisco, California on March 16 and concluding in Indio, California on April 15. They also played at various major festivals including Bonnaroo, Glastonbury Festival, Reading and Leeds Festivals, Coachella Valley Music and Arts Festival, Rock Werchter and Electric Picnic in support of the album.

== Composition ==
On The Fool, Warpaint tap into a "sultry" desert rock language, speaking to the style's mysticism. They also work in "complicated and intricate" art rock, psychedelic rock, and slowcore styles.

== Reception ==
Professional ratings
Aggregate scores
Source	Rating
AnyDecentMusic?	7.7/10
Metacritic	77/100
Review scores
Source	Rating
AllMusic	3/5 stars
The A.V. Club	B+
Financial Times	4/5 stars
The Guardian	4/5 stars
Mojo	4/5 stars
NME	9/10
Pitchfork	7.2/10
Q	4/5 stars
Rolling Stone	3.5/5 stars
Spin	8/10

Upon its release, The Fool received critical acclaim. At Metacritic, which assigns a normalized rating out of 100 to reviews from mainstream critics, the album received an average score of 77, based on 33 reviews, indicating "generally favorable reviews". AllMusic's Heather Phares said that "The Fool has flashes of brilliance" and "darkly feminine songs with instinctive structures". Jason Heller of The A.V. Club noted the album "coasts instead on a humid, hazy, oozing pulse that's less ice age and more malarial swamp" and "with a torpid and feverish dreaminess". Writing for Consequence of Sound, Philip Cosores called it "a genre record for a genre that doesn't exist" and admired the album's production, stating "though the guitar leads sound unpolished, the vocals sound untrained, and the bass can overwhelm the songs, the lack of perfection makes more of a statement than all the auto-tune in the world." Andrzej Lukowski, in his review in Drowned in Sound, said "there is an incredible level of detail and accomplishment to The Fool" and Jenny Mulligan of Entertainment.ie described the "haunting atmosphere" of the album as "wholly intoxicating".

Filter reviewer Laura Jespersen described The Fool as "uncomplicated, psychedelic indie-girl rock with plenty of hazy guitar and a swooning, restrained sadness"; Hot Press also described it as "psych-rock". In The Guardian, Maddy Costa noted "it's the consistent sensuality of Warpaint's sound that makes them mesmerise." NME's Laura Snapes wrote "the dark purple rumble and hypnotic coo of their vocals swim along, dragging the listener beneath its beguiling surface into a swathe of subtle time changes and guitar prone to sudden swan dives into heart-stabbing gold arcs from oil painting-thick landscapes." Pitchfork writer Ryan Dombal referred to The Fool as "a nine-song seance of an album that's as subtle as it is disquieting" in his review and Chris Martins of Spin summarized that "The Fool is built on Joy Division's post-punk low end, moody chords, droning vocals, and doomy lyrics, but it's more than a tribute."

== Track listing ==
All tracks are written by Warpaint.

No.	Title	Length
1.	"Set Your Arms Down"	5:01
2.	"Warpaint"	5:51
3.	"Undertow"	5:53
4.	"Bees"	4:22
5.	"Shadows"	4:04
6.	"Composure"	4:55
7.	"Baby"	5:00
8.	"Majesty"	6:32
9.	"Lissie's Heart Murmur"	5:11
Total length:		46:49

Deluxe edition
No.	Title	Length
10.	"Shadows" (Neon Lights remix)	3:19
Total length:		50:08

Deluxe edition Exquisite Corpse bonus disc
No.	Title	Length
1.	"Stars"	6:27
2.	"Elephants"	4:45
3.	"Billie Holiday"	6:45
4.	"Beetles"	6:58
5.	"Burgundy"	4:41
6.	"Krimson"	4:08
7.	"Billie Holiday" (Steve Mackey Radio Mix)	3:39
Total length:		37:23

Andrew Weatherall Mix
No.	Title	Length
1.	"Warpaint"	5:38
2.	"Undertow"	5:50
3.	"Bees"	4:22
4.	"Jubilee"	6:17
5.	"Shadows"	4:04
6.	"Majesty"	6:32
7.	"Baby"	5:00
8.	"Composure"	4:55
9.	"Lissie's Heart Murmur"	5:11
10.	"Set Your Arms Down"	4:59
Total length:		52:51

== Personnel ==
All personnel credits adapted from The Fool's album notes.

Warpaint

- Emily Kokal – vocals (1–3, 6, 7, 9), backing vocals, guitar
- Jenny Lee Lindberg – bass, backing vocals
- Stella Mozgawa – drums, keyboards, guitar (1)
- Theresa Wayman – vocals (3–5, 8), backing vocals, guitar, keyboards (9), drums (1)

Technical personnel

- Tom Biller – production, recording, mixing (5)
- Sonny DiPerri – assistant engineer
- Sheldon Gomberg – mixing assistant (1, 2, 4, 6, 8, 9)
- Adam Samuels – mixing (1, 2, 4, 6, 8, 9)
- Nina Walsh – engineering
- Andrew Weatherall – mixing (3, 7)

Design personnel

- Mia Kirby – photography
- Takayuki Okada – photography
- Pierre Ziegler – artwork

== Chart positions ==
Chart (2010)	Peak position
Irish Albums Chart	75
Irish Independent Albums Chart	8
UK Albums Chart	41
UK Independent Albums Chart	3
UK Independent Albums Breakers Chart	1
US Billboard 200	176
US Heatseekers Albums (Billboard)	4
US Independent Albums (Billboard)	26
US Tastemakers Albums (Billboard)	19

=== Singles ===
Year	Single	Peak positions	
Year	Single	UK Indie	UK Indie Breakers
2010	"Undertow"	30	10

== Certifications ==
Region	Certification	Certified units/sales
United Kingdom (BPI)	Silver	60,000^{‡}
^{‡} Sales+streaming figures based on certification alone.
