= New Song (Warpaint song) =

Single by Warpaint

Single by Warpaint

from the album Heads Up
- Released: August 1, 2016
- Genre: Indie rock, disco
- Length: 4:16
- Label: Rough Trade
- Songwriter(s): Warpaint

"New Song" is a song by the American indie rock band Warpaint. It is the third track and lead single from the band's third studio album Heads Up, and was released on August 1, 2016 on Rough Trade Records.

== Release and promotion ==
The single has been remixed by the band Soulwax and Mike D of the Beastie Boys.

The band performed the song on The Tonight Show Starring Jimmy Fallon.

On December 9, 2016, Warpaint released a video for "New Song" on YouTube.

== Reception ==
"New Song" was generally well received by critics, but noted for being different from Warpaint's past material. NME described the single as "the poppiest thing [Warpaint has] ever done and probably the catchiest too". The Los Angeles Times called the single a "striking departure" from the band's previous work, but stated the song had "easy-to-memorize lyrics and a happy earworm of a melody". The Guardian called the song a "disco charmer". "New Song" was the band's first single to chart on the Billboard Alternative Songs and Adult Alternative Songs charts, where it peaked at numbers 32 and 14 respectively.
