= Jenny Lee Lindberg =

American musician (born 1981)

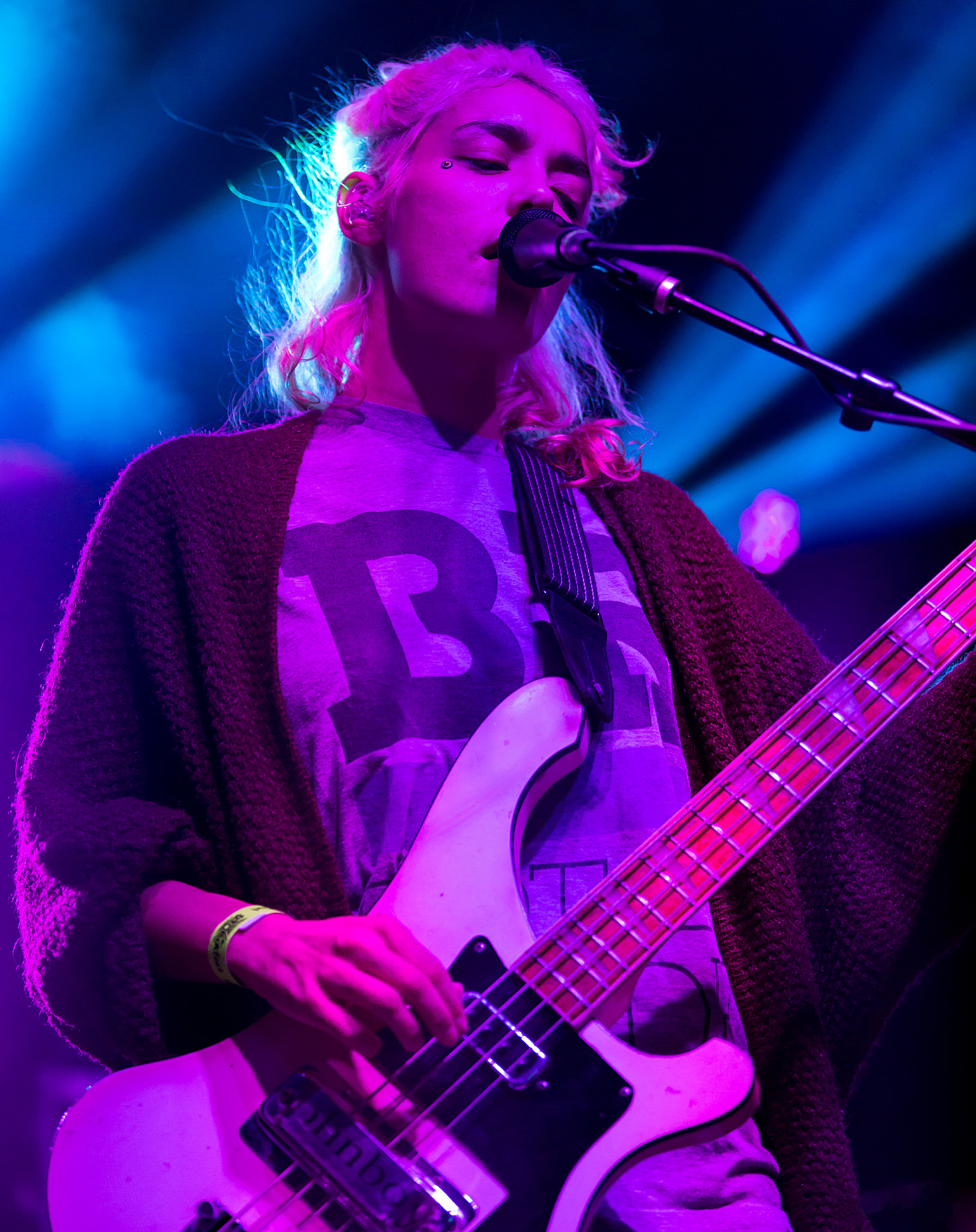
- Lindberg performing at Utopiafest in 2014

Background information
- Also known as: Jennylee
- Born: Jennifer Lee Lindberg; July 30, 1981 (age 45); Elko, Nevada, U.S.
- Origin: Los Angeles, California
- Genres: Indie rock; art rock; dream pop; new wave
- Occupations: Musician; singer-songwriter; record producer; painter
- Instruments: Bass; vocals
- Years active: 2004–present
- Labels: Manimal; Rough Trade
- Member of: Warpaint
- Website: jennyleelindberg.com www.jennylibrary.com
- Relatives: Shannyn Sossamon (sister)

Jennifer Lee Lindberg (born July 30, 1981) is an American musician, singer-songwriter, record producer and painter, best known as the bassist of the indie rock band Warpaint. In 2015, Lindberg released her first solo album, Right On!, under the name "Jennylee".

== Career ==
=== Warpaint ===
Lindberg formed Warpaint with Emily Kokal, Theresa Wayman and Lindberg's sister Shannyn Sossamon on Valentine's Day 2004. After rehearsing and composing original material alone for 18 months, Warpaint began performing regularly in Los Angeles and self-released their debut extended play, Exquisite Corpse, in August 2008.

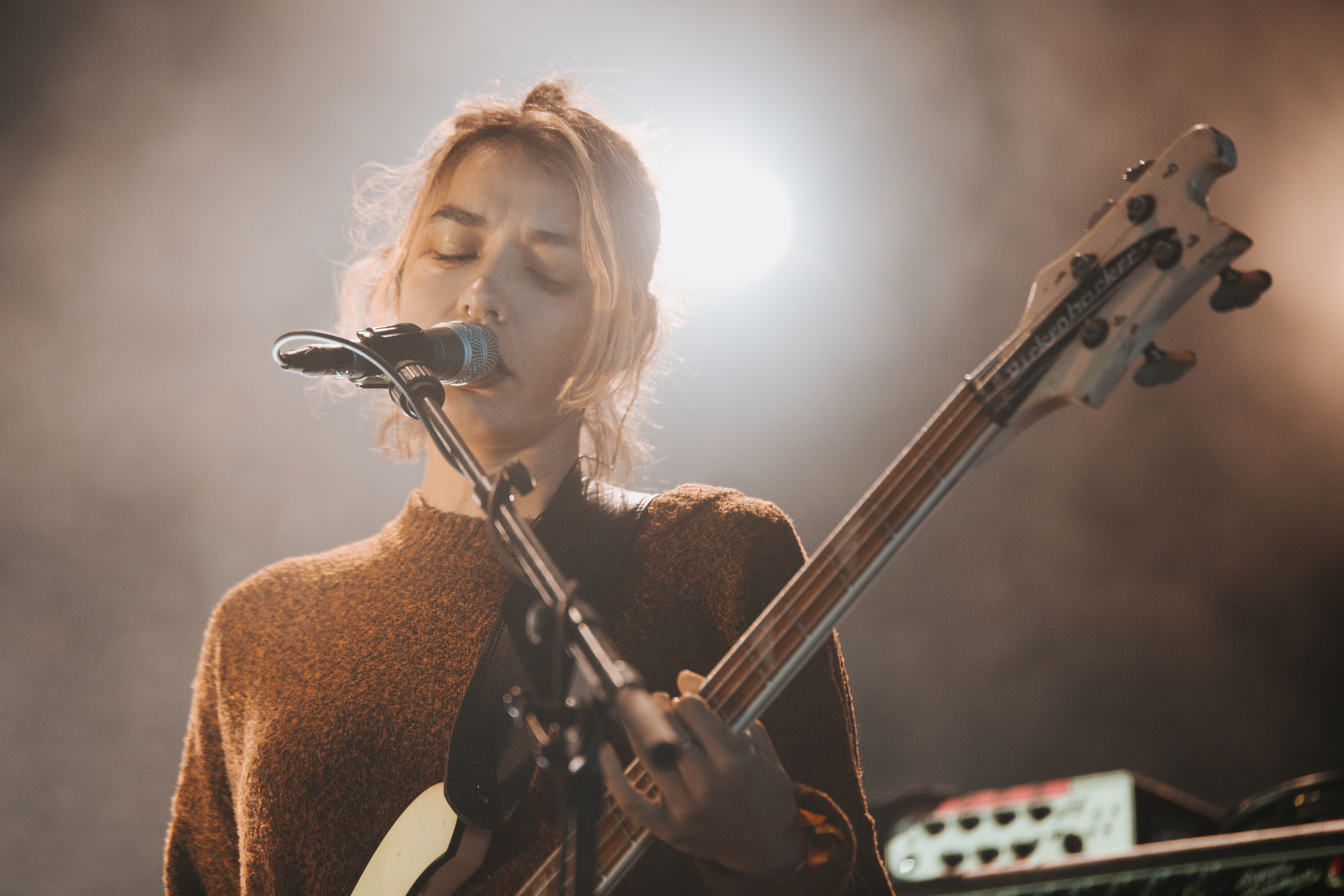
Lindberg performing with Warpaint in 2017

Warpaint's debut studio album, The Fool, was released in October 2010 on Rough Trade Records following a number of lineup changes, including the recruitment of drummer Stella Mozgawa. The album was well received by critics and peaked at No. 176 on the Billboard 200. The band's second eponymous studio album was released in January 2014, and featured Lindberg performing vocals on two tracks: "Disco//very" and "CC". Receiving favorable reviews and charting in several countries, Warpaint reached the top 10 on the UK Albums Chart, Irish Independent Albums Chart, and Billboard's Alternative, Independent and Tastemaker album charts.

=== Right On! ===
Lindberg's debut solo studio album, Right On!, was released on December 11, 2015, on Rough Trade; she was credited as "Jennylee". Featuring elements of new wave and gothic rock, the album was produced by Lindberg with Norm Block and featured Warpaint's Mozgawa on drums.

=== Collaborations ===
Lindberg has collaborated with other musicians during her career. In 2009, she played bass on Brian Blade's Mama Rosa (2009). She later played bass on "Goodbye Lovers & Friends", a song from Boom Bip's Zig Zaj (2011), and "The Madness of Clouds", a song from Viv Albertine's The Vermilion Border (2013). Lindberg worked with Jimmy Giannopoulos of Lolawolf on the project CRW$HD. In 2020 she played bass on Phoebe Bridgers's album Punisher. In 2021 as part of her 'Singles Club' project, Lindberg collaborated with Depeche Mode frontman Dave Gahan on the single "Stop Speaking".

== Influences ==
When she was young, Lindberg listened to Tears for Fears, which influenced her later music. She has also cited among her influences Jah Wobble's bass playing with PiL in her "list of all-time greats". She named Siouxsie Sioux of Siouxsie and the Banshees as one of her favorite voices of all time, saying, "I have a lot of respect for Siouxsie and she's given me a lot of inspiration over the years". Sylvester, Carly Simon, Art of Noise, Kraftwerk, Aphex Twin and Depeche Mode were other acts that inspired her.

== Personal life ==
Lindberg was born on July 30, 1981, in Elko, Nevada. She is the daughter of Sherry Sossamon, a nurse, and Todd Lindberg. She is the sister of actress and musician Shannyn Sossamon. Following their parents' divorce when Lindberg was two, she and her sister were raised by their mother, who remarried to Randy Goldman. Her maternal grandmother is of Hawaiian and Filipino descent, while the rest of her ancestry is Dutch, English, German, French and Irish. Raised in Reno, Nevada, Lindberg relocated to Los Angeles, California as an adult.

She was formerly married to Chris Cunningham. They divorced in 2016.

== Discography ==
Solo

- Right On! (2015)
- Heart Tax (2022)

With Warpaint

- Exquisite Corpse EP (2008)
- The Fool (2010)
- Warpaint (2014)
- Heads Up (2016)
- Radiate Like This (2022)

Guest appearances

- Brian Blade – Mama Rosa (2009)
- Boom Bip – "Goodbye Lovers & Friends" on Zig Zaj (2011)
- Viv Albertine – "The Madness of Clouds" on The Vermilion Border (2012)
- TT (Theresa Wayman) – "Take One" on LoveLaws (2018)
