= Theresa Wayman =

American musician (born 1980)

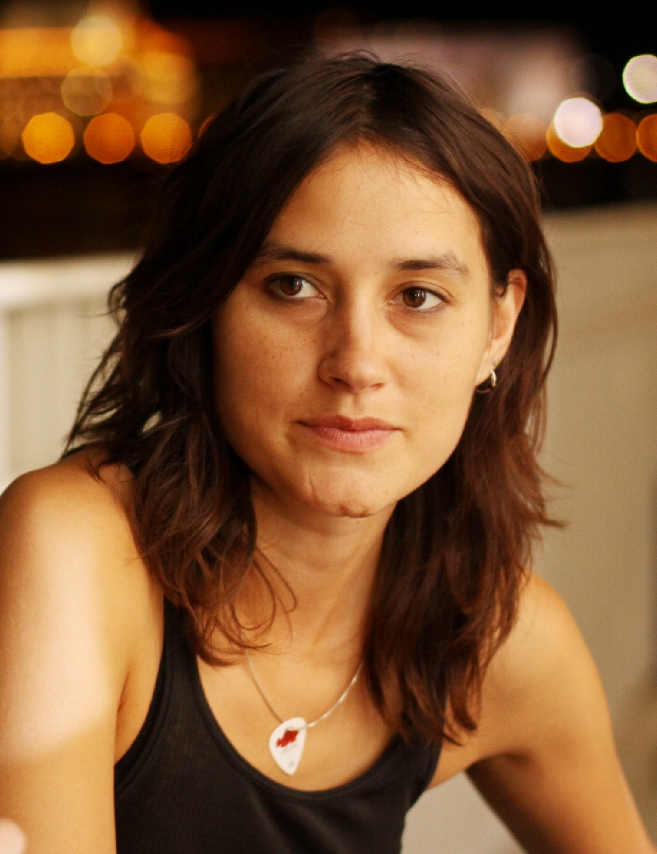
- Wayman in 2012

Background information
- Also known as: TT
- Born: Theresa Becker Wayman; June 23, 1980 (age 46); Eugene, Oregon, U.S.
- Origin: Los Angeles, California, U.S.
- Genres: Indie rock; art rock; dream pop
- Occupations: Musician; singer-songwriter; actress
- Instruments: Vocals; guitar; piano; keyboards; drums; bass
- Years active: 2004–present
- Labels: Manimal; Rough Trade
- Member of: Warpaint

Theresa Becker Wayman (born June 23, 1980), known professionally as TT, is an American musician, singer-songwriter, and occasional actress, best known as guitarist and vocalist of the indie rock band Warpaint.

== Early life ==
Wayman was born and raised in Eugene, Oregon. She became interested in music at age 9, when she started "jamming along with [her] dad" on guitar. At age 10, her mother encouraged her to learn piano. Wayman has said that she "dabbled in guitar as a teen; then got really serious about guitar and drums when [she] was about 21".

During her adolescence, Wayman became close friends with Emily Kokal, with whom she would later form Warpaint. Both traveled through Europe together in their late teenage years and lived together in New York City and Los Angeles.

== Career ==
=== Music ===
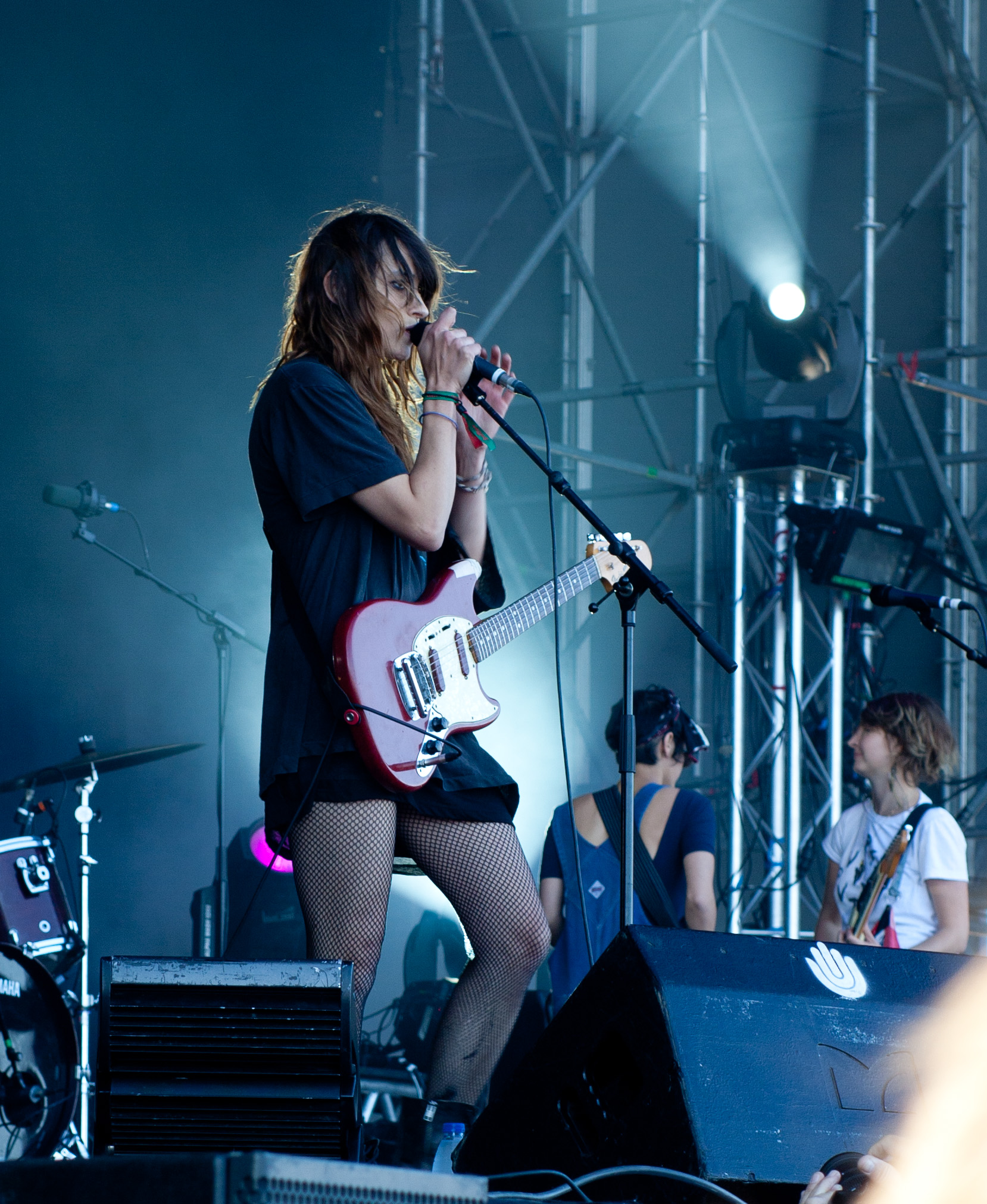
Wayman performing at Primavera Sound in 2011

After relocating to Los Angeles, Wayman formed Warpaint on Valentine's Day 2004 with Kokal and sisters Jenny Lee Lindberg and Shannyn Sossamon. The band spent four years performing around Los Angeles and composing original material before self-releasing its debut EP, Exquisite Corpse, in August 2008. Following a number of lineup changes in 2009—which included Wayman recruiting drummer Stella Mozgawa—Warpaint released its debut studio album, The Fool, in October 2010 on Rough Trade Records. The album was well received by critics, peaked at No. 176 on the Billboard 200, and charted in the United Kingdom and Ireland.

Wayman also had "a brief spell" as a member of Vincent Gallo's backing band in 2005. Describing the experience, she said, "I was really, really bummed when Warpaint split up, and was really grateful to be able to keep playing. He and I were going to continue playing, but then Warpaint got back together, and I had to go with that. Because Warpaint is my heart and soul".

Wayman formed a group, BOSS, with Sarah Jones of Hot Chip and Guro Gikling of All We Are. The trio's first single, "I'm Down With That", was released by Speedy Wunderground on November 27, 2015.

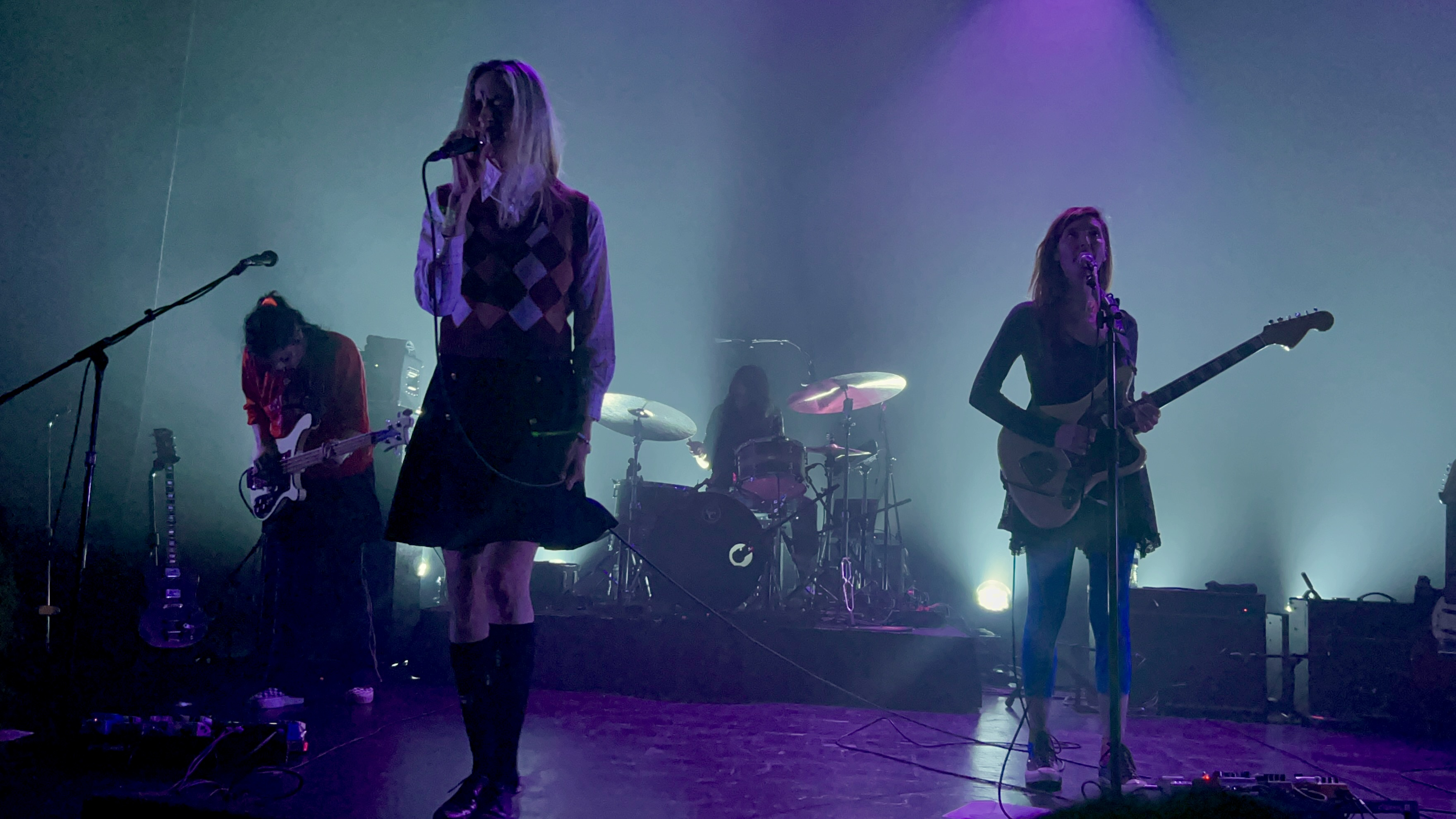
Theresa Wayman (center) performing with Warpaint in 2024

On March 6, 2018, under the name TT, Wayman released the first single, "Love Leaks", from her debut solo record, LoveLaws. The album was released on May 18, 2018, through her own LoveLeaks label and distributed by Caroline International. As a guitarist, Wayman is known to play a Fender Mustang.

=== Acting ===
Wayman occasionally works as an actress, and has appeared in two feature films and two short films. In 2002, she appeared in a minor role as a food service girl in The Rules of Attraction, alongside later bandmate Sossamon. She later portrayed J.T. in Rift, a 2004 short film by Sam Goldberg, and Ada in Burke Roberts' 2006 short film Insult to Injury. In 2010, Wayman played a supporting role in Pete Smalls Is Dead, portraying Saskia, "a laconic femme fatale".

In 2021 it was announced she will play the role of Ruth in the feature film adaptation of Kenneth J. Harvey's award-winning novel, Inside.

== Influences ==
Wayman's musical influences from her childhood and adolescence include Talking Heads, Cyndi Lauper, Tina Turner, Jimmy Page and Björk.

== Personal life ==
Wayman was previously in a relationship with British musician James Blake.

Wayman has one son, who was born in 2005. She has said that since becoming a mother, she is "more inspired, and my life is more rich in a certain sense. Because you see the value of human life, and just how fast time moves along. All of a sudden your son is five years old, and you see just how much has happened in that time. It's a good perspective".

== Discography ==
=== With Warpaint ===
- Exquisite Corpse EP (2008)
- The Fool (2010)
- Warpaint (2014)
- Heads Up (2016)
- Radiate Like This (2022)

=== Solo as TT ===
- LoveLaws (2018)
