= Exquisite Corpse (EP) =

EP by Warpaint
- Released: August 2008
- Recorded: 2007
- Genre: Experimental rock, art rock
- Length: 33:32
- Label: Manimal Vinyl
- Producer: Jacob Bercovici

Warpaint chronology
Exquisite Corpse (2008)	The Fool (2010)

Professional ratings
Review scores
Source	Rating
Las Vegas Critics	(8.4/10)

Exquisite Corpse is the debut EP by American alternative rock band Warpaint, self-released in August 2008 and subsequently re-released on October 6, 2009 on Manimal Vinyl.

== Background and release ==
Recorded in 2007, the EP was mixed by current-Red Hot Chili Peppers guitarist John Frusciante, and features Red Hot Chili Peppers ex-guitarist Josh Klinghoffer performing drums on "Billie Holiday" and guitar on "Krimson".

Promotional music videos were produced for the tracks "Stars", "Elephants" and "Beetles".

Several of the songs on Exquisite Corpse predated the EP, with some written up to five years earlier. Warpaint was initially formed in February 2004.

== Reception ==
BBC Music positively reviewed the EP, especially "Billie Holiday", comparing Warpaint favorably to the British band The xx. Sputnikmusic gave the album 3/5 stars, calling the record a "very accomplished" yet "unstructured" debut effort.

== Track listing ==
All songs written by Warpaint. "Billie Holiday" contains a portion of the song "My Guy", written by Smokey Robinson.

All tracks are written by Warpaint.

No.	Title	Length
1.	"Stars"	6:25
2.	"Elephants"	4:44
3.	"Billie Holiday"	6:44
4.	"Beetles"	6:57
5.	"Burgundy"	4:40
6.	"Krimson"	4:02
Total length:		33:32

== Charts ==
Chart (2011)	Peak position
UK Physical Singles Chart (Official Charts Company)	4

== Personnel ==
- Jenny Lee Lindberg – bass
- Emily Kokal – guitar, vocals
- Theresa Wayman – guitar, vocals, drums ("Krimson")
- Shannyn Marie Sossamon – drums, vocals
- David Michael Orlando – drums ("Burgundy")
- Josh Klinghoffer – drums ("Billie Holiday"), guitar ("Krimson")
- John Frusciante – mellotron ("Billie Holiday") [uncredited]

=== Recording personnel ===
- Jacob Bercovici – producer & engineer
- John Frusciante – mixing
- Adam Samuels – mixing

=== Artwork ===
- Mia Cassidy Kirby
