= Emily Kokal =

American singer and musician (born 1980)

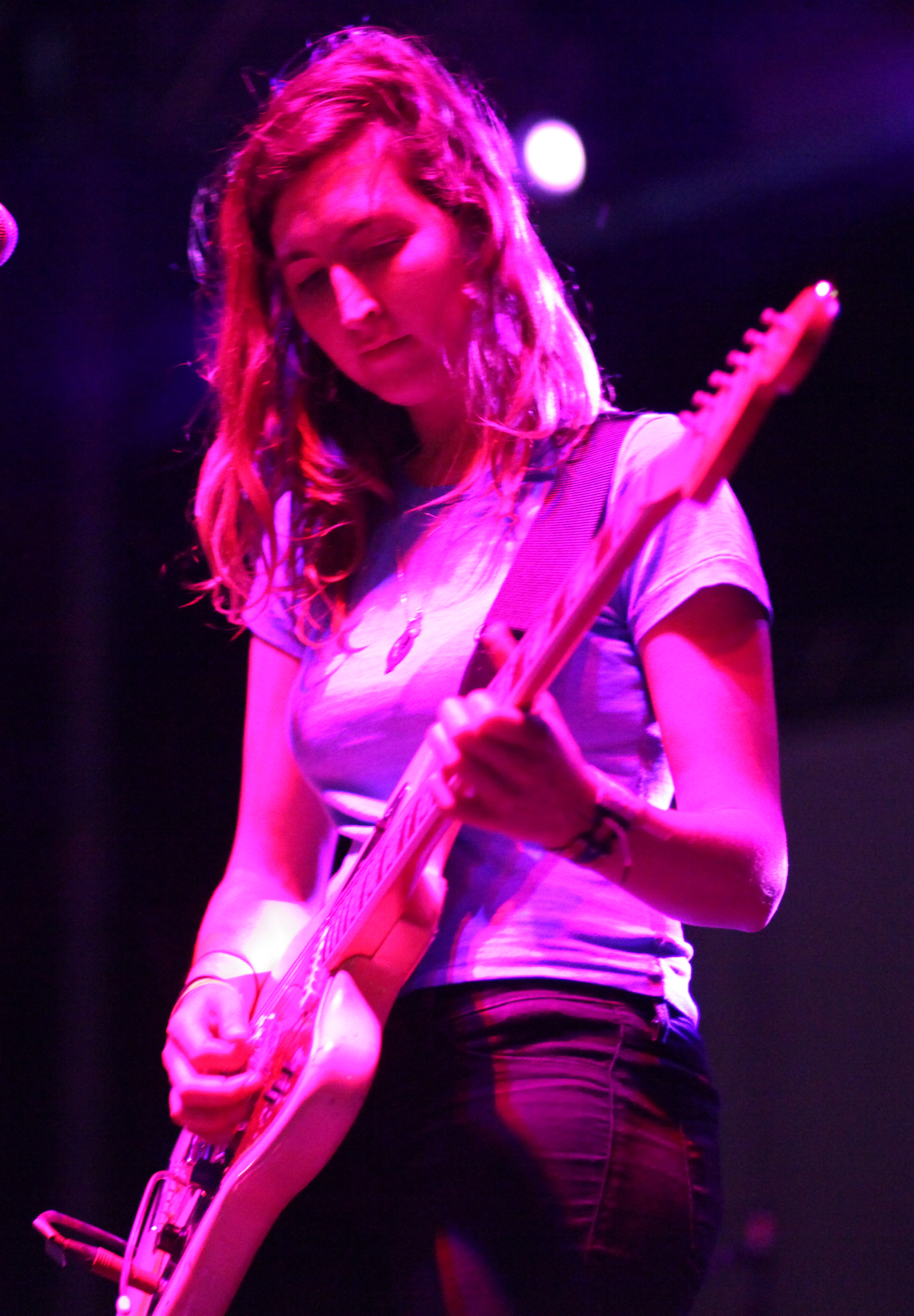
- Kokal performing in 2013

Background information
- Born: September 30, 1980 (age 46); Chico, California, U.S.
- Genres: Indie rock; art rock; dream pop; new wave
- Occupation: Musician
- Instruments: Guitar; vocals
- Years active: 2004–present
- Labels: Rough Trade; Manimal
- Member of: Warpaint
- Website: warpaintwarpaint.com emmyko.bandcamp.com

Emily Camille Kokal (born September 30, 1980) is an American musician. She is best known as the singer and guitarist of the indie rock band Warpaint. Kokal is one of the founding members of the band.

== Early life ==
Kokal was born in Chico, California. At age ten, she moved to Eugene, Oregon, where she met Theresa Wayman, with whom she would later start Warpaint. The two traveled through Europe together in their late teenage years and lived together in New York and Los Angeles. At age 19, Kokal met Jenny Lee Lindberg, another founding member of Warpaint, in LA.

== Career ==
Kokal was the lead singer, guitarist and organist for a project called the Little Two's. In 2001, the band self-released their only album, titled World War IV.

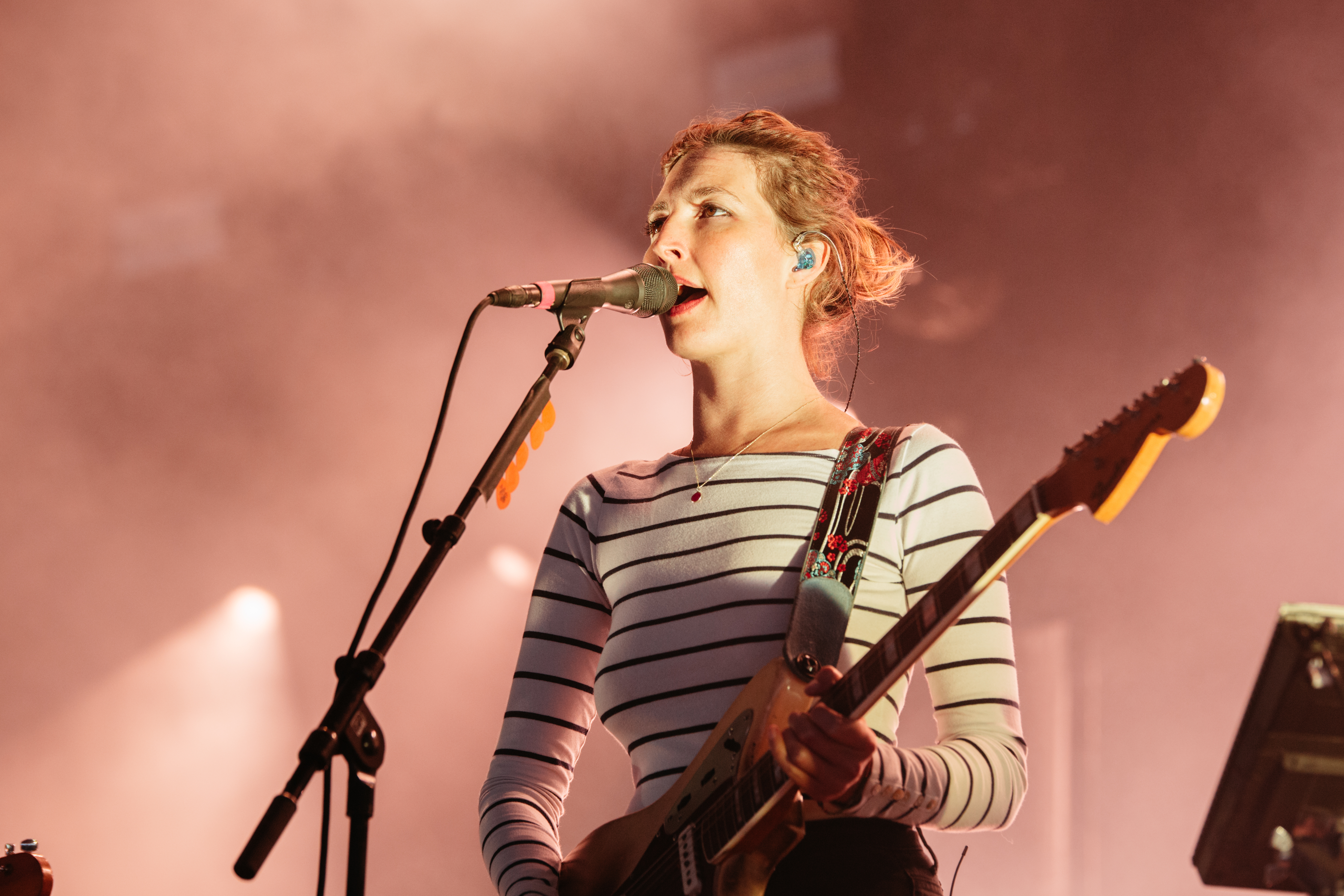
Kokal performing with Warpaint in 2017

In February 2004, Warpaint was formed in Los Angeles, with Kokal singing and playing guitar. As of 2024, Kokal and Warpaint have released four albums and an EP. On the forming of the band, Kokal stated in an interview: "I've always felt this about this band, that it felt blessed. It felt that the right paths were crossing at the right times and the stars were aligned".

Kokal has also made guest appearances as a singer, including singing the chorus in the Red Hot Chili Peppers' song "Desecration Smile".

In 2017, Kokal and bandmate Wayman were voted the "Best Alternative Guitarists in the World Right Now" by MusicRadar and Total Guitar readers.

In 2023, Kokal was featured in the all-female soundtrack of The Buccaneers, which was produced by Stella Mozgawa.

== Personal life ==
Kokal was previously in a relationship with Red Hot Chili Peppers guitarist John Frusciante. Since 2013, Kokal has been in a relationship with LA-based producer j.franxis, of deafmute and FACIAL, and they have a daughter together.

== Discography ==
With Warpaint

- Exquisite Corpse EP (2008)
- The Fool (2010)
- Warpaint (2014)
- Heads Up (2016)
- Radiate Like This (2022)
