= Radiate Like This =

Studio album by Warpaint
- Released: May 6, 2022
- Length: 41:36
- Labels: Heirlooms; Virgin
- Producers: Sam Petts-Davies; Warpaint

Warpaint chronology
Heads Up (2016)	Radiate Like This (2022)

Singles from Radiate Like This
- 1. "Champion" Released: January 26, 2022; 2. "Stevie" Released: May 9, 2022

Radiate Like This is the fourth studio album by American indie rock band Warpaint, released on May 6, 2022, through Heirlooms and Virgin Records. It marks their first album in six years, and was announced alongside the release of the song "Champion". The band toured Europe in support of the album.

== Background ==
Warpaint's preceding album, Heads Up, was released in 2016. Following the release of that album, the band members encountered different priorities, such as "babies, jobs, tours, solo albums, intercontinental and cross country moves", which initially presented "mounting logistical challenges" and doubts about whether they could regroup to work on new material.

== Recording ==
The band began work on the album with producer Sam Petts-Davies in early 2020, but the COVID-19 pandemic caused them to finish recording their parts in their own "makeshift home studios". Although finishing recording "some time ago", they waited to release the album until they could tour to promote it. This self-imposed delay also helped them to "further hone", build and then reconstruct each song. In a press release, Emily Kokal joked that the band should have called it Exquisite Corpse instead of their debut EP.

== Critical reception ==
Professional ratings
Aggregate scores
Source	Rating
Metacritic	79/100
Review scores
Source	Rating
AllMusic	4/5 stars
DIY	4/5 stars
Dork	4/5 stars
Gigwise	8/10 stars
The Line of Best Fit	6/10
Loud and Quiet	7/10
Louder Than War	4/5
NME	4/5 stars
Record Collector	5/5 stars
The Skinny	3/5 stars

Radiate Like This received a score of 79 out of 100 based on 13 reviews on review aggregator Metacritic, indicating "generally favorable" reception. Gordon Rutherford of Louder Than War drew comparisons to Television, The xx and OMD, observing an "extremely enjoyable" album that "sucks you into its vortex and gently turns you inside out before laying you gently back down again".

== Track listing ==
Radiate Like This track listing
No.	Title	Length
1.	"Champion"	4:39
2.	"Hips"	3:20
3.	"Hard to Tell You"	5:00
4.	"Stevie"	4:04
5.	"Like Sweetness"	3:51
6.	"Trouble"	3:42
7.	"Proof"	4:24
8.	"Altar"	4:07
9.	"Melting"	5:09
10.	"Send Nudes"	3:20
Total length:		41:36

== Personnel ==
Warpaint

- Emily Kokal – lead and backing vocals, guitar, keyboards, electronics, production
- Jenny Lee Lindberg – bass, backing and lead vocals, production
- Theresa Wayman – lead and backing vocals, guitar, synthesizer, production
- Stella Mozgawa – drums, keyboards, backing vocals, production

Additional musicians

- Vanessa Freebairn-Smith – strings on "Trouble"

Technical

- Sam Petts-Davies – production, engineering, mixing
- Tucker Martine – mixing, additional production (2–4, 6–9)
- Ewan Pearson – mixing (1)
- Ivan Wayman – mixing, additional production (10)
- John Congleton – additional production and engineering (5, 9)
- Emily Lazar – mastering

Design

- Ikhoor Studio – design, layout
- Jaysun Rickards – cover, photographs

== Charts ==
Chart performance for Radiate Like This
Chart (2022)	Peak position
Belgian Albums (Ultratop Flanders)	74
Belgian Albums (Ultratop Wallonia)	68
German Albums (Offizielle Top 100)	24
Scottish Albums (Official Charts)	8
Swiss Albums (Schweizer Hitparade)	26
UK Albums (Official Charts)	21
US Top Album Sales (Billboard)	54
