= Warpaint (band) =

American alternative rock band

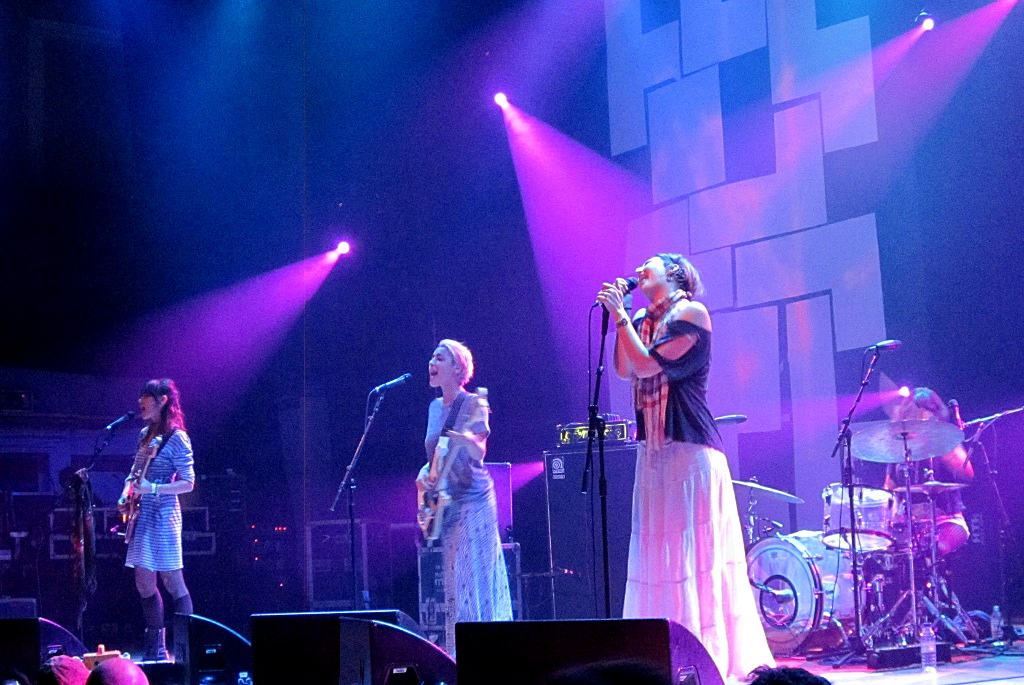
- Warpaint performing in 2011

Background information
- Origin: Los Angeles, California, U.S.
- Genres: Indie rock; post-rock; art rock; dream pop; psychedelic rock; neo-psychedelia
- Years active: 2004–present
- Labels: Manimal Vinyl; Rough Trade
- Members: Emily Kokal; Theresa Wayman; Jenny Lee Lindberg; Stella Mozgawa
- Past members: Shannyn Sossamon; David Orlando; Matthew Pacey; Michael Quinn; Josh Klinghoffer
- Website: warpaintwarpaint.com

Warpaint is an American indie rock band from Los Angeles formed in 2004. The band consists of Emily Kokal (vocals, guitar), Theresa Wayman (vocals, guitar), Jenny Lee Lindberg (bass, vocals), and Stella Mozgawa (drums). The band has released four studio albums: The Fool (2010), Warpaint (2014), Heads Up (2016), and Radiate Like This (2022).

== History ==
=== Beginning and formation (2004–2007) ===
Warpaint formed in Los Angeles on Valentine's Day 2004. The original lineup consisted of childhood friends Wayman and Kokal alongside sisters Lindberg and Shannyn Sossamon. The band played in Los Angeles for three years, writing songs ("Stars", "Beetles" and "Elephants") which eventually were on their debut EP. According to Jenny Lindberg in a 2011 interview with Guardian Music, the band originally went by the name "World War 4" and changed their name to Warpaint only after writing their song "Warpaint" (which they had been playing for years but first appeared on their LP, The Fool).

=== Exquisite Corpse (2007–2010) ===
The band began recording their debut EP, Exquisite Corpse, in December 2007, with producer Jacob Bercovici. Former RHCP guitarist Josh Klinghoffer performed drums and guitar on the EP in 2007. The sessions took over two months and concluded with mixing and mastering by John Frusciante, who was also Kokal's boyfriend at the time. Warpaint self-released the EP in 2008. It became No. 1 in the Los Angeles Amoeba Records local artist chart. In 2009, Exquisite Corpse was rereleased worldwide by Manimal Vinyl.

In the winter of 2009, Australian drummer Stella Mozgawa joined the band. Shortly afterwards, Warpaint were signed to Rough Trade Records and immediately began extensive touring throughout the United States and Europe, including an opening slot for the xx. On December 6 2010, the BBC announced that Warpaint had been nominated for the BBC's Sound of 2011 poll and they were the cover stars of Beat magazine's Winter 2010 launch issue. In 2010, Warpaint contributed a cover of David Bowie's song "Ashes to Ashes" to We Were So Turned On, a Bowie tribute album released in conjunction with War Child.

=== The Fool (2010–2011) ===
On October 25 2010, the band released their debut album, The Fool. The album received a glowing review from NME. "Shadows", the first single from their debut album, was released as a digital download and 12" vinyl on January 10, 2011. A remix of the single, "Shadows (Neon Lights Remix)", proved to be popular and was playlisted by BBC Radio 1 as part of "In New Music We Trust".

In the spring and summer of 2011, Warpaint toured the U.S. and Europe promoting the album. They played at various festivals including Summer Sundae, Bonnaroo, Glastonbury Festival, Reading and Leeds Festivals, Coachella Valley Music and Arts Festival, Rock Werchter, and Electric Picnic. In 2011, the rerelease of the track "Undertow" as a single charted in the UK at No.92 and in Australia at No.75. On September 25, 2011, they played the prestigious Hollywood Bowl, sharing the bill with TV on the Radio, Arctic Monkeys, Panda Bear, and Smith Westerns.

=== Warpaint (2013–2015) ===
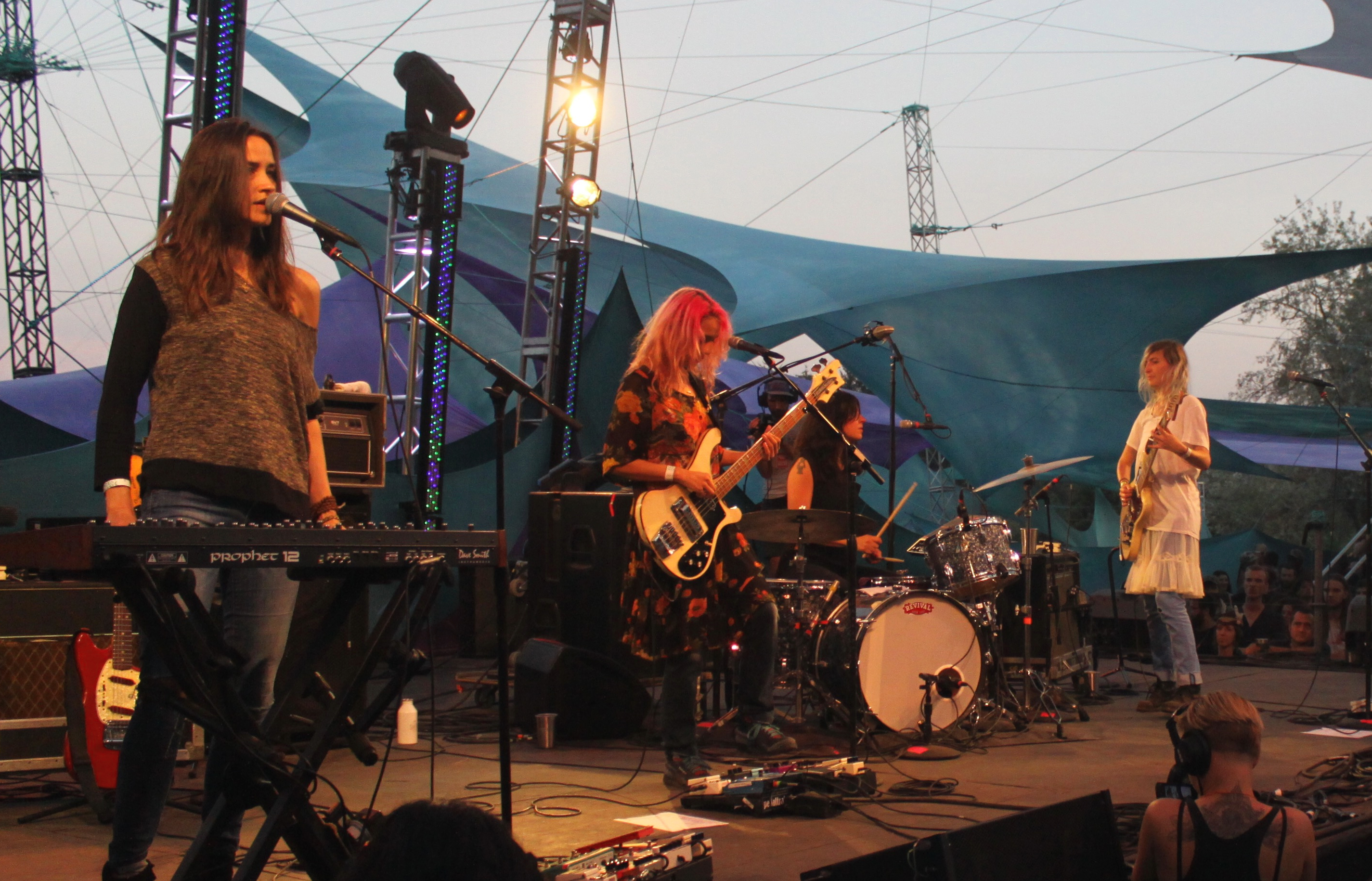
Warpaint performing in 2014

As early as 2011, drummer Mozgawa, in an interview with NME, expressed the band's intention to "experiment and write with one another" as the lineup at the time had never composed songs "from the ground up" together. Bassist Lindberg further indicated that most of the newer songs were written by "just jam[ming] and free-flow[ing] onstage". In February 2013, Wayman confirmed to NME that the band intended to create a minimalist sound on Warpaint, revealing that the band developed songs at soundchecks, and experimented more with acoustic guitars and percussion instruments on the album. Lead vocalist Kokal noted that R&B and rap music were influences on Warpaint and stated that the album featured "things that have drum machines and ambience, music that's more than standard rock". Kokal added that the album was largely keyboards-based, which contributed to the overall sound being "definitely different" from the band's previous album, The Fool.

Produced and mixed by Flood, except for two tracks which were mixed by Nigel Godrich, Warpaint was released by Rough Trade on January 17, 2014 in Germany, Ireland, Netherlands and Switzerland; January 20 in Denmark, France, Sweden and the United Kingdom; and January 21 in Spain and the U.S. A snippet of the album's lead single, "Love Is to Die", was featured in an advertisement for Calvin Klein on September 25, 2013 and later as part of a teaser for an upcoming documentary of the same name about the recording of Warpaint. The single was released on October 28 with the pre-ordered digital version of the album. Crack Magazine named the track No.12 in their "Tracks of the Year 2014".

On November 20, Warpaint performed "Composure," from The Fool, as well as new songs "Love Is to Die" and "Keep It Healthy", on BBC 6 Music with Steve Lamacq in the U.K. The next day, an article from the December 2013 issue of Dazed & Confused magazine appeared online, providing insight into the making of the new album, as well as the accompanying documentary, filmed by Lindberg's husband, video artist Chris Cunningham (the subject of the song "CC"). Lindberg later confirmed in a November 24 interview on XFM that Cunningham's documentary would be made available shortly after the album's release. A music video, composed of a two-song vignette from the second album—"Disco//very" and "Keep it Healthy"—was released in April 2014. Directed by Laban Pheidias, the video featured skateboarding from professional skateboarders Justin Eldridge, Kris Markovich, and Patrick Melcher. On September 23, 2014, the band released a single, 'The Chauffeur', a cover of the song by Duran Duran.

The band toured in promotion of the album up to summer 2015, after which its members began separate projects. Kokal collaborated with folk musician Paul Bergmann, contributing vocals to Bergmann's extended play Romantic Thoughts (2015); Wayman formed a supergroup, BOSS, with Sarah Jones of Hot Chip and Guro Gikling of All We Are, recording material for a solo album; Mozgawa recorded with Andy Clockwise and Kurt Vile; and Lindberg released her debut solo album, Right On! (2015), on which Mozgawa also performed drums.

=== Heads Up (2016–2021) ===
On August 1 2016, Warpaint released a single titled "New Song", and announced the September 23 release of its third studio album, Heads Up. From August 23 until October 27, 2017, they toured as special guest and opening act of Depeche Mode's Global Spirit Tour. Their four dates opening for Depeche Mode at the Hollywood Bowl marked the first time a band played four consecutive shows at the famed Los Angeles venue. The band also toured in support of Harry Styles on a handful of dates in Asia in May 2018, as well as supporting Foals in Australia in July 2019. In 2020, Mozgawa returned to Australia to record with Courtney Barnett, but remained there for some time due to the COVID-19 pandemic. In December 2020, Warpaint performed a live-streamed acoustic show at the Lodge Room in Los Angeles, without Mozgawa.

On March 19, 2021, Warpaint released the single 'Paralysed', a cover from band Gang of Four. The track is part of a tribute album The Problem of Leisure. A Celebration of Andy Gill and Gang of Four, which was released on June 4, 2021. On April 30, 2021, Warpaint released the single "Lilys".

=== Radiate Like This (2022–present) ===
The band began recording Radiate Like This in 2019. Due to the Covid-19 pandemic, they recorded their parts in their own homes and studios throughout 2020 and 2021.

On January 26, 2022, Warpaint released the song "Champion". It is the lead single from the band's fourth studio album, Radiate Like This, which was released on May 6, 2022 via Virgin Records. For the band's 20 year anniversary, they released the single "Common Blue" on February 14, 2024 via their YouTube channel, followed by the single "Underneath" on March 21, 2024.

== Style ==
Warpaint's style has been characterized as art rock, dream pop, and psychedelic rock. NME said their style is "intermittently emerging from plaintive moods into harder rocking, they play expansive, lushly-harmonic psych-rock songs with enough time-changes to satisfy even the most beardy prog-rock bong-tokers". They have been compared to the Cocteau Twins, Joni Mitchell, and Siouxsie and the Banshees. Other influences of theirs likely include Kraftwerk, Depeche Mode, and Public Image Ltd.

== Members ==
Current members

- Emily Kokal – lead and backing vocals, guitar, keyboards, electronics (2004–present)
- Jenny Lee Lindberg – bass, backing and lead vocals (2004–present)
- Theresa Wayman – lead and backing vocals, guitar, synthesizer, drums (2004–present)
- Stella Mozgawa – drums, keyboards, guitar, backing vocals (2009–present)

Former members

- Shannyn Sossamon – drums, backing vocals (2004–2007)
- David Orlando – drums (2007–2008)
- Matthew Pacey – drums (2008)
- Josh Klinghoffer – drums, guitar (2008–2009)
- Michael Quinn – drums, cello (2009)

== Discography ==
=== Studio albums ===
- The Fool (2010)
- Warpaint (2014)
- Heads Up (2016)
- Radiate Like This (2022)

=== EPs ===
- Exquisite Corpse (2009)

== Features in film and TV ==
Warpaint's songs have featured on films and media including:

- 2011 – "Elephants" featured in the independent horror film Siren, directed by Andrew Hull and released by Lionsgate.
- 2021 – "Lilys" featured in the HBO series Made for Love.
