= Cate Le Bon discography =

Discography of Welsh singer-songwriter Cate Le Bon

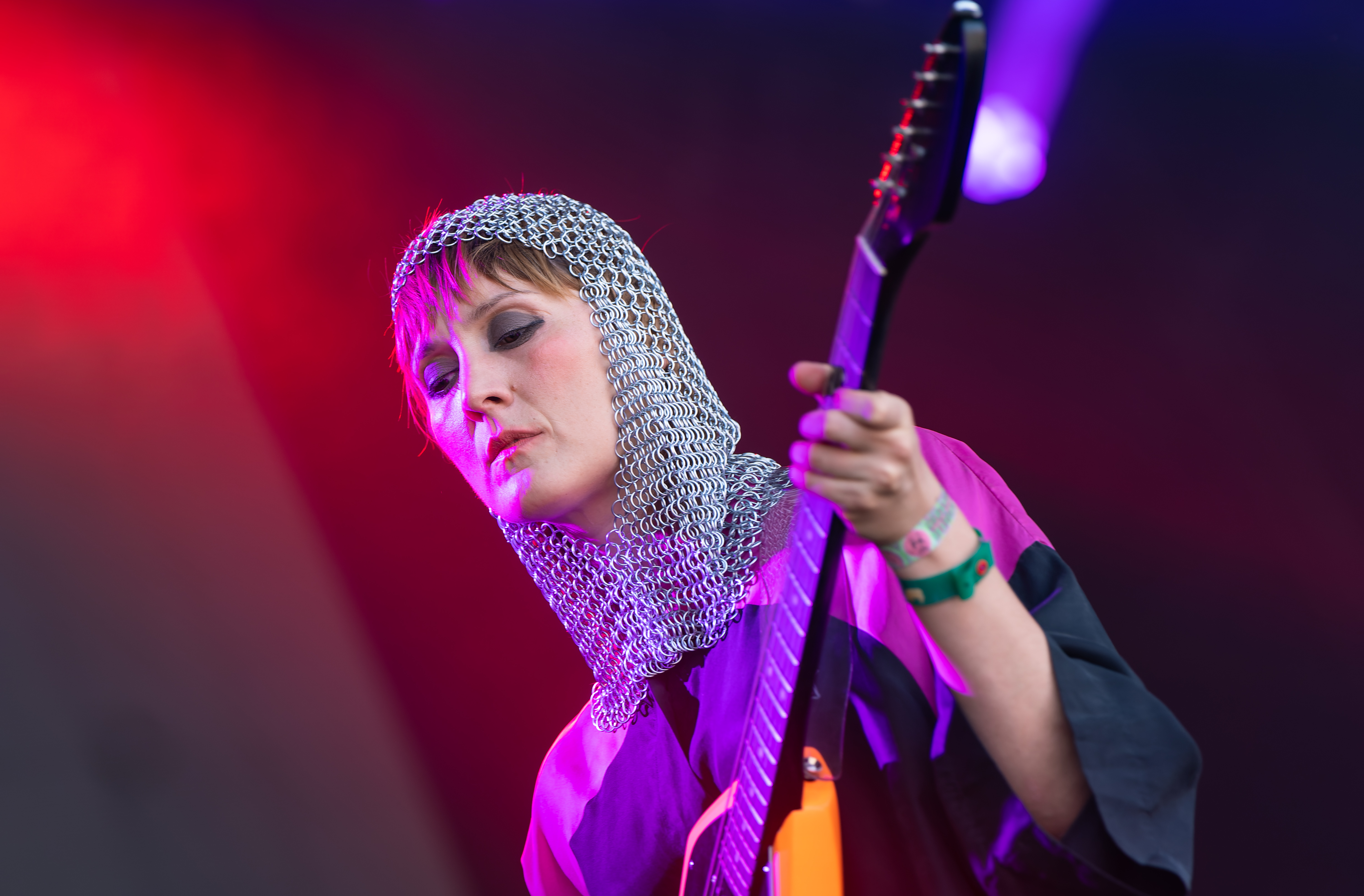
- Le Bon performing at Glastonbury in 2022.
- Studio albums: 9
- EPs: 5
- Singles: 14
- Music videos: 15

The discography of Welsh singer-songwriter Cate Le Bon currently contains seven studio albums, two collaborative albums under the moniker Drinks with Tim Presley, five extended plays, 14 singles, and 15 music videos. Cate Le Bon (born Cate Timothy) has been releasing music since 2007, and sings in both English and Welsh. Le Bon is also one half of duo Drinks, alongside Tim Presley. Le Bon has made many appearances on other artists' projects, including St. Vincent, Neon Neon, and Manic Street Preachers.

== Albums ==
=== Studio albums ===
List of studio albums, as well as the release date, label, and format associated with each album
Title	Album details
Me Oh My	Released: 12 October 2009; Label: Irony Bored; Formats: CD, LP, cassette, digital download
Cyrk	Released: 17 January 2012; Label: The Control Group; Formats: CD, LP, digital download
Mug Museum	Released: 12 November 2013; Labels: Turnstile and Witchita; Formats: LP, CD, digital download
Hermits on Holiday (as Drinks)	Released: 21 August 2015; Label: Heavenly Recordings; Formats: LP, CD, digital download
Crab Day	Released: 15 April 2016; Labels: Drag City, Turnstile, and Caroline International; Formats: CD, LP, cassette, digital download
Hippo Lite (as Drinks)	Released: 20 April 2018; Label: Drag City; Formats: CD, LP, cassette, digital download
Reward	Released: 24 May 2019; Label: Mexican Summer; Formats: CD, LP, digital download
Pompeii	Released: 4 February 2022; Label: Mexican Summer; Formats: CD, LP, cassette, digital download
Michelangelo Dying	Released: 26 September 2025; Label: Mexican Summer; Formats: CD, LP, digital download

== Extended plays ==
Title	EP details
Edrych yn Llygaid Ceffyl Benthyg	Released: 7 July 2008; Label: Peski Records
Cyrk II	Released: 16 August 2012; Label: Turnstile
Rock Pool	Released: 27 January 2017; Label: Drag City
Myths 004 (with Bradford Cox)	Released: 1 November 2019; Label: Mexican Summer
Here it Comes Again (with Group Listening)	Released: 21 February 2020; Label: Mexican Summer

== Singles ==
List of singles, as well as year of release
Title	Year	Album
"No One Can Drag Me Down"	2007	Non-album single
"Hollow Trees House Hounds"	2009	Me Oh My
"Shoeing the Bones"	2010	Me Oh My
"I Think I Knew" (with Perfume Genius)	2013	Mug Museum
"Are You With Me Now?"	2013	Mug Museum
"I Can't Help You"	2014	Mug Museum
"Wonderful"	2016	Crab Day
"Love Is Not Love"	2016	Crab Day
"Daylight Matters"	2019	Reward
"Home to You"	2019	Reward
"The Light"	2019	Reward
"Running Away"	2021	Pompeii
"Moderation"	2021	Pompeii
"Remembering Me"	2022	Pompeii
"Typical Love"	2022	Non-album single
"Heaven Is No Feeling"	2025	Michelangelo Dying
"Is It Worth It? (Happy Birthday)"	2025	Michelangelo Dying
"About Time"	2025	Michelangelo Dying
"Always the Same" (with St. Vincent)	2026	Non-album single

== Other appearances ==
List of guest appearances, with other performing artists, showing year released and album name
Title	Year	Other artist(s)	Album
"I Lust U"	2008	Neon Neon	Stainless Style
"Bym ar Gwmwl"	2008	Plant Duw	Y Capel Hyfryd
"Do As I Do"	2011	Boom Bip	Zig Zaj
"Mid Century Modern Nightmare"	2013	Neon Neon	Praxis Makes Perfect
"4 Lonely Roads"	2013	Manic Street Preachers	Rewind the Film
"Gallant Foxes"	2014	Davidge	Slo Light
"All Born Screaming"	2024	St. Vincent	All Born Screaming
"Todos Nacen Gritando"	2024	St. Vincent	Todos Nacen Gritando

== Remixes ==
List of guest appearances, with other performing artists, and year released
Title	Year	Artist(s)	Album
"Are We Good?" (Cate Le Bon Remix)	2018	Eleanor Friedberger	non-album remix
"Sophie La Bévue" (Cate Le Bon Interpretation)	2021	Aksak Maboul	Redrawn Figures 1
