= Josiah Steinbrick =

American musician

- Born: Josiah Clark Steinbrick; July 13, 1981 (age 44)
- Origin: Providence, Rhode Island, U.S.
- Genres: Jazz; electronic; dream pop; Minimal music; lo-fi
- Occupations: Musician, composer, producer
- Instruments: Guitar; bass; piano; synthesizer; percussion; drums
- Years active: 2006–present

Josiah Clark Steinbrick (born July 13, 1981) is an American multi-instrumentalist, composer, and record producer, currently based in Los Angeles, California, United States. Aside from his own solo works and performances with his BANANA ensemble, he has produced albums by Cate Le Bon and Devendra Banhart and has recorded with artists such as Danger Mouse, Charlotte Gainsbourg, Gruff Rhys, Rodrigo Amarante, and Sam Gendel. He provided the score to the 2020 film, Horse Girl, starring Alison Brie.

== Selected discography ==
=== 2009 ===
- Joker's Daughter – The Last Laugh – guitar, bass, Synthesizer

=== 2010 ===
- Adam Green – Minor Love – bass, Synthesizer, Omnichord
- White Fence – "Live in L.A." (Cassette) – bass

=== 2011 ===
- Boom Bip – Zig Zaj – bass, Synthesizer, Percussion

=== 2012 ===
- Charlotte Gainsbourg – Stage Whisper – Sitar Guitar
- Electric Guest – Mondo – bass, guitar (Electric), Harpsichord, Synthesizer

=== 2013 ===
- Adam Green & Binki Shapiro – bass, guitar, piano, Kalimba, Omnichord, Synthesizer
- Devendra Banhart – Mala – bass, Clapping, Dulcimer, Percussion, Soloist, Synthesizer, Synthesizer Saxophone
- Neon Neon – Praxis Makes Perfect – composer, Synthesizer
- Cate Le Bon – Mug Museum – producer, guitar, Organ, Synthesizer, Drums
- Rodrigo Amarante – "Cavalo" – Backing Vocals

=== 2015 ===
- H. Hawkline – In the Pink of Condition – bass, guitar, piano, Harpsichord, Synthesizer
- Flo Morrissey – Tomorrow Will Be Beautiful – bass, Harpsichord

=== 2016 ===
- Cate Le Bon – Crab Day – producer, piano, bass, percussion
- Adam Green – Aladdin Soundtrack – bass, Synthesizers, Piano
- Devendra Banhart – Ape in Pink Marble – producer, composer, bass, Synthesizers, Electric Piano, Guitar, Drums, Percussion, Koto, Marimba, Backing Vocals

=== 2017 ===
- BANANA (also featuring Cate Le Bon, Sweet Baboo, H. Hawkline, Stella Mozgawa and Josh Klinghoffer) – Live – composer, producer, Vibraphone, Piano

=== 2018 ===
- Josiah Steinbrick – Meeting of Waters – composer, Marimba, Vibraphone, Drums, Percussion, Synthesizer

=== 2019 ===
- Cate Le Bon – Reward – producer, percussion, Synthesizers
- Devendra Banhart – Ma – Synthesizers, Vibraphone
