= Pompeii (Cate Le Bon album) =

Studio album by Cate Le Bon
- Released: 4 February 2022
- Studios: Plantagenet Street (Wales); Studiowz (Sir Benfro); Golden Retriever Studio (Sydney); Vacant TV Studios (London)
- Genre: Art pop
- Length: 43:18
- Label: Mexican Summer
- Producers: Cate Le Bon; Samur Khouja

Cate Le Bon chronology
Reward (2019)	Pompeii (2022)	Michelangelo Dying (2025)

Pompeii is the sixth studio album by the Welsh singer and producer Cate Le Bon, released on 4 February 2022 by Mexican Summer.

== Background and recording ==
Le Bon began working on the album during the first wave of the COVID-19 pandemic in Wales, in a Cardiff Victorian terrace owned by fellow Welsh musician Gruff Rhys.

== Composition ==
Musically, Pompeii takes on "penetrating" art pop. It is also influenced by Japanese city pop, with the style reflected in Le Bon's synth work.

== Critical reception ==
Professional ratings
Aggregate scores
Source	Rating
AnyDecentMusic?	8.1/10
Metacritic	85/100
Review scores
Source	Rating
AllMusic	4/5 stars
Clash	8/10
DIY	4/5 stars
Exclaim!	8/10
The Independent	5/5 stars
The Line of Best Fit	8/10
NME	4/5 stars
The Observer	3/5 stars
Pitchfork	8.5/10
The Times	4/5 stars

According to the review aggregator Metacritic, Pompeii received "universal acclaim" based on a weighted average score of 85 out of 100 from 20 critic scores.

Year-end lists
Publication	List	Rank	Ref.
Albumism	The 100 Best Albums of 2022	23	
BrooklynVegan	Indie Basement: Top 40 Albums of 2022	32	
Exclaim!	Exclaim!'s 50 Best Albums of 2022	30	
The Forty-Five	Albums of the year 2022	30	
Mojo	The 50 Best Albums of 2022	21	
New Commute	New Commute's Albums of the Year	N/A	
Northern Transmission	Top 50 Albums of 2022	47	
ourculture	The 50 Best Albums of 2022	21	
Paste	The 50 Best Albums of 2022	15	
Pitchfork	The 50 Best Albums of 2022	20	
Pitchfork	The 38 Best Rock Albums of 2022	N/A	
Slant Magazine	The 50 Best Albums of 2022	48	
Slate	The Best Albums of 2022	Honorable Mention	
Treble	The 50 Best Albums of 2022	10	
Uncut	Best New Albums of 2022	13	
Under the Radar	The 100 Best Albums of 2022	36	

== Track listing ==
All tracks are written by Cate Le Bon.

Pompeii track listing
No.	Title	Length
1.	"Dirt on the Bed"	4:28
2.	"Moderation"	4:04
3.	"French Boys"	5:14
4.	"Pompeii"	4:35
5.	"Harbour"	4:08
6.	"Running Away"	5:43
7.	"Cry Me Old Trouble"	5:04
8.	"Remembering Me"	4:34
9.	"Wheel"	5:28
Total length:		43:18

== Personnel ==
- Cate Le Bon – vocals, guitar, bass guitar, synthesizers, piano, percussion, production
- Samur Khouja – production, mixing, engineering
- H. Hawkline – co-production, design, photography
- Heba Kadry – mastering
- Simon Berckelman – engineering
- Euan Hinshelwood – saxophone, vocal engineering
- Stella Mozgawa – drums
- Stephen Black – saxophone, clarinet
- Chloe Dadd – engineering assistance
- Casey Raymond – photography

== Charts ==
Chart performance for Pompeii
Chart (2022)	Peak position
Portuguese Albums (AFP)	43
Scottish Albums (Official Charts)	15
UK Albums (Official Charts)	70
UK Independent Albums (Official Charts)	6
US Billboard 200	31
