= Milk for Flowers =

Studio album by H. Hawkline
- Released: March 10, 2023
- Genre: Pop
- Length: 45:59
- Label: Heavenly
- Producer: Cate Le Bon

H. Hawkline chronology
I Romanticize (2017)	Milk for Flowers (2023)

Milk for Flowers is the fifth studio album by Welsh songwriter H. Hawkline. It was released through Heavenly Recordings on 10 March 2023, and was met with positive critical reception.

== Composition ==
Milk for Flowers is a pop album.

== Release and reception ==
Professional ratings
Aggregate scores
Source	Rating
Metacritic	84/100
Review scores
Source	Rating
AllMusic	4/5 stars
Loud and Quiet	8/10
The Observer	4/5 stars
Pitchfork	7.2/10
Under the Radar	8.5/10

Milk for Flowers was released through Heavenly Recordings on 10 March 2023.

According to the review aggregator Metacritic, Milk for Flowers received "universal acclaim" based on a weighted average score of 84 out of 100 from 6 critic scores. The album received positive reviews from AllMusic, Pitchfork, The Observer, Loud and Quiet, and Under the Radar.

== Track listing ==
No.	Title	Length
1.	"Milk For Flowers"	3:47
2.	"Plastic Man"	3:01
3.	"Suppression Street"	3:58
4.	"I Need Him"	4:18
5.	"Denver"	5:58
6.	"Athens at Night"	3:48
7.	"Like You Do"	5:17
8.	"It's a Living"	4:50
9.	"Mostly"	4:18
10.	"Empty Room"	6:40
Total length:		45:59
