= Michelangelo Dying =

Studio album by Cate Le Bon
- Released: 26 September 2025
- Studio: Pigboy (Cardiff); Old Carpet Factory (Hydra); Vacant TV (London); Seahorse Sounds (Los Angeles); Arm (Los Angeles)
- Length: 43:18
- Label: Mexican Summer
- Producer: Cate Le Bon; Samur Khouja

Cate Le Bon chronology
Pompeii (2022)	Michelangelo Dying (2025)

Singles from Michelangelo Dying
- 1. "Heaven Is No Feeling" Released: 3 June 2025; 2. "Is It Worth It (Happy Birthday)?" Released: 22 July 2025; 3. "About Time" Released: 3 September 2025

Michelangelo Dying is the seventh studio album by Welsh singer and producer Cate Le Bon. Produced by Le Bon and Samur Khouja, it was released on 26 September 2025 by Mexican Summer.

== Background and recording ==
The album was made between Hydra, Cardiff, London, and Los Angeles. The album was finished in the Joshua Tree desert.

Le Bon revealed the album was meant to come out a year earlier in 2024, but felt too sick and exhausted after a break-up. Le Bon described the album as: "realising you've completely abandoned yourself in the throes of this all-encompassing love. The breakup was always like an amputation that you don't really want, but you know will save you."

== Packaging ==
The album's packaging and imagery was inspired by artist Colette Lumiere's installation Recently Discovered Ruins of a Dream, which depicts a woman lying in a chamber draped in fabric, while mirrors line the floor. Le Bon said: "That's what I really wanted the record to feel like, you can roll up your sleeves and take something on, then you have a rest, because something is resolved." The picture in the centre of the album cover depicts Le Bon "drowning", surrounded by mirrors.

== Critical reception ==
Professional ratings
Aggregate scores
Source	Rating
AnyDecentMusic?	8.2/10
Metacritic	88/100
Review scores
Source	Rating
AllMusic	4/5 stars
Clash	8/10
Exclaim!	8/10
Mojo	5/5 stars
MusicOMH	4.5/5 stars
Paste	8.2/10
Pitchfork	8.1/10
Record Collector	4/5 stars
Rolling Stone	4.5/5 stars
Uncut	8/10

According to the review aggregator Metacritic, Michelangelo Dying received "universal acclaim" based on a weighted average score of 88 out of 100 from 14 critic scores.

=== Year-end lists ===
Publication	List	Rank	Ref.
AllMusic	Favorite Singer/Songwriter Albums	N/A	
The Fader	The 50 Best Albums of 2025	26	
The Guardian	The 50 Best Albums of 2025	23	
Mojo	The 75 Best Albums of 2025	28	
Record Collector	The Best of 2025: New Albums Top 25	14	
Rolling Stone	The 55 Best Indie-Rock Albums of 2025	34	
Uncut	Best New Albums of 2025	46	
Under the Radar	Top 100 Albums of 2025	70	

== Track listing ==
All tracks are written by Cate Le Bon.

Michelangelo Dying track listing
No.	Title	Length
1.	"Jerome"	4:06
2.	"Love Unrehearsed"	4:14
3.	"Mothers of Riches"	4:34
4.	"Is It Worth It (Happy Birthday)?"	5:47
5.	"Pieces of My Heart"	3:39
6.	"About Time"	3:30
7.	"Heaven Is No Feeling"	3:48
8.	"Body as a River"	4:30
9.	"Ride" (featuring John Cale)	3:53
10.	"I Know What's Nice"	5:20
Total length:		43:21

== Personnel ==
Except where noted, credits are adapted from the CD liner notes.

=== Musicians ===
- Cate Le Bon – synthesisers, vocals, arrangement (all tracks); guitars (except track 9), bass (except 6), piano (5), percussion (8, 10)
- Valentina Magaletti – percussion (except 10), drums (2, 5)
- Euan Hinshelwood – saxophones (except 6)
- Paul Jones – piano (1–4, 8, 10), synthesiser (9)
- Dylan Hadley – drums (1, 3, 4, 6, 7, 9, 10)
- H. Hawkline – vocals (8)
- John Cale – vocals (9)

=== Technical ===
- Samur Khouja – production, engineering, mixing
- Cate Le Bon – production
- Stephen Black – additional engineering
- Euan Hinshelwood – additional engineering
- Dustin Boyer – engineering of John Cale's vocals at Arm Studios, Los Angeles (9)
- Heba Kadry – mastering

=== Design ===
- H. Hawkline – art direction, photography, design
- Cadi Lane – fabric walls
- Christian Fritzenwanker – hair and makeup
- Kim Howells – stylist

== Charts ==
Chart performance for Michelangelo Dying
Chart (2025)	Peak position
French Rock & Metal Albums (SNEP)	68
Scottish Albums (OCC)	40
UK Albums Sales (OCC)	21
UK Independent Albums (OCC)	9
