= Flying Wig =

Studio album by Devendra Banhart
- Released: September 22, 2023
- Studio: Cabin studio, Topanga, California
- Length: 47:59
- Label: Mexican Summer
- Producer: Cate Le Bon

Devendra Banhart chronology
Ma (2019)	Flying Wig (2023)

Singles from Flying Wig
- 1. "Twin" Released: June 13, 2023; 2. "Sirens" Released: July 27, 2023

Flying Wig is the eleventh studio album by Venezuelan-American musician Devendra Banhart. It was released on September 22, 2023, as his label debut on Mexican Summer.

== Background ==
For the album, Banhart partnered with Welsh musician and producer Cate Le Bon, who produced the project. Of the collaboration, Banhart said that he only wanted to make this album with Le Bon. In order "to draw out and emphasize the emotional aspect of a synthesizer", Flying Wig explores a more "synth"-oriented sound. Banhart wanted a record that is set apart from his previous works, only feasible with a new "creative partner" on his side. Inspiration was drawn from a poem by Kobayashi Issa, which Banhart thought highlights a person's "ability to face despair with hope, to keep on failing and loving". Recording took place in a cabin studio in Topanga. During most of the writing and recording sessions, Banhart wore a dress gifted by Le Bon and pearls from his grandmother. He wanted to tap into his "feminine side" which feels powerful, yet "safe and comfortable" to him. In his view, the album reflects that "searching for a safe feeling". Banhart and Le Bon mostly worked with a tight circle of trusted collaborators for the album, with mixing and engineering handled by Samur Khouja and mastering by Heba Kadry.

Banhart announced the album and shared the lead single "Twin" on June 13, 2023. A second single "Sirens" was released on July 27 and explores "the sensual side of sorrow, the mournful side of joy", accompanied by a Sci-Fi-inspired video in collaboration with Christian Stavros and Joseph Wasilewski. His first album in four years, following Ma (2019), it marks his first release since signing with Mexican Summer. In promotion of the album, the musician will tour through North America and Europe in late 2023.

== Critical reception ==
Professional ratings
Aggregate scores
Source	Rating
AnyDecentMusic?	6.7/10
Metacritic	74/100
Review scores
Source	Rating
AllMusic	4/5 stars
Mojo	3/5 stars
MusicOMH	3/5 stars
Pitchfork	6.9/10
PopMatters	7/10
Uncut	8/10
Under the Radar	7.5/10

Flying Wig received a score of 74 out of 100 on review aggregator Metacritic based on six critics' reviews, indicating "generally favorable" reception. Uncut stated that "the antic hippie of Banhart's early work is long gone on this depressed but not despairing record, warmed by the melancholy, spacy hush of his voice over drifting synths and the bass's heartbeat pulse", while Mojo called it "intimate, ambitious and just occasionally misfiring".

== Track listing ==
All tracks are written by Devendra Banhart and Cate le Bon, except where noted.

Flying Wig track listing
No.	Title	Length
1.	"Feeling"	6:19
2.	"Fireflies"	4:51
3.	"Nun"	3:28
4.	"Sight Seer"	5:03
5.	"Sirens"	4:28
6.	"Charger"	4:18
7.	"Flying Wig" (Banhart)	5:32
8.	"Twin" (Banhart, le Bon, Nicole Lawrence)	6:00
9.	"May" (Banhart)	4:39
10.	"The Party"	3:21
Total length:		47:59
