= Praxis Makes Perfect =

Studio album by Neon Neon
- Released: 29 April 2013
- Genres: Pop, electronica, hip-hop
- Length: 31:15; 43:49 (with Years of Lead EP)
- Label: Lex
- Producers: Boom Bip, Gruff Rhys

Neon Neon chronology
Stainless Style (2008)	Praxis Makes Perfect (2013)

Singles from Praxis Makes Perfect
- 1. "Mid Century Modern Nightmare" Released: 10 April 2013; 2. "Hammer & Sickle" Released: 5 May 2013

Praxis Makes Perfect is the second studio album by the pop-electronica-hip-hop duo Neon Neon, which was produced by Boom Bip and Gruff Rhys, and the album was released on 29 April 2013 by Lex Records. Praxis Makes Perfect is a concept album based on the life of influential Italian publisher Giangiacomo Feltrinelli. The album charted at No. 43 in the United Kingdom. Between May and October 2013, the album was performed live as an immersive gig theatre performance with National Theatre Wales.

== Music ==
Heather Phares of AllMusic told that "aside from the biographical concept and the largely electronic arrangements, they don't repeat themselves much." At Fact, Steve Shaw affirmed that the release "possesses all of the keen humour of the former, modest and understated to a tee." Dan Lucas of Under the Radar said that "the appeal of the album lies in its musicianship and perfect production", and that the "synths and drum machines create a panic-laden sci-fi landscape; meanwhile, acoustic guitars slip deftly in and out of the songs." At Mojo, Andy Cowan felt that the release "achieves the tricky balancing act between playful [...] and poignant". David Welsh of musicOMH said that the release is "crammed with literary snippets," and has "realpolitik themes", however "for all the fresh blood, this is familiar territory." At NME, Alex Hoban noted that "ironically, the depth of the source material shows up the problem with concept albums – no matter how great the idea, it still needs killer hooks." Anna Wilson Clash wrote that it is "audaciously ambitious in conceptual scope, it’s not evenly matched in musicality." PopMatters' Evan Sawdey noted that "the album is missing that quintessential 'something', their lyrics more pointed yet somehow less focused, their journey meandering, their use of narration forcing the concept upon the listener instead of letting it happen naturally." At Loud and Quiet, Chris Watkeys told that in "listening to this album [it] feels like walking around inside a glistening, neon pink kaleidoscope, or a musical sweet shop where there aren't any flavours you don't like."

== Critical reception ==
Professional ratings
Review scores
Source	Rating
AllMusic	4/5 stars
Evening Standard	3/5 stars
Fact	4/5 discs
The Guardian	3/5 stars
Mojo	4/5 stars
musicOMH	3.5/5 stars
NME	7/10
The Observer	3/5 stars
Q	4/5 stars
The Skinny	4/5 stars

Praxis Makes Perfect has received generally positive reception by music critics. At Metacritic, the assign a "weighted average" score to ratings and reviews from selected mainstream music critics, which based on 21 reviews, the album holds a Metascore of 71. At AnyDecentMusic?, they assign a "weighted average" rating to selected mainstream ratings and reviews, which based on 24 reviews, the album has a rating of 7.1-out-of-ten.

Heather Phares of AllMusic wrote that "this is a wonderfully entertaining collection of pop songs that just happen to be well-versed in history and political and economic theories." At Fact, Steve Shaw highlighted that this album is "displaying a razor wit and awareness of a goal at the same time." Dan Lucas of Under the Radar said that "Praxis Makes Perfect confirms the pun-happy pairing as leaders in the admittedly niche genre of concept albums about historical figures with whom listeners may at first not be familiar." At Mojo, Andy Cowan called the effort "a master-class in high-voltage electronic pop, whether you buy into its concept or not." Simon McEwen of Q told that the album in being "concise at just 30 minutes, perhaps explaining why 'the concept' is not fully realised, but it is still unlikely you'll hear a better anti-fascist-Marxists-electro-pop record all year." Drowned in Sound's Aaron Lavery rated the album an 8-out-of-ten, and wrote that it "works better as a cohesive record, dipping you into a strange mix of left-wing politics and cheery synth pop." At This Is Fake DIY, David Rowlinson rated the album an 8-out-of-ten, and wrote that the album is imbued "with an undoubtable sincerity", and noted how the release "transcends any concept and leaves you with simple endearing pop moments you just can’t help but fall for." Chris Watkeys of Loud and Quiet rated the album an 8-out-of-ten, and called this "a half-hour slice of perfectly formed, instantly accessible, shiny melodic sonic joy." At The Skinny, Wilbur Kane proclaimed this album to be "a synthesised delight."

At NME, Alex Hoban told that "Ultimately the confusion and convolution is all part of the charm on this adventure into a world of history and imagination." David Welsh of musicOMH wrote that the "side project, collaboration or fully fledged act, Neon Neon have a Mercury nomination under their belts – and now a follow-up LP that, for better or worse, peddles the same worthy wares." Pitchfork Media's Marc Hogan rated the album a 7.0-out-of-ten, and said that "Praxis Makes Perfect's songs never quite hit the highs of its predecessor's best tracks, but it's a more coherent album, and still strangely rewarding in its own way." At Clash, Anna Wilson rated the album a 7-out-of-ten, and noted that "nevertheless an appealing curio and trailblazer in the small sphere of biographical concept albums." Ben Graham of The Quietus felt an incongruence between the album's thematic concept and its blend of "club music, OMD, the Pet Shop Boys, early Madonna and Prefab Sprout." He added, however, that "Once you've accepted that this is just the way it's going to be, there's much to get your teeth into on Praxis Makes Perfect... When it's good it's great, and it's never bad."

However, The Guardian's Maddy Costa told that "Praxis doesn't quite make perfect on the second album [...] but there are times when it comes close." At The Observer, Kitty Empire wrote that "Praxis Makes Perfect might lack in fresh musical directions [...] their percolating analogue-digital pop remains little altered [...] it makes up for in apposite italophile detail." Sam Richards of Uncut rated the album a 6-out-of-ten, and called the album "fun", yet at the same time "musically filmsy", and wrote that "the songs here aren't quite as strong" as on the first album. At the Evening Standard, David Smyth noted that "the lo-fi electronica sound is less imaginative than the concept but the tunes lift this sparse oddity." PopMatters' Evan Sawdey rated the album a 4-out-of-ten, and told that "after listening to the album, however, perhaps we can expect something a bit more focused in five more."

== Commercial performance ==
Praxis Makes Perfect was the No. 43 sold album in all of the United Kingdom in its debut week. The albums spent a total of two weeks on the chart.

== Track listing ==
All tracks are written by Neon Neon; Except where indicated.

No.	Title	Length
1.	"Praxis Makes Perfect"	2:53
2.	"The Jaguar"	3:01
3.	"Dr. Zhivago"	3:51
4.	"Hoops with Fidel"	2:54
5.	"Hammer & Sickle"	2:51
6.	"Shopping (I Like To)" (featuring Sabrina)	3:06
7.	"Mid Century Modern Nightmare" (featuring Cate Le Bon)	1:58
8.	"The Leopard" (featuring Erica Daking)	3:15
9.	"Listen to the Rainbow"	3:24
10.	"Ciao Feltrinelli"	4:02
Total length:		31:15

Limited Edition Deluxe CD2 - Years of Lead
No.	Title	Writer(s)	Length
1.	"Years of Lead"	Neon Neon, Josiah Clark Steinbrick	3:32
2.	"Non Aligned States"	Neon Neon, Josiah Clark Steinbeck	3:42
3.	"Socialism at Sea (Take in the Sails, Head into the Wind)"		2:31
4.	"Fuga in Avanti"	Neon Neon, Josiah Clark Steinbrick	2:48
Total length:			12:34

== Personnel ==
Technical

- Boom Bip - producer
- Gruff Rhys - producer
- Andre Valfre - engineer (RCM Treviso)
- Sir Doufus Styles - engineer (Wings for Jesus Mobile)
- Kris Kenkins - assistant engineer
- Hugo James Nicolson - engineer (Los Angeles)
- Jason Burkhart - assistant engineer (Los Angeles, The Lodge)
- Chris Shaw - mixing
- John Dent - mastering
- Milly Wright - design concept
- Dlt - additional layout and design
- Photographs courtesy of the Feltrinelli Foundation.

Guest appearances

- Asia Argento - narration (1, 4, 7–10)
- Sabrina Salerno - vocals (6)
- Josh Klinghoffer - guitar (3)
- Jonathan Hischke - bass (3, 4, 8–10)
- Cate Le Bon - additional vocals (7)
- Josiah Clark Steinbrick (8)
- Eric Gardener - drums (1–6, 10)
- Erica Daking - additional vocals (8)
- Narration compiled by Tim J Price.

== Chart performance ==
Chart (2013)	Peak position
UK Albums (Official Charts)	43
