= Reward (album) =

Studio album by Cate Le Bon
- Released: 24 May 2019
- Genres: Art pop; avant-pop
- Length: 42:43
- Label: Mexican Summer
- Producers: Cate Le Bon; Samur Khouja; Josiah Steinbrick

Cate Le Bon chronology
Crab Day (2016)	Reward (2019)	Pompeii (2022)

Singles from Reward
- 1. "Daylight Matters" Released: 20 March 2019; 2. "Home to You" Released: 16 April 2019; 3. "The Light" Released: 2 May 2019

Reward is the fifth studio album by the Welsh musician Cate Le Bon, released on 24 May 2019 by Mexican Summer.

== Composition ==
Reward dives into "revelatory" art pop and is a "lurid rush" of avant-pop music.

== Critical reception ==
Professional ratings
Aggregate scores
Source	Rating
AnyDecentMusic?	8.2/10
Metacritic	87/100
Review scores
Source	Rating
AllMusic	4.5/5 stars
Exclaim!	8/10
Financial Times	4/5 stars
The Guardian	4/5 stars
Mojo	4/5 stars
Pitchfork	8.4/10
Q	4/5 stars
Rolling Stone	4/5 stars
The Times	4/5 stars
Uncut	9/10

Reward was met with universal acclaim reviews from critics. At Metacritic, which assigns a weighted average rating out of 100 to reviews from mainstream publications, the album received an average score of 87, based on 18 reviews.

== Track listing ==
Reward track listing
No.	Title	Length
1.	"Miami"	5:17
2.	"Daylight Matters"	4:18
3.	"Home to You"	5:27
4.	"Mother's Mother's Magazines"	4:17
5.	"Here It Comes Again"	3:24
6.	"Sad Nudes"	3:08
7.	"The Light"	4:51
8.	"Magnificent Gestures"	5:00
9.	"You Don't Love Me"	3:06
10.	"Meet the Man"	3:55
Total length:		42:43

== Personnel ==
Credits are adapted from the Reward liner notes.

Musicians

- Cate Le Bon – vocals, guitars & synths (all tracks), Mellotron (2), piano (2, 4–6, 10), percussion (3, 5, 7, 8), bass (7, 9)
- Stephen Black – bass (2–6, 8, 9), saxophone (1, 2, 4, 6, 7, 9, 10), clarinet (10)
- Stella Mozgawa – drums (2–5, 7–10), percussion (3–6)
- H. Hawkline – percussive guitar (1), slide guitar (6), guitar (9)
- Samur Khouja – guitar (9)
- Josh Klinghoffer – guitar (3, 4, 8), synth (8)
- Josiah Steinbrick – percussion (4, 6, 8), synths (4, 8, 9)
- Kurt Vile – vocals (8)

Technical

- Cate Le Bon – production (all tracks)
- Samur Khouja – production (all tracks), engineering
- Josiah Steinbrick – production (2–10)
- Stephen Black – additional engineering
- Noah Georgeson – mixing
- Heba Kadry – mastering

Artwork and design

- Phil Collins / Shady Lane Productions – art direction
- Ivana Kličković – photography & styling
- Andrea Bennett, Lisa Breitfeld, and Christian Fritzenwanker – hair & makeup
- H. Hawkline – design and layout

== Charts ==
Chart (2019)	Peak position
Scottish Albums (Official Charts)	32
UK Albums (Official Charts)	86
US Heatseekers Albums (Billboard)	8
US Independent Albums (Billboard)	32
US Top Tastemaker Albums (Billboard)	35
