= Hippo Lite =

Studio album by Drinks
- Released: April 20, 2018
- Genres: Avant-pop; experimental rock; post-punk; psychedelic folk
- Length: 34:39
- Label: Drag City
- Producer: Stephen Black

Drinks chronology
Hermits on Holiday (2015)	Hippo Lite (2018)

Hippo Lite is the second studio album by duo Drinks, which is made up of musicians Cate Le Bon and Tim Presley. It was released on April 20, 2018 through Drag City.

== Composition ==
Musically, Hippo Lite digs its heels into avant-pop and "first-rate" experimental rock, but especially post-punk sounds that range from "abstract [and] harsh" to "quiet" and "playful". Acid folk and freak folk styles have also been seen.

== Critical reception ==
Professional ratings
Aggregate scores
Source	Rating
AnyDecentMusic?	7.0/10
Metacritic	74/100
Review scores
Source	Rating
AllMusic	3.5/5 stars
DIY	4/5 stars
Exclaim!	3/10
The Guardian	4/5 stars
Loud and Quiet	9/10
NME	3/5 stars
The Observer	2/5 stars
Paste	5.9/10
Pitchfork	8.0/10
Tiny Mix Tapes	4/5 marks

Hippo Lite was welcomed with generally positive reviews upon its release. On Metacritic, it holds a score of 74 out of 100, indicating "generally favorable reviews", based on 19 reviews.

Matthew Hogarth for DIY applauded it, noting its "moments of sheer chaotic genius married with brilliant songwriting".

== Track listing ==
Hippo Lite track listing
No.	Title	Length
1.	"Blue from the Dark"	3:02
2.	"If It"	0:40
3.	"Real Outside"	4:27
4.	"When I Was Young"	0:57
5.	"In the Night Kitchen"	2:49
6.	"Greasing Up"	2:50
7.	"Corner Shops"	4:26
8.	"If It (Reprise)"	1:55
9.	"Ducks"	2:43
10.	"Leave the Lights On"	2:46
11.	"Pink or Die"	3:05
12.	"You Could Be Better"	5:00
Total length:		34:39

== Personnel ==
Adapted from AllMusic's Credits page for this record.

DRINKS

- Cate Le Bon
- Tim Presley

Additional musicians

- John Thomas II – drums

Technical

- Stephen Black – engineering
- Samur Khojula – mixing
- JJ Golden – mastering
