= Mohair (band) =

English rock band

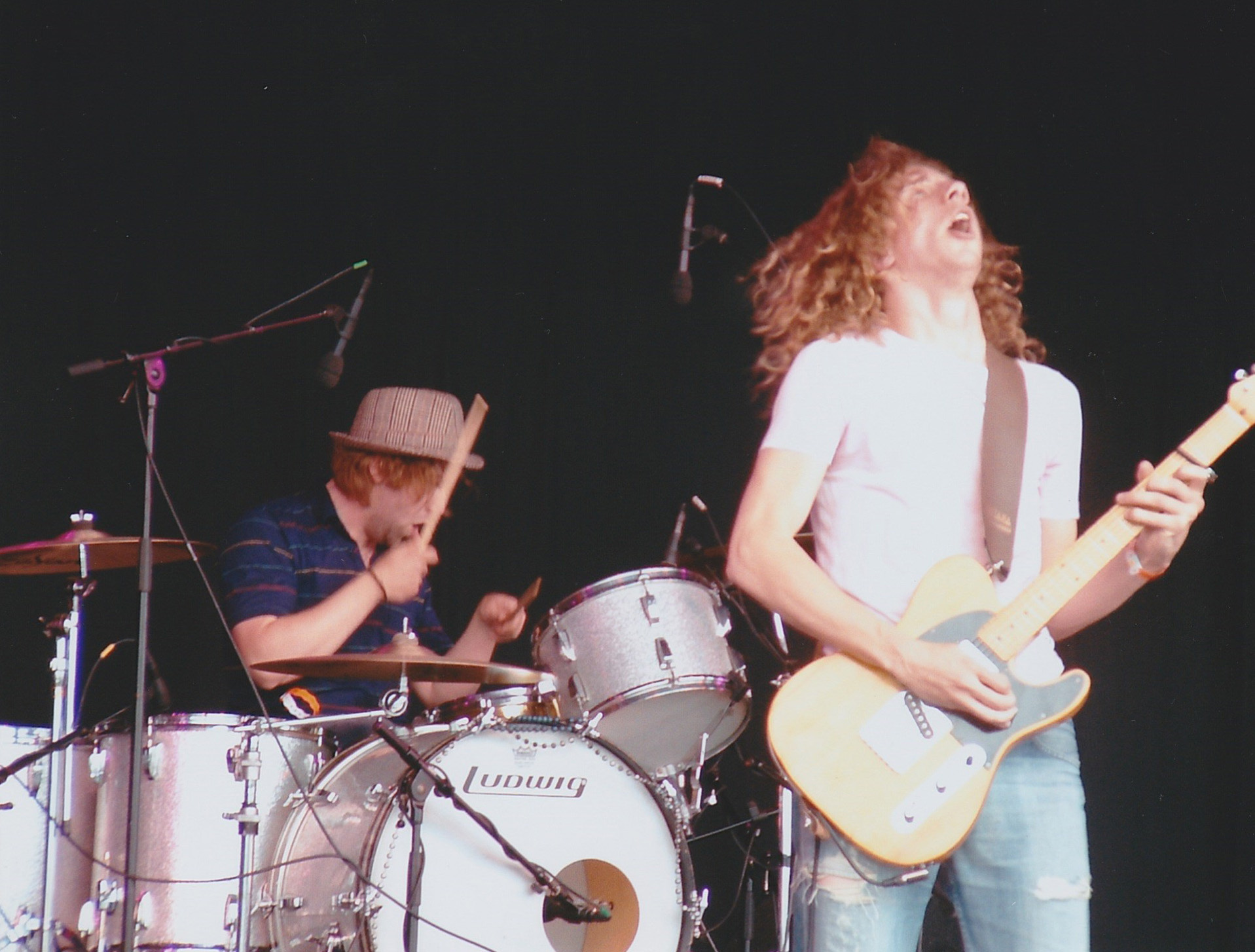
- at Guilfest 2004

Background information
- Origin: Watford, Hertfordshire, England
- Genres: Rock
- Years active: 1998–2007, 2019
- Labels: UK: Ear Candy; US: Grunion
- Members: Pete Baker; Tom Billington; Alex Lee-Richards; Tim Slade

Mohair are an English rock band, formed in 1998 in Watford, Hertfordshire. The band is composed of drummer Pete Baker, vocalist/guitarist Tom Billington, keyboardist Alex Lee-Richards and bassist Tim Slade. The members of Mohair had played in various bands since their early teens.

The band initially split in 2007, but in January 2019 they announced they would be reforming for a one-off show at London's Borderline club in the June of that year.

== Early years ==
Tom Billington is quoted in an early press release about the band's formation:

"We were all in bands, together and separately, from the age of about 12. Pete and I went to the same primary school and he met Tim at 'big' school when they started their first blues band. I had a band with my brother and sister playing covers stuff, while Alex was lurking away the other side of the county playing classical concerts and in the church choir!

Tim joined my band when we were about 15 then Pete came in on trumpet. I met Alex at a musical theatre show we were both involved in a year or so later. This evolved into a 10-piece soul band (doing weddings and the like) until I left school and went traveling in India for a year – where I started to write songs.

When I got back, it was just the 4 of us left. Everyone else had gone to university or got jobs…and that was it really...it all started from there. And that's when we knew there was no other way for us to live."

The band started gigging locally in 1998 as Trooper. By 2001, they had attracted the attention of a small indie label, M1 records and changed their name to Mohair (due to a Canadian band already having the name Trooper).

After signing with M1 Records in October 2001, Mohair spent much of the next 3 years touring throughout the UK. In March 2002 the band made their USA debut with performances at The Cat Club and The Roxy in Los Angeles – and by summer 2004 the band had played over 300 gigs and appeared at many major UK festivals. However, their first 2 'official' single releases (discounting their promo CD "Octopus Chunks") arrived to little fanfare, resulting in the group parting ways with M1 Records in June 2004.

== Small Talk ==
Mohair went on to form their own Ear Candy imprint in 2005, and released singles "End of the Line" and "Stranded (in the Middle of Nowhere)" that year. In spring 2006, Mohair performed several shows at the annual South By Southwest Convention in Austin, Texas, followed by shows in Chicago and New York.

Their debut album, Small Talk (produced by Mark Wallis and Dave Ruffy) was released in the UK on 24 April 2006 on the Ear Candy label, promoted by an appearance on The Album Chart Show on Channel 4 in the UK. The album was received favourably by Allmusic, with Jason MacNeil giving it four stars and calling it "an album that should have a lot of people talking", while Michael Deacon of the Daily Telegraph called the songs "simple and predictable" with "almost teeth-grinding tunefulness". The US version of the album was released on Grunion Records on 19 September 2006 (supported by a 9-week tour of the East coast of America). Upon returning to the UK, Mohair toured as the support act for Boy Kill Boy on their December 2006 UK tour.

In 2007 they supported Razorlight on their February – April 2007 US and UK tours. They also co-headlined with The Holloways on a tour of Germany in May of that year.

== Split ==
On 31 August 2007, Mohair announced that after nine years they were to split up. They played a handful of dates throughout the UK as part of a 'farewell' tour, finishing with a show at The Horn Reborn, St Albans on 28 September 2007. This would be their final show until their 2019 reunion.

== 2007 – 2019 ==
Pete Baker went on to play with Emmy The Great and fellow Watford band The Staves. Baker now plays drums for several acts including Younghusband.

In 2010, Tom Billington recorded his first solo album, Make No Bones, released on 24 May of that year. The follow-up As Luck Would Have It was released on 13 February 2012. He has since gone on to work with Sinead Quinn in country duo Billington & Quinn, as well as spearheading musical charity Electric Umbrella.

Alex Lee-Richards toured with The Bluetones from 2008 to 2018, also playing on their final studio album A New Athens. Along with Andy Lewis, he went on to form the short-lived Acid Jazz project The Red Inspectors. Lee-Richards has gone on to perform and record with Sophie Ellis-Bextor, Joan Armatrading and Indie/Folk outfit In The Forest.

Tim Slade now works as a TV composer and freelance bass player – most notably for Fields Of The Nephilim and Gary Numan. Tim Slade and Pete Baker currently play together in The Bluefingers.

== Reunion ==
In January 2018, Mohair released the limited edition box-set Almost Everything Ever which was a collection of all CD and vinyl releases, together with original photos, setlists and other memorabilia – each package being unique to the recipient. The box-sets sold out in under a week, sparking a renewed interest in the band to the possibility of playing live again.

Mohair reformed for a one-off performance at The Borderline, London on 14 June 2019. Regarding the reunion, Tom Billington was quoted: "We went through a lot together but we've all been through so much more since. Children, marriages, near death experiences….it's going to be amazing to see what that adds up to when we play together again."

The band followed their sold-out reunion in London with a 'homecoming' show at O'Neill's, Watford on 19 December 2019.

Since 2020, Billington and Lee-Richards have performed as an acoustic duo version of Mohair.

== Discography ==
=== Studio albums ===
Year	Title	Tracks
April 2006	Small Talk (UK Release) Ear Candy Records	1. Talk of the Town; 2. Life; 3. End of the Line; 4. Disarray; 5. Stranded; 6. Little Voice; 7. Everything I Want; 8. Thin Air; 9. Keep It Together; 10. L.A. Song
August 2006	Small Talk Remastered (Digital Release) Available through iTunes UK	1. Talk of the Town; 2. Life; 3. End of the Line; 4. Disarray; 5. Stranded; 6. Little Voice; 7. Everything I Want; 8. Thin Air; 9. Keep It Together; 10. L.A. Song
September 2006	Small Talk (US Release) Grunion Records	1. Talk of the Town; 2. Stranded; 3. End of the Line; 4. Little Voice; 5. Thin Air; 6. Keep It Together; 7. Disarray; 8. L.A. Song; 9. Ella May; 10. Life
November 2006	Small Talk Remastered (CD Version) Ear Candy Records	1. Talk of the Town; 2. Life; 3. End of the Line; 4. Disarray; 5. Stranded; 6. Little Voice; 7. Everything I Want; 8. Thin Air; 9. Keep It Together; 10. L.A. Song

=== Singles ===
Year	Title	Notes	UK Chart
2002	Octopus Chunks (Beautiful in Alcohol)	Released on M1 Records. CD Tracks; 1. Octopus Chunks (Beautiful in Alcohol); 2. Kansas City $1.09; 3. Bombshell; 4. Thin Air	–
2003	Superstar	Released on M1 Records. CD Tracks; 1. Superstar; 2. True Light Colours; 3. Kansas City $1.09 (Demo)	#156
2004	Brown Eyes Blue	Released on M1 Records. Also available on 7" vinyl. CD Tracks; 1. Brown Eyes Blue; 2. Something to Remember; 3. Getaway Car Vinyl Tracks; 1. Brown Eyes Blue; 2. Something to Remember	#79
2005	Keep It Together	Released on TBA Records. CD Tracks; 1. Keep It Together; 2. Time Goes So Fast	#143
2005	Stranded (in the Middle of Nowhere)	Released on Ear Candy Records. CD Tracks; 1. Stranded (in the Middle of Nowhere); 2. Everything I Want	–
2005	End of the Line	Released on Ear Candy Records. Available in 2 CD formats and on 7" vinyl. CD 1 / Vinyl Tracks; 1. End of the Line; 2. Ella May CD 2 Tracks; 1. End of the Line; 2. Talk of the Town	#52
2006	Life	Released on Ear Candy Records. Also available on 7" vinyl. CD / Vinyl Tracks; 1. Life; 2. Broken Pieces	#113
2006	Everything I Want / Little Voice	Released on Ear Candy Records. Only available on 7" vinyl. Vinyl Tracks; 1. Everything I Want; 2. Little Voice	–
2006	Stranded (in the Middle of Nowhere)	US release via iTunes. Used in commercial for Beck's beer.	–
2007	Talk of the Town	Released on Ear Candy Records. Only available on 7" vinyl. Vinyl Tracks; 1. Talk of the Town; 2. No One Gets the Better of Me	–
