= Mug Museum =

Studio album by Cate Le Bon
- Released: 12 November 2013
- Recorded: March 2013
- Studios: Seahorse Sound Studios (Los Angeles, California)
- Genres: Indie rock; folk rock; psychedelic rock
- Length: 42:09
- Labels: Turnstile; Wichita
- Producers: Noah Georgeson, Josiah Steinbrick

Cate Le Bon chronology
Cyrk (2012)	Mug Museum (2013)	Crab Day (2016)

Singles from Mug Museum
- 1. "I Think I Knew" Released: 28 August 2013; 2. "Are You with Me Now?" Released: 10 September 2013

Mug Museum is the third studio album by the Welsh musician Cate Le Bon, released on 12 November 2013 by Turnstile Music and Wichita Recordings. It was produced by Noah Georgeson and Josiah Steinbrick and was recorded in Los Angeles shortly after Le Bon had relocated there from Wales. The album was generally praised by critics for its understated musical arrangements and lyrical content based on the theme of relationships, which was partially inspired by the recent death of Le Bon's grandmother. The track "I Think I Knew" features a duet between Le Bon and Perfume Genius.

== Composition and recording ==
Mug Museum was recorded in Los Angeles in March 2013, shortly after Le Bon had relocated there from Wales. The album was produced by Noah Georgeson, known for his work with Joanna Newsom and Devendra Banhart, and Josiah Steinbrick. Le Bon's collaboration with Georgeson led to a more spare, stripped-down style compared to her previous work: "We realised that everything was sounding so good that there was this unwritten rule that things have to really deserve their place on the track to warrant being there." Le Bon's other collaborators on the album included H. Hawkline, Sweet Baboo, Nick Murray, and Seattle recording artist Perfume Genius performing guest vocals on "I Think I Knew".

Le Bon described Mug Museum as a reaction to the recent death of her grandmother, stating "rather than it being a grief laden album it is more about what someone at the top of the female chain leaves behind and how there's a palpable shift in every relationship. I suppose when you start meditating on any relationship then others naturally fall into the fold. The Mug Museum is an imaginary place where relationships are looked at and thought upon." The title phrase "mug museum" was coined by a former roommate in reference to the accumulation of teacups in Le Bon's bedroom.

== Critical reception ==
Professional ratings
Aggregate scores
Source	Rating
Metacritic	77/100
Review scores
Source	Rating
AllMusic	3.5/5 stars
Consequence of Sound	D−
NME	(8/10)
Pitchfork Media	(7.3/10)
PopMatters	(7/10)

Mug Museum received a positive response from music critics. At Metacritic, which assigns a normalized rating out of 100 to reviews from mainstream critics, the album received an average score of 77 based on 22 reviews, indicating a "generally favorable" reception. Bob Boilen, the host of NPR's All Songs Considered, compared the album to the work of Nico and Television and wrote that "it's already become one of my new best friends". He later listed Mug Museum as one of his Top 20 albums of 2013.

Writing for NME, Ben Hewitt called the album "wonderfully weird" and praised the stripped-down musical arrangements as well as Le Bon's songwriting. Jeremy Larson of Pitchfork expressed similar sentiments, describing "small, graceful songs with deceptive amounts of depth". He also praised Le Bon's vocal performance, writing "Sometimes she sounds like the shyest member of a folksy sylvan choir and other times she rears up and belts out a high soprano note at the climax of 'Duke.'" Brian Josephs of Consequence of Sound gave the album a negative review, writing that "Mug Museum lacks any sort of emotional dialogue with the listener".

== Track listing ==
All tracks are written by Cate Le Bon.

Mug Museum track listing
No.	Title	Length
1.	"I Can't Help You"	4:00
2.	"Are You with Me Now?"	4:20
3.	"Duke"	3:49
4.	"No God"	4:38
5.	"I Think I Knew"	4:48
6.	"Wild"	3:28
7.	"Sisters"	4:05
8.	"Mirror Me"	3:48
9.	"Cuckoo Through the Walls"	5:29
10.	"Mug Museum"	3:44
Total length:		42:09

== Personnel ==
Credits are adapted from the Mug Museum liner notes.

Musicians

- Cate Le Bon – vocals; guitar; percussion; piano; synthesizer; saxophone
- H. Hawkline – bass; guitar; organ
- Sweet Baboo – bass; clarinet; saxophone
- Nick Murray – drums
- Josiah Steinbrick – guitar; organ; percussion
- Perfume Genius – vocals
- Toko Yasuda – vocals

Production and artwork

- Noah Georgeson – producer; mixing
- Josiah Steinbrick – producer
- Samur Khouja – engineer
- Alex DeGroot – assistant engineer
- H. Hawkline – sleeve design
- Piper Ferguson – cover photo
