= Gig theatre =

Form of theatre

Gig theatre is a term used to describe a form of theatre that combines dramatic storytelling with the conventions of a live music performance. The form emerged in the United Kingdom during the early 21st century and is characterised by actor-musicians, minimal touring equipment such as microphones, amplifiers and drum kits, and performance styles that blur the distinction between theatre and concerts.

== Origins ==
The earliest documented use of the term gig theatre is attributed to the Irish playwright and performer Donal O'Kelly, who used it to describe his play The Hand, presented at the 2002 Dublin Festival. Writing in the Irish Independent, Brian Lavery described O'Kelly's concept as an attempt to "eliminate the boring parts of regular drama" by using music to create a closer relationship between performers and audiences.

According to theatre scholar Duška Radosavljević, the term subsequently fell out of use for almost a decade before re-emerging in discussions of theatre at the Edinburgh Festival Fringe.

== Development ==
By 2016, gig theatre was an emerging trend in British theatre. Writing in The Stage, Holly Williams cited productions including Beats (2012), Torycore (2013), My Beautiful Black Dog (2015) and Weekend Rockstars (2015) as representative examples of the form, and identified Latitude Festival as an important platform for the development of gig theatre.

Writing in The Skinny, Amy Taylor described the relaxed relationship between performers and audiences as one of the defining characteristics of gig theatre.

Although the term came to be widely used by critics and journalists, not all theatre-makers whose works were described as gig theatre adopted the label themselves. By 2018, however, the Hull-based company Middle Child had embraced the designation, stating that it sought to "push the boundaries of what gig theatre can do".

In a 2019 essay for The Theatre Times, Radosavljević argued that gig theatre had become one of the defining trends of the Edinburgh Festival Fringe, highlighting productions including The Canary and the Crow and Parakeet while linking the form to accessibility, audience diversity and the touring model of Paines Plough's Roundabout venue.

== Characteristics ==
Theatre journalists Holly Williams and Amy Taylor identified audience participation, collaboration between musicians and theatre-makers, and a relaxed relationship between performers and audiences as defining characteristics of gig theatre.

Radosavljević additionally includes the use of code-switching in performance by actor-musicians, portable staging, and the influence of the UK festival circuit as characteristics. She argues that the form developed partly through the UK's festival circuit and partly in response to changing patterns of theatre production and audience engagement.

In her book Theatre Aurality, Lynne Kendrick considers gig theatre a form of postdramatic theatre.

== Examples ==
Examples of gig theatre productions include Kieran Hurley's Beats (2012), Kae Tempest's Brand New Ancients (2012), Lucy Ellinson, Chris Thorpe and Steve Lawson's Torycore (2013), Brigitte Aphrodite's My Beautiful Black Dog (2015), Middle Child's Weekend Rockstars (2015), Sabrina Mahfouz's With a Little Bit of Luck (2016), Karine Polwart's Wind Resistance (2016), Luke Barnes and Middle Child's All We Ever Wanted Was Everything (2017), and Arinzé Kene's Misty (2018).

International examples include Lola Arias's Minefield (2016), Aris Biniaris's Hill 731 (2019), and Christopher Rüping's Dionysos Stadt (2018), which Radosavljević argues demonstrate that theatre combining dramatic storytelling with live music has emerged independently in a range of cultural contexts outside the United Kingdom, although not necessarily under the label "gig theatre".

In 2026, American theatre-maker Whitney White wrote, directed and composed All Is But Fantasy, a two-part production presented by the Royal Shakespeare Company, described as "two high-energy gig-theatre performances" reimagining four of Shakespeare's best-known characters through live music and performance.
