= H. Hawkline =

Welsh musician

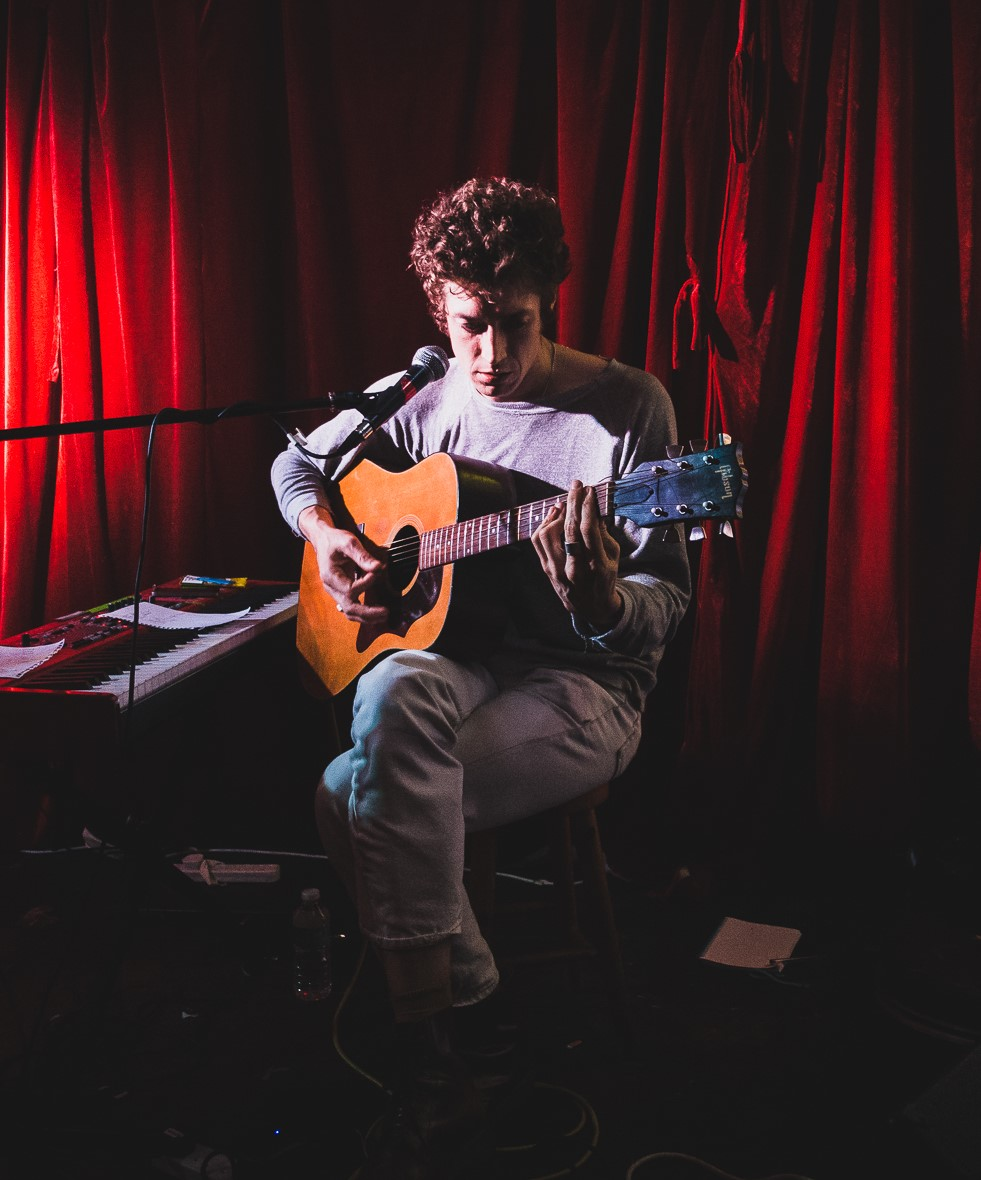

Background information
- Born: Huw Gwynfryn Evans; 15 March 1985 (age 41); Cardiff, Wales
- Genres: Indie folk; indie rock; lo-fi; psychedelic rock
- Occupations: Musician; graphic designer
- Instruments: Vocals; guitar; bass guitar
- Labels: Shape; Trash Aesthetics; Turnstile; Heavenly Recordings
- Website: hhawkline.org

Huw Evans (born 15 March 1985), also known as H. Hawkline, is a Welsh singer-songwriter and radio and television presenter based in Cardiff. He also lived and worked in Los Angeles for several years. He performs in both English and Welsh. His stage name is taken from Richard Brautigan's book The Hawkline Monster: A Gothic Western.

== Life and career ==
Evans was born in Cardiff and lived in Prestatyn in north-east Wales from the age of 10 until returning to Cardiff at 18. He is the son of TV and radio presenter Hywel Gwynfryn and his wife Anja (who died in 2018) and has four siblings. He also has two half-siblings from his father's first marriage.

Prior to becoming a full-time musician, Evans presented the S4C music show Bandit with Huw Stephens up to the show's cancellation at the end of 2011. He also presented a weekly radio show on the C2 evening slot on BBC Radio Cymru until summer 2012. In December 2015 he temporarily returned to the station to present a Thursday-night show.

H. Hawkline's debut release, the album A Cup of Salt, was put out in 2010 by the then-Cardiff-based label Shape Records. His second album, The Strange Uses of Ox Gall, was released by the same label in 2011.

He supported Gruff Rhys on tour in 2010 in the UK and Ireland.

Following UK festival gigs and touring, in 2012 H. Hawkline released a new EP, Black Domino Box, on the Trash Aesthetics label. His Ghouls EP was released in 2013 by Turnstile Records. The same year his songs Cric Yn Y Cymylau and Llenwi appeared on the "Y Record Las" compilation, the second release from the Cardiff label Recordiau Lliwgar.

In 2013, H. Hawkline moved to Los Angeles with his then-partner Cate Le Bon, and there the two continue to collaborate musically. Stateside, they've also played with White Fence (Tim Presley).

In August 2014, H. Hawkline was signed to Heavenly Recordings. The label released a free compilation of some of his previous work titled Salt Gall Box Ghouls. His debut album of new material for the label, In the Pink of Condition, was released in February 2015. It was produced by Cate Le Bon. In September 2015, the album was nominated for the 2014-2015 Welsh Music Prize.

Evans regularly plays guitar or bass guitar in Cate Le Bon and Sweet Baboo's live bands and records. His own live band has previously also featured Guto Pryce on bass and Andy Fung on drums. Hawkline also played bass on Kevin Morby's albums Harlem River and Still Life. As a solo artist, he supported Foxygen on their 2015 European tour.

In 2017, H. Hawkline supported Devendra Banhart on tour in the US and Europe/UK, followed by a European support slot with Aldous Harding, whom he also played with during her headline set.

His next album I Romanticize was released in June 2017 on Heavenly. It was recorded in LA and in Narberth in west Wales.

Evans also continues to perform as part of ex-partner Aldous Harding's band, and appeared on her 2019 album Designer playing bass, guitar and keyboards. In 2026, again, he is "heavily feature[d]" on her album Train on the Island.

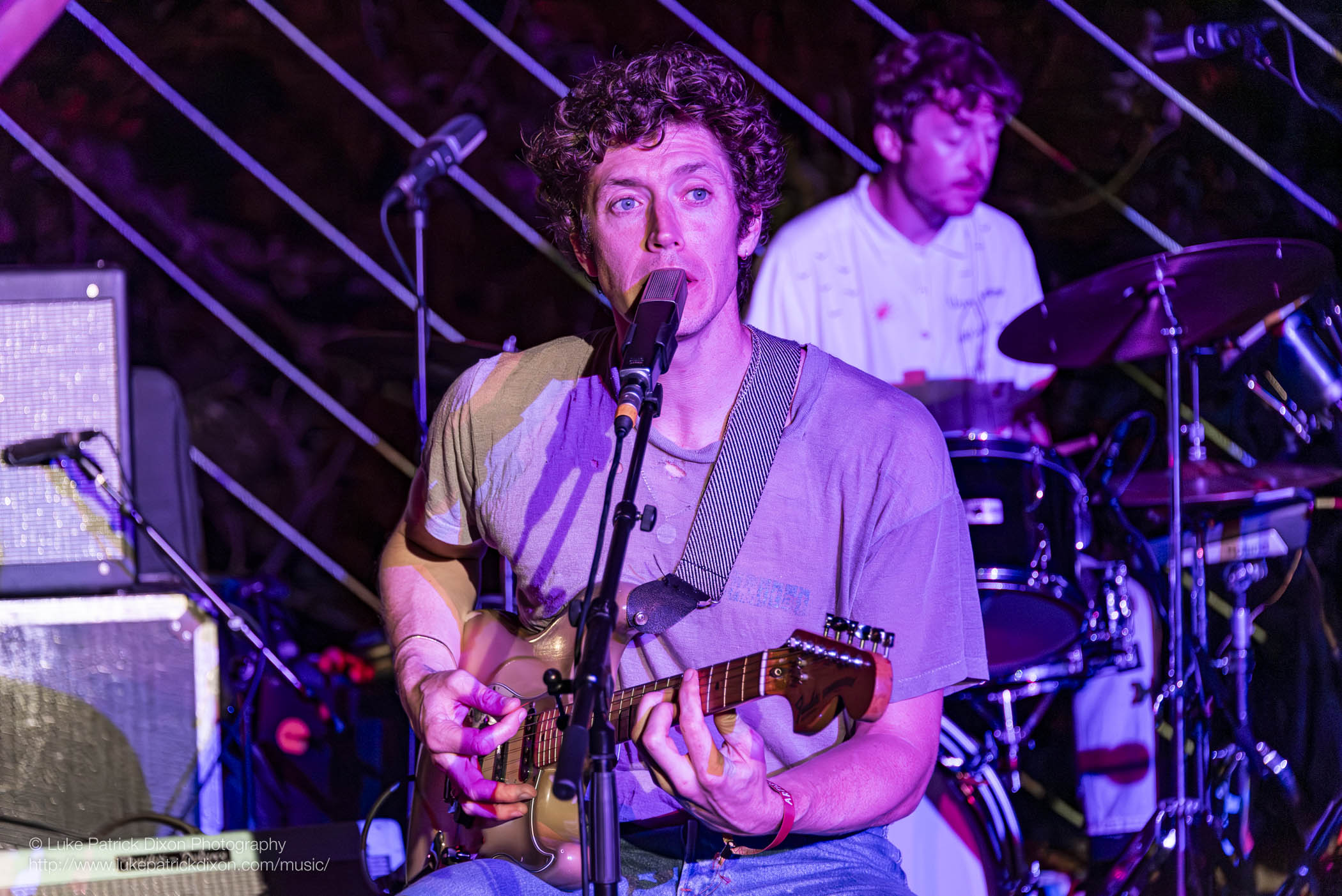
H. Hawkline performing at End of the Road Festival in 2023

In November 2022, Evans announced his fifth studio album, Milk for Flowers (Heavenly Recordings), with the title track released as the first single from it. The album came out in March 2023. It was produced by Cate Le Bon and mixed by Patrik Berger, and features Tim Presley and John Parish alongside Steve Black (various instruments), Euan Hinshelwood (saxophone), Paul Jones (piano) and Davey Newington (drums).

== Graphic design ==
Evans is also a graphic designer. In addition to designing all his own albums, he has designed releases by Cate Le Bon (Me Oh My, Cyrk, Cyrk II, Mug Museum, Crab Day, Reward and Michelangelo Dying), Kevin Morby (reverse sleeve for Harlem River), Aldous Harding, Teenage Fanclub and Bitw. He also created designs for Gruff Rhys's Ara Deg festival.

== Discography ==
=== Solo albums ===
- A Cup of Salt (December 2010, Shape Records)
- The Strange Uses of Ox Gall (September 2011, Shape Records)
- In the Pink of Condition (February 2015, Heavenly Recordings)
- I Romanticize (June 2017, Heavenly Recordings)
- Milk for Flowers (March 2023, Heavenly Recordings)

=== EPs ===
- You Say You Love Me (split 7-inch with My Sad Captains, 2011, Trash Aesthetics)
- Black Domino Box (August 2012, Trash Aesthetics)
- Ghouls (June 2013, Turnstile)
- Last Thing On Your Mind (June 2017, Heavenly Recordings)

=== Compilations ===
- Y Record Las (two songs, April 2013, Recordiau Lliwgar)
- Salt Gall Box Ghouls (best-of, August 2014, Heavenly Recordings)
