= Penboyr =

Hamlet in Carmarthenshire, Wales

Coordinates: 52.00167°N 4.39667°W

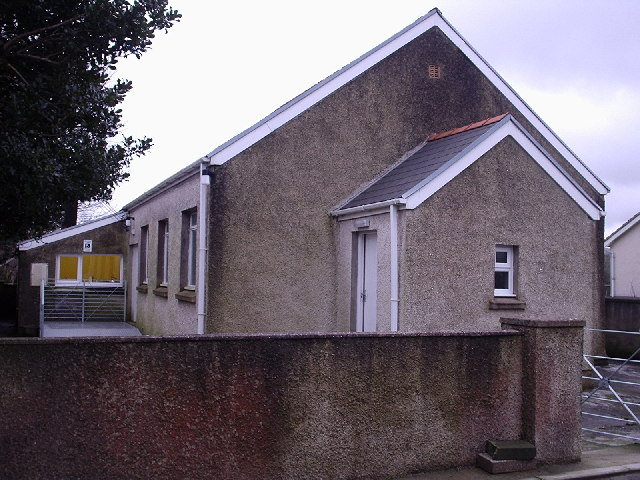
- Penboyr Church Hall

- Location within Carmarthenshire
- Population: 70 Unknown
- OS grid reference: SN353364
- Community: Llangeler
- Principal area: Carmarthenshire
- Preserved county: Dyfed
- Country: Wales
- Sovereign state: United Kingdom
- Post town: LLANDYSUL
- Postcode district: SA44
- Dialling code: 01559
- Police: Dyfed-Powys
- Fire: Mid and West Wales
- Ambulance: Welsh
- UK Parliament: Caerfyrddin
- Senedd Cymru – Welsh Parliament: Carmarthen East and Dinefwr

Penboyr is a hamlet in the county of Carmarthenshire, Wales consisting of a number of houses, smallholdings, farms and a church.

== About ==
"This is a small area within modern Carmarthenshire consisting of regular rectangular fields and dispersed farms. It lies within the medieval Cantref Emlyn, in Emlyn Uwch-Cych commote. Cantref Emlyn had been partly brought under Anglo-Norman control in c.1100 when Emlyn Is-Cych commote to the west was reconstituted as the Lordship of Cilgerran. Numerous castles were established in Uwch-Cych comote - none of which has any recorded history - but the commote was back under Welsh control by the 1130s, where it remained throughout the 12th and early 13th centuries. A motte-and-bailey castle, ‘Tomen Llawddog’, was established within this character area, immediately next to Penboyr parish church, St Llawddog's; and therefore the may be contemporary. It is not known whether they belong to the brief period of Anglo-Norman control, or are Welsh foundations of the later 12th century. However, the church dedication to St Llawddog may be later medieval, when his cult was still active in the area. The church was first recorded in 1222 when it was ‘restored’ to the Bishops of St Davids, to be counter-claimed by the crown. Its early parish status, along with its close relationship to the castle, suggests that the two represent a deliberate Anglo-Norman plantation. They may therefore represent the site of a failed vill. The castle, which has no recorded history, probably become disused at an early date. They never became the focus for any later settlement, nucleated or otherwise. "

== Historical references ==
=== A Topographical Dictionary of Wales (S. Lewis, 1844) ===
"Penboyr (PEN-BOYR), a parish, in the union of Newcastle-Emlyn, higher division of the hundred of Elvet, county of Carmarthen, South Wales, 4 miles (S.E.) from Newcastle-Emlyn; containing 1375 inhabitants. This parish, which is situated in the north-western part of the county . . . contains a large tract of arable and pasture land, inclosed and cultivated, the whole comprising 5600 acres, of which 3000 are arable, 2000 meadow or pasture, and 600 wood. The surface is hilly, in some parts mountainous, and in others picturesque . . . the crops chiefly consisting of wheat, barley, and oats; the prevailing timber is oak and ash. . . The church, dedicated to St. Llawddog, a very ancient building in a dilapidated state, was taken down and rebuilt from the ground, in 1809 . . . There is a chapel of ease in the parish, called Trinity Chapel in which service is performed . . . About 60 children are educated in a day school, at the expense of their parents; and two Sunday schools, one in connexion with the Established Church, and the other with Calvinistic Methodists, afford instruction to about 120 males and females. The churchyard is supposed to occupy part of the site of a Roman camp; a pot of Roman coins was found in the neighbourhood, not many years ago, and part of an ancient road and other traces of Roman occupation have been found in the parish. . . " [From A Topographical Dictionary of Wales (S. Lewis, 1844).]

=== Imperial Gazetteer of England and Wales (J. M. Wilson, 1870-72) ===
"Penboyr, a parish in Newcastle-in-Emlyn district, and county of Carmarthen; near the Sarn-Helen way, 4 miles S W of Llandyssil r. station, and 4 S E of Newcastle-in-Emlyn. Post-town, Newcastle-in-Emlyn, under Carmarthen. Acres, 6, 876. Real property, £3, 285. Pop.in 1851, 1, 271; in 1861, 1, 146. Houses, 263. The property is much subdivided. There are many tumuli. The living is a rectory, united with the chapelry of Trinity, in the Diocese of St Davids. Value, £325.* Patron, Earl Cawdor. The old church stands near a Roman camp, where coins have been found; and a new church, in the early English style, was built in 1864."

== Notable people ==
- Griffith Jones (1684–1761), Church of England minister, promoted Methodism and spread literacy in Wales
- Cate Le Bon (born 1983), a Welsh musician and record producer, born Cate Timothy
