= Bandit (TV series) =

Welsh language music television show

- Genre: Music video
- Presented by: Huw Stephens; Elis James; Sarra Elgan; Huw Evans; Rhydian Bowen Phillips
- Country of origin: Wales
- Original language: Welsh

Production
- Production company: Boomerang (Wales)

Original release
- Network: S4C
- Release: 2001 – 2011

Bandit was a Welsh-language music television show on S4C, produced by Boomerang Plus. It included live performances, videos and interviews and was presented by Huw Stephens, Huw Evans, Elis James, Sarra Elgan, and Rhydian Bowen Phillips. The programme aimed to raise the profile of Welsh-language popular music but also included music from Wales with lyrics in other languages (usually English). The last episode of Bandit was broadcast on 28 December 2011, after a decade of being on the air. The special show was presented by Stephens and Evans.

The Bandit team also used to organise several gigs each year and the show was considered to be S4C's flagship music programme. Their multiple nominations for BAFTA Cymru awards each year demonstrated the programme's appeal. One of their BAFTAs was won for "Best Title Sequence/Best Motion Graphics".
