= Ape in Pink Marble =

Studio album by Devendra Banhart
- Released: September 23, 2016
- Genre: Indie folk
- Length: 43:46
- Label: Nonesuch/Warner Bros.
- Producers: Devendra Banhart, Noah Georgeson, Josiah Steinbrick

Devendra Banhart chronology
| Mala (2013) | Ape in Pink Marble (2016) | Ma (2019) |

Singles from Ape in Pink Marble
- 1. "Middle Names" Released: 2016; 2. "Saturday Night" Released: 2016

Ape in Pink Marble is the ninth studio album by folk rock musician Devendra Banhart, released on September 23, 2016, on Nonesuch Records. The album was written, produced, arranged, and recorded in Los Angeles by the singer/songwriter/guitarist with his longtime collaborators Noah Georgeson and Josiah Steinbrick, both of whom also worked on Banhart's previous album, Mala (2013).

== Background ==
The record was finished in early May 2016. A couple of weeks after that, Banhart posted on Instagram that the album's recording and mixing was done. The album was announced on June 24, 2016, along with the first track, 'Middle Names', the opening track of the album.

== Critical reception ==
Professional ratings
Review scores
| Source | Rating |
|---|---|
| AllMusic | 4/5 stars |
| Pitchfork | 6.6/10 |
| The Line of Best Fit | 7/10 |
| Under the Radar | 8/10 |
| Drowned in Sound | 7/10 |

Ape in Pink Marble received a generally positive reception from music critics. At Metacritic, which assigns a "weighted average" score to ratings and reviews from selected mainstream critics, the Metascore is 78, which is based on 14 critical reviews.

Marcy Donelson from AllMusic stated, "The album's overall effect is one of strolling along a seaside path, maybe with a stray dog and a straw hat, in a less-frequented village somewhere far from home, and it's one of Banhart's most satisfying."

== Track listing ==
| No. | Title | Length |
|---|---|---|
| 1. | "Middle Names" | 3:28 |
| 2. | "Good Time Charlie" | 2:06 |
| 3. | "Jon Lends a Hand" | 2:33 |
| 4. | "Mara" | 3:13 |
| 5. | "Fancy Man" | 2:29 |
| 6. | "Fig in Leather" | 3:13 |
| 7. | "Theme for a Taiwanese Woman in Lime Green" | 4:23 |
| 8. | "Souvenirs" | 2:59 |
| 9. | "Mourner's Dance" | 3:18 |
| 10. | "Saturday Night" | 4:23 |
| 11. | "Linda" | 5:56 |
| 12. | "Lucky" | 2:49 |
| 13. | "Celebration" | 2:56 |
| Total length: | | 43:46 |

== Charts ==
| Chart (2016) | Peak position |
|---|---|
| Belgian Albums (Ultratop Flanders) | 73 |
| Belgian Albums (Ultratop Wallonia) | 43 |
| French Albums (SNEP) | 22 |
| Portuguese Albums (AFP) | 31 |
| US Americana/Folk Albums (Billboard) | 20 |
| US Heatseekers Albums (Billboard) | 18 |
