= Mala (Devendra Banhart album) =

Studio album by Devendra Banhart
- Released: March 12, 2013
- Genres: Electropop; folk; indie folk; alternative rock; pop; psychedelic; folktronica
- Length: 40:52
- Label: Nonesuch/Warner Bros.
- Producers: Devendra Banhart, Noah Georgeson

Devendra Banhart chronology
What Will We Be (2009)	Mala (2013)	Ape In Pink Marble (2016)

Mala is the eighth studio album by American folk rock musician Devendra Banhart, released on March 12, 2013, on Nonesuch Records. The album was produced by Banhart and Noah Georgeson, and mastered by Greg Calbi.

== Background ==
Mala was produced by Banhart and Noah Georgeson, and mastered by Greg Calbi. Banhart's band members Noah Georgeson, Greg Rogove, Josiah Steinbrick, and Rodrigo Amarante helped him on the record.

== Music and lyrics ==
Fred Thomas of AllMusic wrote that "instead of the overreaching, overly long confusion of previous efforts, Mala streamlines Banhart's multifaceted muse, and the songs all fit together, if in a somewhat roundabout manner." Thomas also noted that "apart from the increased cohesion, the quality of the songwriting is far higher, reminding us of the astonishing promise and tossed-off ease of Banhart's early material, and suggesting that his detours into less exciting sounds were just part of a journey that might be much longer and more rewarding than expected." Consequence of Sound's Dan Pfleegor noted that "although softer and a touch more dour than some of his previous offerings, proves that Banhart is still a strange fella leaving his mark on the world of popular music." At Mojo David Sheppard noticed how "Mala meanders liquidly between warbled, DIY electronic pop [...] with diversions into hazy instrumental miniatures [...] intimate, wraithlike ballads". So, Q's James Oldham told that "where previously it might have seemed ridiculous to talk about Banhart alongside Syd Barrett and Nick Drake, Mala finally makes those comparisons feel comfortable." But John Everhart at Under the Radar noted how it would be "a disservice to compare Banhart to anyone", and he found Mala to be "yet another stylistic curveball, favoring low-key arrangements with subtle flourishes of Tropicalia, and disco even. It's also his best album in nearly a decade." At The A.V. Club, Michael Gallucci writes that "Mala expands Banhart's sonic template in less organic ways, adding pinches of electronic spice here, recording on an old-school hip-hop tape machine there. It's not an uncomplicated listen (Banhart's records never are), but Mala breezes through its 14 songs with relative unfussiness." At PopMatters, Zachary Houle noted that "Mala is generally a soft, meditative album full of gently strummed acoustic guitar (and the odd keyboard) that flutters as the chords and notes waft on by", and told that "Mala could easily be categorized as easy listening music, the kind of inoffensive stuff you could almost play for your grandparents".

However, Andy Gill of The Independent wrote that the album is "not bad, just unnecessary", and this is because "it shifts desultorily from style to style, with songs barely hanging around long enough to state their case." On the other hand, Andrew Burgess of musicOMH is in disagreement with that sentiment because he told that in the realm of musicality "Mala has a cohesive sound accentuated by a powerful, thumping low end and washing (but not overpowering) analogue synths." In addition, Burgess noted the album is quite "subdued", and carrying "laid-back tunes unlike anything Banhart has done before." At Rolling Stone, Joe Gross noted that "Banhart seems to grab at anything that would get him out of the freak-folk box; Mala is smoother in its amalgamation, drifty melodies and his classic mumble recorded with gorgeously low-fi-sounding muffle." The Guardian's Kate Mossman felt that Banhart "no longer sounds particularly freaky [...] it's perfectly normal to record on vintage hip-hop equipment". Yet, Luke Grundy of The Line of Best Fit told that Mala is "another exercise in genre cross-pollination encompassing both broad musical brush-strokes and nuanced, vulnerable whisper-like tracks." On the flipside, Paste magazine's Ryan Reed felt otherwise writing that "Mala is just as quiet as his Will Be—but unlike that album, this one never drags." At Spin, Andy Beta told that "lyrically, he still shades toward the surreal". Drowned in Sound's Aaron Lavery noted how Mala was made "with a definite DIY sensibility." Zachary Houle of PopMatters felt that "Mala a bit of a puzzling release, one that might get listeners wondering what was going on in the artist's mind when he pulled this thing together", and said that "if there's one thing Mala doesn't do, is cohere."

== Critical reception ==
Professional ratings
Review scores
Source	Rating
AllMusic	3.5/5 stars
Consequence of Sound	4/5 stars
The Guardian	4/5 stars
The Independent	2/5 stars
The Line of Best Fit	6/10 stars
Mojo	4/5 stars
MusicOMH	3.5/5 stars
Now	3/5 stars
Q	4/5 stars
Rolling Stone	3.5/5 stars
Slant Magazine	3.5/5 stars
Under the Radar	8/10 stars
Pitchfork	(7.6/10)

Mala has received generally positive reception from music critics. At Metacritic, they assign a "weighted average" score to ratings and reviews from selected mainstream critics, and the Metascore is a 72, which is based on 29 critic reviews. At AnyDecentMusic?, they have a rating of a 7.0-out-of-ten for the album, and this is based on 27 critic reviews.

Consequence of Sound's Dan Pfleegor told that the album "may not stand as the zenith of the man's catalogue, but it's a highlight worth exploring and a dreamy journey for the taking." At Mojo, David Sheppard noted that this release "finds the madcap minstrel at large in an opaque, lo-fi sonic milieu of wheezy synths, grainy drum boxes, ethereal riffs and nylon-string guitar flourishes," and he called "all of it, framing 14 pocket-battleship songs which, fidelity notwithstanding, are among the most immediate he's recorded." Kate Mossman of The Guardian evoked that "If he opted to waft round the world for the next three years only to return with another quiet little triumph like this, it would be perfectly acceptable." At Q, James Oldham found that "the oddity remains then, but endearingly so", and yet he proclaimed that "this is a beautiful album that counterpoints Banhart's boundless and surreal imagination against a newly-discovered depth and sincerity", which he wrote that it is "surprising and enthralling, and it won't make you want to kill hippies."

At Uncut, Fiona Sturges rated the album an 8-out-of-ten, and called the release "a thrillingly inventive blend of alt.rock, fingerpicking folk, Latin flavours and [...] new this [...] electronic pop". John Everhart at Under the Radar proclaimed that Banhart is "a singularly idiosyncratic and brilliant songwriter, one hitting an arresting stride on this uniformly superb album." At Filter, Kyle MacKinnel rated the album an 84%, and found that the release "has been curbed to the point of what feels like a cohesive body of work.". Ian Cohen rated the album a 7.6-out-of-ten from Pitchfork, and felt that "Mala is Banhart's best record in nearly a decade [...] largely because it's his loosest and funniest." At The A.V. Club, Michael Gallucci graded the album a B, and heard nothing "crowded or convoluted", which "there's plenty of laid-back cool in Mala's grooves", and this album has "a freaky situation all around." Ryan Reed rated the album a 7.2-out-of-ten of Paste, wrote that the effort is "often easier to admire fondly than truly love, particularly when the maestro leans closest to his freak-folk roots", and noted that "for all its occasional backward glancing, Mala still feels beautifully in-the-moment."

Fred Thomas of AllMusic felt that the release "doesn't quite return to the lo-fi brilliance of his beginnings or continue the overwrought leanings of his most previous work, but somehow finds a way to refreshingly split the difference." Andrew Burgess of musicOMH called it a "grown-up album", which is a "satisfying, mystifying, well-imagined album", and found that the release "takes you by the hand and assures you that wherever we're going, you just might not ever want to go back home." At Rolling Stone, Joe Gross noted that all the artist needed was "a little time off" to come up with a collection like this one. Slant Magazine's Annie Galvin highlighted that "Mala attests to a discipline that was absent in Banhart's recent, loopier ventures, proving that his eccentric songwriting works best when harnessed in service of good storytelling." At Spin, Andy Beta rated the album a 7-out-of-ten, and affirmed that the effort "is a more gratifying listen than the oft-grating Banhart had any right to deliver to non-believers in 2013. Tidy and concise, clocking in at 43 minutes, it favors the diminutive gesture to the cloying, hammy affectation that derailed so much of his prior discography."

However, Max Mertens at Now told that this "isn't his most groundbreaking work, but he's earned the right to relax, and there are far worse albums you could spend a lazy Sunday afternoon with." The Line of Best Fit's Luke Grundy found that "there are moments to savour, but for each of these there's at least one frustrating or disappointing moment to counteract it." At NME, Emily Mackay rated the album a 6-out-of-ten, and called it "a nightmarish listen, but in a good way." Aaron Lavery of Drowned in Sound rated the album a 6-out-of-ten, and wrote that "almost everything here is pretty good when you sit down and concentrate on it, but there little that jumps up and demands your attention." At The Independent, Andy Gill was critical of "Devendra Banhart's last few albums [that] left little impression, and despite moving to Warners' artists colony Nonesuch, his latest seems unlikely to arrest that trajectory." PopMatters' Zachary Houle rated the album a 5-out-of-ten, and told that "with equal amounts killer and filler doled out, Mala is a cake that comes across as half-baked, which is sorrowful knowing that Banhart really wanted to have that cake and eat it, too."

== Track listing ==
All tracks are written by Devendra Banhart except for "Won't You Come Over", which he co-wrote with Noah Georgeson.

No.	Title	Length
1.	"Golden Girls"	1:35
2.	"Daniel"	3:05
3.	"Für Hildegard von Bingen"	2:36
4.	"Never Seen Such Good Things"	3:13
5.	"Mi Negrita"	3:24
6.	"Your Fine Petting Duck"	5:46
7.	"The Ballad of Keenan Milton"	2:16
8.	"A Gain"	1:35
9.	"Won't You Come Over"	3:37
10.	"Cristobal Risquez"	2:28
11.	"Hatchet Wound"	3:10
12.	"Mala"	1:08
13.	"Won't You Come Home"	3:31
14.	"Taurobolium"	3:16
Total length:		40:52

Bonus 7" vinyl tracks
No.	Title	Length
15.	"Something French"
16.	"Loring Baker"

== Chart performance ==
Chart (2013)	Peak position
Belgian Albums (Ultratop Flanders)	96
Belgian Albums (Ultratop Wallonia)	107
French Albums (SNEP)	77
Swiss Albums (Schweizer Hitparade)	82
UK Albums (Official Charts)	143
US Billboard 200	139
US Top Alternative Albums (Billboard)	25
US Americana/Folk Albums (Billboard)	7
US Heatseekers Albums (Billboard)	2
US Top Rock Albums (Billboard)	36
US Indie Store Album Sales (Billboard)	13
