= In the Pink of Condition =

Studio album by H. Hawkline
- Released: 3 February 2015
- Length: 38:28
- Label: Heavenly Recordings
- Producer: Cate Le Bon

H. Hawkline chronology
The Strange Uses of Ox Gall (2011)	In the Pink of Condition (2015)	I Romanticize (2017)

Professional ratings
Aggregate scores
Source	Rating
Metacritic	82/100
Review scores
Source	Rating
AllMusic	4/5 stars
Drowned in Sound	7/10
The Guardian	4/5 stars

In the Pink of Condition is the third studio album by Welsh musician H. Hawkline. It was released on 3 February 2015 under Heavenly Recordings.

The album was nominated for the 2014-2015 Welsh Music Prize.

== Critical reception ==
In the Pink of Condition was met with "universal acclaim" reviews from critics. At Metacritic, which assigns a weighted average rating out of 100 to reviews from mainstream publications, this release received an average score of 82, based on 6 reviews.

== Track listing ==
In the Pink of Condition track listing
No.	Title	Length
1.	"Sticky Slithers"	3:09
2.	"Isobelle"	3:29
3.	"Everybody's On the Line"	3:56
4.	"Moons In My Mirror"	3:10
5.	"Rainy Summer"	3:32
6.	"Concrete Coloured Clothes"	2:38
7.	"Ringfinger"	2:36
8.	"Dirty Dreams"	2:46
9.	"In Love"	3:58
10.	"Moddion"	1:54
11.	"Spooky Dog"	3:55
12.	"Back In Town"	3:25
