= Crab Day =

Studio album by Cate Le Bon
- Released: 15 April 2016
- Studios: Panoramic House (Stinson Beach, California)
- Genres: Neo-psychedelia; indie pop; art pop
- Length: 36:38
- Labels: Drag City; Turnstile; Caroline International
- Producers: Josiah Steinbrick; Noah Georgeson

Cate Le Bon chronology
Mug Museum (2013)	Crab Day (2016)	Reward (2019)

Singles from Crab Day
- 1. "Wonderful" Released: 29 February 2016

Crab Day is the fourth studio album by the Welsh musician Cate Le Bon, released on 15 April 2016 by Drag City, Turnstile Music, and Caroline International. It was produced by Josiah Steinbrick and Noah Georgeson and recorded at Panoramic House, a hilltop mansion in the coastal town of Stinson Beach, California. The artist Phil Collins created a short film set in Berlin to coincide with the release.

== Recording ==
After the experience working with American musician Tim Presley as DRINKS, Le Bon changed her working method. She created short demos and used different instruments. Lyrics were written after the music had been completed. She described the process as "the songs were mapped out in my head and I had vocal melodies, just not lyrics". When the songs had been developed, they were rehearsed over five days together with Stephen Black (bass), H. Hawkline (guitar) and Stella Mozgawa (drums). Upon entering the studio, recording was completed over five days after which Le Bon completed her vocals and overdubs. It was followed by the process of selecting the songs and running order for the album.

== Critical reception ==
Professional ratings
Aggregate scores
Source	Rating
Metacritic	75/100
Review scores
Source	Rating
AllMusic	3.5/5 stars
Consequence of Sound	B−
DIY	4/5 stars
Drowned in Sound	7/10
The Guardian	4/5 stars
MusicOMH	3.5/5 stars
The New York Times	(favorable)
NME	3/5
Pitchfork	8.1/10
Under the Radar	7/10

Crab Day received positive reviews from contemporary music critics. At Metacritic, which assigns a normalized rating out of 100 to reviews from mainstream critics, the album received an average score of 75, based on 21 reviews, which indicates "generally favorable reviews".

Laura Snapes of Pitchfork Media gave the album a favorable review, stating, "Crab Day is a voyage into doubt led by a queasy compass, and a ringleader who's prepared to stake out uncertain territory. Le Bon always keeps you guessing, making the old traditions of guitar-oriented rock feel arbitrary, too. Her nervy assessments of the world are filled with equal parts suspense and heart, and beautifully zany riffs, where the feeling of being frayed by uncertainty comes together into a strangely comforting patchwork."

=== Accolade ===
Publication	Accolade	Year	Rank
Rough Trade	Albums of the Year	2016	89

== Track listing ==
All tracks are written by Cate Le Bon.

Crab Day track listing
No.	Title	Length
1.	"Crab Day"	3:51
2.	"Love Is Not Love"	3:03
3.	"Wonderful"	2:38
4.	"Find Me"	2:53
5.	"I'm a Dirty Attic"	3:08
6.	"I Was Born on the Wrong Day"	2:19
7.	"We Might Revolve"	3:49
8.	"Yellow Blinds, Cream Shadows"	4:04
9.	"How Do You Know?"	3:27
10.	"What's Not Mine"	7:26
Total length:		36:38

== Personnel ==
Credits adapted from the liner notes of Crab Day.

Musicians

- Cate Le Bon – guitar, piano (1, 2, 6), percussion (6, 9, 10), synthesizer (4, 5, 7), marimba (3, 8)
- Josiah Steinbrick – bass (6), piano (3, 10), percussion (6, 9)
- Stephen Black – bass (1–5, 7–10), clarinet (1, 8, 10), saxophone (2–4, 6–10)
- H. Hawkline – guitar (1–3, 6, 9, 10), marimba (7, 10), synthesizer (4, 10)
- Stella Mozgawa – drums (1–5, 7–10)

Production and artwork

- Josiah Steinbrick – production
- Noah Georgeson – production, mixing
- Samur Khouja – engineering
- JJ Golden – mastering
- Isabel Vollrath – kimono jacket
- Christian Fritzenwanker – make up
- Ivana Klickovic – cover photography, insert photography
- H. Hawkline – sleeve
