= Stainless Style =

Studio album by Neon Neon
- Released: 17 March 2008 (UK); 18 March 2008 (U.S.)
- Genre: Pop, electronica, hip hop
- Length: 42:58
- Label: Lex Records

Neon Neon chronology
Stainless Style (2008)	Praxis Makes Perfect (2013)

Singles from Stainless Style
- 1. "Trick for Treat" Released: 25 June 2007; 2. "Raquel" Released: 19 November 2007; 3. "I Lust U" Released: 24 March 2008

Professional ratings
Review scores
Source	Rating
AllMusic	4.5/5 stars
Drowned in Sound	(7/10)
The Guardian	4/5 stars
Hot Press	(9/10)
MusicOMH	4/5 stars
The Observer	4/5 stars
Pitchfork	(7.7/10)
Uncut	4/5 stars

Stainless Style is the debut album from Neon Neon—a project from Super Furry Animals front man Gruff Rhys and electronic artist Boom Bip—which was released in March 2008 via Lex Records. The album was streamed in its entirety on the band's Myspace page for one week before its physical release.

Stainless Style is a loose concept album based on the tumultuous life of DeLorean Motor Company founder John DeLorean, and features a number of high-profile guest appearances from Fab Moretti of The Strokes, Har Mar Superstar, Yo Majesty, Spank Rock, Cate Le Bon and Fatlip. The album was nominated for the 2008 Mercury Music Prize.

== Background ==
According to Rhys, he and Boom Bip (real name Bryan Hollon) had been working together on various projects before they finally came up with Neon Neon. In an interview with Sam Richards, Rhys stated:

We've been touring and recording together occasionally for around six years. Early in 2006 Boom Bip contacted me about coming to LA to make a bonkers disco record. I was on the next flight.

Rhys and Boom Bip had also previously collaborated on "Do's & Don'ts" from the latter's 2005 album Blue Eyed in the Red Room.

== Production ==
Recording for the album began in London in August 2006, and it was gradually mixed and finished over the course of the following year in London and Los Angeles. According to the band, the primary goal was to make something entirely different from their previous work. "It had to be something completely outside of ourselves," said Hollon. Rhys adds that although the duo were trying to make something different, "we didn't realize we were going to make a mid-'80s synth-pop record. That was never part of the plan."

In order to recreate this mid-'80s synthpop sound, the band relied on keyboards such as the Casio SK-5, miniKORG 700 and Roland SH-101, as well as Casio drum pads and sticks and a 1964 Silvertone Jupiter guitar. Concerning the album's production Hollon said

We wanted the tracks to sound like a new version of something familiar but also hit hard on a sound system, so it was a careful process of making sure some sounds were full and warm while others were thin and ping-y. For guitars, we mostly recorded those direct into an Eventide chorus [effects pedal]. There wasn't any reason to have an amp color the sound. It just needed to be thin, with the chorus dominating the sound.

== Concept album ==
Stainless Style is a concept album based on the tumultuous life of playboy car designer John DeLorean. In an interview with Marc Hogan, Rhys described it as

The Neon Neon album is a full-on concept record about the wives and lives ... Of John DeLorean, so it's been a real pleasure to write about a specific subject, and to think about various scenarios relating to his life and imaginary scenarios that may have happened to him on the way. And so musically we've been writing in a style that personally mirrored his kind of fast, cocktail-driven lifestyle. ... It's a very frivolous electro-pop record about the first playboy engineer.

The album's title is a pun on stainless steel, deriving from the fact that the only car produced by the DeLorean Motor Company—the DeLorean—was distinctive by the fact that its body was fiberglass with a stainless steel veneer. DeLorean also began selling "D=MC2" stainless steel watches for $3,495 each on the internet in 2000. The song "Raquel" is based upon tales of an affair DeLorean allegedly had with actress Raquel Welch in the mid-'70s, and mentions many true-life biographical details about Welch, such as her Bolivian father and Irish mother, her birth in "north Chicago", and education and upbringing in California. The song is sung from DeLorean's perspective, as he delivers lines to Welch such as "I saw you as a movie star, but now you're riding in my car." According to Rhys, "I Lust U" recounts "a dark period in DeLorean's life when he was having lots of affairs", while "Michael Douglas" describes the time when DeLorean "redesigned his own chin while sitting at pool parties in LA with Michael Douglas."

== Track listing ==
All tracks are written by B. Hollon and G. Rhys; Except where indicated.

No.	Title	Writer(s)	Length
1.	"Neon Theme"	B. Hollon, Marty Sataman	2:20
2.	"Dream Cars"		3:24
3.	"I Told Her on Alderaan"		3:41
4.	"Raquel"		5:01
5.	"Trick for Treat" (feat. Spank Rock & Har Mar Superstar)	B. Hollon, G. Rhys, N. Juwan	4:42
6.	"Steel Your Girl"	B. Hollon, G. Rhys, J. Klinghoffer	3:32
7.	"I Lust U" (feat. Cate Le Bon)		2:56
8.	"Sweat Shop" (feat. Yo Majesty)	B. Hollon, G. Rhys, L. Flowers, W. Baynham, R. Burt	3:56
9.	"Belfast"		3:08
10.	"Michael Douglas"		4:12
11.	"Luxury Pool" (feat. Fatlip)	B. Hollon, G. Rhys, D. Stewart	3:53
12.	"Stainless Style"		2:01

== Personnel ==
Musicians

- Bryan Hollon - performer (all tracks)
- Marty Sataman - performer (1)
- Gruff Rhys - performer (all tracks except 1)
- Fab Moretti - drums (2)
- Shay - additional backing vocals (3), additional vocals (5)
- Spank Rock - performer (5)
- Har Mar Superstar - performer (5)
- N. Juwan - performer (5), additional vocals (5)
- Sean Tillmann - additional vocals (5, 8)
- Josh Klinghoffer - performer (6), guitar (6), bass (6), drums (6)
- Cate Le Bon - performer (7), additional vocals (7)
- Sylvia G - additional vocals (7)
- Yo Majesty - performer (8)
- Jwl B - additional vocals (8)
- Shon B - additional vocals (8)
- Shunda K - additional vocals (8)
- Fatlip - performer (11), additional vocals (11)
- Angela Gannon - additional vocals (12)
- Michele Stodart - additional vocals (12)
- Romeo Stodart - additional vocals (12)

Technical

- Boom Bip - producer (all tracks except 6)
- Max Dingle - engineer (2 to 4, 7 to 12)
- Danny Kalb - engineer (2, 4)
- Kris Jenkins - engineer (2)
- Adam Samuels - engineer (6)
- Todd Monfalcone - engineer (6)
- Sir Douglas Styles - engineer (7)
- Adam Tilzer - assistant engineer (2)
- Boom Bip - mixing (1)
- Chris Shaw - mixing (2 to 4, 6, 7, 9, 10)
- Danny Kalb - mixing (4, 5, 8, 11, 12)
- Guy Davie - mastering
- Tom Brown - A&R
- Will Skeaping - A&R
- David Rodrick and Kevin Gasser - Boom Bip management
- Alun Llwyd - Gruff Rhys management

== Chart performance ==
Chart (2008)	Peak position
UK Albums (OCC)	67
