= Cate Le Bon =

Welsh musician, songwriter and record producer

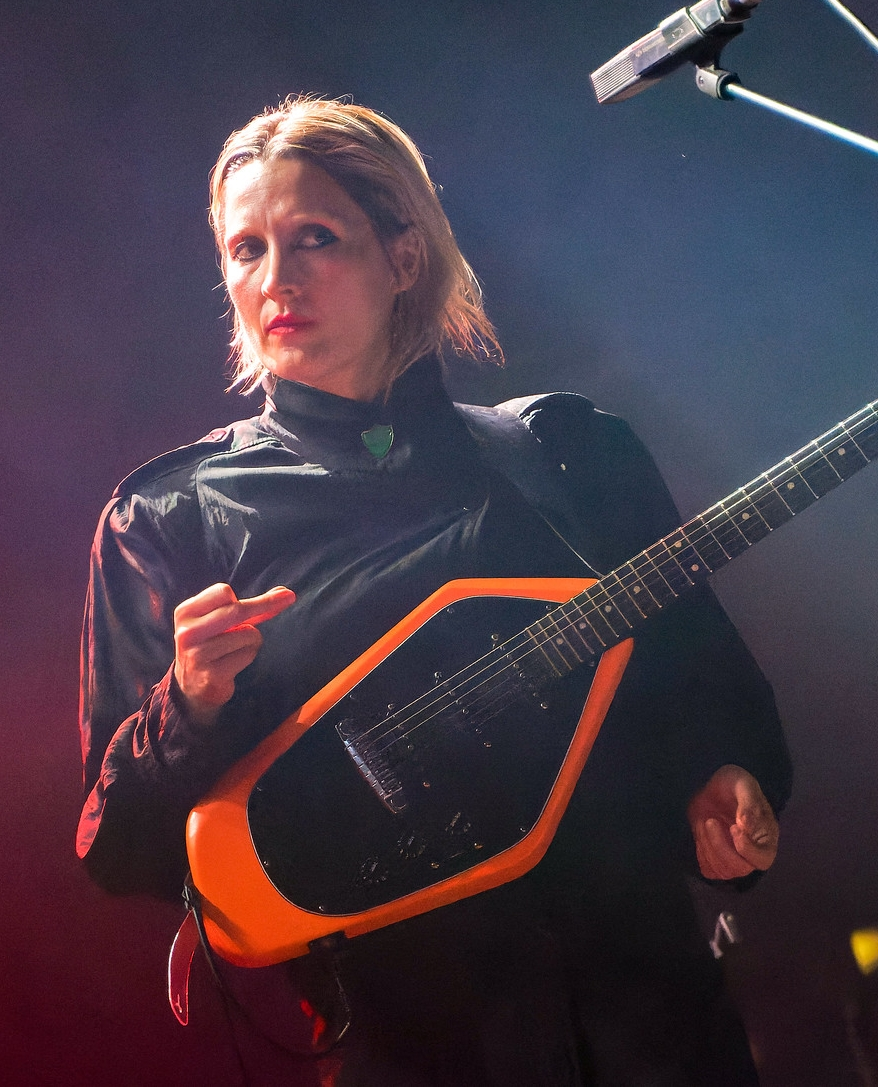
- Le Bon performing at the Roundhouse in London, 2022

Background information
- Born: Cate Timothy; 4 March 1983 (age 43); Penboyr, Carmarthenshire, Wales
- Genres: Folk; indie rock; baroque pop
- Occupations: Musician; songwriter; record producer
- Instruments: Vocals; guitar
- Years active: 2007–present
- Labels: Turnstile; The Control Group; Irony Bored; Drag City; Mexican Summer; Peski
- Member of: Drinks
- Website: catelebon.com

Cate Le Bon (born Cate Timothy; 4 March 1983) is a Welsh singer, songwriter and record producer. She sings in both English and Welsh. She has released seven solo studio albums, and was one half of the experimental music duo Drinks (stylised in all caps) with her then-partner Tim Presley.

As a record producer, Le Bon has produced albums by Deerhunter, Wilco, John Grant, Dry Cleaning, Horsegirl, Devendra Banhart and Kurt Vile, amongst others.

== Career ==
=== 2007–2012: Early career, Me Oh My and Cyrk ===
Le Bon first gained public attention when she supported Gruff Rhys (of the Super Furry Animals) on his 2007 solo UK tour. She appeared as a guest vocalist on Neon Neon's 2008 single "I Lust U" from their album Stainless Style. Under her original name she provided backing vocals on Richard James's debut solo album The Seven Sleepers Den in 2006. She also appeared on his second solo album, We Went Riding, from 2010.

Her first official release was a Welsh language EP, Edrych yn Llygaid Ceffyl Benthyg ("Looking in the Eyes of a Borrowed Horse", similar to the English expression "to look a gift horse in the mouth"), on Peski Records in 2008. She also self-released the double A-side debut single "No One Can Drag Me Down" / "Disappear" (described by Gruff Rhys as "Bobbie Gentry and Nico fight over a Casio keyboard; melody wins!") on her website. Le Bon worked alongside Gorky's Zygotic Mynci's Megan Childs, who contributed violin, and Super Furry Animals and Thrills collaborator John Thomas, who added pedal steel.

Her debut album Me Oh My was released in 2009, followed by Cyrk and the Cyrk II EP in 2012.

=== 2013–2017: Mug Museum and Crab Day ===
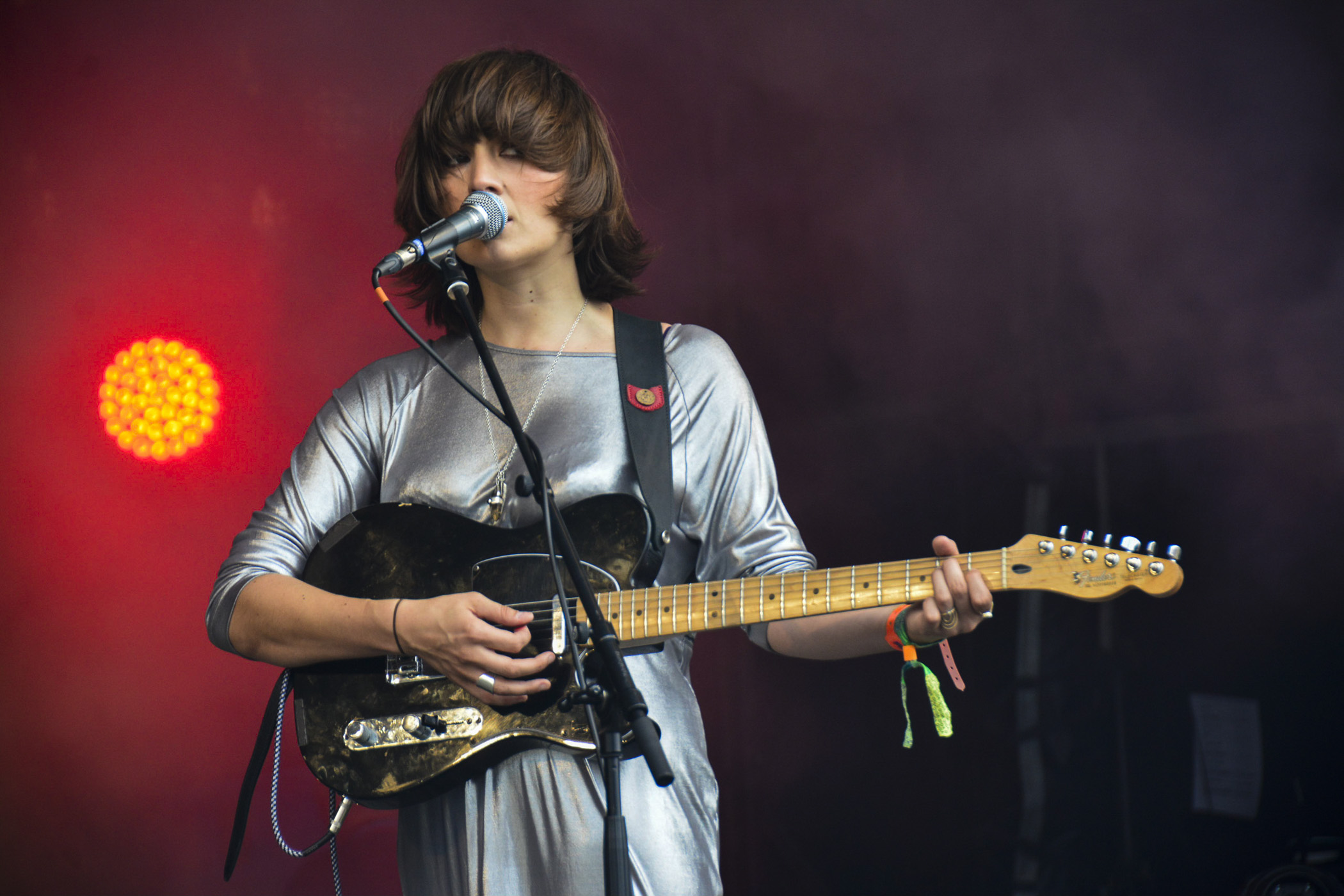
Cate le Bon performing at Glastonbury Festival in 2014

In January 2013, Le Bon moved to Los Angeles to further her career in the US. Her third album, Mug Museum, was released November 2013. It was produced by Noah Georgeson and Josiah Steinbrick in Los Angeles, and featured Stephen Black (bass) and Huw Evans (guitar). During that year, she provided guest vocals on two albums: the track "Slow Train" from Kevin Morby's debut album Harlem River and "4 Lonely Roads" from Manic Street Preachers's album Rewind the Film.

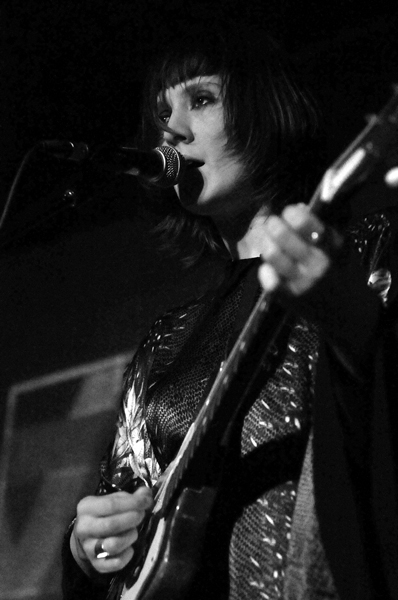
Le Bon performing at The Arch, Village Underground, London on 23 April 2012

In 2015, Le Bon collaborated with Tim Presley as DRINKS and released the album Hermits on Holiday in August 2015. DRINKS released their second album Hippo Lite in April 2018.

Le Bon released her fourth studio album, Crab Day, on 15 April 2016 on Drag City to generally favourable reviews. The album was produced by Josiah Steinbrick and Noah Georgeson, and again featured Stephen Black (bass) and Huw Evans (guitar), with Stella Mozgawa (drums). She noted how the collaboration with Presley had made her realise "that I make music because I love to, not because I have to". On tour she was supported by Black and Evans and on occasion by Steinbrick and Josh Klinghoffer, a five-piece that also performs instrumental improvisations under the name BANANA.

In January 2017, Le Bon released the four-track EP Rock Pool via Drag City. It includes her version of the track "I Just Want to Be Good" which she wrote for Sweet Baboo's 2015 album The Boombox Ballads. In the same month Leaving Records released Live by BANANA, recorded live during the band's 2016 tour and Le Bon remixed Eleanor Friedberger's song "Are We Good?" from the album Rebound (2018).

=== 2018–2022: Reward and Pompeii ===
In 2018, Le Bon signed with Brooklyn based record label Mexican Summer. That same year, she joined John Cale onstage at the Barbican Centre with the London Contemporary Orchestra.

Le Bon released her fifth studio album, Reward, via Mexican Summer on 24 May 2019. Reward was nominated for the Mercury Prize. It was followed by her sixth full-length studio album, Pompeii, on 4 February 2022, again via Mexican Summer. Le Bon began working on Pompeii during the first wave of the COVID-19 pandemic in Wales.

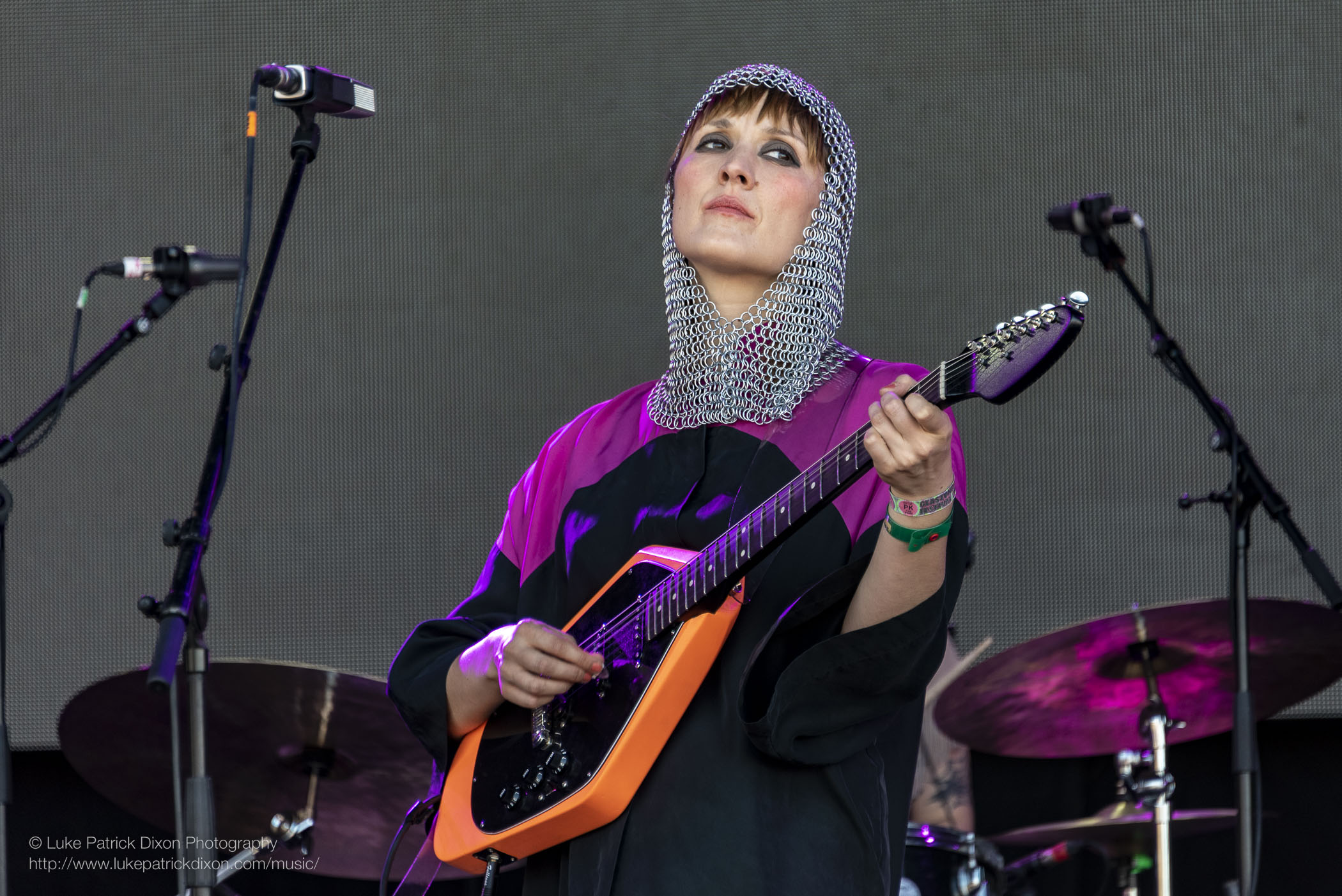
Cate le Bon performing at Glastonbury Festival in 2022

=== 2023–present: Production work and Michelangelo Dying ===
In 2024 she appeared on St. Vincent's album All Born Screaming. She plays bass on two songs, and is credited with additional production on four songs. In the summer of 2025, Le Bon produced Secret Love, the third studio album by Dry Cleaning. The album was subsequently released in January 2026 to widespread critical acclaim.

Le Bon's seventh solo album, Michelangelo Dying, was released in September 2025 to critical acclaim. The album was influenced by her break-up with longtime partner Tim Presley. In January 2026, Le Bon released a stand-alone single from the same sessions, "Always the Same", featuring St. Vincent. Le Bon stated: "[The song] needed a little more elbow room than the album would allow but it is cousin to the song cycle of Michelangelo Dying, coming into formation in the same breath. [It is] special to me because it features dear friend and mighty artist St. Vincent who occupies the space around me with composure and gravitas whilst I kick around in the dirty waters of love."

== Personal life ==
Le Bon was born Cate Timothy on 4 March 1983 in Penboyr, Carmarthenshire, Wales. Her parents were council workers who met at the University of Newcastle, and soon moved into a farmhouse in Penboyr, where they eventually raised their three daughters. Her stage name is a tribute to English musician Simon Le Bon.

Le Bon had previously lived with her DRINKS collaborator and partner Tim Presley in Joshua Tree, California. She had also lived in Cardiff and Los Angeles.

== Critical reception ==
In her review of Crab Day, critic Laura Snapes described Le Bon as "a ringleader who's prepared to stake out uncertain territory. Le Bon always keeps you guessing, making the old traditions of guitar-oriented rock feel arbitrary, too. Her nervy assessments of the world are filled with equal parts suspense and heart, and beautifully zany riffs, where the feeling of being frayed by uncertainty comes together into a strangely comforting patchwork."

In an interview with Pitchfork, Jeff Tweedy of Wilco, speaking of Mug Museum, stated that Le Bon was "one of the best out there making music now." Describing her sound, he said "it's really rare for people to have a specific sound anymore, but I can always tell when it's her playing guitar. Whenever I try to figure out her guitar parts, they’re way harder than they sound."

After "obsessively" listening to Michelangelo Dying, Rumaan Alam wrote in The New Yorker that Le Bon's "prophetic" quality evokes Laurie Anderson and her acclaimed Big Science album. He also compared her to David Bowie, Bjork, Kate Bush and Brian Eno.

== Backing band ==
Current members

- Stephen "Sweet Baboo" Black – guitar, saxophone, percussion, various instruments (2009–present), bass guitar (2009–2022)
- Dylan Hadley – drums, backing vocals (2019–present)
- Toko Yasuda - bass guitar, backing vocals (2022–present)
- Euan Hinshelwood - saxophone, guitar (2022–present)
- Paul Jones – piano, keyboards (2025–present)

Former members

- H. Hawkline – guitar, backing vocals, various instruments (2008–2016)
- Nick Murray – drums (2013–2017)
- Josh Klinghoffer – guitar (2016)
- Stella Mozgawa – drums (2016)
- John Thomas – guitar, keyboards, synths (2016–2019)
- Josiah Steinbrick – keyboards, percussion, various instruments (2016–2019)
- Daniel Wood – drums (2019)
- Alex Morrison – keyboards, guitar (2022–2023)

== Discography ==
Solo albums

- Me Oh My (Irony Bored, 2009)
- Cyrk (The Control Group, 2012)
- Mug Museum (Turnstile / Wichita, 2013)
- Crab Day (Turnstile / Drag City, 2016)
- Reward (Mexican Summer, 2019)
- Pompeii (Mexican Summer, 2022)
- Michelangelo Dying (Mexican Summer, 2025)

with DRINKS

- Hermits on Holiday (Heavenly Recordings, 2015)
- Hippo Lite (Drag City, 2018)

=== Selected production discography ===
- H. Hawkline – In the Pink of Condition (2015)
- Alex Dingley – Beat the Babble (2016)
- Tim Presley – The WiNK (2016)
- H. Hawkline – I Romantasize (2017)
- Josiah Steinbrick – Meeting of Waters (2018)
- Deerhunter – Why Hasn't Everything Already Disappeared? (2019, co-producer)
- John Grant – Boy from Michigan (2021)
- H. Hawkline – Milk for Flowers (2022)
- Kurt Vile – "Jesus on a Wire" (2022)
- Devendra Banhart – "Flying Wig" (2023)
- Wilco – Cousin (2023)
- A. Savage – Several Songs About Fire (2023)
- Kurt Vile – Back to Moon Beach (2023)
- Horsegirl – Phonetics On and On (2025)
- Dry Cleaning – Secret Love (2026)
