= The Theatre Times =

The Theatre Times (TTT) is an online theatre portal that launched in November 2016.

The Theatre Times has thirty-two thematic sections, more than 140 Regional Managing Editors, and over sixty media partners around the world. It covers theatre in more than 90 countries, with performance reviews and interviews, as well as essays and news stories. It has covered stories about theatre and artificial intelligence, theatre and decolonization, the aesthetics of truth, LGBTQ theatre, puppetry, dystopian drama, and war/post-war productions, for example in Tehran, Ukraine, or Syria.

The Theatre Times hosts Performap, a digital map of global theatre and performance festivals, which was funded through Yale Digital Humanities Lab and LMDA Innovation Grant, and the International Online Theatre Festival (IOTF), an annual or bi-annual theatre streaming event. Since 2019, The Theatre Times and Digital Theatre+ have collaborated on the IOTF. In 2023, IOTF partnered with the European Theatre Convention and Sustainable Theatre Alliance for a Green Environmental Shift (STAGES).

In 2017, A Theatre & Performance Studies Podcast called The Theatre Times a "heroic project". Theatre Journal called it "the globally influential." A review at OnStageBlog called IOTF "the kaleidoscope and catalyst for global change," stating:

The fervor, innovation, and conversations exhibited through the festival's global works should act as a beacon as we navigate forward; storytelling has and always will be a catalyst for community catharsis no matter the variance in subject matter or location. By bringing together different voices and perspectives in a digital sphere, The International Online Theatre Festival is a paradigm example of how the theatre community worldwide should and can continue using virtual platforms, streaming, archives, and sharing to foster discussion, magnification, and empathy across emotional and physical borders in a twenty-first-century world. – Natalie Rine, OnStageBlog

Since 2018, The Theatre Times has been led by its Executive Directors Magda Romanska and Kasia Lech. The former is Professor of Theatre at Emerson College in Boston, MA, and Researcher at metaLAB at Harvard University. The latter is Associate Professor of Global Performance History at the University of Amsterdam in the Netherlands and an Affiliate at metaLAB.

== Awards ==
- 2018 Elliott Hayes Award for Outstanding Achievement in Dramaturgy
- 2021 The Culture Online International Award for “Best Online Project” for the International Online Theatre Festival (Second Place).
- 2024 ATHE-ASTR Award for Excellence in Digital Scholarship from the Association for Theatre in Higher Education and the American Society for Theatre Research
- 2025 LIT Advertising Awards – Gold Medal in the category Website/Entertainment
- 2025 MUSE Creative Award – Silver Winner in the Digital Publication Category
- 2025 The Webby Honoree in the Cultural Blog/Website category in the 29th Annual Webby Awards (chosen from nearly 13,000 entries).
