= Cyrk (album) =

Studio album by Cate Le Bon
- Released: 17 January 2012
- Genres: Art pop; Neo-psychedelia
- Length: 35:09
- Label: Amplify Music
- Producer: Krissie Jenkins

Cate Le Bon chronology
Me Oh My (2009)	Cyrk (2012)	Mug Museum (2013)

Cyrk is the second studio album by Welsh singer and producer Cate Le Bon. It was released in 2012 by Amplify Music.

== Background and recording ==
Le Bon found inspiration for her second album from the Isle of Eigg, located in the Inner Hebrides. In particular, Le Bon found inspiration in the sea, wildlife, and matters of the heart. Le Bon described the album as a "time travel travelogue", and as having lighter lyrics than her previous album, Me Oh My.

Le Bon rehearsed the songs of Cyrk in the Welsh mountains with a tight-knit band. She noted that her approach to song-writing changed from that of Me Oh My, saying: "When I wrote the songs for CYRK, I had been touring Me Oh My with a live band for quite some time and started to change my approach to songwriting. I had mapped out the instrumentation before going into the studio and had quite a definite idea of how I wanted it to sound."

== Critical reception ==
Professional ratings
Review scores
Source	Rating
AllMusic	4/5 stars
DIY	3.5/5 stars
Paste	7.6/10

According to the review aggregator Metacritic, Cyrk received "universal acclaim" based on a weighted average score of 81 out of 100 from 23 critic scores.

In a four-star review for AllMusic, James Christopher Monger stated, "Le Bon somehow manages to make it all feel surprising natural, allowing the oddness of the songs, all of which are built upon the foundation of a simple, melodic hook, then allowed enough pasture to graze indefinitely." The album received a 3.5-star rating from DIY, whose reviewer Heather Steele remarked, "For all its playful charm, Cyrk is deliciously dark: it revels in its ability to marry calmness with the uncomfortable." Stephen M. Deusner of Paste assigned the release a 7.6 rating and commented, "As it progresses, Cyrk loses some of its musical and descriptive vitality, but Le Bon lingers over these physical depictions, lending her songs a beguiling tactility as well as a strong gravity."

== Track listing ==
All tracks are written by Cate Le Bon.

No.	Title	Length
1.	"Falcon Eyed"	2:48
2.	"Puts Me to Work"	3:27
3.	"Cyrk"	3:05
4.	"Julia"	3:23
5.	"Greta"	3:36
6.	"Fold the Cloth"	5:39
7.	"The Man I Wanted"	3:08
8.	"Through the Mill"	3:07
9.	"Ploughing Out, Pt. 1"	3:52
10.	"Ploughing Out, Pt. 2"	2:59
Total length:		35:09

== Personnel ==
- Cate Le Bon – vocals, songwriting
- H. Hawkline – album artwork, musician
- Andy Fung – musician
- Gwion Llewelyn – musician
- Meilyr Jones – musician
- Siôn Glyn – musician
- Stephen Black – musician
- Iwan Morgan – mixing, mastering
