= Ma (Devendra Banhart album) =

Studio album by Devendra Banhart
- Released: September 13, 2019
- Studio: Sea Horse Studios (Los Angeles)
- Length: 46:04
- Label: Nonesuch
- Producer: Noah Georgeson

Devendra Banhart chronology
Ape in Pink Marble (2016)	Ma (2019)

Singles from Ma
- 1. "Love Song" Released: January 16, 2020

Professional ratings
Aggregate scores
Source	Rating
Metacritic	79/100
Review scores
Source	Rating
AllMusic	3.5/5 stars
American Songwriter	3/5 stars
Exclaim!	7/10
MusicOMH	4/5 stars
Paste Magazine	7.2/10
Pitchfork	7.3/10
Under the Radar	7.5/10

Ma is the tenth studio album by Venezuelan-American musician Devendra Banhart. It was released on September 13, 2019 on Nonesuch Records.

The album was produced by Banhart's longtime collaborator Noah Georgeson and was then recorded in California at 64 Sound and Sea Horse Studios in Los Angeles and Anderson Canyons in Big Sur.

The album presents interwoven themes of motherhood, global politics, life and death through songs in English, Spanish, Portuguese and Japanese.

== Critical reception ==
"Ma" was met with generally favorable reviews from critics. At Metacritic, which assigns a weighted average rating out of 100 to reviews from mainstream publications, this release received an average score of 79, based on 12 reviews.

== Track listing ==
All tracks are written by Devendra Banhart unless noted.

Ma track listing
No.	Title	Writer(s)	Length
1.	"Is This Nice?"		2:54
2.	"Kantori Ongaku"		3:42
3.	"Ami"		3:56
4.	"Memorial"		4:39
5.	"Carolina"		2:32
6.	"Now All Gone"		3:37
7.	"Love Song"		4:22
8.	"Abre Las Manos"	Noah Georgeson	3:34
9.	"Taking a Page"	Carole King	3:36
10.	"October 12"		3:13
11.	"My Boyfriend's In The Band"		3:31
12.	"The Lost Coast"		3:11
13.	"Will I See You Tonight?"		3:23

== Charts ==
Chart performance for Ma
Chart	Peak position
French Albums (SNEP)	185
Portuguese Albums (AFP)	29
