= Me Oh My =

Studio album by Cate Le Bon
- Released: 12 October 2009
- Studio: The Signal Box (Cardiff)
- Genres: Indie rock; folk rock; psychedelic rock
- Length: 35:34
- Label: Irony Bored
- Producer: Krissie Jenkins

Cate Le Bon chronology
| Edrych yn Llygaid Ceffyl Benthyg (2008) | Me Oh My (2009) | Cyrk (2012) |

Professional ratings
Review scores
| Source | Rating |
|---|---|
| AllMusic | 3.5/5 stars |
| The Independent | 3/5 stars |
| NME | 8/10 stars |
| Pitchfork | (7.3/10) |

Me Oh My is the debut studio album by the Welsh musician Cate Le Bon, released on 12 October 2009 by Irony Bored. The album was originally going to be named Pet Deaths, referring to Le Bon's experiences with the subject. One song written in Welsh, "O am Gariad", was originally going to be on the album, but was discarded because it interrupted the flow, though Welsh can still be heard on some tracks.

== Track listing ==
1. "Me Oh My" – 3:47
2. "Sad Sad Feet" – 3:35
3. "Shoeing the Bones" – 3:39
4. "Hollow Trees House Hounds" – 3:33
5. "It's Not the End" – 3:23
6. "Terror of the Man" – 4:38
7. "Eyes So Bright" – 4:10
8. "Digging Song" – 3:02
9. "Burn Until the End" – 3:30
10. "Out to Sea" – 2:36
