= Younghusband (band) =

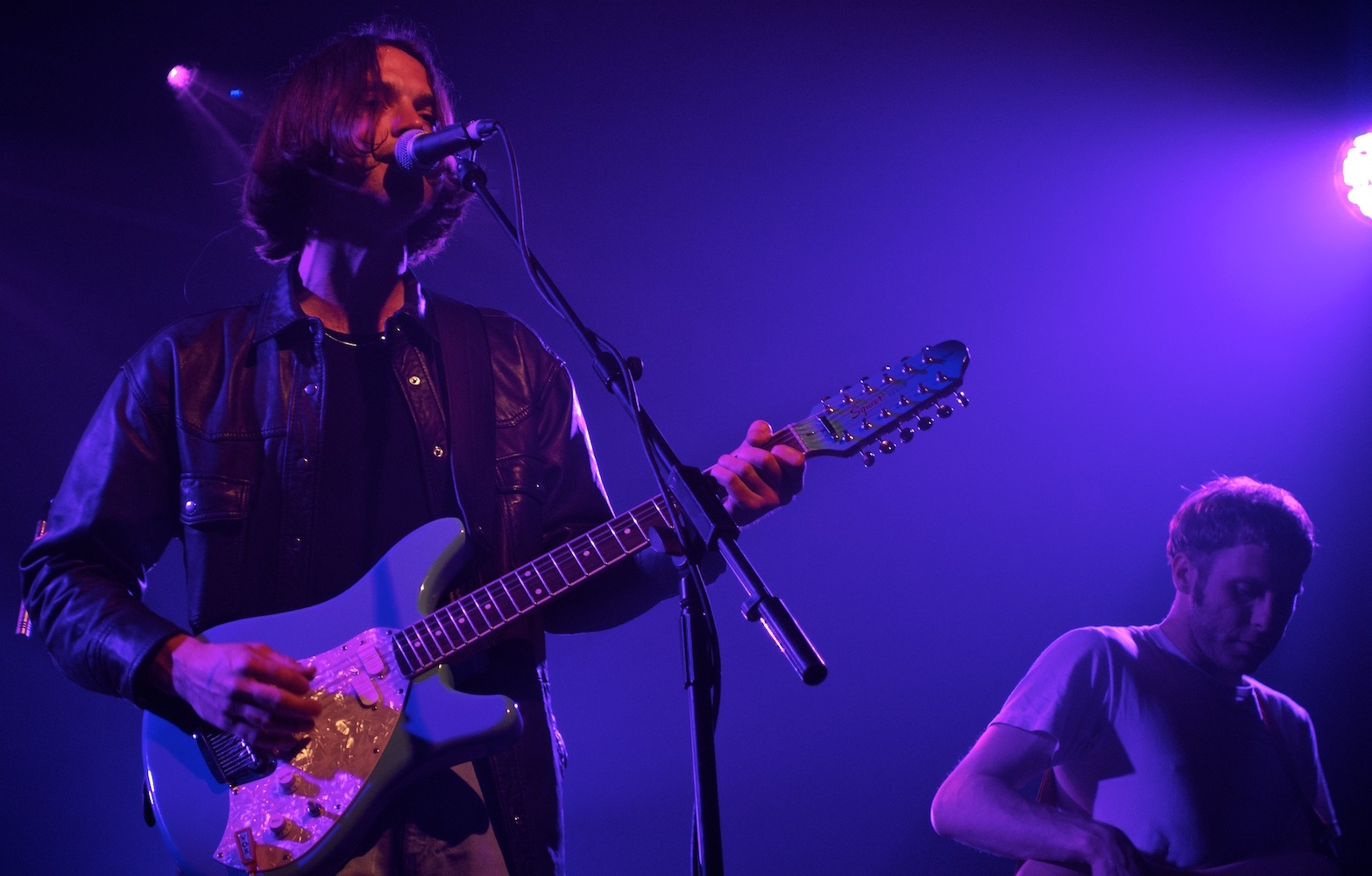
- Live London 2014

Background information
- Origin: Watford, Hertfordshire, England
- Genres: Alternative rock; psychedelic rock; indie rock
- Years active: 2007–2019
- Labels: ATP; Sonic Cathedral; Culturedeluxe
- Past members: Euan Hinshelwood; Joe Chilton; Adam Beach; Peter Baker; Adam Lambert
- Website: www.facebook.com/YoungHusbandMusic/

Younghusband were an English alternative rock band formed in 2007 in Watford, Hertfordshire before moving to London. The band was composed of singer-songwriter Euan Hinshelwood, bassist Joe Chilton, guitarist Adam Beach, and drummer Peter Baker.

The band name is taken from the colonial adventurer Francis Younghusband, who was detailed in the autobiographical travel book Seven Years in Tibet written by Austrian mountaineer Heinrich Harrer. Hinshelwood claimed that "his name popped up in the first or second line, so I got excited and never got round to actually reading the book".

== History ==
The band was originally conceived as a solo home studio project in 2007 by Euan Hinshelwood, who had previously played in several bands around Watford including garage rock bands CCTV and Noble Wilson, and folk outfit Kenton & Clarke before joining The New Shapes with whom he played bass. The New Shapes released 2 singles, got playlisted on XFM, received press attention via the NME and picked up for a Bacardi advert before splitting up. Hinshelwood released his debut digital-download single Could They be Jealous of Us in November 2009 via local label Culturedeluxe Records. The single was engineered by Peter Baker.

Hinshelwood expanded the lineup of Younghusband in June 2008 to a 3-piece with fellow ex-New Shapes bandmate Adam Lambert on drums and Joe Chilton on bass. Two EPs were then released, The Judas Cow in 2008 and Idiot Sun in 2009 via Culturedeluxe. Lambert was replaced by former Mohair drummer Peter Baker who had engineered the first single and also appeared on both EPs.

Since the early days of Younghusband, Hinshelwood and Baker worked together with singer Emma-Lee Moss AKA Emmy The Great, appearing on her first two albums. Whilst working with Moss, they befriended her boyfriend and studio engineer Adam Beach who subsequently joined the band on guitar. The band released their first release as a unit in the form of single Carousel / Nothing Nothing, which was released via Too Pure in June 2011. In the same year, the band signed to Sonic Cathedral Recordings and released the Crystal EP in November 2011.

In September 2013, the band released their debut album Dromes. The album was produced by New York based Nicolas Vernhes, who has previously worked with the likes of Deerhunter and Silver Jews. Hinshelwood had written to Verne asking if he's be willing to produce them, but pointed out that they couldn't afford to pay - impressed by the demo he received, he agreed to work if his airfare to England was covered and the album was recorded at Chapel Studios in Lincolnshire.

In 2015, the band signed to ATP Recordings and released their second album Dissolver in October 2015. The album was produced by Loop frontman Robert Hampson. The album displays a change in direction, with Hinshelwood stating that "A lot of people were expecting a mega-heavy-psych-washed-out record I think. As soon as we announced Robert was producing, those ideas were spread around. We’ve done the opposite, concentrated on songwriting and minimalism, sparse arrangements" and that "It’s refreshing to play songs rather than the same chord for 15 mins whilst wiggling around a delay pedal with your big toe".

The band released their third studio album, Swimmers, in June 2019 via Opposite Number. Drummer Peter Baker appears on the album, but is no longer a member of the band. Baker currently plays with blues band The Blue Fingers, and his previous band Mohair reformed for a one-off gig at the Borderline, London in June 2019.

Although there was no official announcement regarding their split in 2020, their Instagram bio was updated to state "2010 - 2020".

== Band members ==
- Euan Hinshelwood – lead vocals, guitar
- Joe Chilton – bass
- Adam Beach – guitar
- Peter Baker - drums

== Discography ==
=== Studio albums ===
- Dromes (2013), Sonic Cathedral Recordings
- Dissolver (2015), ATP Recordings
- Swimmers (2019), Opposite Number

=== EPs and singles ===
- "Could They be Jealous of Us" (2007), Culturedeluxe Records
- The Judas Cow EP (2008), Culturedeluxe Records
- Idiot Sun EP (2009), Culturedeluxe Records
- "Carousel" / "Nothing Nothing" (2011), Too Pure
- Crystal EP (2011), Sonic Cathedral Recordings
