= Sweet Baboo =

Welsh musician (Stephen Black)

- Born: Stephen Black; 1982 (age 43–44); Bethesda, Gwynedd, Wales
- Genres: Folk, indie folk, indie pop, psychedelic
- Occupations: Songwriter, musician
- Instruments: Vocals, guitar, bass guitar, keyboards, saxophone, clarinet, trumpet, flute
- Years active: 2003–present
- Labels: Moshi Moshi Records; Amazing Tapes from Canton
- Website: sweetbaboo.co.uk

Stephen Black (born 1982), also known by his stage name Sweet Baboo, is a Welsh musician. Before becoming a solo artist, he played with the band JT MOuse. Alongside his solo work, he has also played with many other artists, including Gruff Rhys, Cate Le Bon, Euros Childs, Piney Gir and Slow Club. He is bilingual in Welsh and English but usually sings in English.

== Career ==
Sweet Baboo's earliest musical influences were fellow Welsh musicians such as Super Furry Animals and Gorky's Zygotic Mynci. Later influences have included The Beach Boys, Dire Straits, Squeeze and Jonathan Richman. His musical style has been described as a mix of country and psychedelic – idiosyncratic, with a skill for writing darkly funny to piercingly tender lyrics.

Sweet Baboo has performed extensively at festivals such as Glastonbury, Festival N°6 and Latitude; he's been a regular performer at the Green Man Festival. He has worked with Cate Le Bon, Slow Club, Aldous Harding and H. Hawkline, and has also performed with and produced/recorded Euros Childs, The Pictish Trail, The Voluntary Butler Scheme and Islet, and collaborated with Gruff Rhys.

Sweet Baboo's album I'm a Dancer / Songs about Sleepin' was nominated for the first Welsh Music Prize in 2011.

Sweet Baboo launched single "Let's Go Swimming Wild" in 2012 as a free download. After winning BBC Radio 6 Music's "Rebel Playlist" weekly singles competition on the Steve Lamacq show, it was constantly played on the station, hourly on the hour. "If I Died...", the second single from his upcoming album, was released in March 2013 to much critical acclaim. To celebrate that month's St. David's Day, a Welsh-language version of the song (co-written with H. Hawkline) was released online. The third single from the album, "C'Mon Let's Mosh", was released in July 2013, having also won the 6 Music "Rebel Playlist" competition in June.

The album Ships was released in April 2013 on Moshi Moshi Records. Sweet Baboo followed the release with his first headlining tour in the UK and also performed solo shows and band shows in several festivals during summer 2013. Another headlining tour followed later in the year. The album was nominated for the Welsh Music Prize in 2013.

On 11 November 2013, Sweet Baboo released an EP titled Motorhome Songs.

In July 2014, Moshi Moshi released a limited edition 12" vinyl collection of tracks recorded during sessions on Marc Riley's show on BBC 6 Music over the previous decade. The release was followed by a short series of performances named The Test Pressings Tour and a duo tour with The Pictish Trail. The duo returned to that set for a one-off performance at the 2015 Green Man Festival, where Black also performed a full-band set (featuring The Mavron Quartet) and as part of the bands accompanying H. Hawkline and Meilyr Jones.

In December 2014, Black contributed vocals to Mowbird's Lady Lion EP on Shape Records. He also played saxophone on the track "Lady Low" from Teleman's 2014 debut album Breakfast.

His following album, The Boombox Ballads, was released in August 2015, again on Moshi Moshi. The track "You Got Me Time Keeping" features Tender Prey (Laura Bryon) on vocals. In March 2016, he released an EP, Dennis, which featured unreleased tracks from the recordings of The Boombox Ballads and two covers, one of them of a Dennis Wilson track.

Sweet Baboo's next album, Wild Imagination, was released in June 2017 on Moshi Moshi. In October 2017 the album was nominated for the 2016–2017 Welsh Music Prize.

In October 2022, Black announced a new Sweet Baboo album - the first new music from this project in five years - with the single "Good Luck", written by H. Hawkline. The album The Wreckage was released in January 2023 on Black's own label Amazing Tapes from Canton.

Collaborating with musician Paul Jones, Black has released albums under the name Group Listening. Clarinet & Piano: Selected Works Vol.1 (2018) and Clarinet & Piano: Selected Works Vol. 2 (2022) were re-workings of existing tracks by a wide variety of musicians, and Walks (2024) is their first composed of original material.

Black also continues to produce, record and participate in Euros Childs's solo albums.

== Personal life ==
Black was born in Bethesda in north Wales, grew up in Colwyn Bay and Trefriw, and has been living in Cardiff since he was 18. He studied music at the Royal Welsh College of Music & Drama. His brother David has played on some of his recordings. He is close friends with fellow musicians Cate Le Bon and H. Hawkline and often performs in their accompanying bands. The three, along with musician R. Seiliog (Robin Edwards), also briefly played together as post-rock band Means Heinz.

Black married his longtime girlfriend Bronwen in October 2013; they live with their son (born 2014) in Cardiff.

== Solo discography ==
=== Albums ===
- The Mighty Baboo (2008)
- Hello Wave (2009)
- I'm a Dancer / Songs about Sleeping (vinyl 2011; CD 2014)
- Ships (2013)
- The Marc Riley BBC Sessions (2014)
- The Boombox Ballads (2015)
- Wild Imagination (2017)
- The Vending Machine Project (vinyl 2018)
- The Wreckage (2023)

=== EPs ===
- C'mon Let's Permoose (2004)
- Girl Under a Tree (vinyl 2011; CD 2014)
- Motorhome Songs (vinyl 2013)
- Dennis (vinyl 2016)

=== Stand-alone singles ===
- Mountain (2006)
- C'mon Beef (2007)
