= Courtney Barnett discography =

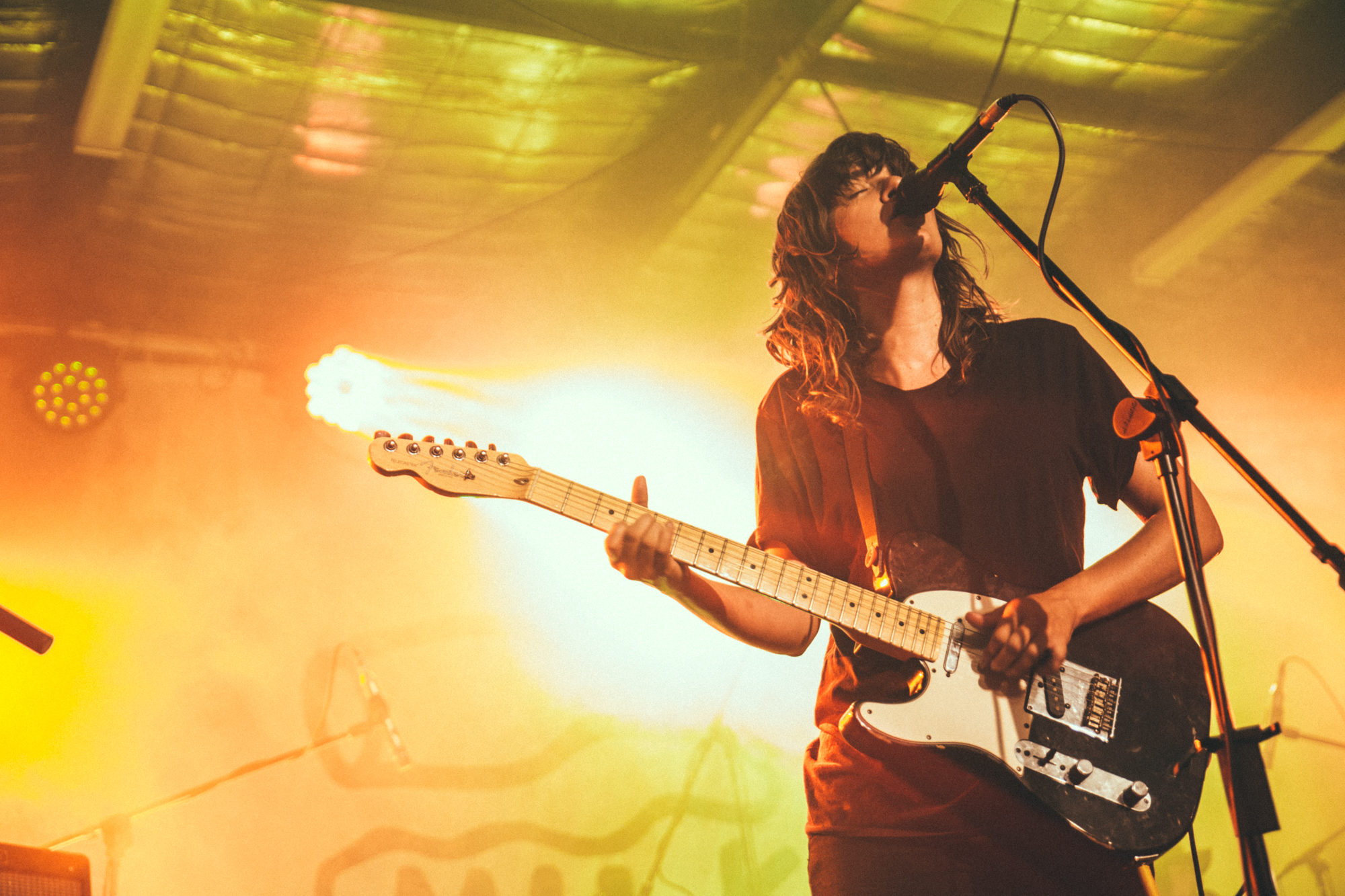
- Courtney Barnett performing at Miami Marketta in March 2016
- Studio albums: 4
- EPs: 2
- Live albums: 1
- Compilation albums: 1
- Singles: 23
- Music videos: 14
- Collaborative albums: 1

The discography of Australian musician, singer and songwriter Courtney Barnett consists of four studio albums, one collaborative album, one live album, two extended plays, twenty-three singles and fourteen music videos. Barnett's debut studio album, Sometimes I Sit and Think, and Sometimes I Just Sit (2015), was certified Gold by the Australian Recording Industry Association (ARIA), and won her the awards for Best Female Artist and Breakthrough Artist – Release at the 2015 ARIA Awards.

== Albums ==
=== Studio albums ===
List of studio albums, with selected chart positions and certifications
Title	Album details	Peak chart positions										Certifications
Title	Album details	AUS	BEL (FL)	GER	IRE	NLD	NZ	SCO	SWI	UK	US	Certifications
Sometimes I Sit and Think, and Sometimes I Just Sit	Released: 20 March 2015; Label: Milk!, Marathon Artists, House Anxiety, Mom + Pop; Formats: Vinyl, CD, Cassette, digital download	4	55	73	28	26	19	17	66	16	20	ARIA: Gold; BPI: Silver
Tell Me How You Really Feel	Released: 18 May 2018; Label: Milk! Records, Marathon Artists, Mom + Pop; Formats: Vinyl, CD, digital download	2	20	24	36	29	10	5	19	9	22	
Things Take Time, Take Time	Released: 12 November 2021; Label: Milk!, Marathon Artists, Mom + Pop; Formats: Vinyl, CD, digital download, streaming	5	50	38	—	— (Note: Things Take Time, Take Time did not enter the Dutch Album Top 100, but entered the Dutch Vinyl 33 chart at number 14.)	18	17	50	31	200	
Creature of Habit	Released: 27 March 2026; Label: Mom + Pop; Formats: Vinyl, CD, digital download, streaming	19	186	—	—	— (Note: Creature of Habit did not enter the Dutch Album Top 100, but entered the Dutch Vinyl 33 chart at number 29.)	34	10	—	29	— (Note: Creature of Habit did not enter the US Billboard 200, but peaked at number 25 on the US Billboard Top Album Sales chart.)	

=== Collaborative albums ===
List of collaborative albums, with selected chart positions
Title	Album details	Peak chart positions									
Title	Album details	AUS	BEL (FL)	GER	IRE	NLD	NZ	SCO	SWI	UK	US
Lotta Sea Lice (with Kurt Vile)	Released: 13 October 2017; Label: Matador, Milk!, Marathon Artists; Formats: 12" vinyl, CD, digital download	5	26	75	36	27	12	8	35	11	51

=== Live albums ===
List of live albums
Title	Details	Peak chart positions
Title	Details	US Sales
MTV Unplugged (Live in Melbourne)	Released: 6 December 2019; Label: Milk! Records; Formats: Vinyl, CD, Digital download, streaming	50
From Where I’m Standing: Live from the Royal Exhibition Building, Melbourne	Released: 10 April 2021; Label: Milk! Records, Blood Records; Formats: Vinyl	—

=== Soundtrack albums ===
List of soundtrack albums
Title	Album details
End of the Day (Music from the film Anonymous Club)	Released: 8 September 2023; Label: Milk! Records; Formats: CD, digital download, streaming

=== Compilation albums ===
List of compilation albums
Title	Details	Peak chart positions					
Title	Details	AUS Hit.	US	US Folk	US Heat	US Indie	US Rock
The Double EP: A Sea of Split Peas	Released: 15 October 2013; Label: Milk! Records, Marathon Artists, House Anxiety, Mom + Pop; Formats: 12" vinyl, CD, digital download	3	165	6	2	26	40

== Extended plays ==
Title	Details
I've Got a Friend Called Emily Ferris	Released: 2 April 2012; Label: Milk! Records; Formats: 10" vinyl, CD, digital download
How to Carve a Carrot into a Rose	Released: 2 September 2013; Label: Milk! Records; Formats: CD, digital download

== Singles ==
List of singles, with selected chart positions, showing year released and album name
Title	Year	Peak chart positions									Album
Title	Year	AUS Hit.	BEL (FL) Tip	ICE	MEX Air.	SCO	UK Sales	UK Indie	US AAA	US Rock Air.	Album
"Avant Gardener"	2013	—	—	—	—	—	—	—	—	—	The Double EP: A Sea of Split Peas
"History Eraser"	2013	—	—	—	—	—	—	—	—	—	The Double EP: A Sea of Split Peas
"Pedestrian at Best"	2015	17	—	—	37	—	10	42	—	—	Sometimes I Sit and Think, and Sometimes I Just Sit
"Kim's Caravan"	2015	—	—	—	—	—	7	—	—	—	Sometimes I Sit and Think, and Sometimes I Just Sit
"Depreston"	2015	—	—	—	—	—	—	—	—	—	Sometimes I Sit and Think, and Sometimes I Just Sit
"Dead Fox"	2015	—	27	—	—	—	—	—	22	—	Sometimes I Sit and Think, and Sometimes I Just Sit
"Nobody Really Cares If You Don't Go to the Party"	2015	—	19	—	—	—	11	—	—	—	Sometimes I Sit and Think, and Sometimes I Just Sit
"Boxing Day Blues (Revisited)"	2015	—	—	—	—	—	7	—	—	—	Non-album singles
"Three Packs a Day"	2016	—	—	—	—	—	—	—	—	—	Non-album singles
"How to Boil an Egg"	2017	—	—	—	—	—	—	—	—	—	Non-album singles
"Over Everything" (with Kurt Vile)	2017	—	—	—	32	—	—	—	—	—	Lotta Sea Lice
"Continental Breakfast" (with Kurt Vile)	2017	—	47	—	—	—	—	—	—	—	Lotta Sea Lice
"Nameless, Faceless"	2018	—	—	—	28	—	2	—	20	—	Tell Me How You Really Feel
"Need a Little Time"	2018	—	—	—	—	—	—	—	—	—	Tell Me How You Really Feel
"City Looks Pretty"	2018	—	—	—	45	93	11	—	—	—	Tell Me How You Really Feel
"Sunday Roast"	2018	—	—	—	—	—	—	—	—	—	Tell Me How You Really Feel
"Charity"	2018	—	—	—	—	—	—	—	26	—	Tell Me How You Really Feel
"Charity" (live) / "Houses"	2018	—	—	—	—	—	3	—	—	—	Spotify Singles
"Small Talk"	2018	—	—	—	—	—	—	—	—	—	Non-album singles
"Everybody Here Hates You"	2019	—	—	—	—	—	14	—	31	—	Non-album singles
"Rae Street"	2021	—	—	—	—	—	—	—	35	—	Things Take Time, Take Time
"Before You Gotta Go"	2021	—	—	—	—	—	—	—	—	—	Things Take Time, Take Time
"I'll Be Your Mirror"	2021	—	—	—	—	—	—	—	—	—	I'll Be Your Mirror: A Tribute to The Velvet Underground & Nico
"Write a List of Things to Look Forward to"	2021	—	—	11	—	—	—	—	5	34	Things Take Time, Take Time
"If I Don't Hear from You Tonight"	2021	—	—	—	—	—	—	—	—	—	Things Take Time, Take Time
"Different Now"	2023	—	—	—	—	—	—	—	—	—	Different Now b/w This Time of Night
"Lotta Love"	2025	—	—	—	—	—	—	—	—	—	Heart of Gold: The Songs of Neil Young
"Stay in Your Lane"	2025	—	—	—	—	—	—	—	10	44	Creature of Habit
"Site Unseen" (featuring Waxahatchee)	2026	—	—	—	—	—	—	—	5	46	Creature of Habit
"Mantis"/"Sugar Plum"	2026	—	—	—	—	—	—	—	—	—	Creature of Habit
"One Thing at a Time"	2026	—	—	—	—	—	—	—	—	—	Creature of Habit
"—" denotes a recording that did not chart or was not released in that territory.

== Other charted songs ==
List of singles, with selected chart positions, showing year released and album name
Title	Year	Peak chart positions	Album
Title	Year	MEX Air.	Album
"Debbie Downer"	2016	46	Sometimes I Sit and Think, and Sometimes I Just Sit

== Music videos ==
Title	Year	Album
"History Eraser"	2012	How to Carve a Carrot Into a Rose
"Avant Gardener"	2013	The Double EP: A Sea of Split Peas
"Anonymous Club"	2014	The Double EP: A Sea of Split Peas
"Pedestrian at Best"	2015	Sometimes I Sit and Think, and Sometimes I Just Sit
"Depreston"	2015	Sometimes I Sit and Think, and Sometimes I Just Sit
"Kim's Caravan"	2015	Sometimes I Sit and Think, and Sometimes I Just Sit
"Dead Fox"	2015	Sometimes I Sit and Think, and Sometimes I Just Sit
"Nobody Really Cares If You Don't Go to the Party"	2015	Sometimes I Sit and Think, and Sometimes I Just Sit
"Elevator Operator"	2016	Sometimes I Sit and Think, and Sometimes I Just Sit
"Over Everything" (with Kurt Vile)	2017	Lotta Sea Lice
"Continental Breakfast" (with Kurt Vile)	2017	Lotta Sea Lice
"Nameless, Faceless"	2018	Tell Me How You Really Feel
"Need a Little Time"	2018	Tell Me How You Really Feel
"City Looks Pretty"	2018	Tell Me How You Really Feel
"Charity"	2018	Tell Me How You Really Feel
"Rae Street"	2021	Things Take Time, Take Time
"Before You Gotta Go"	2021	Things Take Time, Take Time
"Write a List of Things to Look Forward To"	2021	Things Take Time, Take Time
"If I Don't Hear From You Tonight"	2021	Things Take Time, Take Time
"Start Somewhere/Life Balance/First Slow"	2023	End of the Day
"Get On With It"	2023	End of the Day
"Stay in Your Lane"	2025	Creature of Habit
"Site Unseen"	2026	Creature of Habit
