= List of awards and nominations received by Courtney Barnett =

Courtney Barnett awards and nominations
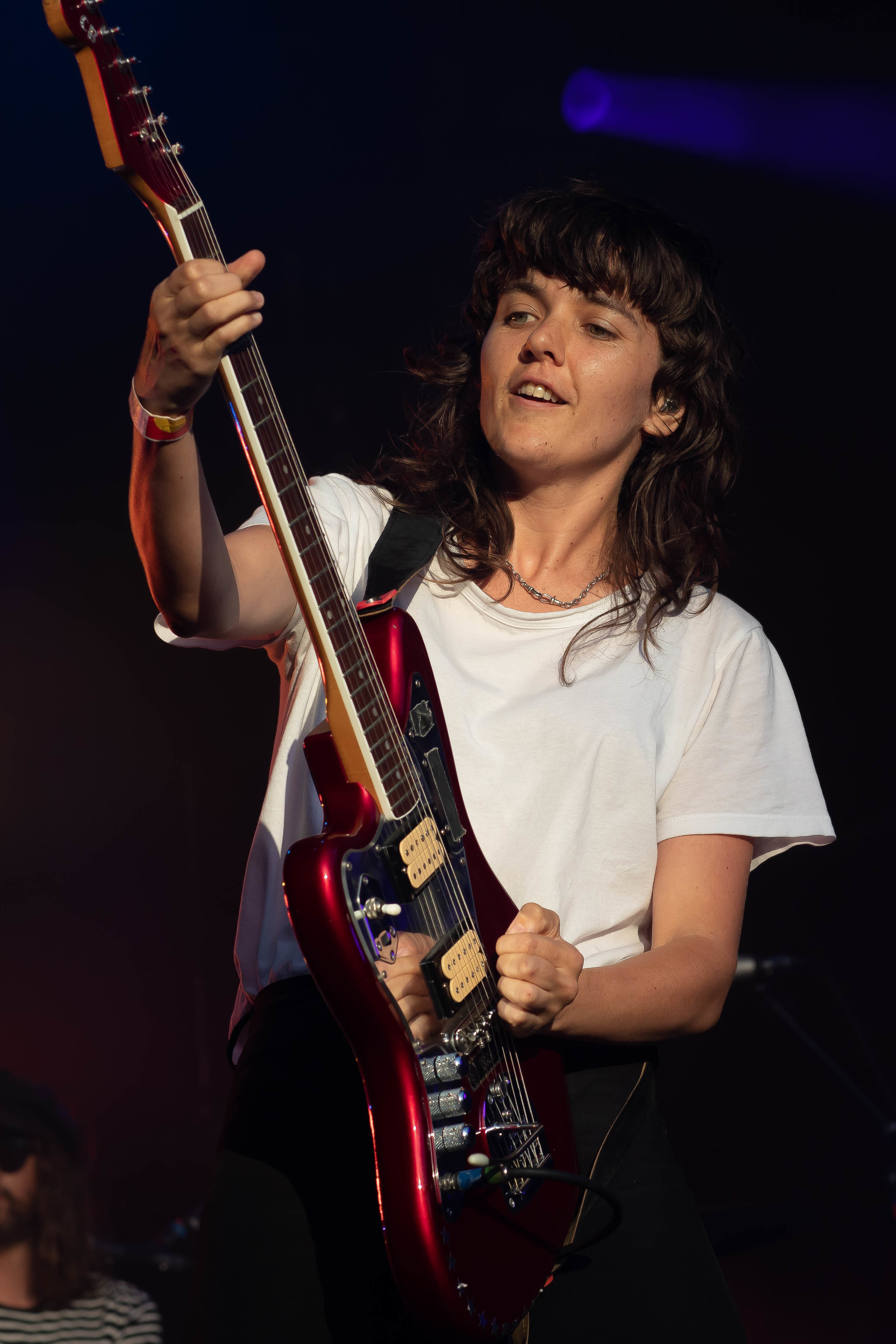
- Barnett performing in February 2019
Awards and nominations
Award	Wins	Nominations

Courtney Barnett is an Australian singer, songwriter and musician. Barnett has released three studio albums: Sometimes I Sit and Think, and Sometimes I Just Sit (2015), Tell Me How You Really Feel (2018) and Things Take Time, Take Time (2021); she also released a collaborative album with Kurt Vile, Lotta Sea Lice (2017).

== AIR Awards ==
The Australian Independent Record Awards (commonly known informally as AIR Awards) is an annual awards night to recognise, promote and celebrate the success of Australia's Independent Music sector.

Year	Nominee / work	Award	Result
2013	Courtney Barnett	Breakthrough Independent Artist	Nominated
2013	"History Eraser"	Best Independent Single/EP	Nominated
2014	Courtney Barnett	Best Independent Artist	Won
2014	"Avant Gardener"	Best Independent Single/EP	Won
2015	Courtney Barnett	Best Independent Artist	Won
2015	Sometimes I Sit and Think, and Sometimes I Just Sit	Best Independent Album	Won
2015	"Depreston"	Best Independent Single/EP	Won
2015	"Pedestrian At Best"	Best Independent Single/EP	Nominated
2019	Courtney Barnett	Best Independent Artist	Won
2019	Tell Me How You Really Feel	Best Independent Album or EP	Won
2019	"Nameless, Faceless"	Best Independent Single or EP	Nominated
2022	Things Take Time, Take Time	Independent Album of the Year	Nominated
2022	Things Take Time, Take Time	Best Independent Rock Album or EP	Won

== APRA Music Awards ==
The APRA Awards are presented annually from 1982 by the Australasian Performing Right Association (APRA), "honouring composers and songwriters".

Year	Recipient / Nominated Work	Award	Result
2013	"History Eraser"	Song of the Year	Nominated
2015	"Anonymous Club"	Song of the Year	Shortlisted
2015	"Pickles from the Jar"	Song of the Year	Shortlisted
2016	Courtney Barnett	Songwriter of the Year	Won
2016	"Pedestrian at Best"	Song of the Year	Nominated
2016	"Dead Fox"	Song of the Year	Shortlisted
2019	"Nameless Faceless"	Song of the Year	Shortlisted
2022	"Rae Street"	Song of the Year	Shortlisted
2023	"If I Don't Hear from You Tonight"	Song of the Year	Shortlisted

== ARIA Music Awards ==
The ARIA Music Awards is an annual awards ceremony that recognises excellence, innovation, and achievement across all genres of Australian music. Barnett has won 6 ARIA Music Awards from 20 nominations.

Year	Recipient / Nominated Work	Award	Result
2014	"Avant Gardener" – Charlie Ford (Director)	Best Video	Nominated
2015	Sometimes I Sit and Think, and Sometimes I Just Sit	Best Cover Art	Won
2015	Sometimes I Sit and Think, and Sometimes I Just Sit	Best Independent Release	Won
2015	Sometimes I Sit and Think, and Sometimes I Just Sit	Album of the Year	Nominated
2015	Sometimes I Sit and Think, and Sometimes I Just Sit	Best Rock Album	Nominated
2015	Sometimes I Sit and Think, and Sometimes I Just Sit	Breakthrough Artist	Won
2015	Sometimes I Sit and Think, and Sometimes I Just Sit	Best Female Artist	Won
2015	Sometimes I Sit & Think, & Sometimes I Just Sit Album Tour	Best Australian Live Act	Nominated
2015	"Pedestrian at Best" – Charlie Ford (Director)	Best Video	Nominated
2016	National Theatre Tour	Best Australian Live Act	Nominated
2016	"Elevator Operator" – Sunny Leunig (Director)	Best Video	Nominated
2018	Tell Me How You Really Feel	Album of the Year	Nominated
2018	Tell Me How You Really Feel	Best Female Artist	Nominated
2018	Tell Me How You Really Feel	Best Rock Album	Won
2018	Tell Me How You Really Feel	Best Independent Release	Nominated
2018	Lotta Sea Lice (with Kurt Vile)	Best Adult Contemporary Album	Nominated
2018	Danny Cohen and Courtney Barnett – "Need a Little Time"	Best Video	Nominated
2018	Courtney Barnett – Tell Me How You Really Feel National Tour	Best Australian Live Act	Nominated
2018	Barnett, Dan Luscombe & Burke Reid for Tell Me How You Really Feel	Producer of the Year	Nominated
2018	Burke Reid for Tell Me How You Really Feel	Engineer of the Year	Won
2022	Things Take Time, Take Time	Best Solo Artist	Nominated
2022	Things Take Time, Take Time	Best Independent Release	Nominated
2022	Courtney Barnett & Stella Mozgawa for Courtney Barnett – Things Take Time, Take Time	Producer – Best Produced Album	Nominated
2026	Creature of Habit	Best Rock Album	Nominated

== Australian Music Prize ==
The Australian Music Prize (the AMP) is an annual award of $30,000 given to an Australian band or solo artist in recognition of the merit of an album released during the year of award. The commenced in 2005.

Year	Nominee / work	Award	Result
2015	Sometimes I Sit and Think, and Sometimes I Just Sit	Australian Music Prize	Won
2018	Tell Me How You Really Feel	Australian Music Prize	Nominated
2026	Creature of Habit	Australian Music Prize	Nominated

== Brit Awards ==
Year	Recipient / Nominated Work	Award	Result
2016	Courtney Barnett	International Female Solo Artist	Nominated

== Grammy Awards ==
Year	Recipient / Nominated Work	Award	Result
2016	Courtney Barnett	Best New Artist	Nominated

== J Award ==
The J Awards are an annual series of Australian music awards that were established by the Australian Broadcasting Corporation's youth-focused radio station Triple J. They commenced in 2005.

Year	Nominee / work	Award	Result	Ref.
2015	Sometimes I Sit and Think, and Sometimes I Just Sit	Australian Album of the Year	Won	
2015	"Pedestrian at Best"	Australian Video of the Year	Nominated	
2016	"Elevator Operator"	Australian Video of the Year	Nominated	
2018	Tell Me How You Really Feel	Australian Album of the Year	Nominated	
2022	Courtney Barnett	Double J Artist of the Year	Nominated	

== Libera Awards ==
The Libera Awards are an annual awards ceremony presented by the American Association of Independent Music (A2IM) to celebrate excellence in independent music.

Year	Nominee / work	Award	Result
2016	Sometimes I Sit and Think, and Sometimes I Just Sit	Album of the Year	Nominated
2016	Sometimes I Sit and Think, and Sometimes I Just Sit	Best Breakthrough Artist	Won
2016	Sometimes I Sit and Think, and Sometimes I Just Sit	Groundbreaking Album of the Year	Nominated
2019	Tell Me How You Really Feel	Best Rock Album	Won
2022	Things Take Time, Take Time	Best Alternative Rock Album	Nominated

== Music Victoria Awards ==
The Music Victoria Awards, are an annual awards night celebrating Victorian music. They commenced in 2005.

Year	Nominee / work	Award	Result
2012	herself	Best Female Artist	Nominated
2012	herself	Best New Artist	Nominated
2013	herself	Best Female Artist	Nominated
2013	"History Eraser"	Best Song	Nominated
2014	herself	Best Female Artist	Won
2014	"Avant Gardener"	Best Song	Won
2015	herself	Best Female Artist	Won
2015	herself	Best Band	Won
2015	"Pedestrian at Best"	Best Song	Nominated
2015	"Depreston"	Best Song	Won
2015	Sometimes I Sit and Think and Sometimes I Just Sit	Best Album	Won
2018	herself	Best Female Musician	Won
2018	herself	Best Solo Artists	Won
2018	herself	Best Live Act	Nominated
2018	"Nameless, Faceless"	Best Song	Nominated
2018	Tell Me How You Really Feel	Best Album	Won
2019	herself	Best Female Musician	Nominated
2019	herself	Best Solo Artist	Won
2020	herself	Best Solo Artist	Nominated
2022	"Rae Street"	Best Victorian Song	Nominated

== National Live Music Awards ==
The National Live Music Awards (NLMAs) are a broad recognition of Australia's diverse live industry, celebrating the success of the Australian live scene. The awards commenced in 2016.

Year	Nominee / work	Award	Result
2016	herself	International Live Achievement (Solo)	Won
2017	herself	Best Live Voice of the Year – People's Choice	Nominated
2018	herself	International Live Achievement (Solo)	Won
2020	herself	Live Guitarist of the Year	Nominated

== Rolling Stone Australia Awards ==
The Rolling Stone Australia Awards are awarded annually in January or February by the Australian edition of Rolling Stone magazine for outstanding contributions to popular culture in the previous year.

Year	Nominee / work	Award	Result	Ref.
2023	"Rae Street"	Best Single	Nominated	

== Sweden GAFFA Awards ==
Delivered since 2010, the GAFFA Awards (Swedish: GAFFA Priset) are a Swedish award that rewards popular music awarded by the magazine of the same name.

Year	Nominee / work	Award	Result	Ref.
2019	Herself	Best Foreign Solo Act	Nominated	
2019	Tell Me How You Really Feel	Best Foreign Album	Nominated	
