= Philippe Ascoli =

French music executive

Philippe Ascoli was the Chief Creative Director at Marathon Artists.

He began his career in 1989 at Polydor in France, where he signed MC Solaar. After a stint as head of A&R for Virgin France in 1992, Ascoli founded Source France in 1995, where he signed acts Teri Moïse, Phoenix, Air, Doc Gynéco and Saian Supa Crew.

Moving to London in November 1998, Ascoli founded Source UK, signing acts Turin Brakes, Kings of Convenience, Gemma Hayes...

In 2001, he became Director of A&R for Virgin UK, where he was responsible for such artists as Massive Attack, the Chemical Brothers, Daft Punk, and N.E.R.D. The following year he was named MD of Virgin UK and brought new artists to the label including The Kooks, Kelis, Jamie T, and the Thrills. During this time Ascoli also entered into a joint venture with Relentless to work with Joss Stone and KT Tunstall.

Ascoli returned to his native France to relaunch Source as Source ETC, signing artists like Rose and Yelle.

In 2006, Ascoli worked as Virgin France MD, where he worked with David Guetta and Daft Punk.

After this, Ascoli became Senior A&R Director for Columbia UK, signing Katy B and Magnetic Man.

In 2012, Ascoli founded label Marathon Artists together with Paul-Rene Albertini and Jimmy Mikaoui in London. The label has released records from artists including Jagwar Ma, Courtney Barnett, Real Lies, Childhood, and Max Jury. Ascoli also managed French electronic music duo, Paradis.In August 2016 a press release announced that he had relinquished his role as chief creative officer and would base himself in Paris to pursue independent projects relinquish his role as chief creative officer https://www.recordoftheday.com/news-and-press/philippe-ascoli-leaves-cco-role-at-marathon-artists

Ascoli left Marathon Artists in September 2016 and moved back to Paris to run GUM Label (Green United Music) as managing director.
