= (04:30) Idler =

(4:30) Idler

Studio album by Jamie Isaac
- Released: 1 June 2018
- Genre: Bossa nova, electronic, jazz
- Length: 43:13
- Label: Marathon Artists
- Producer: Jamie Isaac

Jamie Isaac chronology
Couch Baby (2016)	(4:30) Idler (2018)

(4:30) Idler is the second album by London-based singer and producer Jamie Isaac. It was released on June 1, 2018, via Marathon Artists.

Professional ratings
Review scores
Source	Rating
Clash	(7/10)
The Independent	4/5 stars
The Guardian	4/5 stars

== Track listing ==
No.	Title	Length
1.	"Wings"	4:26
2.	"Doing Better"	3:35
3.	"Maybe"	4:27
4.	"(4:30) Idler / Sleep"	4:14
5.	"Interlude (Yellow Jacket)"	1:09
6.	"Eyes Closed"	4:02
7.	"Slurp"	3:56
8.	"Counts for Something"	4:18
9.	"Melt"	3:30
10.	"Drifted / Rope"	3:50
11.	"Delight"	5:40
Total length:		43:13
