= Couch Baby =

Studio album by Jamie Isaac
- Released: 8 July 2016
- Genres: Alternative, Electronic, Ambient, Nu jazz
- Length: 42:15
- Label: Marathon Artists
- Producer: Jamie Isaac

Jamie Isaac chronology
| Blue Break (EP) (2014) | Couch Baby (2016) | (04:30) Idler (2018) |

Couch Baby is the debut album by Jamie Isaac. It was released on July 8, 2016. The album followed Isaac's earlier work as a producer and recording artist and marked his first full-length studio release. Prior to its release, several tracks from Couch Baby were issued individually, including "She Doesn't Want to Know", "I Got a Feeling", and "Maybe". The album was released through Marathon Artists, and was supported by promotional performances and appearances by Isaac.

== Critical response ==
Professional ratings
Review scores
| Source | Rating |
|---|---|
| Financial Times | 4/5 stars |
| The Line of Best Fit | (7/10) |

== Track listing ==
| No. | Title | Length |
|---|---|---|
| 1. | "Intro" | 0:40 |
| 2. | "Find the Words" | 3:40 |
| 3. | "CNT U SEE" | 3:43 |
| 4. | "Last Drip" | 4:03 |
| 5. | "Staying With Me All Night" | 4:38 |
| 6. | "Know U Like Me" | 3:58 |
| 7. | "Beauty" | 4:16 |
| 8. | "Couch Baby/Interlude" | 2:30 |
| 9. | "Pigeon" | 4:30 |
| 10. | "All My Days" | 3:57 |
| 11. | "She'll Always Close In" | 4:13 |
| 12. | "Outro" | 2:07 |
