= Tell Me How You Really Feel =

Studio album by Courtney Barnett
- Released: 18 May 2018
- Recorded: July 2017
- Studios: Soundpark, Northcote, Victoria, Australia
- Genres: Indie rock; alternative rock
- Length: 37:16
- Labels: Milk!; Mom + Pop; Marathon Artists
- Producers: Courtney Barnett; Burke Reid; Dan Luscombe

Courtney Barnett chronology
| Lotta Sea Lice (2017) | Tell Me How You Really Feel (2018) | Things Take Time, Take Time (2021) |

Singles from Tell Me How You Really Feel
- 1. "Nameless, Faceless" Released: 16 February 2018; 2. "Need a Little Time" Released: 16 March 2018; 3. "City Looks Pretty" Released: 19 April 2018; 4. "Sunday Roast" Released: 10 May 2018; 5. "Charity" Released: 23 August 2018

Tell Me How You Really Feel is the second studio album by Australian singer-songwriter Courtney Barnett, released on 18 May 2018 by Barnett's Milk! Records, Mom + Pop Music, and Marathon Artists.

Tell Me How You Really Feel received generally positive reviews from critics, with praise in particular given to Barnett's more subdued musical style in comparison to previous releases. The album achieved commercial success, debuting and peaking at number 2 on the ARIA Charts, number 9 on the UK Official Albums Chart, and number 22 on the Billboard 200.

== Recording and production ==
The album was recorded at Soundpark studios in Melbourne with producer Burke Reid, who also worked on Barnett's previous solo album, Sometimes I Sit and Think, and Sometimes I Just Sit. Barnett was joined on the album by her live rhythm section of Bones Sloane (bass, backing vocals) and Dave Mudie (drums, backing vocals), as well as guitarist Dan Luscombe of The Drones. The album also features guest appearances from the Deal sisters, Kim and Kelley. The album was teased with a video shared across Barnett's social media outlets, in which Barnett tries out different instruments and sings snippets of new songs. The album's lead single, "Nameless, Faceless", was released on 16 February 2018. A music video for "Need a Little Time" directed by Danny Cohen was released on 15 March 2018. "City Looks Pretty" was released on 19 April 2018 along with an accompanying music video directed by Barnett. A video for "Sunday Roast" was released on 10 May 2018.

== Music and lyrics ==
Tell Me How You Really Feel is characterised by casual guitar-driven rock songs generally arranged in verse-chorus structures. The guitar work ranges from noisy to subdued. Barnett's vocals are delivered in her distinctive laid-back "sing-speak" style with rich, rhyming lyrics. Among other themes, the album explores the challenges and frustrations of being a lyricist upon whom others have placed high expectations. Barnett's style on this album has been compared to grunge bands Nirvana and Hole and to indie rock musicians Pavement and Liz Phair.

== Critical reception ==
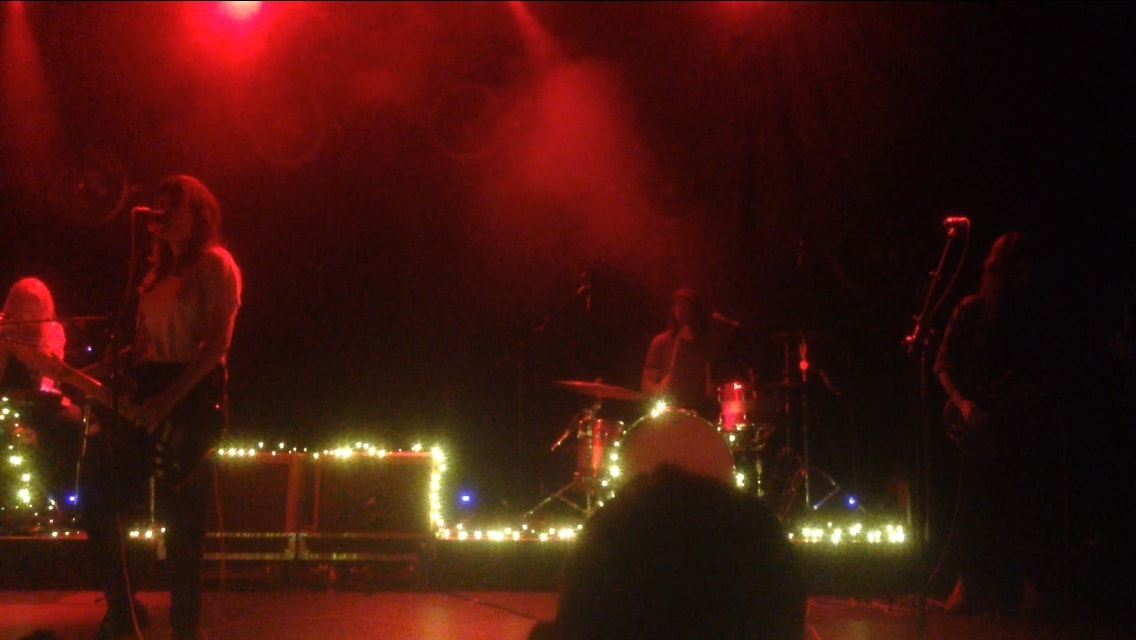
Barnett performing in August 2018 in support of the album

Professional ratings
Aggregate scores
| Source | Rating |
|---|---|
| AnyDecentMusic? | 7.7/10 |
| Metacritic | 80/100 |
Review scores
| Source | Rating |
| AllMusic | 3/5 stars |
| The A.V. Club | C |
| Chicago Tribune | 3.5/4 stars |
| The Guardian | 4/5 stars |
| The Independent | 4/5 stars |
| NME | 4/5 stars |
| Pitchfork | 7.4/10 |
| Q | 4/5 stars |
| Rolling Stone | 4/5 stars |
| Vice | A− |

Upon its release, Tell Me How You Really Feel received generally positive reviews from critics. On Metacritic, which assigns a normalised rating out of 100 to reviews from mainstream critics, the album received an average score of 80, based on 28 reviews. Laura Snapes of Pitchfork called the album "smaller, more introverted", and wrote that the lower energy yielded an "adventurous and nuanced" album that "tells stories of tenderness and frustration". Jeremy Winograd of Slant Magazine said that "it may lack some of the instant affability of 2015’s Sometimes I Sit and Think, and Sometimes I Just Sit, but that’s by design."

Writing for the Chicago Tribune, Greg Kot said that the songs felt "deceptively buoyant, effortless". NME's Dannii Leivers wrote that the album's charm lies in the "dark and melancholy" way that Barnett is "exposing her vulnerabilities and fears". Nate Rogers of Flood Magazine wrote that "Barnett's [second] LP is her most somber to date – an emotional drop in tuning, in a sense. It's still littered with her Petty-esque sense of hooks – "Charity" and "Crippling Self-Doubt and a General Lack of Confidence" in particular are earworms par excellence – but lyrically, it's a raw one."

Annie Zaleski of The A.V. Club considered the album's languid nature a detriment, saying that it "lacks the spry, buzzing energy of her debut", which causes it to be a "disappointing and muted record". Multiple critics agreed, however, that "Crippling Self-Doubt and a General Lack of Confidence" was a standout song from the album, with Kot calling it a "little pop jewel" and Zaleski referring to it as a "spiraling pop standout".

=== Accolades ===
| Publication | Country | Accolade | Year | Rank |
|---|---|---|---|---|
| Paste | US | The 50 Best Albums of 2018 | 2018 | 3 |
| The Skinny | UK | The 50 Best Albums of 2018 | 2018 | 8 |

At the ARIA Music Awards of 2018, Tell Me How You Really Feel won the Best Rock Album.

At the J Awards of 2018, the album was nominated for Australian Album of the Year.

At the 2019 Australian Independent Awards, Tell Me How You Really Feel won Best Independent Artist, Best Independent Album or EP.

== Track listing ==
All tracks are written by Courtney Barnett.

| No. | Title | Length |
|---|---|---|
| 1. | "Hopefulessness" | 4:48 |
| 2. | "City Looks Pretty" | 4:42 |
| 3. | "Charity" | 4:10 |
| 4. | "Need a Little Time" | 3:58 |
| 5. | "Nameless, Faceless" | 3:15 |
| 6. | "I'm Not Your Mother, I'm Not Your Bitch" | 1:50 |
| 7. | "Crippling Self-Doubt and a General Lack of Confidence" | 2:48 |
| 8. | "Help Your Self" | 3:02 |
| 9. | "Walkin' on Eggshells" | 4:01 |
| 10. | "Sunday Roast" | 4:44 |
| Total length: | | 37:16 |

Japan bonus tracks
| No. | Title | Length |
|---|---|---|
| 11. | "How to Boil an Egg" | 3:52 |
| 12. | "Swan St Swagger" | 2:45 |
| Total length: | | 43:57 |

== Personnel ==
Credits adapted from Bandcamp.

Musicians

- Courtney Barnett – guitar, vocals
- Bones Sloane – bass, backing vocals
- Dave Mudie – drums, percussion
- Dan Luscombe – keyboards, organ, guitar, backing vocals
- Kim Deal – backing vocals (tracks 5 and 7), guitar (track 7)
- Kelley Deal – backing vocals (track 7)

Production

- Courtney Barnett – production; Polaroids, artwork
- Burke Reid – production, recording, mixing
- Dan Luscombe – production
- Guy Davie – mastering

== Charts ==
| Chart (2018) | Peak position |
|---|---|
| Australian Albums (ARIA) | 2 |
| Austrian Albums (Ö3 Austria) | 44 |
| Belgian Albums (Ultratop Flanders) | 20 |
| Belgian Albums (Ultratop Wallonia) | 37 |
| Dutch Albums (Album Top 100) | 29 |
| French Albums (SNEP) | 30 |
| German Albums (Offizielle Top 100) | 24 |
| Irish Albums (IRMA) | 36 |
| Japanese Albums (Oricon) | 122 |
| New Zealand Albums (RMNZ) | 10 |
| Portuguese Albums (AFP) | 43 |
| Scottish Albums (Official Charts) | 5 |
| Spanish Albums (PROMUSICAE) | 55 |
| Swiss Albums (Schweizer Hitparade) | 19 |
| UK Albums (Official Charts) | 9 |
| US Billboard 200 | 22 |
| US Americana/Folk Albums (Billboard) | 1 |
| US Independent Albums (Billboard) | 3 |
| US Top Alternative Albums (Billboard) | 3 |
| US Top Rock Albums (Billboard) | 4 |
| US Vinyl Albums (Billboard) | 1 |
