= Things Take Time, Take Time =

Studio album by Courtney Barnett
- Released: 12 November 2021
- Recorded: 2020–2021
- Studios: Golden Retriever Studios (New South Wales); Melbourne and Northern (New South Wales)
- Genre: Indie rock
- Length: 33:58
- Labels: Milk!; Mom + Pop; Marathon Artists
- Producers: Courtney Barnett; Stella Mozgawa

Courtney Barnett chronology
Tell Me How You Really Feel (2018)	Things Take Time, Take Time (2021)	End of the Day (2023)

Singles from Things Take Time, Take Time
- 1. "Rae Street" Released: 7 July 2021; 2. "Before You Gotta Go" Released: 11 August 2021; 3. "Write a List of Things to Look Forward to" Released: 29 September 2021; 4. "If I Don't Hear from You Tonight" Released: 9 November 2021

Things Take Time, Take Time is the third studio album by Australian singer-songwriter Courtney Barnett. It was released on 12 November 2021 by Milk! Records, Mom + Pop Music and Marathon Artists.

At the AIR Awards of 2022, the album was nominated for Independent Album of the Year and won Best Independent Rock Album or EP.

At the 2022 ARIA Music Awards, the album earned Barnett a nomination for Best Solo Artist and was nominated for Best Independent Release and Best Produced Album.

== Recording and production ==
The album was recorded in Melbourne and Sydney from late 2020 to early 2021 with producer/drummer Stella Mozgawa. The Vinyl Factory called the album "a finely-woven collage of snapshots" and said it "dives into Barnett's own psyche to explore love, renewal, healing and self-discovering". The first single, "Rae Street", was released on 7 July 2021; the music video follows the residents of a suburban street, all of whom are played by Barnett. Later that day, Barnett released the 13-second non-album song "All Eyes on the Pavement" under the pseudonym Oliver Paul, the name of the protagonist of her 2015 song "Elevator Operator". The song was also released through a record label called A Crabby Mettle Neutron, an anagram of Barnett's full name.

The second single, "Before You Gotta Go", was released on 11 August; its music video was released on 13 September. The third single, "Write a List of Things to Look Forward to", was released with a music video on 29 September. "If I Don't Hear from You Tonight" was released on 9 November 2021, as the album's fourth single alongside 2022 Australian tour announcement.

== Critical reception ==
Professional ratings
Aggregate scores
Source	Rating
AnyDecentMusic?	7.6/10
Metacritic	79/100
Review scores
Source	Rating
AllMusic	3/5 stars
Clash	8/10
Consumer Guide	A-
Exclaim!	6/10
The Independent	4/5 stars
The Line of Best Fit	7/10
NME	4/5 stars
Pitchfork	6.5/10
Rolling Stone	4/5 stars
Slant Magazine	5/5 stars
Uncut	9/10

At Metacritic, Things Take Time, Take Time holds a score of 79/100, indicating generally favourable reviews. El Hunt from NME said "Partly as a consequence of being written and recorded during the pandemic Things Take Time, Take Time is sparer than Barnett's previous records, pairing jangly, lackadaisical indie-rock with scatterings of drum machine; programmed in collaboration with Warpaint's Stella Mozgawa. Though it lacks the more immediate bite of Barnett's previous work, its softness gives it a more tender focus."

=== Accolades ===
Things Take Time, Take Time on year-end lists
Publication	List	Rank	Ref.
Paste	The 50 Best Albums of 2021	49	

"Write A List of Things To Look Forward To" was included on Barack Obama's list of his favorite songs of 2021.

== Track listing ==
All tracks are written by Courtney Barnett.

Things Take Time, Take Time track listing
No.	Title	Length
1.	"Rae Street"	4:31
2.	"Sunfair Sundown"	2:45
3.	"Here's the Thing"	4:27
4.	"Before You Gotta Go"	3:45
5.	"Turning Green"	4:18
6.	"Take It Day by Day"	1:50
7.	"If I Don't Hear from You Tonight"	3:37
8.	"Write a List of Things to Look Forward To"	2:48
9.	"Splendour"	2:14
10.	"Oh the Night"	3:43
Total length:		33:58

== Personnel ==
Credits are adapted from the album's liner notes.

Musicians

- Courtney Barnett – vocals, guitars, strings, bass, piano, Omnichord, percussion, Wurlitzer; drums (track 10)
- Stella Mozgawa – drums, drum programming, percussion, bass, synths, vibraphone, Omnichord, sampler, tape delay; piano (track 10)
- Cate Le Bon – bass (track 7)
- Vagabon – vocals (track 10)
- Dave Mudie – vocals (track 6)
- Bones Sloane – vocals (track 6)
- Marek Mozgawa – handclaps (track 6)
- Chloe Dadd – handclaps (track 5)
- Simon Berckelman – tape delay (track 5)
- David Wrench – additional programming

Production

- Courtney Barnett – producer, artwork
- Stella Mozgawa – producer, assistant engineering
- Simon Berckelman – engineering
- Chloe Dadd – assistant engineering
- David Wrench – mixing
- Tim Pennells – assistant mixing
- Taylor Pollock – assistant mixing
- Grace Banks – assistant mixing
- Heba Kadry – mastering
- Danny Cohen – artwork photography
- Lily Paris West – artwork layout

== Charts ==
Chart performance for Things Take Time, Take Time
Chart (2021)	Peak position
Australian Albums (ARIA)	5
Belgian Albums (Ultratop Flanders)	50
German Albums (Offizielle Top 100)	38
New Zealand Albums (RMNZ)	18
Scottish Albums (Official Charts)	17
Swiss Albums (Schweizer Hitparade)	50
UK Albums (Official Charts)	31
UK Independent Albums (Official Charts)	6
US Billboard 200	200
US Independent Albums (Billboard)	36
US Top Alternative Albums (Billboard)	20
US Top Rock Albums (Billboard)	32
