= Avant Gardener =

Single by Courtney Barnett

from the EP How to Carve a Carrot into a Rose
- Released: 19 March 2013
- Length: 5:12
- Label: House Anxiety; Mom + Pop Music; Milk!
- Songwriter: Barnett

Courtney Barnett singles chronology
"Avant Gardener" (2013)	"History Eraser" (2013)

Music video
- "Avant Gardener" on YouTube

"Avant Gardener" is a song by the Australian musician Courtney Barnett, released as her debut single and a single from her 2013 extended play How to Carve a Carrot into a Rose, and later included on the 2013 compilation The Double EP: A Sea of Split Peas.

== Background and release ==
"Avant Gardener" has been seen as having Bob Dylan and the Byrds influences. The song itself tells a story of a woman who decides to get outside and do some weeding, but has a anaphylaxis induced panic attack soon after a conversation with a neighbour. The song had a music video released which showed a tennis match being played with a nonchalant umpire reading a book on Butch Cassidy and misses a tight line call, eventually leading to an on court fist fight.

== Critical reception ==
In a review of the single for Pitchfork, Mike Powell summarized it to be about "the story of a girl dragging her underemployed ass out of bed late on a Monday morning to try her hand at gardening-- at which point she suffers a panic attack. The Day critic Stephen Chupaska wrote that "Over a mild psychedelic groove and a delivery that is equal parts Liz Phar and Craig Finn, Barnett pulls out language cocktails[.]" claiming the title the "best song title of the year." Arnold Pan of PopMatters called it a "free-form, free-associating trip, capturing an eventfully boring day in Barnett’s so-called life that begins with her sleeping in on a Monday morning and ends with her in anaphylactic shock in an ambulance."

== Personnel ==
According to the CD single:

- Courtney Barnett – guitar, vocals
- Bones Sloane – high harmony vocals
- Jen Cloher – middle harmony vocals
- Dan Luscombe – guitar, low harmony vocals
- Alex Hamilton – guitar
- Pete Convery – bass
- Dave Mudle – drums
