= Lacuna (album) =

Studio album by Childhood
- Released: 11 August 2014
- Length: 45:54
- Label: Marathon Artists
- Producer: Dan Carey

Childhood chronology
Lacuna (2014)	Universal High (2017)

Singles from Lacuna
- 1. "As I Am" Released: 8 July 2014

Lacuna is the debut studio album by English band Childhood. It was released on 11 August 2014 under Marathon Artists.

== Critical reception ==
Professional ratings
Aggregate scores
Source	Rating
Metacritic	68/100
Review scores
Source	Rating
AllMusic	3.5/5 stars
DIY	4/5 stars
Drowned in Sound	7/10
NME	4/5 stars
Pitchfork	6.1/10
The Guardian	4/5 stars
Under The Radar	(7.5/10)
The Line of Best Fit	(8/10)
The Observer	3/5 stars

Lacuna was met with generally favorable reviews from critics. At Metacritic, which assigns a weighted average rating out of 100 to reviews from mainstream publications, this release received an average score of 68, based on 11 reviews.

Michael Hann of The Guardian, in a 4 out of 5 stars review, called Lacuna a "delightful, rippling, sun-drenched album", where there's "barely a misstep". Kyle MacNeil of DIY claimed "Although it may sound a bit like the deserted dance tent of a Star Trek festival, recording the album with Dan Carey amid smoke machines and lasers has been fantastic in making their sound a little bit fatter; while still retaining the glossy and woozy atmosphere that makes them so memorable." Lisa Wright of NME also praised the album saying, "Taking common inspiration and twisting it into their own shape, Childhood have concocted a debut that’s more than capable of standing up to the rougher approach of their geographical peers. In doing so, they’ve uncovered a diamond."

Ally Carnwath of The Observer claimed "London quartet Childhood were lumbered with Stone Roses comparisons after just one single, but they're more intriguing than that. There's enough in the circling guitar lines and dazed melodies of their debut album to induce reveries of late-80s British indie, but it's the ways they play against type that draw you in." Sam Moore of Drowned in Sound wrote "Lacuna, then, doesn’t quite fill in a gap completely on its own, but it does lay foundations for more to come. It’s clear that, especially now they’ve released Lacuna, Childhood are indeed making the right kind of noises that’ll ably assist them in making that important career leap from dreamy infancy to artistic maturity." Mack Hayden of Under The Radar took note that "When it comes to Childhood, their main point of difference from the other bands coming out from Brooklyn is a ceaseless tide of optimism in their music. They’re a bit like Wild Nothing with Mac DeMarco’s gap-toothed grin, expansive in their reverby soundscapes but never really weepy."

=== Accolades ===
Accolades for Lacuna
Publication	Accolade	Rank	Ref.
NME	Top 50 Albums of 2014	32	
Rough Trade	Top 100 Albums of 2014	56	
Under the Radar	Top 100 Albums of 2014	99	

== Track listing ==
Lacuna track listing
No.	Title	Length
1.	"Blue Velvet"	4:28
2.	"You Could Be Different"	3:54
3.	"As I Am"	3:36
4.	"Right Beneath Me"	4:12
5.	"Falls Away"	3:59
6.	"Sweeter Preacher"	2:51
7.	"Tides"	4:33
8.	"Solemn Skies"	5:18
9.	"Chiliad"	4:01
10.	"Pay for Cool"	4:13
11.	"When You Rise"	4:49

== Charts ==
Chart performance for Lacuna
Chart	Peak position
UK Albums (Official Charts)	87
UK Independent Albums (Official Charts)	12
