= Universal High =

Studio album by Childhood
- Released: 21 July 2017
- Length: 37:40
- Label: Marathon Artists
- Producer: Ben H. Allen

Childhood chronology
Lacuna (2014)	Universal High (2017)

Singles from Universal High
- 1. "Californian Light" Released: 28 April 2017

Professional ratings
Aggregate scores
Source	Rating
Metacritic	74/100
Review scores
Source	Rating
AllMusic	4/5 stars
Clash	6/10
DIY	4/5 stars
NME	4/5 stars
Paste	6.7/10

Universal High is the second and final studio album by English band Childhood. It was released on 21 July 2017 under Marathon Artists.

== Critical reception ==
Universal High was met with generally favourable reviews from critics. At Metacritic, which assigns a weighted average rating out of 100 to reviews from mainstream publications, this release received an average score of 74, based on 14 reviews.

== Track listing ==
Universal High track listing
No.	Title	Length
1.	"A.M.D."	4:14
2.	"Californian Light"	4:13
3.	"Cameo"	4:13
4.	"Too Old for My Tears"	2:38
5.	"Melody Says"	3:20
6.	"Universal High"	3:29
7.	"Understanding"	2:49
8.	"Don't Have Me Back"	3:49
9.	"Nothing Ever Seems Right"	3:39
10.	"Monitor"	5:16
