= Jamie Isaac =

English singer, songwriter and producer

- Origin: London, United Kingdom
- Genres: Alternative, Ambient, Folk, Jazz
- Years active: 2011–present
- Labels: Marathon Artists; House Anxiety
- Website: jamieisaac.com

Tom Cully, known professionally as Jamie Isaac, is an English singer, songwriter and producer.

Signed to House Anxiety /Marathon Artists, Isaac's debut EP, I Will Be Cold Soon, attracted attention for its near-choral incantations, minimalist jazz tones and post-rock layering. Isaac has been praised for using the power of silence with experimental and enveloping swaggering beats and his self-aware lyrics. His second EP, Blue Break, gained recognition for its soulful, piano-led sound. Featuring Jamie in The Guardian's New Music, Michael Cragg praised "Blue Break" for "favouring space and atmosphere over production histrionics".

In the run-up to the release of his debut album Couch Baby, Isaac presented the "Loose Grip" mixtape, a series of remixes of tracks taken from the album featuring collaborations with Rejjie Snow, King Krule under the moniker Edgar The Beatmaker, Jesse James Solomon, Jadasea, Black Mack, and Mr Malarky.

In January 2018, Jamie released "Doing Better" followed by "Wings" in March. He then announced the title of his next album (04:30 Idler), which was released on 1 June 2018. His single "(04:30) Idler / Sleep" was released on 23 May 2018. His third album "Please, Remember Me" was released in 2024, accompanied by the single "Dad's Cab".

== Life and career ==
Jamie Issac was born on 2 July 1994 in Croydon. He gained widespread identity as a featured soloist of the boys choir Libera performing in many concerts in the UK as well as many foreign tours. He attended the BRIT School alongside King Krule, the two have worked on many projects together since. He started making his own music in 2011 in his parents' home, and released a few online demos. After a friend of his invited him to do a few sessions in a studio, his music advanced rapidly, with people expressing an interest in his music. Isaac has always had an interest in film-making and script writing, saying that if it were not for music, those are the careers he probably would have pursued.

His influences come from jazz pianists such as Dave Brubeck, Bill Evans and Teddy Wilson and classical pianist Chopin as well as The Beach Boys.

Isaac describes his own music style as "brooding, cinematic and minimalist" and that he would never write a song without a piano line in it. He has released two EPs, namely I Will be Cold Soon and Blue Break, both of which have become well known.

In March 2017, he released Couch Baby (Revisited) featuring new track "Un-thinkable" and remixes from Wiki, Denzel Curry and Rejjie Snow, among others.

In January 2018, Isaac announced the title of his next single "Doing Better" on Instagram and later on posted a video on Twitter in the studio with the caption: "Mastering the album was up till 6am making sure this was perfect I need sleep." The video for "Doing Better" was released on 8 February 2018 and single released on 9 February 2018. Since then, the singles "Wings" and "Maybe" have been released, both with accompanying music videos. The album (4:30 Idler) was due for release on 1 June 2018.

On 17 January 2018, Isaac announced that he would be joining Nick Hakim on a six-date UK tour in February 2018.

== Discography ==
=== Album ===
Year	Title	Format	Released	Label
2016	Couch Baby	12" vinyl Digital / CD	8 July 2016	Marathon Artists
2017	Couch Baby (Revisited)	Digital / CD	11 March 2017	Marathon Artists
2018	(04:30) Idler	12" vinyl Digital / CD	1 June 2018	Marathon Artists
2024	Please, Remember Me	Digital	25 October 2024	Jamie Isaac

=== EP ===
Year	Title	Format	Released	Tracks	Label
2013	I Will Be Cold Soon	12" vinyl Digital	28 June 2013	"Can See, Pt. 1" "Softly Draining Seas" "I Will Be Cold Soon" "Hardened Front"	House Anxiety; Marathon Artists
2014	Blue Break	12" vinyl Digital	24 March 2014	"Blue Break" "She Dried" "Mother's Love Don't Stretch" "Can See (Part 2)"	House Anxiety; Marathon Artists

=== Mixtape ===
Year	Title	Format	Released	Tracks	Label
2016	Loose Grip	Digital	30 March 2016	01 "Last Drip" (Remix ft. Rejjie Snow); 02 "CNT U SEE" (Remix ft. Jadasea); 03 "Know U Like Me" (Edgar The Beatmaker Remix); 04 "CNT U SEE" (Mr Malarky Remix); 05 "Mother's Love Don't Stretch" (Remix ft. Jesse James Solomon); 06 "Staying With Me All Night" (Edgar The Beatmaker Remix); 07 "Find The Words" (JI Edit); 08 "All My Days" (Edgar The Beatmaker Remix); 09 "PINTY'S Interlude" (Remix ft. MC PINTY); 10 "Know U Like Me" (Rago Foot Remix ft. Jesse James Solomon)	"House Anxiety"; Marathon Artists
