= The Double EP: A Sea of Split Peas =

2013 album by Courtney Barnett

Compilation album by Courtney Barnett
- Released: 14 October 2013 (UK)
- Genres: Indie rock; anti-folk; psychedelia
- Length: 56:14
- Labels: House Anxiety; Mom + Pop Music

Courtney Barnett chronology
How to Carve a Carrot into a Rose (2013)	The Double EP: A Sea of Split Peas (2013)	Sometimes I Sit and Think, and Sometimes I Just Sit (2015)

Singles from The Double EP: A Sea of Split Peas
- 1. "Avant Gardener" Released: 19 March 2013

The Double EP: A Sea of Split Peas is a compilation by Australian rock musician Courtney Barnett which compiles two of her previous EPs: How to Carve a Carrot into a Rose (tracks 1–6) and I've Got a Friend Called Emily Ferris (tracks 7–12). It was released by Marathon Artists' House Anxiety Records on 14 October 2013 in the UK, and on the following day in the US.

== Composition ==
Mike Powell for Rolling Stone saw Barnett's sound as "jangly, rumpled" indie rock like that of Pavement and even recalling early Bob Dylan. It also digs into "freewheeling" anti-folk songs like on "History Eraser".

It is also rich in psychedelia sounds, from her "psychedelic-leaning guitar wails" to her "psych-smeared, full-band backing."

== Critical reception ==
Professional ratings
Review scores
Source	Rating
AllMusic	4/5 stars
Consequence	B
Cuepoint (Expert Witness)	(2-star Honorable Mention)
Louder Than War	8/10
NME	4/5 stars
Pitchfork	7.8/10
PopMatters	7/10
Rolling Stone	3/5 stars
Under the Radar	7.5/10

Rolling Stone's Mike Powell gave the EP 3 out of 5 stars, calling it "an informal introduction to an artist who probably has more to offer." In contrast, AllMusic's Scott Kerr was more favorable in his review of the EP, giving it 4 out of 5 stars and writing that "It's clear to see that together these EPs are an indicator of her wonderful songwriting talent."

== Track listing ==
All tracks are written by Courtney Barnett, except "Porcelain" (Barnett, Bob Harrow).

No.	Title	Length
1.	"Out of the Woodwork"	5:50
2.	"Don't Apply Compression Gently"	3:35
3.	"Avant Gardener"	5:12
4.	"History Eraser"	3:28
5.	"David"	2:53
6.	"Anonymous Club"	5:50
7.	"Lance Jr."	3:27
8.	"Are You Looking After Yourself?"	7:42
9.	"Scotty Says"	3:52
10.	"Canned Tomatoes (Whole)"	4:32
11.	"Porcelain"	7:07
12.	"Ode to Odetta"	2:46

== Personnel ==
All credits adapted from the EP's Bandcamp page.

How to Carve a Carrot into a Rose (2013)

Courtney Barnett and the Courtney Barnetts

- Courtney Barnett, Dave Mudie, Bones Sloane, Dan Luscombe, Alex Hamilton, Pete Convery, Bob Harrow

Technical

- Dan Luscombe – mixing (1, 2, 3, 6)
- Dann Hume – mixing (4 & 5)
- Simon Cotter – recording at Headgap
- Joe at Crystal – mastering

I've Got a Friend Called Emily Ferris (2012)

Courtney Barnett and the Courtney Barnetts

- Courtney Barnett, Brent DeBoer, Pete Convery, Alex Hamilton, Peter Lubulwa, Daniel Firth, Alex Francis, Bob Harrow

Technical

- Daniel Firth – recording, mixing
- Joe at Crystal – mastering

== Charts ==
Chart	Peak position
US Billboard 200	165
US Heatseekers Albums (Billboard)	2
US Americana/Folk Albums (Billboard)	6
