= Immigrant Union =

- Origin: Melbourne, Victoria, Australia
- Genre: Psychedelic folk
- Members: Brent DeBoer; Bob Harrow; Peter Lubulwa; Paddy McGrath-Lester; Ben Street
- Past members: Bones Sloane; Dave Mudie; Courtney Barnett

Immigrant Union are an Australian-American psychedelic folk and country supergroup from Melbourne. It consists of Brent DeBoer (from The Dandy Warhols), Bob Harrow, Peter Lubulwa, Ben Street and Paddy McGrath-Lester. Courtney Barnett and her band consisting of Dave Mudie and Bones Sloane were members of Immigrant Union from 2011 to 2013 and feature on their second studio album Anyway.
