= Creature of Habit (album) =

Studio album by Courtney Barnett
- Released: 27 March 2026
- Studios: Animal Rites (Los Angeles); Rancho de la Luna (Joshua Tree, California)
- Genre: Indie rock
- Length: 38:43
- Label: Mom + Pop
- Producers: John Congleton; Courtney Barnett; Stella Mozgawa; Marta Salogni

Courtney Barnett chronology
End of the Day (2023)	Creature of Habit (2026)

Singles from Creature of Habit
- 1. "Stay in Your Lane" Released: 15 October 2025; 2. "Site Unseen" Released: 20 January 2026; 3. "Mantis" / "Sugar Plum" Released: 25 February 2026; 4. "One Thing at a Time" Released: 24 March 2026

Creature of Habit is the fourth studio album by Australian singer-songwriter Courtney Barnett. It was announced in January 2026 and was released on 27 March 2026 by Mom + Pop Music.

The album was written after Barnett relocated from Melbourne to Los Angeles and following the disestablishment of her record label Milk! Records in 2023.

At the 2026 ARIA Music Awards, it was nominated for Best Rock Album.

The album was shortlisted for the 2026 Australian Music Prize.

== Critical reception ==
Professional ratings
Aggregate scores
Source	Rating
AnyDecentMusic?	7.5/10
Metacritic	80/100
Review scores
Source	Rating
AllMusic	3.5/5 stars
Clash	8/10
DIY	3.5/5 stars
Mojo	4/5 stars
MusicOMH	4/5 stars
Paste	B
PopMatters	9/10
Record Collector	4/5 stars
The Skinny	3/5 stars
Uncut	8/10

According to the review aggregator Metacritic, Creature of Habit received "generally favorable reviews" based on a weighted average score of 80 out of 100 from fifteen critic scores. The review aggregator AnyDecentMusic? gave the album a weighted average score of 7.5 out of 10 from sixteen critic scores.

== Track listing ==
All tracks are written by Courtney Barnett, except the music of "Mantis" (Barnett, Stella Mozgawa).

No.	Title	Length
1.	"Stay in Your Lane"	3:14
2.	"Wonder"	3:43
3.	"Site Unseen" (featuring Waxahatchee)	2:46
4.	"Mostly Patient"	3:32
5.	"One Thing at a Time"	4:42
6.	"Mantis"	4:40
7.	"Sugar Plum"	4:35
8.	"Same"	3:27
9.	"Great Advice"	2:39
10.	"Another Beautiful Day"	5:25
Total length:		38:43

== Personnel ==
Credits are adapted from the album's liner notes.

=== Musicians ===
- Courtney Barnett – guitars, vocals (all tracks), bass (7), drum programming (8), Wurlitzer (10)
- Stella Mozgawa – drums, percussion (all tracks), bass (4), piano (2, 10), synthesiser (2, 3, 9), bass synthesizer, drum programming (5), Omnichord (6)
- Zach Dawes – bass (1, 3)
- Bones Sloane – bass (2, 6, 8–10), bass synthesizer (5), Wurlitzer (10)
- Waxahatchee – vocals (3)
- Flea – bass (5)
- Floating Points – synthesizer (8)

=== Technical and design ===
- John Congleton – production, engineering, mixing (all tracks)
- Courtney Barnett – production (2, 4–10), artwork
- Stella Mozgawa – production (2, 4–10)
- Marta Salogni – production, engineering (2, 6, 8–10), additional engineering (5)
- Rachel White – engineering assistance (1)
- Omar Yakar Jr. – engineering assistance (2, 8–10), additional engineering (5, 6)
- Brad Cook – additional engineering (3)
- Heba Kadry – mastering in New York City (all tracks)
- Regrets Only – artwork
- Lilo Hess – photograph

== Charts ==
Chart performance for Creature of Habit
Chart (2026)	Peak position
Australian Albums (ARIA)	19
Belgian Albums (Ultratop Flanders)	186
Belgian Albums (Ultratop Wallonia)	159
Dutch Vinyl Albums (Dutch Charts)	29
French Physical Albums (SNEP)	44
New Zealand Albums (RMNZ)	34
Scottish Albums (Official Charts)	10
UK Albums (Official Charts)	29
UK Independent Albums (Official Charts)	6
US Top Album Sales (Billboard)	25
