= End of the Day (Courtney Barnett album) =

Film score by Courtney Barnett
- Released: 8 September 2023
- Recorded: 2021
- Length: 40:16
- Label: Milk!; Mom + Pop
- Producer: Courtney Barnett; Stella Mozgawa

Courtney Barnett chronology
Things Take Time, Take Time (2021)	End of the Day (2023)	Creature of Habit (2026)

End of the Day is an instrumental album by Australian musician Courtney Barnett, originally composed as the film score for the 2021 documentary film about Barnett, Anonymous Club. It was released on 8 September 2023 through Milk! Records and Mom + Pop Music. Barnett improvised the album alongside drummer Stella Mozgawa as they watched director Danny Cohen's final edit of Anonymous Club.

== Background and recording ==
While originally conceived as the score to the 2021 biographical documentary film Anonymous Club that followed Barnett, the album was reworked to form a single piece of music. Barnett and drummer Stella Mozgawa's "one guiding principle" as they recorded the score was "nothing too maudlin, obvious, or instructive, nothing to tell the future audience how they should be feeling about Barnett's life onscreen".

== Critical reception ==
Professional ratings
Aggregate scores
Source	Rating
Metacritic	66/100
Review scores
Source	Rating
The Line of Best Fit	7/10
Mojo	3/5 stars
The Skinny	3/5 stars
Uncut	7/10

End of the Day received a score of 66 out of 100 on review aggregator Metacritic based on five critics' reviews, indicating "generally favorable" reception. Uncut commented that the album is "held together by a unifying drone" and a "welcome if unusual addition to Barnett's catalogue", while The Line of Best Fit's Amaya Lim stated that while Barnett "previously depended on frank and revealing lyrical turns to convey emotion, she here demonstrates that she can do the same with only her instrument" and "proves that she is a master at her craft, striking gold again with her new foray into scoring".

Mojo wrote that "in places it verges on doodling, as if Barnett is endlessly tuning her guitar, but tracks such as Intro or Tiver sound darkly majestic, like deep, drifting hollowed-out Americana". Logan Walker of The Skinny felt that "as a standalone record, End of the Day does not always justify its existence. Some tracks are simply too empty, leaving a noticeable divide between audience and artist".

== Track listing ==
All tracks are written by Courtney Barnett and Stella Mozgawa.

End of the Day track listing
No.	Title	Length
1.	"Start Somewhere"	2:11
2.	"Life Balance"	3:20
3.	"First Slow"	1:44
4.	"A to B"	1:59
5.	"(Electricity)"	2:04
6.	"Two Circles Reflecting"	1:15
7.	"End of the Day"	4:58
8.	"Floating Down"	1:43
9.	"Spring Ascends"	1:03
10.	"Intro"	3:31
11.	"B to C"	1:40
12.	"Like Water"	1:59
13.	"Gold Room"	1:24
14.	"Sun Through"	0:22
15.	"River"	3:31
16.	"Get on with It"	5:44
17.	"Eternity Repeat"	1:48
Total length:		40:16

== Personnel ==
- Courtney Barnett – production, guitars
- Stella Mozgawa – production, synthesizer
- Heba Kadry – mastering
- Callum Barter – mixing
- Guus Hoevenaars – engineering
