= Childhood (band) =

2010s English rock band

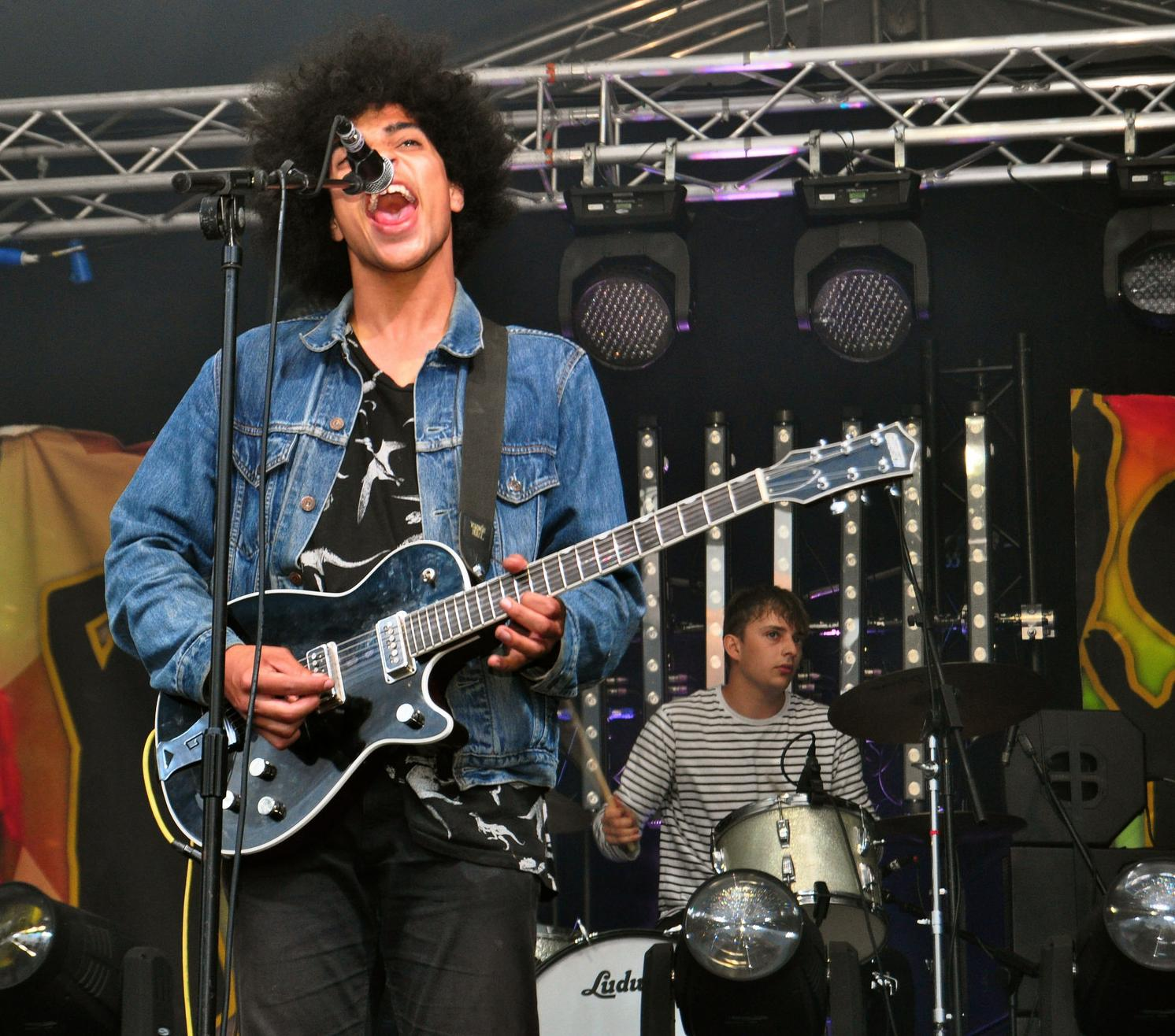
- Childhood at Rhythms of the World Festival, Hitchin 2014

Background information
- Origin: Nottingham, England
- Genres: Indie pop, lo-fi, indie rock
- Years active: 2010-2018
- Label: Marathon Artists / House Anxiety
- Past members: Ben Romans-Hopcraft; Leo Dobsen; Jonny Williams; Max Danieli-Fantin; Thomas "Tomaski" Fiquet; Chris O'Driscoll; Daniel Ajegbo; Daniel Salamons

Childhood were an English rock band, formed in 2010 in Nottingham by South Londoners Ben Romans-Hopcraft and Leo Dobsen while studying at the University of Nottingham.

The duo first gained attention after uploading a couple of demos online. After recruiting bassist Daniel Salamons and drummer Daniel Ajegbo, the band gigged around Nottingham before signing to Marathon Artists / House Anxiety and released their debut single Blue Velvet in October 2012. Following the departure of Daniel Ajegbo and re-basing themselves in South London, the band recruited Jonny Williams and released second single Solemn Skies on 10 June 2013. The single was produced by Rory Attwell, formerly of Test Icicles.

The band released their debut album Lacuna on 11 August 2014. Produced by Dan Carey, the album was preceded by the single Falls Away in June.

On 24 April 2015, the band revealed that Thomas Fiquet was now the band's bass player - despite updating the band's lineup information on their Facebook page, the band never announced or commented on the departure of Daniel Salamons.

On 21 July 2017, the band released their second album Universal High. The album was preceded by single 'Californian Light' in April 2017 and second single "Cameo" in June 2017. Recorded the previous summer in Atlanta, USA at Maze Studios with Ben H Allen III, the album was less collaborative than their debut, with Romans-Hopcraft admitting that although he "would never call it a solo project" that "for this record, we all tried to collaborate and it never really worked, so it ended up coming from this one funnel – then everyone added their own thing".

The band quietly disbanded in 2018, with Romans-Hopcraft going on to play bass with Insecure Men and Warmduscher. He is also currently working on a new project with Sean Lennon producing.

Original bassist Daniel Salamons continues to work as a session player. The band's second bassist Thomas Fiquet has gone on to join Swim Deep.

== Discography ==
=== Singles ===
Year	Title	Format	Released	Tracks
2012	Blue Velvet	Digital; 7" vinyl	19 October 2012	"Blue Velvet" "Bond Girls"
2013	Solemn Skies	Digital; 10" vinyl	10 June 2013	"Solemn Skies" "Semester" "Solemn Skies (Sonic Boom Remix)"
2014	Falls Away	Digital	2 June 2014	"Falls Away"
2017	Californian Light	Digital	27 April 2017	"Californian Light"
2017	Cameo	Digital	28 June 2017	"Cameo"

=== Albums ===
Year	Title	Chart		Released	Label
2014	Lacuna	UK Independent Albums	12	11 August 2014	Marathon Artists
2017	Universal High	UK Independent Albums	13	21 July 2017	Marathon Artists

== Former Members ==
- Ben Romans-Hopcraft – lead vocals, guitar (2010–2018)
- Leo Dobsen – guitar (2010–2018)
- Thomas "Tomaski" Fiquet – bass guitar (2015–2018)
- Max Danieli-Fantin – keyboard, synthesizer, backing vocals (2014–2018)
- Jonny Williams – drums (2013–2018)
- Daniel Ajegbo – drums (2010–2012)
- Chris O'Driscoll – drums (2012–2013)
- Daniel Salamons – bass guitar (2011–2015)
