= Brent DeBoer =

American singer-songwriter

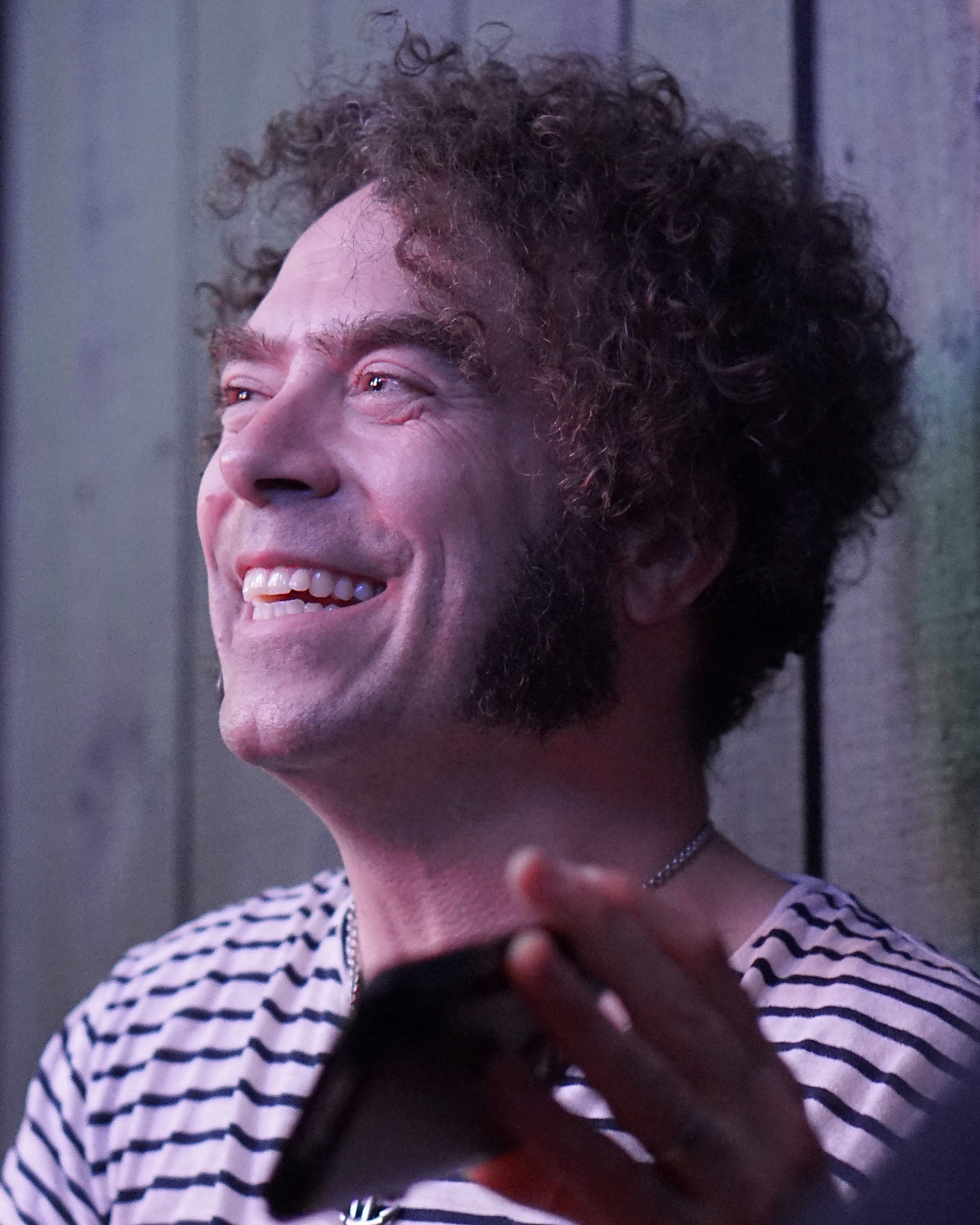
- DeBoer of The Dandy Warhols after a concert in Austin, Texas

Background information
- Also known as: Fathead
- Born: February 20, 1975 (age 51); Portland, Oregon, U.S.
- Genres: Folk rock; alternative rock; neo-psychedelia
- Instruments: Vocals; drums; guitar; bass guitar
- Member of: The Dandy Warhols; Immigrant Union; The Mutants; Super American Eagle

Brent DeBoer (born February 20, 1975) is an American singer-songwriter from Portland, Oregon. He is a member of the bands The Dandy Warhols, Immigrant Union, and Super American Eagle and released a solo studio album, The Farmer, in 2010. DeBoer now lives in Melbourne, Australia, with his wife Sarah and two children.

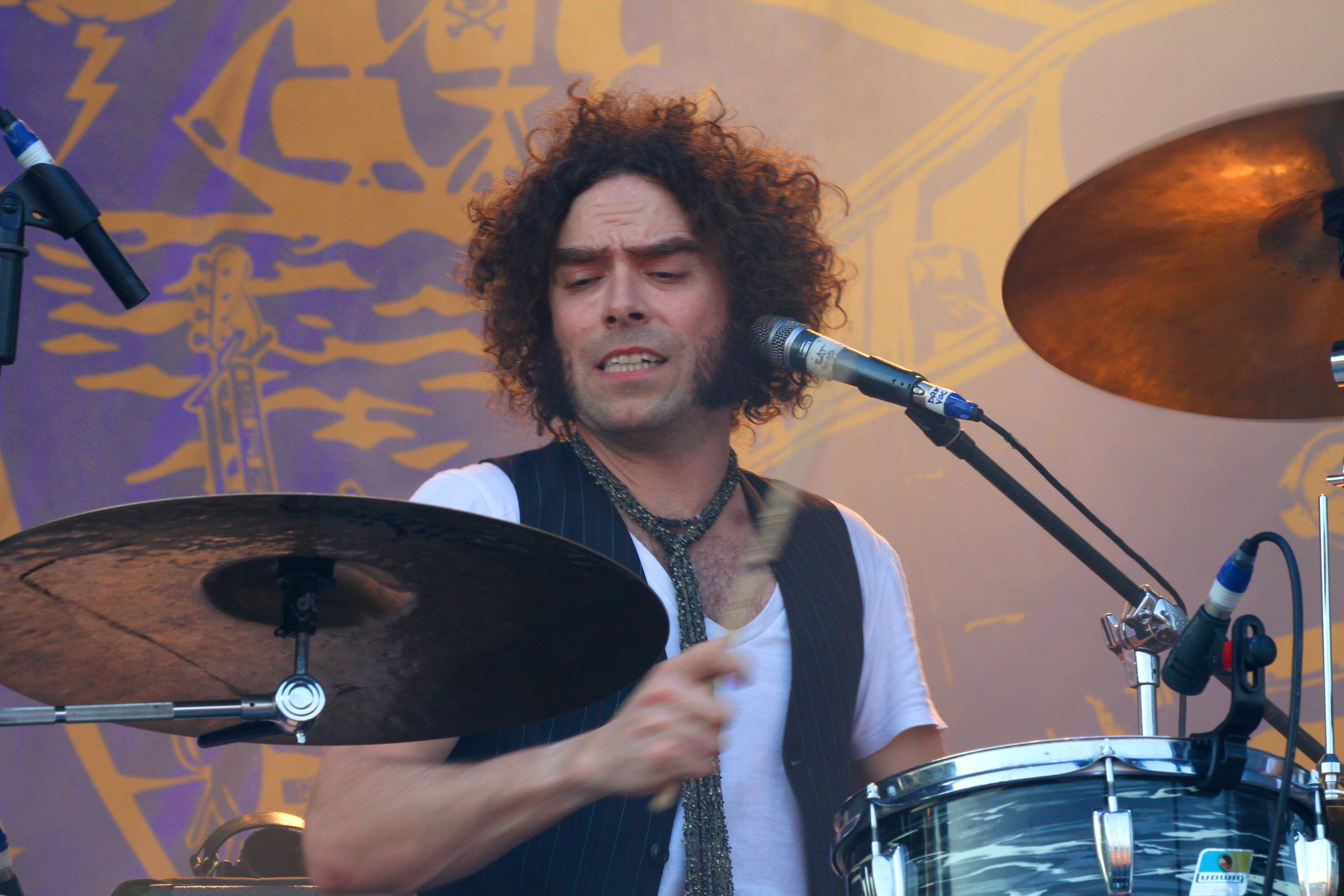
DeBoer drumming at the 2012 Frequency Festival.

DeBoer joined The Dandy Warhols in 1998, after the original drummer Eric Hedford left the band.

== Personal life ==
He is a cousin of bandmate Courtney Taylor-Taylor. At the age of five he received his first drum set for Christmas.

DeBoer has contributed funds to the National Multiple Sclerosis Society as well as Pink and Blue for Two.
