= Sometimes I Sit and Think, and Sometimes I Just Sit =

Studio album by Courtney Barnett
- Released: 20 March 2015
- Recorded: April 2014
- Studio: Head Gap (Preston, Victoria)
- Genres: Indie rock; slacker rock
- Length: 43:29
- Labels: Milk!; Marathon; House Anxiety; Mom + Pop
- Producers: Courtney Barnett; Burke Reid; Dan Luscombe

Courtney Barnett chronology
The Double EP: A Sea of Split Peas (2013)	Sometimes I Sit and Think, and Sometimes I Just Sit (2015)	Lotta Sea Lice (2017)

Singles from Sometimes I Sit and Think, and Sometimes I Just Sit
- 1. "Pedestrian at Best" Released: 16 February 2015; 2. "Kim's Caravan" Released: 18 April 2015; 3. "Dead Fox" Released: 11 May 2015; 4. "Nobody Really Cares If You Don't Go to the Party" Released: 7 August 2015

Sometimes I Sit and Think, and Sometimes I Just Sit is the debut studio album by Australian indie rock musician Courtney Barnett, released on 20 March 2015. The album received wide acclaim and was ranked as one of the best albums of 2015 by numerous publications.

== Background and recording ==
After playing with various bands in Melbourne, Barnett used money that she had borrowed from her grandmother to start her own Milk! Records label and released her first EP, I've Got a Friend Called Emily Ferris (2012). Following that release, Barnett signed to Marathon Artists (via its House Anxiety imprint). In August 2013, Marathon Artists released The Double EP: A Sea of Split Peas, packaging the first EP with Barnett's second, How To Carve A Carrot into a Rose. The Double EP brought Barnett international critical acclaim, with the lead single, "Avant Gardener", named 'Best New Track' by Pitchfork in 2013. How To Carve A Carrot was released on a limited run by Milk! Records as a standalone EP in October 2013. In 2014, Marathon Artists partnered with Mom + Pop Music for the US release of The Double EP.

Barnett had spent a year writing songs for her album but only showed them to her band a week before they were recorded in order to capture a "fresh" sound. The song "Pedestrian at Best" was written "at the last minute" and the recorded version was the first time that Barnett had sung the words out loud. The album was largely recorded over eight days in Melbourne in April 2014 but the release was delayed due to touring commitments. Some early promo copies were distributed in Europe in mid-December 2014, and Barnett unveiled the album at the 2015 South by Southwest music festival in March and then embarked on a world tour beginning in Paris.

In the liner notes, Barnett reveals that the album's title was inspired by a poster that hung in her grandmother's bathroom. It is also used as part of the lyrics of the hidden/bonus song "Stair Androids & Valley Um..."

== Critical reception ==
Professional ratings
Aggregate scores
Source	Rating
AnyDecentMusic?	8.3/10
Metacritic	88/100
Review scores
Source	Rating
AllMusic	5/5 stars
The A.V. Club	A−
Chicago Tribune	4/4 stars
Cuepoint (Expert Witness)	A
The Guardian	5/5 stars
Los Angeles Times	3.5/4 stars
NME	8/10
Pitchfork	8.6/10
Rolling Stone	4.5/5 stars
Spin	9/10

Sometimes I Sit and Think, and Sometimes I Just Sit received widespread acclaim from music critics. At Metacritic, which assigns a normalised rating out of 100 to reviews from mainstream critics, the album received an average score of 88, based on 35 reviews. In a review for AllMusic, Stephen Thomas Erlewine called it "invigorating", saying that it provided a "convincing argument that rock & roll doesn't need reinvention in order to revive itself." Mike Powell of Pitchfork awarded the album a 'Best New Music' accolade, saying that "Barnett has nothing to prove and she's proving it." DIY magazine's Jamie Milton called the record "exceptional" and said "make no mistake - this is a debut like few others." Eric R. Danton, reviewing the album for Paste magazine, said that Sometimes I Sit and Think, and Sometimes I Just Sit was "one of the most compulsively listenable albums to come out so far this year." Everett True wrote in The Guardian that the album improves upon each listen because "it's been a while since western rock music – let alone Melbourne's fiercely insular and often too-precious indie scene – has thrown up a songwriter and lyricist as intriguing, compelling and down-to-earth, yet surreal and morbidly funny, as Barnett." In Cuepoint, Robert Christgau said Barnett's music has a "drive and focus" it did not have before, complemented by her passionate singing and a lyrical style reminiscent of John Prine and Jens Lekman but still "herself": "Formally, her songs are confessional, only they describe her material life and conflicted feelings acutely rather than dreamily, so that the songs occur in and are inflected by a deftly rendered physical and social world."

In a less enthusiastic review, Christopher Monk of musicOMH called Sometimes I Sit and Think, and Sometimes I Just Sit "a likeable, enjoyable album rather than a great one", writing that "the craft of Barnett's words dwarfs that of her music...there are too many compositions here that feel underwritten."

Rolling Stone ranked "Pedestrian at Best" at number 4 on its annual year-end list to find the best songs of 2015.

=== Accolades ===
Sometimes I Sit and Think, And Sometimes I Just Sit received eight nominations at the ARIA Music Awards of 2015, including for Album of the Year, Best Rock Album and Best Independent Release. On 7 October, Barnett won the ARIA Award for Best Cover Art, part of the artisan ARIA awards, for her self drawn cover. On 26 November, Barnett also won Best Female Artist, Breakthrough Artist and Best Independent Release. She lost to Tame Impala's Currents for Album of the Year and Best Rock Album. Barnett was nominated for Best New Artist at the 2016 Grammy Awards.

Barnett was announced as the winner of the 2015 Australian Music Prize award which is given for the best Australian album release of the year.

At the J Awards of 2015, the album won Australian Album of the Year.

Publication	Accolade	Rank	Ref.
The A.V. Club	The 15 Best Albums of 2015	9	
The Guardian	The Best Albums of 2015	7	
NME	NME'S Albums of the Year 2015	22	
Pitchfork	The 50 Best Albums of 2015	9	
Pitchfork	Readers' Top 50 Albums 2015	7	
Pitchfork	The 200 Best Albums of the 2010s	67	
Rough Trade	Albums of the Year 2015	3	
Stereogum	The 50 Best Albums of 2015	6	
Stereogum	The 100 Best Albums of the 2010s	97	

== Track listing ==
All tracks are written by Courtney Barnett, and arranged by Barnett, Bones Sloane, Dave Mudie and Dan Luscombe.

No.	Title	Length
1.	"Elevator Operator"	3:14
2.	"Pedestrian at Best"	3:50
3.	"An Illustration of Loneliness (Sleepless in New York)"	3:10
4.	"Small Poppies"	7:00
5.	"Depreston"	4:52
6.	"Aqua Profunda!"	2:00
7.	"Dead Fox"	3:33
8.	"Nobody Really Cares If You Don't Go to the Party"	2:46
9.	"Debbie Downer"	3:16
10.	"Kim's Caravan"	6:46
11.	"Boxing Day Blues"	3:02
12.	"Stair Androids & Valley Um..."	6:33
Total length:		43:29

== Personnel ==
Credits are adapted from liner notes of Sometimes I Sit and Think, and Sometimes I Just Sit.

Musicians

- Courtney Barnett – guitar, vocals
- Dave Mudie – drums, percussion, vocals
- Bones Sloane – bass, vocals
- Dan Luscombe – guitar, vocals

Production

- Courtney Barnett – production, artwork
- Burke Reid – production, engineering, mixing
- Dan Luscombe – production, mixing
- Guy Davie – mastering
- Tajette O'Halloran – photography

== Charts ==
=== Weekly charts ===
Chart (2015)	Peak position
Australian Albums (ARIA)	4
Belgian Albums (Ultratop Flanders)	55
Belgian Albums (Ultratop Wallonia)	80
Dutch Albums (Album Top 100)	26
Irish Albums (IRMA)	28
French Albums (SNEP)	91
German Albums (Offizielle Top 100)	73
New Zealand Albums (RMNZ)	19
Swiss Albums (Schweizer Hitparade)	66
UK Albums (Official Charts)	16
US Billboard 200	20
US Digital Albums (Billboard)	11
US Americana/Folk Albums (Billboard)	1
US Independent Albums (Billboard)	1
US Top Alternative Albums (Billboard)	1
US Top Rock Albums (Billboard)	1
US Indie Store Album Sales (Billboard)	2
US Vinyl Albums (Billboard)	1

=== Year-end charts ===
Chart (2015)	Position
Australian Albums (ARIA)	39
US Top Rock Albums (Billboard)	56

== Certifications ==
Region	Certification	Certified units/sales
Australia (ARIA)	Gold	35,000^{^}
United Kingdom (BPI)	Silver	60,000^{‡}
^{^} Shipments figures based on certification alone.^{‡} Sales+streaming figures based on certification alone.
