= Paul-René Albertini =

French record producer

Paul-René Albertini (born 1964) is a global music industry executive.

== Biography ==
He graduated from the Institut Superieur de Gestion (ISG) and started his career in music in 1982 with the magazine The Actuel magazine as a concert promoter and independent record producer in Paris. From 1984, he served as Polygram France’s International Label Manager and then in 1986 became Marketing Director for Barclay Records. Three years later, Albertini was made Managing Director of Mercury France, a division of Polygram.

In 199,1 he was made Chief Executive Officer of Polygram Disques, the leading company in France with more than 30% of the market share. In 1993, Paul-René graduated from the senior executive course of the Harvard Business School ISMP.

In 1995, Albertini became President and CEO of Sony Music France. Under his tenure the company’s market share went from 22% in 1995 to 31% in 1998, at which time he became Executive Vice President of Sony Music Entertainment Europe.

In 2000, Albertini joined Warner Music Group as President of Warner Music Europe and in September 2002 was appointed President of Warner Music International, where, from the London headquarters, he oversaw the company’s 37 affiliates and numerous licensees throughout the world. From 2004, he continued in this role with the title of Chairman and CEO of Warner Music International, overseeing one of the biggest restructurings in the company's history. He was also a Director of Warner Music Group which was listed at the NYSE in 2005.

After he left Warner Music, in 2007 Paul-Rene set up an international consulting practice providing services to the music industry and private equity companies in the UK, Germany and Japan. He also oversaw the development of several digital platforms in Japan and the UK via Square Media International, Sushi Venture Partners which launched StartupBootcamp Israel and Marathon Artists.
