= Courtney Barnett =

Australian singer-songwriter and rock guitarist (born 1987)

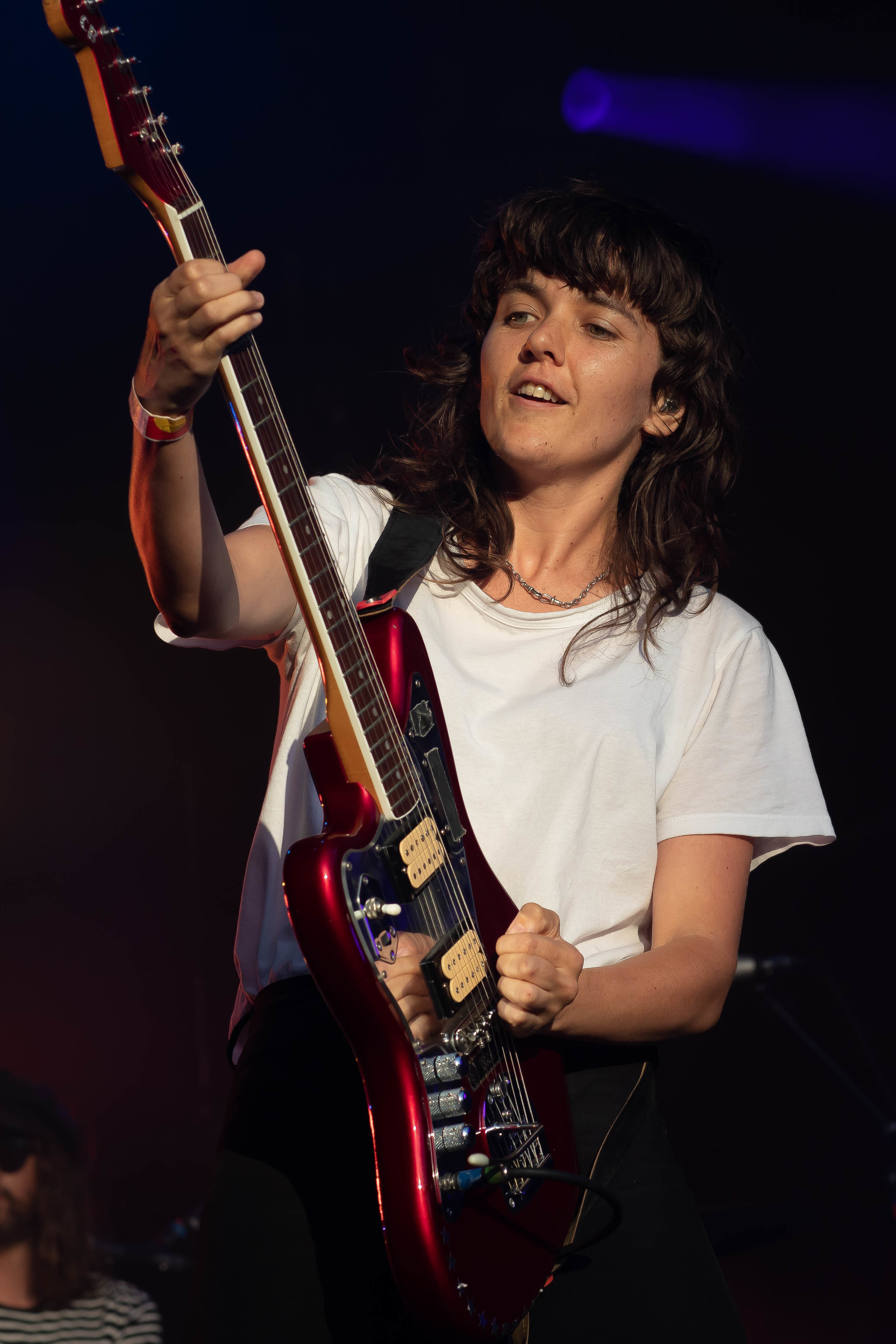
- Barnett performing in February 2019

Background information
- Born: Courtney Melba Barnett; 3 November 1987 (age 39); Sydney, Australia
- Origin: Melbourne, Australia
- Genres: Indie rock; alternative rock; dolewave; slacker rock
- Occupations: Singer; songwriter; musician
- Instruments: Vocals; guitar; piano
- Years active: 2009–present
- Labels: Matador; Milk!; Marathon; Mom + Pop; House Anxiety
- Website: courtneybarnett.com.au

Courtney Melba Barnett (born 3 November 1987) is an Australian singer, songwriter, and musician. Known for her deadpan singing style and witty, rambling lyrics, she attracted attention with the release of her debut EP I've Got a Friend Called Emily Ferris in 2012. International interest came with the release of her compilation album The Double EP: A Sea of Split Peas in 2013.

Barnett's debut studio album—Sometimes I Sit and Think, and Sometimes I Just Sit—was released in 2015 to widespread acclaim. At the 2015 ARIA Music Awards, she won four awards from eight nominations. She was nominated for Best New Artist at the 58th Annual Grammy Awards and International Female Solo Artist at the 2016 Brit Awards. She released Lotta Sea Lice, a collaborative album with Kurt Vile, in 2017. She released her second solo album, Tell Me How You Really Feel, to further acclaim in 2018. Barnett has since released two more studio albums, Things Take Time, Take Time in November 2021 and Creature of Habit in March 2026.

== Early life ==
Courtney Melba Barnett was born in Sydney on 3 November 1987. She was given her middle name after opera singer Nellie Melba. She grew up in Sydney's Northern Beaches area. Her mother was a ballerina. She has an older brother. When she was 16, her family moved to Hobart. She attended St Michael's Collegiate School and the Tasmanian School of Art. Having grown up listening to American bands, she discovered Australian singer-songwriters Darren Hanlon and Dan Kelly, who inspired her to start writing songs. While pursuing a music career, she worked as a pizza delivery driver.

== Career ==
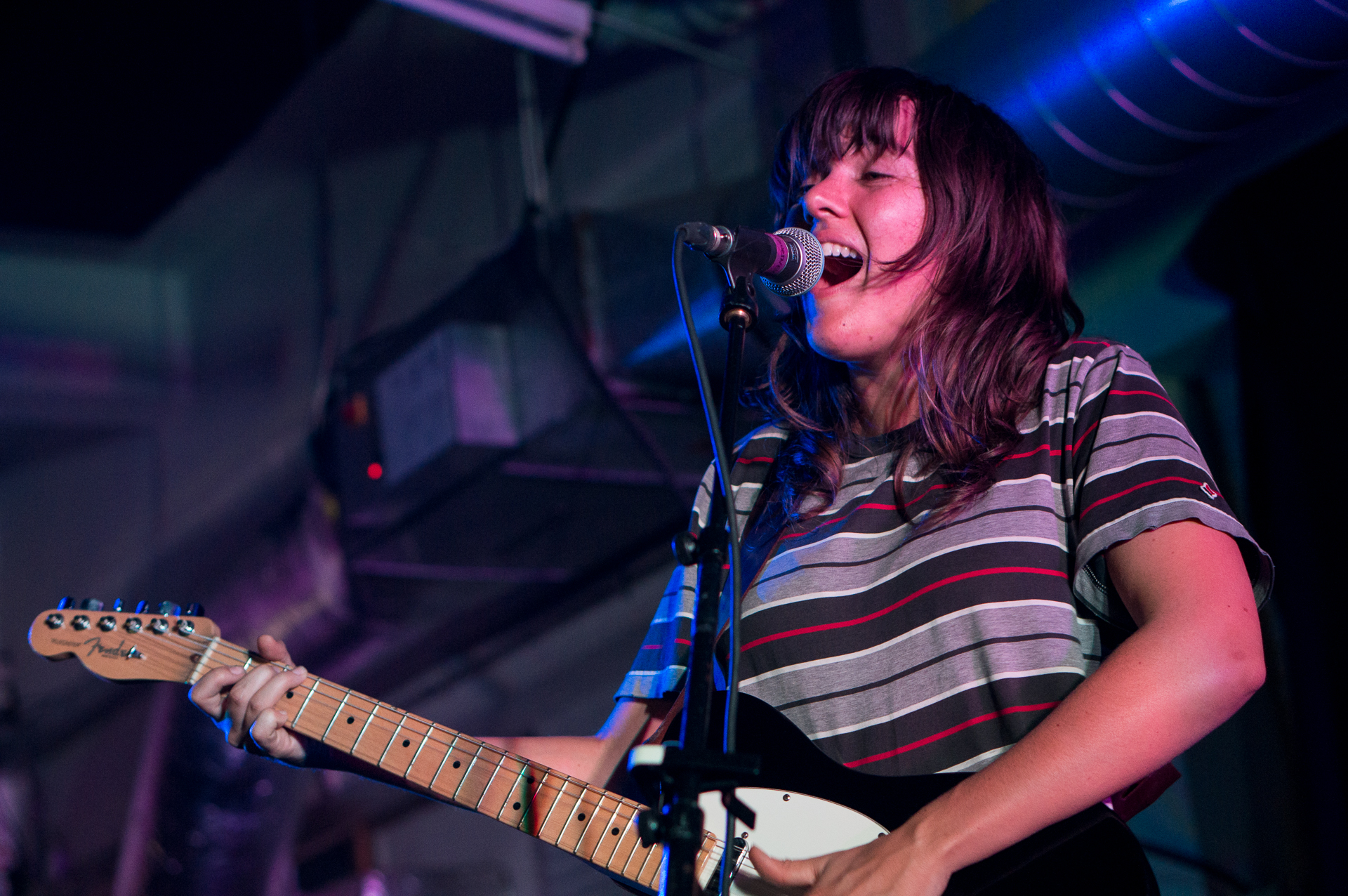
Barnett performing in March 2015

From 2010 to 2011, Barnett played second guitar in Melbourne grunge band Rapid Transit. They released one self-titled album on cassette. She recorded many early versions of her songs with a band called Courtney Barnett and the Olivettes, which was later shortened to the Olivettes. They released a live EP demo CD, with 100 copies being produced which were hand numbered. Around this time Barnett featured on a track by Melbourne singer-songwriter Giles Field called "I Can't Hear You, We're Breaking Up" which was released in late 2011. She also has a credit as co-writer on the song.

Between 2011 and 2013, Barnett was a member of Australian psych-country band Immigrant Union, a musical project founded by Brent DeBoer (of The Dandy Warhols) and Bob Harrow. Along with sharing vocal duties, Barnett predominantly played slide guitar and is on the band's second studio album, Anyway. DeBoer played drums on Barnett's first EP, I've Got a Friend called Emily Ferris. It appeared in 2012 on Barnett's own label, Milk! Records.

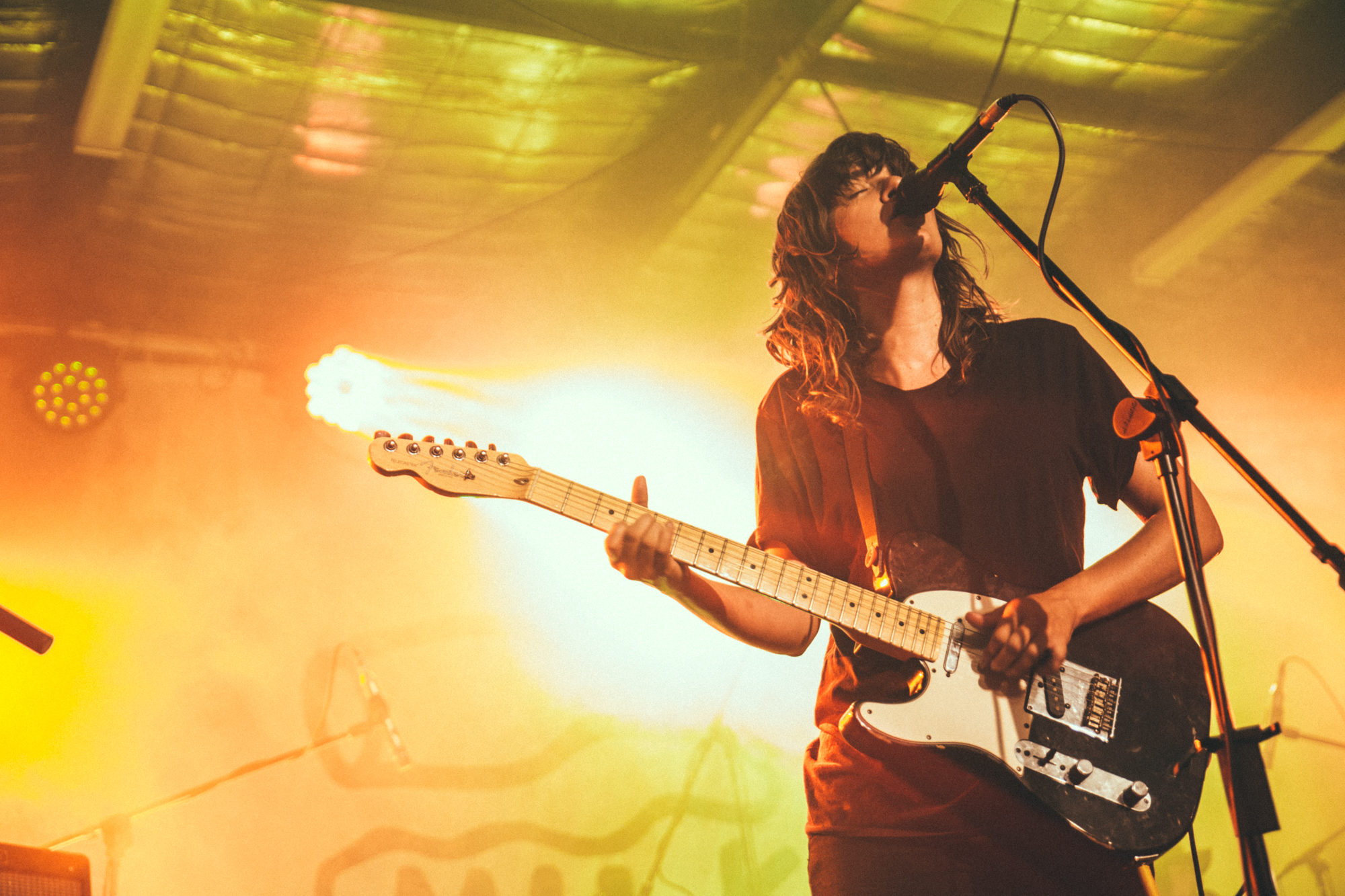
Barnett performing in March 2016

In 2013, Barnett played lead guitar on Jen Cloher's third studio album, In Blood Memory, which was also released on Milk! Records. Following the release of her first EP, Barnett signed to Marathon Artists (via its imprint House Anxiety). In August 2013, Marathon Artists released The Double EP: A Sea of Split Peas, a combined package of Barnett's first EP and her second EP, How to Carve a Carrot Into a Rose. The Double EP brought Barnett international critical acclaim, with "Avant Gardener", the lead single, named Track of the Day by Q Magazine and Best New Track by Pitchfork in 2013. It was named the album of the week by Stereogum The track "History Eraser" was nominated for the APRA Song of the Year. How to Carve a Carrot into a Rose was released on a limited run by Milk! Records as a standalone EP in October 2013. Marathon Artists and House Anxiety partnered with Mom + Pop Music for the U.S. release of The Double EP in 2014.

Milk! Records released a compilation EP, A Pair of Pears (with Shadows), on 10" white vinyl in September 2014, following a crowd-sourcing campaign in July that year. The EP included a Barnett track, "Pickles from the Jar", the song was voted in at number 51 in Triple J's Hottest 100 for 2014.

On 30 January 2015, Barnett released details on her upcoming full-length album, recorded in April 2014 with Burke Reid, along with two singles, "Pedestrian at Best" and "Depreston", and accompanying music videos. The music video for "Pedestrian at Best" features Cloher and Fraser A Gorman. Her debut album—Sometimes I Sit and Think, and Sometimes I Just Sit—was released worldwide via Milk! Records (Australia), and Mom + Pop Music (US) on 23 March 2015, and was accompanied by tours in the UK and Europe, America, and Australasia.

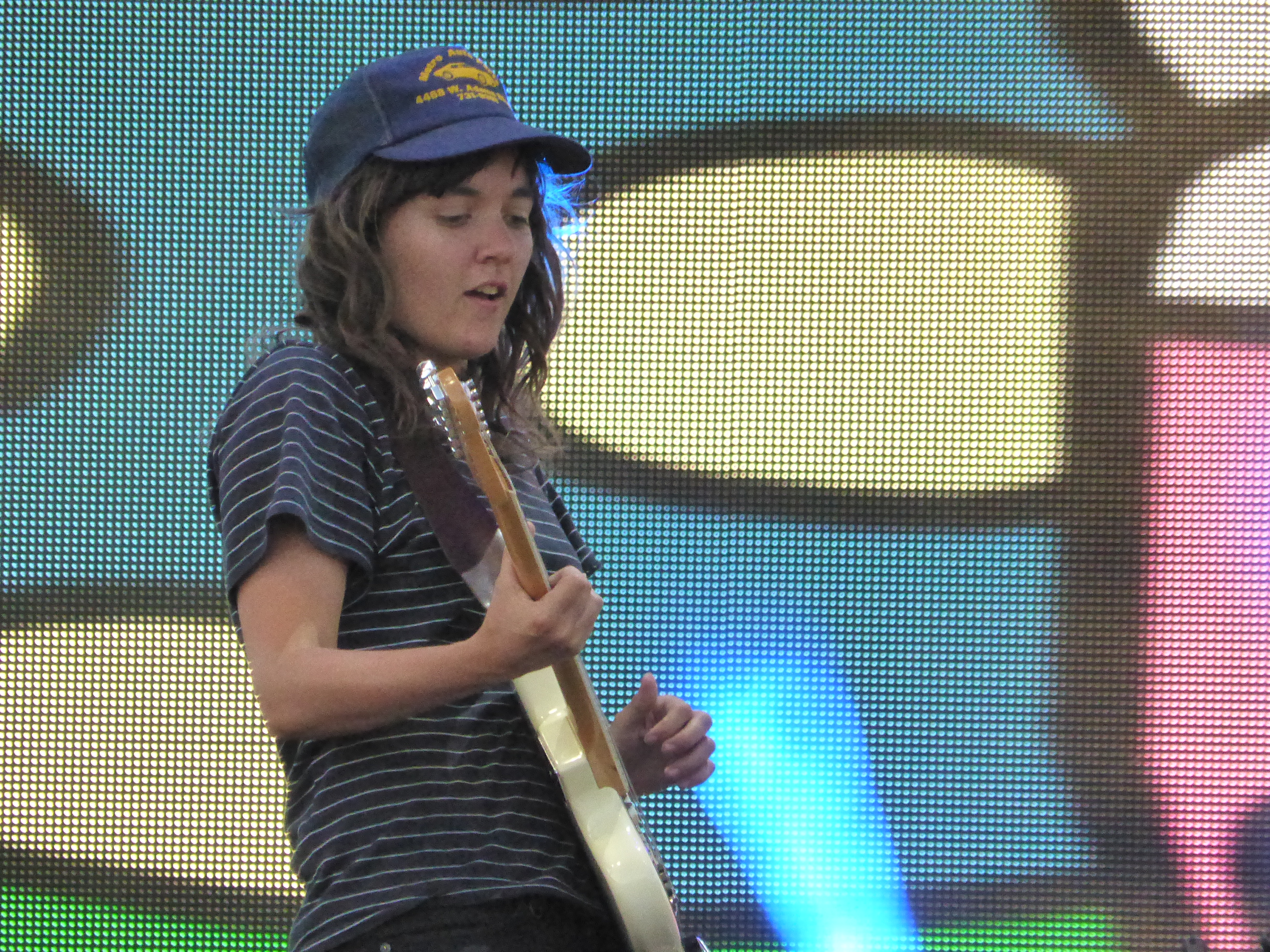
Barnett performing in April 2016

Sometimes I Sit and Think was met with critical acclaim, The Times, Pitchfork and the Chicago Tribune. Up until the release of Sometimes I Sit and Think, and Sometimes I Just Sit, Courtney Barnett, Bones Sloane, and Dave Mudie toured as Courtney Barnett and the Courtney Barnetts.

In August 2015, Barnett's UK label, Marathon Artists, in partnership with Mom + Pop Music and Milk! Records, launched a global guerilla campaign for the release of her single "Nobody Really Cares If You Don't Go to the Party". Billboards and posters bearing the song's title went up in London, New York, Los Angeles, Melbourne and Sydney. The campaign garnered a lot of interest online and across social media and culminated in a surprise busking gig in Camden, London.

In concert, Dan Luscombe (of The Drones) has often played lead guitar and keyboards, having featured on both, How to Carve a Carrot Into a Rose and Sometimes I Sit and Think, and Sometimes I Just Sit, the latter of which he co-produced. When Luscombe was not available, the band performed as a trio, with Barnett playing guitar. Luscombe did not play on Barnett's 2015 tours, however, and she now refers to the band as the "CB3" on her Facebook page. The CB3 moniker features prominently on drummer Dave Mudie's bass drum.

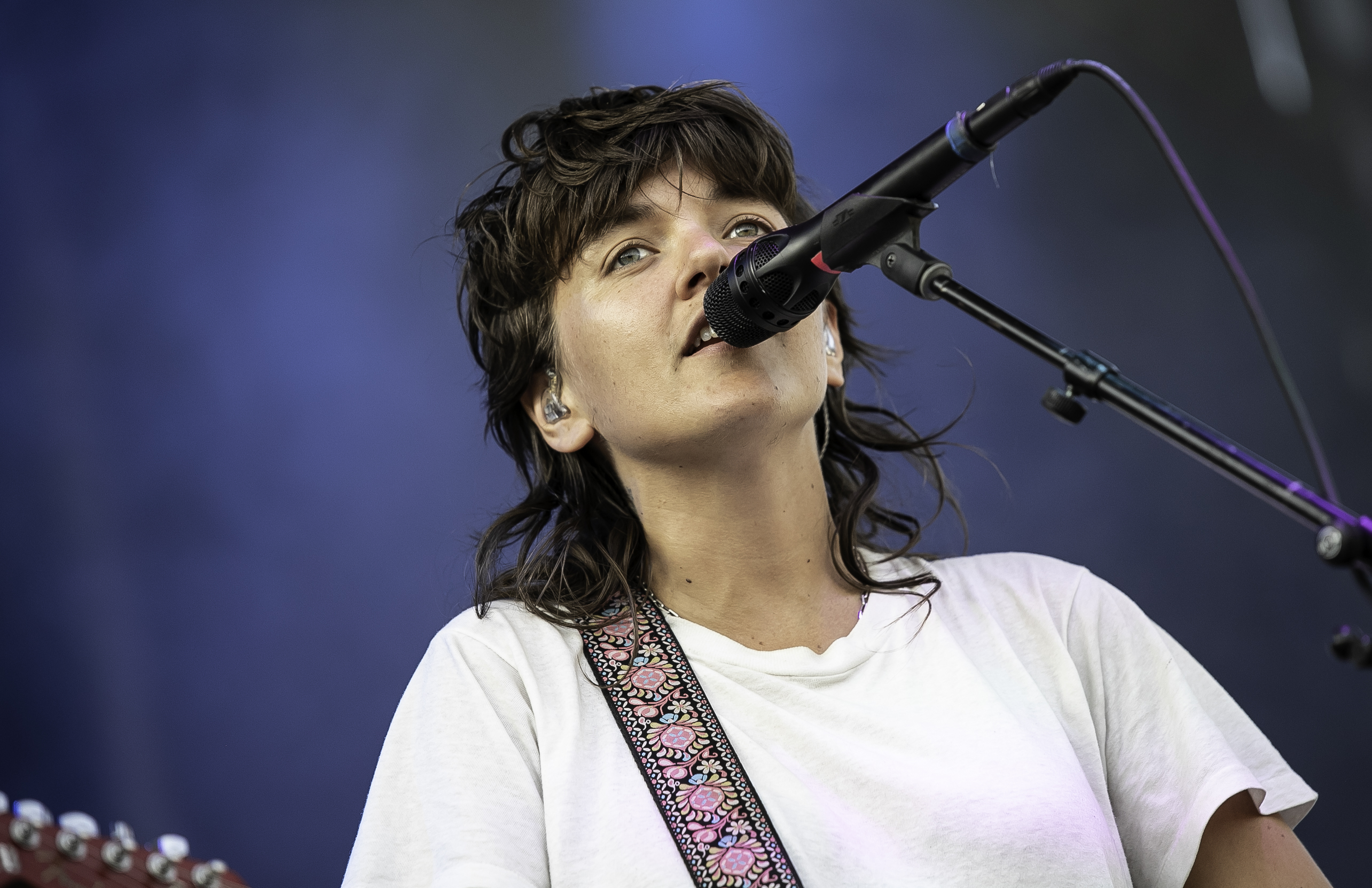
Barnett performing in June 2019

Barnett was nominated in eight categories at the ARIA Music Awards of 2015 and won four trophies: Breakthrough Artist, Best Female Artist, Best Independent Release and Best Cover Art for Sometimes I Sit and Think, and Sometimes I Just Sit. At the end of 2015, Barnett was nominated for a Grammy Award in the Best New Artist category. She was later nominated for Best International Female in 2016 for the Brit Awards. On 21 May 2016, she was the musical guest on the season finale of Saturday Night Live's 41st season, hosted by Fred Armisen. In January 2016, Barnett appeared on the cover of Australian music magazine, Happy Mag. On 27 May 2016, she was the musical guest on The Tonight Show Starring Jimmy Fallon.

In 2017, Barnett and Kurt Vile recorded the collaborative album Lotta Sea Lice, released via Matador Records, Marathon Artists and Milk! Records on October 13. Some of the album collaborators include Stella Mozgawa, Mick Harvey and the Dirty Three's Mick Turner and Jim White. The lead single "Over Everything" was released on August 30, 2017, accompanied by the music video directed by Danny Cohen. "Over Everything" initially sparked the pair's collaboration, after Philadelphia-based Vile wrote the song with the Melbourne-based Barnett's voice in mind. The second single "Continental Breakfast" was released on 26 September 2017. In June 2017 Vile and Barnett announced a North American tour. The duo was backed by the Sea Lice, a band featuring Janet Weiss (Sleater-Kinney, Wild Flag), Rob Laakso (The Violators, Swirlies, Mice Parade), Stella Mozgawa (Warpaint), and Katie Harkin (Sky Larkin, touring member of Sleater-Kinney and Wild Beasts).

On 12 February 2018, Barnett teased a new album on her social media accounts, featuring her trying out various musical instruments with the clip ending with the tagline "Tell Me How You Really Feel". Barnett released the singles "Nameless, Faceless", "Need A Little Time", "City Looks Pretty", and "Sunday Roast" from her sophomore solo album, which was launched at a private function at Sydney's Lansdowne Hotel in April 2018 and emceed by ex–The Go-Betweens Lindy Morrison. The album was eventually released on 18 May 2018 and titled Tell Me How You Really Feel. The album dealt, in part, with Barnett's thoughts about isolation in the social media age. "City Looks Pretty" was featured on the soundtrack of the video game FIFA 19.

In 2019, Barnett was added to the bill of Woodstock 50, but the festival was cancelled in May. On 7 July 2021, Barnett released "Rae Street", the lead single from her third studio album—Things Take Time, Take Time—which was released on 12 November 2021. On 3 July 2022, Barnett supported the Rolling Stones at their concert at Hyde Park in London, UK.

In July 2023, Barnett confirmed Milk! Records will be disestablished at the end of 2023, after 12 years. The final album released on the label was the instrumental End of the Day, released on 8 September 2023. The album features 17 tracks written to score the 2021 documentary, Anonymous Club.

In October of 2025, Barnett released her first new music video and vocal single in two years, "Stay in Your Lane" - which was later performed on The Tonight Show Starring Jimmy Fallon. In January 2026, Barnett released a new single, "Site Unseen" featuring Waxahatchee. Her fourth studio album, Creature of Habit, was released on 27 March 2026.

== In film ==
In December 2020, NME reported that a documentary titled Anonymous Club exploring "the inner life of the notoriously shy [Barnett] amidst her significant rise to fame" was in the works, after receiving $2.5 million in funding from Screen Australia. Anonymous Club was directed by Danny Cohen, who had collaborated with Barnett on several of her music videos previously, and was executive produced by Sue Maslin and her company Film Art Media. The film premiered at the Melbourne International Film Festival in August 2021, and screened at a number of film festivals before being released in cinemas. It was also broadcast on ABC Television, and is available on DVD.

== Equipment and playing style ==
Barnett performing in 2026

Barnett plays left-handed, using mostly left-handed guitars with standard tuning and string order for left-handed players (low strings at the top, high strings at the bottom). She occasionally plays right-handed guitars flipped upside down, but does not prefer it. She learned to play on acoustic guitars, and developed her own method of fingerstyle guitar because she disliked the sound of a pick; she later transferred this playing style to the electric guitar. While she preferred to play electric guitar without a pick for some years, as of 2025 she has started using one. She prefers to play in standard tuning, but has used open G tuning for slide guitar.

Among the guitars Barnett has used for performance and recording are a Harmony H59 and a number of Fenders, including Jaguars, Stratocasters, and Telecasters, which she strings with Ernie Ball Power Slinky strings in the 0.011–0.048 gauge. She plays through Fender Hot Rod Deville and Fender Deluxe amplifiers, with effects pedals including a Fulltone OCD overdrive pedal, a "cheap delay pedal", and a chorus pedal.

== Personal life ==
Barnett was in a relationship with fellow musician Jen Cloher from 2012 to 2018, and the song "Numbers" was co-written by the pair about their relationship. Barnett's song "Pickles from the Jar" also details their relationship, and Cloher is mentioned in the first line of "Dead Fox". Barnett called Cloher a "huge constant influence" on her music. She also played guitar in Cloher's band from 2012 to 2018.

== Backing band members ==
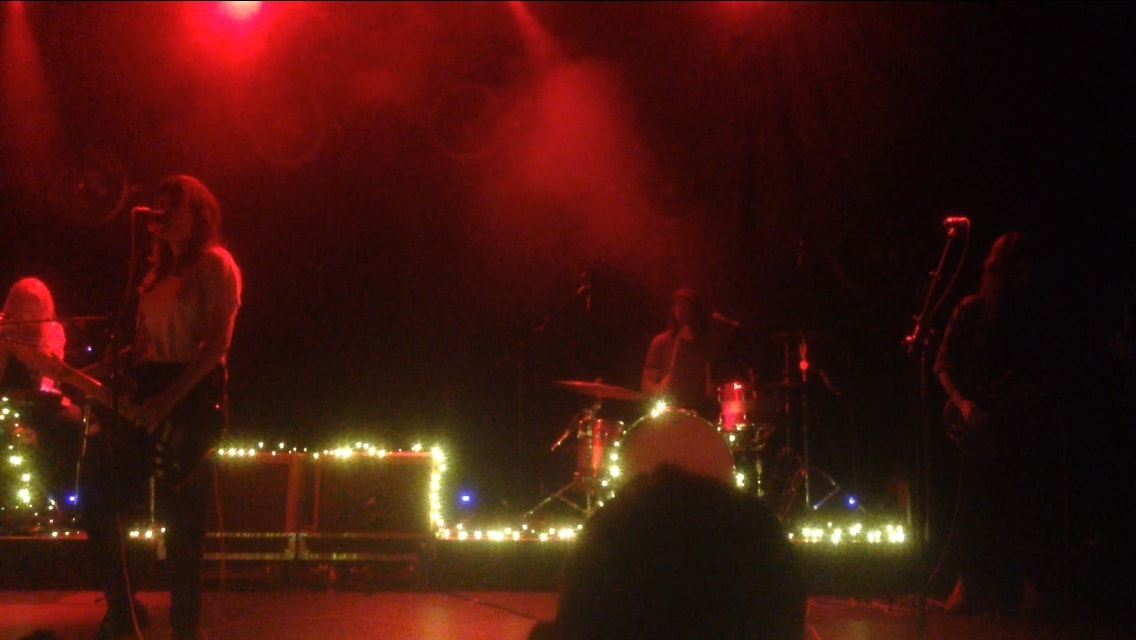
Barnett performing with her band in August 2018; from left to right: Katie Harkin, Barnett, Dave Mudie, and Bones Sloane

Current

- Andrew "Bones" Sloane – bass, backing vocals (2013–present)
- Stella Mozgawa – drums, percussion (2024–present), backing vocals, sampler (2021–present), keyboards (2021–2024)

Former

- Oliver Mestitz – drums, backing vocals (2010–2012)
- Alex Hamilton – guitar, backing vocals (2012–2013)
- Pete Convery – bass (2012–2013)
- Dan Luscombe – guitar, keyboards, backing vocals (2013–2014; session/touring musician 2017)
- Dave Mudie – drums, percussion, backing vocals (2013–2024)

Session/touring

- Katie Harkin – guitar, keyboards, backing vocals (2018)
- Lucy Waldron – cello, backing vocals (2019)
- Evelyn Ida Morris – piano, backing vocals (2019)
- Zach Dawes – bass (2025)

== Discography ==
- Sometimes I Sit and Think, and Sometimes I Just Sit (2015)
- Lotta Sea Lice (2017, with Kurt Vile)
- Tell Me How You Really Feel (2018)
- Things Take Time, Take Time (2021)
- Creature of Habit (2026)

== See also ==
- List of musicians who play left-handed
