= Milk! Records =

- Founded: 2012
- Founder: Courtney Barnett; Jen Cloher
- Defunct: 2023
- Location: Melbourne, Australia
- Official website: milk.milkrecords.com.au

Milk! Records was an Australian record label founded by musicians Courtney Barnett and Jen Cloher in Melbourne in 2012, with Barnett serving as creative director and Cloher as label manager. In 2019, former Trifekta Records manager Tom Larnach-Jones took over from Cloher.

In 2023, Barnett announced that the label would shut down at the end of the year due to "persistent financial concerns" that had been exacerbated by Australia's COVID-19 restrictions. Her instrumental album End of the Day was the label's final release.

== Artists ==
- Courtney Barnett
- Chastity Belt (Australian distribution)
- East Brunswick All Girls Choir
- Dyson Stringer Cloher
- Jen Cloher
- Ouch My Face
- The Finks
- Fraser A. Gorman
- Hand Habits
- Hachiku
- Jade Imagine
- Evelyn Ida Morris
- Tiny Ruins
- Sleater-Kinney (Australian distribution)
- Loose Tooth

== Awards and nominations ==
=== AIR Awards ===
The Australian Independent Record Awards (commonly known informally as AIR Awards) is an annual awards night to recognise, promote, and celebrate the success of Australia's Independent Music sector.

Year	Nominee / work	Award	Result
2015	Milk! Records	Best Independent Label	Won
2018	Milk! Records	Best Independent Label	Won
2022	Milk! Records	Independent Label of the Year	Nominated

=== National Live Music Awards ===
The National Live Music Awards (NLMAs) commenced in 2016 to recognise contributions to the live music industry in Australia.

Year	Nominee / work	Award	Result
2018	Milk! Records	Industry Achievement	Nominated
