= Marathon Artists =

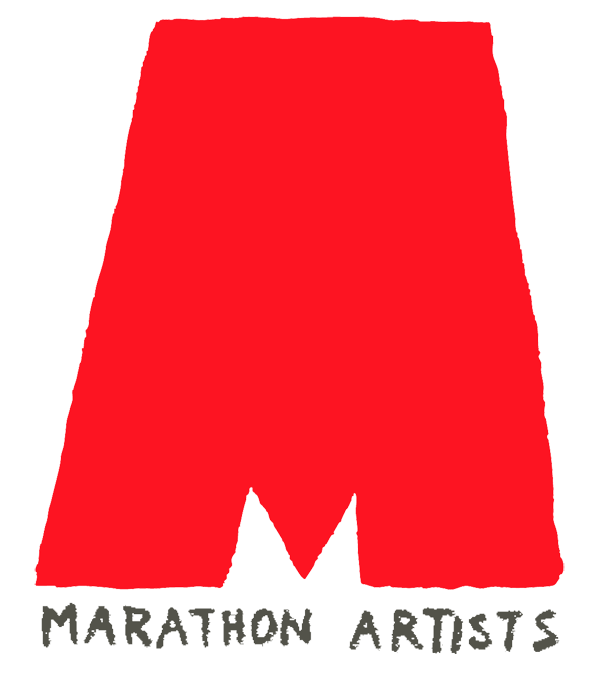
- Founded: 2012
- Founder: Paul-Rene Albertini, Jimmy Mikaoui, Philippe Ascoli
- Country of origin: United Kingdom
- Location: London, England
- Official website: Marathon Artists

Marathon Artists is a London-based independent record label founded by Paul-René Albertini, Philippe Ascoli and Jimmy Mikaoui in 2012. The label also runs its own publishing and management divisions. Artists on the label include Courtney Barnett, Pond, Hazel English, Childhood, Max Jury, Sonia Stein, Jamie Isaac, Tiny Ruins, Baaba Maal, Shock Machine, Afro B, Alaskalaska, Jen Cloher, and Bellah.

Marathon Artists is also home to imprint labels House Anxiety, MOVES and Mahogany Records.

House Anxiety launched in 2008, with releases from King Krule to Forth Wanderers, Childhood to The Big Pink. As of 2018, the label both developed future Marathon Artists signings, as well as maintained its own roster of artists.

MOVES launched in 2017, led by the A&R and journalist Ian McQuaid, who, along with Afro B, co-curated the first official UK Afrobeats compilation, MOVES: The Sound of UK Afrobeats. The label has worked with Naira Marley, Harlem Spartans, Mista Silva, Jaji Hollands and Omo Frenchie. MOVES has released music from Belly Squad, Afro B, Skengdo & AM and Finesse Foreva.

Mahogany Records launched in 2017 to release recordings from the Mahogany Sessions YouTube Channel, and has released works from James Bay and George Ezra.

In 2016, Marathon Artists LABs accelerating startup business development programme in music and technology launched in partnership with Sushi Venture Partners. Marathon Artists LABs targets product-ready applications that optimise the exposure of creators’ work and its monetisation.
