= The Grand Opening (album) =

Studio album by Planet Asia
- Released: January 27, 2004
- Studios: Def Con IV (Los Angeles, California); The Static Lounge (Los Angeles, California); Wolfpack Studios (Los Angeles, California); Quality Control Studios (San Francisco, California)
- Genre: Hip-hop
- Length: 56:58
- Label: Avatar
- Producers: Darren "Limitless" Henson; Evidence; Ivan Barias; Jake One; J. Thrill; J. Wells; KutMasta Kurt; Oh No; Supa Dave West; The Architect; Tracks; Vitamin D

Planet Asia chronology
Still in Training (2002)	The Grand Opening (2004)	The Steady Gang Mix Tape (2004)

Singles from The Grand Opening
- 1. "Pure Coke" Released: 2001; 2. "Summertime in the City" Released: August 12, 2003; 3. "It's All Big" Released: March 30, 2004; 4. "Real Niggaz" Released: 2004

Professional ratings
Review scores
Source	Rating
AllHipHop	3.5/5 stars
HipHopDX	3/5
Prefix	6/10
RapReviews	8.5/10

The Grand Opening is the second full-length solo studio album by American rapper Planet Asia. It was released on January 27, 2004, via Avatar Records. Recording sessions took place at Def Con IV Studios, The Static Lounge and Wolfpack Studios in Los Angeles and at Quality Control Studios in San Francisco. Production was handled by the Architect, Darren "Limitless" Henson, Evidence, Ivan Barias, Jake One, J. Thrill, J. Wells, KutMasta Kurt, Oh No, Supa Dave West, Tracks and Vitamin D. It features guest appearances from Big Wig, Cecilie Davis, Crunch, Ghostface Killah, Goapele, Martin Luther McCoy, Shake Da Mayor, and his Cali Agents cohort Rasco. The album debuted at number 46 on the Billboard Independent Albums chart in the United States.

== Background ==
The release of 2000's How The West Was One landed Planet Asia a deal with Interscope Records. He released a single "Pure Coke" in 2001 under the label. However, while signed to Interscope, he was not promoted much and stayed with the label until 2003 without releasing an album. The result was the rapper moving to Avatar Records and recording new material, including the single "Summertime in the City", which was released on August 12, 2003. The songs "It's All Big" and "Real Niggaz" were issued as the third and the fourth singles, respectively, from The Grand Opening.

== Track listing ==
No.	Title	Writer(s)	Producer(s)	Length
1.	"Intro"			0:15
2.	"16 Bars of Death"	Jason Green; Roger Roberts		3:28
3.	"Right or Wrong"	Green; Michael Perretta	Evidence	4:12
4.	"Real Niggaz" (featuring Ghostface Killah)	Green; Dennis Coles; David West	Supa Dave West	5:04
5.	"It's All Big"	Green; Jon Wells; Michael Thaddeus McDonald	J. Wells	3:42
6.	"Pure Coke" (featuring Martin Luther McCoy)	Green; Martin Luther McCoy; Darren T. Henson; Ivan Barias	Darren "Limitless" Henson; Ivan "Orthodox" Barias	4:15
7.	"Hypnotized" (featuring Cecilie Davis and Crunch)	Green; Cecilie Davis; Crunch Davis; Michael Jackson	Oh No	4:50
8.	"Paper Up (Hustler's Theme)"	Green; Kurt Matlin	KutMasta Kurt	3:27
9.	"The Greatest" (performed by Cali Agents)	Green; Keida Brewer; Gary Herd	Architect	4:14
10.	"Freestyle Interlude"			1:07
11.	"Upside Down" (featuring Goapele)	Green; Goapele Mohlabane; Derrick Brown	Vitamin D	5:08
12.	"Light Green" (featuring Shake Da Mayor)	Green; Chuma Solwazi; Omar Barclay	Tracks	4:31
13.	"Summertime in the City"	Green; Brian Armstead	J. Thrill	3:59
14.	"Swallow Dem Whole"	Green; Herd	Architect	4:15
15.	"As Long as I'm Alive"	Green; Jacob Dutton	Jake One; Walt Liquor (co.)	4:31
Total length:				56:58

== Personnel ==
- Steve Pageot – flute & additional keyboards (track 5)
- Levy "Bloe" St. Mary – keyboards (track 15)
- Todd "Mum's The Word" Mumford – recording (tracks: 2, 7, 12, 13)
- Michael "Evidence" Perretta – recording (track 2)
- Jon "J. Wells" Henderson – recording & mixing (track 3)
- Walter "Walt Liquor" Taylor – recording (tracks: 4, 6, 11, 15), mixing (tracks: 7, 11, 12, 15), engineering assistant (tracks: 7, 12), executive producer
- "KutMasta Kurt" Matlin – recording & mixing (track 8)
- Gary "The Architect" Herd – recording & mixing (tracks: 9, 14)
- Justin "Dubb" Taylor – mixing (tracks: 2, 13), engineering assistant (track 7)
- Richard "Segal" Huredia – mixing (tracks: 3, 4, 7, 12, 15)
- Victor Mancusi – mixing (track 5)
- Joe Warlick – mixing (track 6)
- Jeff King – mastering
- Russell Redeaux – executive producer, A&R
- Jason "Planet Asia" Green – executive producer
- Keith Corcoran – graphic design
- DJ Raphiki – A&R

== Charts ==
Chart (2004)	Peak position
US Independent Albums (Billboard)	46
