= Big Shot =

Big Shot may refer to:

== Characters ==
- Big Shot, an animated superhero character on the television show The Tick created by cartoonist Ben Edlund in 1986
- Big Shot, the former mascot of the Philadelphia 76ers until 1996
- Big Shot, an antagonist in the Marvel UK comic Death's Head

== Film and television ==
- The Big Shot (1922 film), a German silent film
- The Big Shot (1931 film), a pre-Code comedy directed by Ralph Murphy, starring Eddie Quillan and Maureen O'Sullivan
- The Big Shot (1937 film), a comedy directed by Edward Killy, starring Guy Kibbee and Cora Witherspoon
- The Big Shot (1942 film), an American film noir crime drama directed by Lewis Seiler, starring Humphrey Bogart and Irene Manning
- Big Shots (film), a 1987 American comedy adventure film directed by Robert Mandel, starring Ricky Busker and Darius McCrary
- Big Shot: Confessions of a Campus Bookie, a 2002 television film starring David Krumholtz
- Big Shot (TV series), an American television series developed by Dean Lorey and David E. Kelley
- Big Shots (TV series), a 2007–2008 American television drama series
- Big Shot, a fictional TV show in the 1998 anime Cowboy Bebop
- "Big Shots" (CSI: Crime Scene Investigation), an episode of CSI: Crime Scene Investigation
- "Big Shot" (Runaways), an episode of Runaways

== Literature ==
- Big Shot Comics, a 1940s comic book series, an anthology title published by Columbia Comics
- Diary of a Wimpy Kid: Big Shot, a 2021 children's novel by Jeff Kinney

== Music ==
- "Big Shot", a song by the Bonzo Dog Doo-Dah Band from their 1967 album Gorilla
- "Big Shot" (song), a song by Billy Joel, from his 1978 album 52nd Street
- "Big Shot", a song by The Beat (The English Beat) from their 1980 album I Just Can't Stop It
- "Big Shot", a song by Bark Psychosis from their 1994 album Hex
- "Big Shot", a 2003 song by Kill Hannah
- Big Shots (album), a 2003 album by Charizma & Peanut Butter Wolf
- Big Shots Bonus EP, the 2004 follow-up by Charizma & Peanut Butter Wolf
- "Big Shot", a song by Drake Bell from his 2011 EP A Reminder
- "Big Shot", a song by Islander, the theme song of the Bound for Glory wrestling event
- "Big Shot", a song by Kendrick Lamar and Travis Scott from the Black Panther soundtrack
- "Big Shot", a song by the Lumineers for their album Brightside
- "BIG SHOT", a 2021 track by Toby Fox from Deltarune, Chapter 2

== Photography ==
- Big Shot, a Polaroid instant camera manufactured from 1971 to 1973
- Bigshot (digital camera), a 2013 build-it-yourself digital camera designed for ages 8 to 14

== Other ==
- Big Shot (ride), an amusement ride, opened 1996, on top of the Stratosphere Las Vegas tower
- Big Shot (pinball), a pinball machine created in 1973 by Gottlieb
- Big Shot, a New Orleans–based soda brand by National Beverage subsidiary Winnsboro Beverage Packers
- Big Shot, a 2013 episode of ESPN 30 for 30 documentary about the purchase and ownership of the National Hockey League's New York Islanders by John Spano
- Mr. Big Shot, nickname for American basketball player Chauncey Billups
- Frank Fisher (rugby league) (1905–1980), Australian player nicknamed "Big Shot"
