= Escape from Alcatraz (album) =

Escape From Alcatraz

Studio album by Rasco
- Released: September 9, 2003
- Studio: Hyde St. Studios (San Francisco, CA)
- Genre: Hip hop
- Length: 53:52
- Label: Coup d'État
- Producer: Ammbush; Brisk One; Champ; Da Beatminerz; Jake One; Kleph Dollaz; Omen; Richness; Samson S

Rasco chronology
Hostile Environment (2001)	Escape From Alcatraz (2003)	The Dick Swanson Theory (2005)

Professional ratings
Review scores
Source	Rating
HipHopDX	6/10
RapReviews	7/10

Escape from Alcatraz is the third full-length solo studio album by American rapper Rasco. It was released on September 9, 2003, via Coup d'État. Production was handled by Brisk One, Jake One, Kleph Dollaz, Ammbush, Champ, Da Beatminerz, Omen, Richness and Samson S. It features guest appearances from Casual, Chali 2na, Kisha Griffin, Reks, Shake Da Mayor, and his Cali Agents partner Planet Asia.

== Track listing ==
No.	Title	Producer(s)	Length
1.	"Intro"	Brisk One	1:03
2.	"Get Free" (featuring Shake Da Mayor)	Brisk One	3:56
3.	"U Got the Time"	Kleph Dollaz	4:01
4.	"The Sweet Science" (featuring Chali 2na)	Jake One	4:03
5.	"Put Your Hands Up"	Jake One	3:53
6.	"Interlude"	Richness	0:29
7.	"My Life"	Champ	4:14
8.	"Making U Move" (featuring Reks)	Kleph Dollaz	3:42
9.	"We Get Live"	Jake One	3:48
10.	"San Fran to the Town" (featuring Casual)	Jake One; Samson S	4:01
11.	"Let's Get Down Tonight"	Brisk One	3:34
12.	"Interlude"		1:02
13.	"Snakes in the Grass (The Jon Sexton Story)"	Omen	4:32
14.	"Endless" (performed by Cali Agents)	Brisk One	4:23
15.	"Real Hot"	Da Beatminerz	3:27
16.	"All I Wanna Be" (featuring Kisha Griffin)	Ammbush	3:44
Total length:			53:52
