= APIII =

APIII| can mean:

- Andrew Pendelton III, an American professional wrestler
- American Patriots Three Percent, an American right-wing militia
