= AP3 =

AP3 or AP-3 may refer to:

- The ABC Model of Flower Development
- American Patriots Three Percent, a far-right militia group in the United States
- Andrew Pendelton III, an American professional wrestler (born 1982)
- USS Hancock (AP-3), a transport ship acquired by the United States Navy in 1902 which saw service during World War I.
- AP-3C Orion, a variant of the P-3C Orion maritime patrol aircraft used by the Royal Australian Air Force
