= The Medicine (Planet Asia album) =

Studio album by Planet Asia
- Released: September 19, 2006
- Studio: Sound Proof (Venice, CA); The Lab (New York, NY)
- Genre: Hip-hop
- Length: 1:03:40
- Label: ABB Records; Battle Axe Records
- Producer: Evidence; Nucleus; Alchemist; Bravo

Planet Asia chronology
The Sickness, Part One (2006)	The Medicine (2006)	Jewelry Box Sessions: The Album (2007)

Professional ratings
Review scores
Source	Rating
HipHopDX	2.5/5
Okayplayer	3/5 stars
RapReviews	8/10

The Medicine is a solo studio album by American rapper Planet Asia. It was released on September 19, 2006, through ABB Records and Battle Axe Records. Recording sessions took place at Soundproof in Venice, Los Angeles and at The Lab in New York City. All songs were produced by Evidence, with assistance from Alchemist, Nucleus and Bravo. It features guest appearances from Auch Dixon, Black Thought, Cali Agents, Defari, Dilated Peoples, Jonell, Killa Ben, Krondon, Kubiq, Phil Da Agony, Prodigy, Shake Da Mayor, Supa Supreme and Turbin.

The album serves as the third installment of Planet Asia's "Medicali series", following The Sickness and The Diagnosis. The album's lead single is "Thick Ropes" b/w "On Your Way 93706".

== Track listing ==
No.	Title	Writer(s)	Producer(s)	Length
1.	"Da Prescription"	Jason C. Green; Michael Taylor Perretta	Evidence	2:36
2.	"Thick Ropes"	Green; Perretta	Evidence; Nucleus	3:51
3.	"Get Active" (featuring Krondon and Phil Da Agony)	Green; Marvin Jones; Jason Lawrence Smith; Perretta	Evidence	4:44
4.	"All the Names"	Green; Perretta	Evidence	4:37
5.	"Over Your Head" (featuring Black Thought)	Green; Tarik Trotter; Perretta; Alan Maman	Evidence; Alchemist	3:56
6.	"In Love with You" (featuring Jonell)	Green; Shannon J. Showes; Perretta	Evidence	5:06
7.	"That's on Me"	Green; Perretta	Evidence	4:47
8.	"On Your Way 93706"	Green; Perretta	Evidence	3:53
9.	"Get Down or Lay Down" (featuring Kubiq and Supa Supreme)	Green; Cinque D. Webb; Perretta	Evidence	3:30
10.	"The Medicine"	Green; Perretta	Evidence	3:09
11.	"Stick & Move" (featuring Prodigy)	Green; Albert J. Johnson; Keith E. Thomas; Perretta	Evidence	3:55
12.	"Ghetto's Thirsty" (featuring Auch Dixon)	Green; Achaia E. Dixon; Alfie Easkin Dixon; Perretta	Evidence	5:17
13.	"The Hustle Pt II" (featuring Shake Da Mayor)	Green; Chuma Solwazi; Perretta	Evidence	2:40
14.	"No Questions Asked" (featuring Killa Ben and Turbin)	Green; Thomas; Ronnie Sean Real; Perretta	Evidence; Bravo (co.)	4:14
15.	"Old Timer Thoughts" (featuring Defari)	Green; Duane A. Johnson; Perretta	Evidence	3:52
16.	"Dilated Agents" (featuring Rasco, Rakaa and Evidence)	Green; Keida Bewer; Rakaa Taylor; Perretta	Evidence	3:33
Total length:				1:03:40

== Personnel ==
- Jeffrey Babko – keyboards
- Chris "DJ Babu" Oroc – scratches
- Kurt "DJ Revolution" Hoffman – scratches
- Michael "Evidence" Peretta – producer, recording, executive producer
- Alan "The Alchemist" Maman – producer, recording
- West "Nucleus" Plischke – producer
- Tavish "Bravo" Graham – co-producer
- Richard "Segal" Huredia – mixing
- Bernie Grundman – mastering
- Shane "Madchild" Bunting – executive producer
- Walter "Walt Liquor" Taylor – executive producer
- Jason "Planet Asia" Green – executive producer
- Ben "Beni B" Nickleberry Jr. – associate producer
