= My Vinyl Weighs a Ton =

Studio album by Peanut Butter Wolf
- Released: January 18, 1999
- Genre: Hip hop
- Length: 67:02
- Label: Stones Throw Records, Copasetik Records
- Producer: Peanut Butter Wolf, DJ Design

Peanut Butter Wolf chronology
Lunar Props (1995)	My Vinyl Weighs a Ton (1999)	My Vinyl Weighs a Ton Instrumentals (1999)

Singles from My Vinyl Weighs a Ton
- 1. "Run the Line" Released: 1997; 2. "Styles, Crews, Flows, Beats" Released: 1998; 3. "Definition of Ill" Released: 1999; 4. "Tale of Five Cities" Released: 1999

My Vinyl Weighs a Ton is the debut studio album by American hip hop producer and DJ Peanut Butter Wolf. It was released in 1999 on his own record label, Stones Throw Records, in conjunction with Copasetik Records. It peaked at number 44 on the UK Independent Albums Chart. On the week of March 1, 1999, it reached number 1 on the KTUH Top 30 chart.

== Critical reception ==
Professional ratings
Review scores
Source	Rating
AllMusic	4.5/5 stars
Robert Christgau	(neither)
CMJ New Music Monthly	favorable
NME	3/5 stars

John Bush of AllMusic called the album "one of the grooviest, funkiest underground records of the '90s." He said, "My Vinyl Weighs a Ton boasts deep beats and choice samples, all of them working brilliantly together, and enough great cutting to keep each track raw and full of energy." On the issue of March 1, 1999, CMJ New Music Report listed it as one of the "Essential Releases of the Week".

In 2015, Fact placed it at number 58 on the "Best Indie Hip-Hop Records of All Time" list. In 2016, HotNewHipHop placed it at number 5 on the "Top 10 Compilation-Style Albums by Producers" list.

== Track listing ==
No.	Title	Writer(s)	Length
1.	"Sit Down Shut Up"		0:15
2.	"In Your Area"	C. Manak, J. Green	2:25
3.	"Styles, Crew, Flows, Beats"	C. Manak, J. Brown, O. Jackson, R. Jimenez	5:50
4.	"Casio"	C. Manak, C. Oroc	3:50
5.	"Barter"		0:21
6.	"Hold Up"	C. Manak, K. Brewer	3:45
7.	"The Everliving"	C. Manak, D. Herd	0:42
8.	"Rock Unorthodox"	C. Manak, Pablo	2:58
9.	"Top Illin"		0:22
10.	"Necromancin"	C. Manak, D. Whalen	2:05
11.	"Keep On Rockin It"	C. Manak, C. Hicks	4:31
12.	"T Shirts"		0:29
13.	"Breaks 'Em Down"	C. Manak, Kazi	3:59
14.	"Tale of Five Cities"	C. Manak	8:50
15.	"Mr. Dibbs"		0:22
16.	"Definition of Ill"	C. Manak, J. Green	3:20
17.	"Theme from a Peanut Butter Wolf"		0:59
18.	"Run the Line"	C. Manak, K. Brewer	5:18
19.	"Phonies"	C. Manak, K. Griego	3:15
20.	"Ten Minutes Left"	C. Manak, J. Carlson	3:15
21.	"Mobbin"	C. Manak, J. Medina	3:09
22.	"Competition Gets None"	C. Manak, E. Acknowledge	4:14
23.	"Interruptions"	C. Manak	3:30
24.	"Hawaii 5000"		0:18

== Personnel ==
Credits adapted from liner notes.

- Peanut Butter Wolf – production, turntables
- Planet Asia – vocals (2, 16)
- Lootpack – vocals (3, 13), turntables (3, 13)
- DJ Babu – turntables (4)
- Rasco – vocals (6, 18)
- Zest – vocals (7, 23)
- Pablo – vocals (8)
- Dave Dub – vocals (10)
- Charizma – vocals (11)
- Kazi – vocals (13)
- A-Trak – turntables (14)
- Cut Chemist – turntables (14)
- DJ Hands – turntables (14)
- DJ Quest – turntables (14)
- DJ Total Eclipse – turntables (14)
- Z-Trip – turntables (14)
- J Rocc – turntables (14)
- Kid Koala – turntables (14)
- Rhettmatic – turntables (14)
- Rob Swift – turntables (14)
- Shortkut – turntables (14, 22)
- DJ Design – production (19), turntables (19)
- Capt. Funkaho – vocals (20)
- Persevere – vocals (21)
- Vin Roc – turntables (21)
- Grand the Vis – vocals (22)

== Charts ==
Chart	Peak position
UK Independent Albums (OCC)	44
