= Badmeaningood Vol.2 =

Compilation album by Roots Manuva
- Released: November 5, 2002
- Genre: Hip-hop; dub
- Label: Whoa Music / Ultimate Dilemma

Badmeaningood chronology
Badmeaningood Vol.1 (2002)	Badmeaningood Vol.2 (2002)	Badmeaningood Vol.3 (2003)

Professional ratings
Review scores
Source	Rating
Allmusic	link

Badmeaningood Vol.2 is a compilation of tracks chosen by alternative hip hop artist, Roots Manuva. The series was started by the author A. W. Wilde and released on Whoa Music / Ultimate Dilemma.

== Track listing ==
1. Roots Manuva - "Intro" – 2:06
2. Deckwrecka feat. MCD - "Priceless" – 3:29
3. Fallacy & Fusion - "The Groundbreaker" – 3:21
4. Willie Hutch - "(I'm Gonna) Hold On" – 3:34
5. The Beat - "Mirror in the Bathroom" – 2:59
6. Ce'Cile - "Sweetest Feeling" – 2:42
7. Bad Vibes & Potential Bad Boy - "Bad Boy" (DJ Mix) - 3:26
8. Sugar Minott - "Crazy Sound Boy" – 3:46
9. Ol' Dirty Bastard feat. Mack 10 & Royal Flush - "Caught Up" – 3:27
10. Braintax feat. Task Force - "Godnose" – 3:59
11. Eric B and Rakim - "Follow the Leader" – 3:32
12. N.W.A. - "Straight Outta Compton" – 2:44
13. Soul II Soul - "Keep on Movin'" – 3:09
14. Freeez - "I.O.U." – 3:42
15. Juicy - "Sugar Free" – 2:36
16. Lucy Pearl - "Can't Stand Your Mother" – 3:34
17. Outkast - "Elevators (Me & You)" – 3:56
18. Roots Manuva - "Yellow Submarine" – 2:55
19. Reachout - "Stimulation of Chaos (instrumental)" – 3:51

== See also ==
- Badmeaningood Vol.1 (2002, by Skitz)
- Badmeaningood Vol.3 (2003, by Peanut Butter Wolf)
- Badmeaningood Vol.4 (2003, by Scratch Perverts)
