= Badmeaningood Vol.3 =

Compilation album by Peanut Butter Wolf
- Released: February 25, 2003
- Genre: Hip-hop
- Label: Whoa Music / Ultimate Dilemma

Badmeaningood chronology
Badmeaningood Vol.2 (2002)	Badmeaningood Vol.3 (2003)	Badmeaningood Vol.4 (2003)

Professional ratings
Review scores
Source	Rating
Allmusic	link

Badmeaningood Vol.3 is a compilation of tracks chosen by alternative hip hop artist Peanut Butter Wolf. The series was started by the author A. W. Wilde and released on Whoa Music / Ultimate Dilemma.

== Track listing ==
1. Peanut Butter Wolf - "Intro" – 0:54
2. Grandmaster Flash - "New Adventures of Grandmaster Flash" – 0:55
3. Lord Alibaski - "Top Gun" – 1:40
4. Forty Five King & Louie - "Funk Box (We Want to Hear the Beat Box)" – 1:13
5. Iron Butterfly - "Soul Experience" – 1:38
6. Johnny Hammond - "Fantasy" – 4:17
7. Roy Ayers - "Can't You See Me" - 4:57
8. Alicia Myers - "Don't Stop What You're Doin'" – 2:14
9. Bernard Wright - "The Master Rocker" – 3:12
10. B Beat Girls - "Jungle Swing" – 4:24
11. The Human League - "Hard Times" – 5:20
12. Joe Jackson - "Steppin' Out" – 3:57
13. Cold Crush Brothers - "Punk Rock Rap" – 1:28
14. Michael White - "Let Love Be Your Magic Carpet" – 5:31
15. Prince Far I - "Black Man Land" – 2:01
16. Jungle Brothers - "I'm Gonna Do You" – 1:36
17. Charizma and Peanut Butter Wolf - "My World Premiere" – 1:51
18. Keni Burke - "Risin' to the Top" (Snowboys Acoustic Mix) – 4:24

== See also ==
- Badmeaningood Vol.1 (2002, by Skitz)
- Badmeaningood Vol.2 (2002, by Roots Manuva)
- Badmeaningood Vol.4 (2003, by Scratch Perverts)
