= The Birth (EP) =

EP by Rasco
- Released: 1999
- Studio: Darcman Studios (Oakland, CA); Jam Packed Studios (San Jose, CA)
- Genre: Underground hip hop
- Label: Copasetik Recordings
- Producer: Panik; Protest; Richness; Captain Kill A Mothafucka

Rasco chronology
Time Waits for No Man (1998)	The Birth (1999)	How the West Was One (2000)

Professional ratings
Review scores
Source	Rating
AllMusic	3/5 stars

The Birth is the first extended play by American rapper Rasco. Composed of eight tracks, it was released in 1999 via Copasetik Recordings. Recording sessions took place at Darcman Studios in Oakland and Jam Packed Studios in San Jose. Production was handled by Panik, Protest, Richness and Captain Kill A Mothafucka, with Jon Sexton and Rasco serving as executive producers. It features guest appearances from Planet Asia and Flii.

In 2004, it was reissued as The Birth LP through Pockets Linted Entertainment with three additional tracks between the seventh track and outro. Those songs were recorded at The Poolroom in San Francisco and produced by Philthy and Brisk One.

== Track listing ==
The Birth LP
No.	Title	Writer(s)	Producer(s)	Length
1.	"Intro"		Captain Kill A Mothafucka	0:47
2.	"Back on the Scene"	Keida Brewer	Panik	3:11
3.	"Dues and Dont's"	Brewer	Panik	4:11
4.	"Blood Brothaz" (performed by Cali Agents)	Brewer; Jason Green	Protest	4:08
5.	"Return of the MC"	Brewer	Panik	4:23
6.	"Sophisticated Mic Pro's"	Brewer	Panik	4:25
7.	"Final Destination" (performed by Cali Agents featuring Flii)	Brewer; Green; Anwar Burton	Richness	3:34
8.	"Authenticity"	Brewer	Philthy	3:36
9.	"What's That"	Brewer	Brisk One	4:22
10.	"Against Odds"	Brewer	Brisk One	3:50
11.	"Outro"		Captain Kill A Mothafucka	0:37
Total length:				37:04

Notes

- Tracks 8, 9 and 10 does not exist in the initial EP version.

== Personnel ==
- Kieda "Rasco" Brewer – vocals, executive producer
- Jason "Planet Asia" Green – vocals (tracks: 4, 7)
- Anwar "Flii" Burton – vocals (track 7)
- Captain Kill A Mothafucka – producer (tracks: 1, 11)
- Edward "Panik" Zamudio – producer (tracks: 2, 3, 5, 6)
- Roger "Protest" Roberts – producer (track 4)
- J. "Richness" Taylor – producer (track 7)
- Philthy – producer (track 8)
- Alfred "Brisk One" Martinez Jr. – producer (tracks: 9, 10)
- Ken Lee – mastering
- Jon Sexton – executive producer
- Mark Humphries – photography
