= Time Waits for No Man =

Studio album by Rasco
- Released: July 21, 1998
- Recorded: 1997–98
- Studio: Jam Packed Studios; Threshold Recordings (Santa Monica, CA)
- Genre: Underground hip hop
- Length: 1:02:03
- Label: Stones Throw Records
- Producer: Peanut Butter Wolf; DJ Design; Evidence; Fanatik; Joey Chavez; KutMasta Kurt; Paul Nice; Protest

Rasco chronology
| Time Waits for No Man (1998) | Hostile Environment (2001) |

Professional ratings
Review scores
| Source | Rating |
|---|---|
| AllMusic | 4/5 stars |
| Spin | 8/10 |

Time Waits for No Man is the debut solo studio album by American rapper Rasco. It was released on July 21, 1998, through Stones Throw Records. Recording sessions took place at Jam Packed Studios and at Threshold Recordings in Santa Monica, California. Production was handled by Peanut Butter Wolf, Paul Nice, Evidence, KutMasta Kurt, DJ Design, Fanatik, Joey Chavez and Protest. It features guest appearances from Defari, Dilated Peoples, DJ Vin Roc, Encore, and his Cali Agents partner Planet Asia.

== Track listing ==
| No. | Title | Producer(s) | Length |
|---|---|---|---|
| 1. | "Intro" | Protest | 1:01 |
| 2. | "Time Waits for No Man" (featuring Encore) | Paul Nice | 4:32 |
| 3. | "Suckas Don't Respect It" | Peanut Butter Wolf | 4:00 |
| 4. | "Bits & Pieces" | Evidence | 3:25 |
| 5. | "Major League" (featuring Defari and Dilated Peoples) | Evidence; Joey Chavez | 4:20 |
| 6. | "Interlude" | | 0:39 |
| 7. | "Me & My Crew" | KutMasta Kurt | 4:32 |
| 8. | "What It's All About" | DJ Design | 4:40 |
| 9. | "View to a Kill" | Paul Nice | 3:42 |
| 10. | "Unassisted DJ Battle" (featuring DJ Vin Roc) | Fanatik | 1:32 |
| 11. | "Unassisted" | Fanatik | 4:22 |
| 12. | "What Y'all Wanna Do" | Peanut Butter Wolf | 4:22 |
| 13. | "Hip Hop Essentials" | Peanut Butter Wolf | 4:13 |
| 14. | "Interlude" | | 0:29 |
| 15. | "Hey Love" | Peanut Butter Wolf | 5:09 |
| 16. | "Take It Back Home" (performed by Cali Agents) | KutMasta Kurt | 3:56 |
| 17. | "Heat Seeking" | Paul Nice | 4:48 |
| 18. | "Shout Outs (Outro)" | Peanut Butter Wolf | 2:21 |
| Total length: | | | 1:02:03 |

Sample credits

- Track 3 contains a sample of "The Chase, Part II" written by Ali Shaheed Muhammad, Jonathan Davis and Malik Taylor as performed by A Tribe Called Quest.
- Track 9 contains a sample from "Shook Ones, Part II" written by Albert Johnson and Tajuan Perry as performed by Mobb Deep.

== Personnel ==
- Kieda "Rasco" Brewer – vocals, executive producer
- Shaya "Encore" Bekele – vocals (track 2)
- Duane A. "Defari" Johnson Jr. – vocals (track 5)
- Michael "Evidence" Peretta – vocals (track 5), producer (tracks: 4, 5)
- Jason "Planet Asia" Green – vocals (track 16)
- Vincent "Vin Roc" Punsalan – featured artist (track 10)
- Kurt "DJ Revolution" Hoffman – scratches (track 4)
- Chris "DJ Babu" Oroc – scratches (track 5)
- Dave "D-Styles" Cuasito – scratches (track 11)
- Roger "Protest" Roberts – producer (track 1)
- Paul "Paul Nice" Kilianski – producer (tracks: 2, 9, 17)
- Chris "Peanut Butter Wolf" Manak – producer (tracks: 3, 12, 13, 15, 18), executive producer
- Joey Chavez – producer (track 5)
- Keith "DJ Design" Griego – producer (track 8)
- Rob "Fanatik" Bass – producer (track 11)
