= The Third Unheard: Connecticut Hip Hop 1979–1983 =

Compilation album by Various Artists
- Released: May 18, 2004
- Recorded: 1979–1982
- Genre: Hip hop, old school hip hop
- Label: Stones Throw
- Producer: Peanut Butter Wolf

Stones Throw Records chronology
Peanut Butter Wolf's Jukebox 45's (2002)	The Third Unheard: Connecticut Hip Hop 1979–1983 (2004)	World Psychedelic Classics, Vol. 3: Love's a Real Thing (2005)

Professional ratings
Review scores
Source	Rating
AllMusic	4/5 stars
Robert Christgau	A−
IGN	8/10
Prefix Magazine	9/10

The Third Unheard: Connecticut Hip Hop 1979–1983 is a compilation of old school hip hop music from Connecticut, a place not generally known for its rap music scene.

The album was released on compact disc and on vinyl by Stones Throw Records.

== Track listing ==
1. "Rappin' With Mr. Magic" (Mr. Magic) – 9:11
2. "Get Up (And Go to School)" (Pookey Blow) – 6:14
3. "Potential 1980" (Mister Magic) – 9:53
4. "Party People [Remix]" (Rappermatical Five) – 6:49
5. "Million Dollar Legs" (Outlaw Four) – 5:37
6. "2001 Kazoo's" (Mister Magic, Positive Choice Band) – 6:48
7. "Be-Bop Convention Theme" (Forum Band) – 2:30
8. "Shake Your Boody" (Chillie Three MCs) – 4:54
9. "Fill the Be-Bop" (LOD Crew) – 4:54
10. "Earth Break" (Mister Magic, Pookey Blow) – 5:33
11. "Ventriloquist Rap" (Willie & Woodie Brown) – 3:27
12. "I Just Wanna Dance" (Cuzz Band) – 3:23
13. "Showdown Rehearsal [Live]" (Second Showdown Crew) – 5:16
14. "Untitled Track" – 4:25

=== Musicians ===
- Percussion: Roy Alexander, Augustine "Apple" Cerrino,
- Guitar: Eugene Brown, Perry Mobley, Earl Whitaker
- Bass: Ed Cloud, Mark Moore, Doug Wimbish
- Drums: Steve Cloud, James "Louis" Moore, Pumpkin
- Turntables: DJ Starchild
- Horn: Fred Noble, Zadoc Noble

=== Album staff ===
- Research: Dooley-O, Egon
- Photography: Ali D, Butchie B, Cool Rap, Joey Dee, DJ Starchild, Stephen Free, Pookey Blow
- Art direction: Jeff Jank

=== Technical staff ===
- Executive producer: Peanut Butter Wolf
- Re-mastering: Dave Cooley
- Restoration: Dave Cooley
- Editing: Dave Cooley
- Engineering: Richard Robinson, DJ Starchild, Egon,
- Annotation: Egon
