= Head of state (disambiguation) =

Head of state is a term used in politics, law, and diplomacy.

Head of State may also refer to:

- Head of State (2003 film), an American comedy film
- Head of State (2016 film), an Armenian comedy film
- Heads of State (2025 film), an American action comedy film

== See also ==
- Head of the State (album), a 2004 album by Cali Agents
- Heads of State, a side project formed by members of the R&B group New Edition
