= Final Destination (disambiguation) =

Final Destination is an American horror franchise composed of films, comic books and novels.

Final Destination may also refer to:

== Film ==
- Final Destination, a 2000 film
- Final Destination 2, a 2003 film
- Final Destination 3, a 2006 film
- The Final Destination, also known as Final Destination 4, a 2009 film
- Final Destination 5, a 2011 film
- Final Destination Bloodlines, a 2025 film

== Music ==
=== Records ===
- Final Destination (album) by Coldrain, 2009
- Final Destination (XV Re:Recorded), the 2024 fifteenth anniversary re-recording album by Coldrain
- Final Destination (SpotemGottem album), a 2020 mixtape by SpotemGottem
- Final Destination, a 2003 mixtape by Juelz Santana

=== Songs ===
- "Final Destination", a 2009 song by Coldrain, the titular track off the albums Final Destination and XV Re:Recorded
- "Final Destination" (single), a 2004 single by Michael Learns to Rock off their eponymous album Michael Learns to Rock
- "Final Destination" (single), a 1990 single by the Cross off the album Mad, Bad and Dangerous to Know (The Cross album)
- "Final Destination", a 1999 song by Rasco from The Birth EP

== Other uses ==
- "Final Destination", a recurring stage in the Super Smash Bros. series
- "Final DeSmithation", a 2022 episode of the sixth season of Rick and Morty
- "Final Destination", a 2019 episode of the telenovela You Cannot Hide
- The Final Destination, a cheerleading competition in the United States
