= A Time for Everything =

A Time for Everything may refer to:

- A Time to Every Purpose Under Heaven, also known as A Time for Everything, a 2004 novel by Karl Ove Knausgård
- A Time for Everything, a 2009 album by Yaron Herman
- "A Time For Everything", a song from the 2001 compilation Magic Time
- "A Time For Everything", a single by Eldridge Holmes
