= Badmeaningood Vol.4 =

Compilation album by Scratch Perverts
- Released: 1 July 2003
- Genre: Hip-hop
- Label: Whoa Music / Ultimate Dilemma

Badmeaningood chronology
Badmeaningood Vol.3 (2003)	Badmeaningood Vol.4 (2003)

Professional ratings
Review scores
Source	Rating
Allmusic	link

Badmeaningood Vol.4 is a compilation of tracks chosen and mixed by British turntablists Scratch Perverts. The album was released by Whoa Music / Ultimate Dilemma, an independent record label which was part of the NewsCorp Music Group before it was absorbed into A&E Records in 2003. The series was started by the author A. W. Wilde.

== Track listing ==
1. Scratch Perverts - "Intro" – 1:33
2. Lalo Schifrin - "Scorpio's Theme" – 2:49
3. The Specials - "Ghost Town" – 5:20
4. 24-Carat Black - "Ghetto: Misfortune's Wealth" – 3:32
5. Kool G Rap & DJ Polo - "Streets of New York" – 3:43
6. London Posse - "Money Mad" – 3:12
7. Dr. Octagon - "Bear Witness" - 2:27
8. Mickey & the Soul Generation - "Iron Leg" – 2:09
9. DJ Shadow - "Entropy" – 3:34
10. Schoolly D - "Saturday Night" – 3:43
11. Show & A.G. - "Represent" – 3:39
12. Gang Starr - "Speak Ya Clout" – 3:46
13. M.O.P. - "Ante Up" – 3:22
14. Minnie Ripperton - "Les Fleurs" – 3:15
15. Sister Nancy - "Bam Bam" – 2:26
16. Super Cat - "Oh It's You" (Album version) – 1:28
17. Blackalicious - "Alphabet Aerobics" – 2:05
18. Squarepusher - "My Red Hot Car" – 3:07
19. Origin Unknown - "Valley of the Shadows" – 1:43
20. Scratch Perverts - "Beat Down" – 4:17

== See also ==
- Badmeaningood Vol.2 (2002, by Roots Manuva)
- Badmeaningood Vol.3 (2003, by Peanut Butter Wolf)
