= Paulie Rhyme =

American rapper

- Born: Paul Richardson
- Origin: Cleveland, Ohio, United States
- Genre: Hip hop
- Occupations: Emcee, Producer
- Instrument: vocalist
- Years active: 1995–present
- Labels: Browntown Wreckords, DTR45 Deep Thinka Records
- Website: Official Website

Paul Richardson, better known by his name Paulie Rhyme, is an American-born, Japan based musician from Cleveland, Ohio. He is the founder of Browntown Wreckords.

Paulie Rhyme is one half of the hip hop duo Public Radio, with producer deedot. He was also the lead vocalist of Finless Brown, Miles Outside, and Solganix. Previously, Paulie Rhyme was on Deep Thinka Records roster.

== Life and career ==
In the early 2000s, Paulie Rhyme was a promoter in Cleveland, putting on emcee battles and local showcases. In 2001, Paulie Rhyme would join the alternative Hip Hop band Finless Brown and gain regional acclaim, releasing the Browntown Ep in 2003. In 2004, Paulie Rhyme would move with Finless Brown to California and release their first LP, Next Caper, in 2005. In 2006, Paulie Rhyme released his first solo project, the PDA Ep, working with DJ Deetalks from Oddjobs, Felix of the Heiruspecs, and Dj Lord Jazz from Lords of the Underground. Paulie Rhyme would then gain national attention with his college charting project, Paulie Rhyme & Deedot present Public Radio, in 2007 with San Francisco producer deedot. The project featured appearances from Rasco (Cali Agents), Tableek (Maspyke), Nomi (Power Struggle/Kill the Vultures), and Moto (Finless Brown/Miles Outside). In 2009, their single, Squared Circle, would be nominated for the Just Plain Folks, Rap song of the year. Another song from the project, Block 4 Block featuring Rasco, would be featured on the massive multiplayer online game, APB: All Points Bulletin. This led him to tour through most of 2010 and 2011 with acts such as Grand Phee and Rhyson Hall (We Stole the Show), Hezekiah, Atherton, Loki da Trixta, Billy Drease Williams and Prince Po. Internationally, Paulie Rhyme has collaborated with producers Dj Sly, tofubeats, Nomak, Handycat, Soundtruck, and A June and A J Beat. Paulie has also collaborated on joint projects with fellow Cleveland artist Vic Freeze, San Jose's Rey Res and Ronnie Lee, as well as releasing internationally recognized mixtapes with Djs MICK, Terry Urban, Jack Da Rippa, and King Most. In 2015, Paulie Rhyme released the Super String Theory Ep produced entirely by Blueprint of Soul Position/Weightless Records.

== Discography ==
=== Studio albums ===
- Paulie Rhyme and Deedot present Public Radio (2007)

=== Compilation albums ===
- コラボ力学 Vol.2 (2010)
- Big Collab + Playboy (2011)
- ThatsThat Music Sampler (2011)

=== EPs ===
- The PDA Ep (2006)
- The Jose Mateo Ep (2010)
- Talented Tenth Ep (2011)
- Super String Theory Ep (2015)

=== Singles ===
- Dusk till Dawn (2008)
- Where Do We Go/Dirt McGirt (2009)
- T.R.A.N.S. (2012)
- Exercise/Greg Bandy (2013)
- Super String Theory (2015)

=== Guest appearances ===
- Big Daddy Sound - G.U.S. (2002)
- Gwizski - Feed the Soul (2007)
- Atherton - Harvest Your Hatred (2008)
- SpeakFree - Service Announcement (2008)
- Wreckelekt - Dream Catchin' (2008)
- Handycat - Had Enough (2009)
- Dj Sly - Like You (2009)
- Lukeino (Bachelor of Science) - The Key (2010)
- Rey Resurreccion - Every Moment (2010)
- Dubsworth - The Key Remix (2010)
- Atlantic Connection - The Key Remix (2011)
- KLH Music - Getting It (2011)
- Vic Freeze - Paletero Man (2011)
- Kazahaya - Stay (2012)
- Vic Freeze - 1 Ova Jordan (2014)
- Nomak - Make a Change (2014)
- A June & J Beat - Be Me Be You (2016)
- Crazy T - Dukes Up (2017)

== Mixtapes ==
- Industrial Arts
- Less Than Zero
- Less Than Zero Vol. 2
