= Mr Thing =

British hip hop producer

Mr Thing is a British hip hop producer. He is a former member of the Scratch Perverts. He has worked with such artists as Yungun, Doc Brown and Devise. Mr Thing was also the winner of the 2000 DMC UK DJ Championships, and the holder of the 1999 DMC World Team Championships as part of The Scratch Perverts.

== Discography ==
=== Mix CDs ===
- B Boys Revenge - History In The Makin - X:treme Records (1998)
- Badmeaningood Vol. 4: Scratch Perverts - Ultimate Dilemma (2003)
- Fabric Live 22 - Fabric (2005)
- Fabric Big Issue CD (free with the Big Issue September 24, 2005)
- The Kings Of Hip Hop CD 2 - Double Disc with DJ Premier on BBE Records (2005)
- Champion Nerd (Free Download) (2010)

=== Singles ===
- Come Get It with Time Scratch Perverts Records (25 October 2004)

=== Albums ===
- Yungun & Mr Thing - Grown Man Business (2006)

=== Compilations ===
- Pistache Presents Beats'n'Rhymes Vol.1 mixed by DJ IQ
