= Hostile Environment =

Studio album by Rasco
- Released: August 14, 2001
- Genre: Underground hip hop
- Label: Copasetik Recordings
- Producer: D.L. Jones; J. Rawls; Memo; Mr. Khaliyl; Panik; Protest; Rasco; Roddy Rod; Shake Diggy

Rasco chronology
Time Waits for No Man (1998)	Hostile Environment (2001)	Escape from Alcatraz (2003)

Professional ratings
Review scores
Source	Rating
AllMusic	4.5/5 stars
NME	4/5 stars
The Source	3/5 stars
Spin	6/10
XXL	XL (4/5)

Hostile Environment is the second full-length solo studio album by American rapper Rasco. It was released on August 14, 2001 via Copasetik Recordings. Production was handled by Memo, Protest, Roddy Rod, Mr. Khaliyl, Panik, D.L. Jones, J. Rawls, Shake Diggy, and Rasco himself. It features guest appearances from 427, Ed O.G., El Da Sensei, Protest, Reks, and his Cali Agents partner Planet Asia.

== Track listing ==
No.	Title	Producer(s)	Length
1.	"Intro"	Memo
2.	"Hostile Environment"	Protest
3.	"Lay Low"	Roddy Rod
4.	"No Guarantees (My People)"	Panik
5.	"Who Woulda Thought" (featuring El Da Sensei)	D.L. Jones
6.	"This Is It Y'All"	Memo
7.	"Interlude"	Shake Diggy; Rasco
8.	"The Jamm"	Protest
9.	"Message From the Bottle"	Panik
10.	"Thin Line"	Mr. Khaliyl
11.	"Living Voices"	J. Rawls
12.	"We Live This" (featuring Protest)	Protest
13.	"Rockin It"	Roddy Rod
14.	"Interlude"	Rasco
15.	"Sunshine (Ayanna)"	Mr. Khaliyl
16.	"Gunz Still Hot (Remix)" (featuring Ed O.G. and Reks)	Memo
17.	"What Y'All Want" (featuring Planet Asia and 427)	Roddy Rod
