= Styles, Crews, Flows, Beats =

EP by Peanut Butter Wolf
- Released: December 8, 1998
- Genre: Hip hop
- Label: Copasetik Records; Stones Throw
- Producer: Peanut Butter Wolf; DJ Babu

Peanut Butter Wolf chronology
My Vinyl Weighs a Ton Instrumentals (1998)	Styles, Crews, Flows, Beats (1998)	Peanut Butter Breaks (2001)

Styles, Crews, Flows, Beats is a vinyl EP by Peanut Butter Wolf, released in 1998 on Stones Throw, and in the UK on Copasetik Records. This EP features two tracks later released on Peanut Butter Wolf's 1999 album My Vinyl Weighs a Ton, with the remaining five tracks unavailable elsewhere.

== Track listing ==
Track listing
#	Title	Composer(s)	Performer(s)	Producer(s)	Time
A1	"Styles, Crews, Flows, Beats"	C. Manak; J. Brown; O. Jackson Jr. R. Jimenez	Peanut Butter Wolf; Lootpack; Quasimoto	Peanut Butter Wolf	5:50
A2	"Day Two"	C. Manak	Peanut Butter Wolf	Peanut Butter Wolf	0:14
A3	"What Abouts the Beats?"	C. Manak	Peanut Butter Wolf	Peanut Butter Wolf	5:50
A4	"Day 3"	C. Manak	Peanut Butter Wolf	Peanut Butter Wolf	0:15
B1	"Casio"	C. Manak; C. Oroc	Peanut Butter Wolf	Peanut Butter Wolf; DJ Babu	3:50
B2	"Casio Beats"	C. Manak	Peanut Butter Wolf	Peanut Butter Wolf	3:50
B3	"PBWolf vs. Mothra"	C. Manak	Peanut Butter Wolf	Peanut Butter Wolf	1:46

== Personnel ==
Contributors
Producers
Producer(s)	Peanut Butter Wolf, DJ Babu
Executive Producer(s)	Peanut Butter Wolf
Performers
Lead vocals and rapping	Peanut Butter Wolf, Lootpack, Quasimoto
Additional and background vocals
Technicians
Mixing	Peanut Butter Wolf
Engineering	Isaac Barrera
Mastering	Ken Lee
Design	MC ILL
