= Shree K. Nayar =

Indian-American engineer

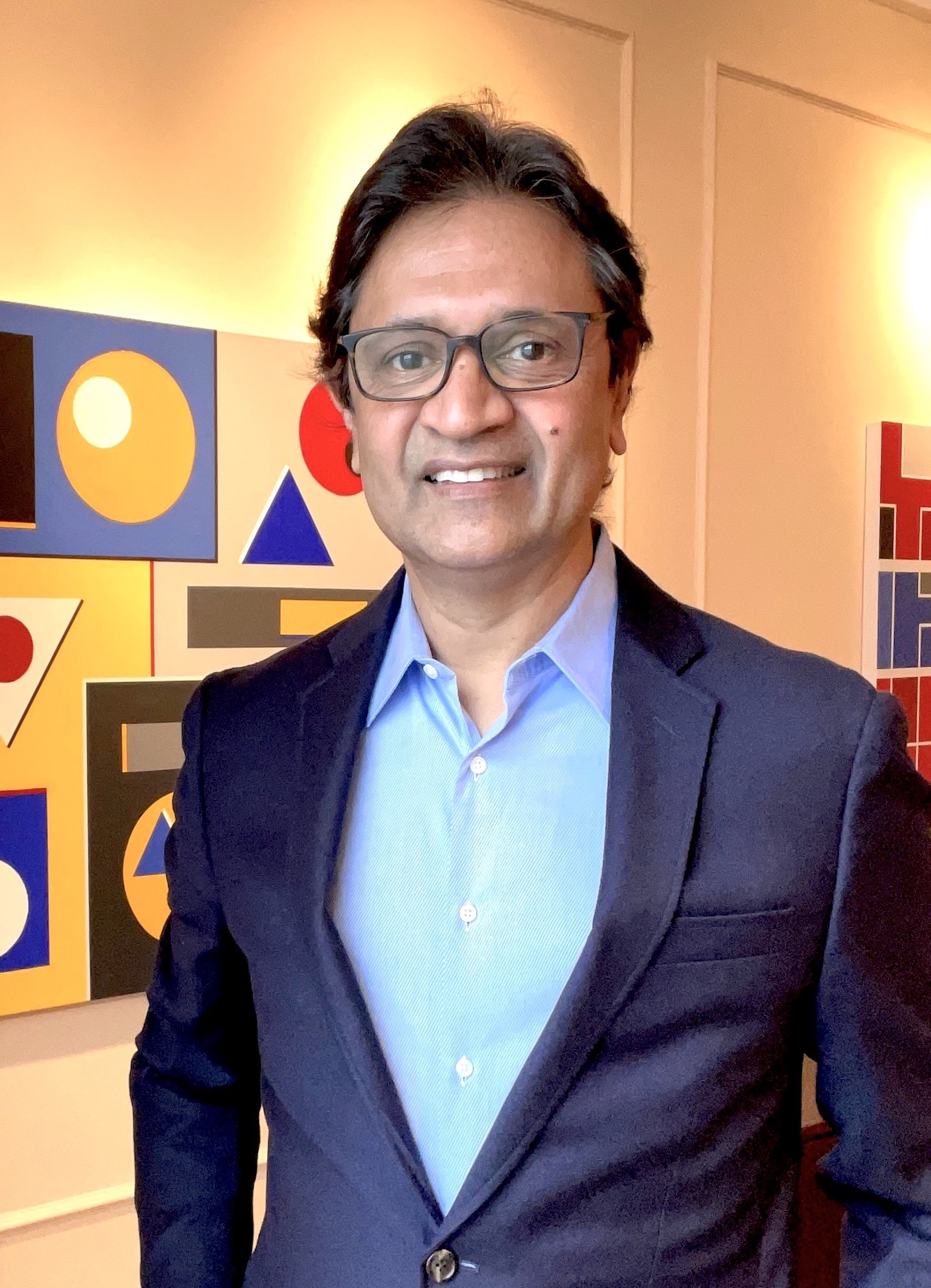
- Education: Birla Institute of Technology, Mesra; North Carolina State University, Raleigh; Carnegie Mellon University, Pittsburgh
- Known for: Computational Cameras; Physics Based Computer Vision; Oren–Nayar Reflectance Model; Bigshot Camera for Education; First Principles of Computer Vision
- Relatives: Pattom A. Thanu Pillai (grandfather)
- Awards: David Marr Prize; Columbia Great Teacher Award; National Academy of Engineering; American Academy of Arts and Sciences
- Scientific career
- Fields: Computational imaging, computer vision, computer graphics, robotics, human-computer interactions
- Workplaces: Columbia University
- Academic advisors: Katsushi Ikeuchi; Takeo Kanade

Shree K. Nayar is an Indian American engineer and computer scientist known for his contributions to the fields of computer vision, computational imaging, and computer graphics. He is the T. C. Chang Professor of Computer Science in the School of Engineering at Columbia University. Nayar co-directs the Columbia Vision and Graphics Center and is the head of the Columbia Imaging and Vision Laboratory (CAVE), which develops advanced imaging and computer vision systems. Nayar also served as a director of research at Snap Inc. He was elected member of the US National Academy of Engineering in 2008 and the American Academy of Arts and Sciences in 2011 for his pioneering work on computational cameras and physics based computer vision.

== Early life ==
Shree K. Nayar was born to Malayali Nair parents from Travancore. He is the grandson of former Chief Minister of Kerala Pattom A. Thanu Pillai.

== Education and career ==
Nayar received a B.E. in electrical engineering from Birla Institute of Technology in Mesra, in 1984, and an M.S. in electrical and computer engineering from North Carolina State University in Raleigh in 1986. He received a Ph.D. in electrical and computer engineering from The Robotics Institute at Carnegie Mellon University in Pittsburgh in 1991.

Nayar worked as a research engineer for Taylor Instruments in New Delhi in 1984. From 1986 to 1990 he was a graduate research assistant at The Robotics Institute at Carnegie Mellon University. In the summer of 1989, he was a visiting researcher at Hitachi in Yokohama, Japan. He joined the faculty of the Computer Science Department at Columbia University in 1991, and in 2009 he became chair of the department. Nayar also served as a director of research at Snap

== Research ==
Nayar's research is in the fields of computational imaging and computer vision and focuses on the creation of novel cameras, physics based models for vision and graphics, and algorithms for image understanding. His work is motivated by applications in the fields of digital imaging, computer vision, computer graphics, robotics, and human-computer interactions. Nayar developed the concept of computational cameras. The field of computational photography is organized according to a taxonomy proposed by him.

Nayar's inventions include cameras that can capture 360 degree, high dynamic range, and three-dimensional images. He demonstrated the concept of a self-powered camera that can produce video using power harvested by the light captured by the camera without requiring an external power source. His method of using assorted pixels for single-shot high dynamic range imaging has been incorporated into image sensors that are currently being used by cameras in smartphones, tablets and other mobile devices. A recent example of assorted pixels is the widely used Quad Bayer image sensor. In 2017, Popular Photography published a profile of Nayar that describes his impact on digital imaging and smartphone cameras.

Nayar developed the Oren–Nayar Reflectance Model in collaboration with Michael Oren in 1994, which is used in commercial graphics rendering packages. In 2009, he created the Bigshot Camera, a kid-friendly digital camera designed for experiential learning. Workshops and programs designed around the Bigshot camera have been used to educate middle school students around the world, in particular in underserved communities. As of November 2025, he has published over 300 scientific publications, holds over 100 patents on inventions related to imaging, computer vision and robotics, his publications have been cited over 72,000 times, and he has an h-index of 142. In March 2021, Nayar made publicly available a lecture series titled First Principles of Computer Vision.

== Recognition ==
Nayar has received several best paper awards for his scientific publications, including the David Marr Prize in 1990 and 1995, and the Helmholtz Prize in 2019. Early in his career, he received the National Young Investigator Award from the National Science Foundation in 1991 and the Packard Fellowship from the David and Lucile Packard Foundation in 1992. For the impact of his research, he was honored with the NTT Distinguished Scientific Achievement Award from NTT Corporation in 1994, the Appreciation Honor from Sony Corporation in 2014, the 2016 Invention Award from Popular Science magazine, the PAMI Distinguished Award from IEEE in 2019, the Funai Achievement Award from the Information Processing Society of Japan in 2021, and the Okawa Prize from the Okawa Foundation in 2022. He has been recognized as a teacher with the Keck Engineering Teaching Excellence Award from the W. M. Keck Foundation in 1995, the Columbia Great Teacher Award from the Society of Columbia Graduates in 2006, and the Distinguished Faculty Teaching Award from the Columbia Engineering Alumni Association in 2015. He received the Alumni Achievement Award from Carnegie Mellon University in 2009 and the Distinguished Alumnus Award from the Birla Institute of Technology, Mesra, in 2021. For his research contributions and inventions in the fields of computational imaging and computer vision, he was elected to the National Academy of Engineering in 2008, the American Academy of Arts and Sciences in 2011, the National Academy of Inventors in 2014, and the Indian National Academy of Engineering in 2022.
