= Eldridge Holmes =

Eldridge Holmes (1942 – November 13, 1998) was a New Orleans singer who recorded throughout the 1960s and into the 1970s, primarily with producer Allen Toussaint. First recorded by Toussaint in a traditional New Orleans R&B style on Poor Me, Holmes progressed to soul and funk, occasionally achieving release on national labels, but never cracking the R&B charts. He seems to have stopped recording by the mid-70s.

A native of Violet, Louisiana, according to the Funky 16 Corners web site, Holmes died in November 1998 after working variously as a bus driver, nursing assistant, asbestos worker and mechanic.

== Singles discography ==
- "Poor Me" c/w "CC Rider" (Alon 9004)
- "The Sooner You Realize" c/w "Begging For Your Love" (Alon 9010)
- "I've Got To Keep On Trying" c/w "Lover of the Land" (Alon 9013)
- "Popcorn Pop, Pop" c/w "Be My Baby" (Alon 9016)
- "Emperor Jones" c/w "A Time For Everything" (Alon 9022)
- "Gone Gone Gone" c/w "Worried Over You" (Jet Set 765)
- "Hump Back" c/w "I Like What You Do" (Jet Set 1006)
- "Without A Word" c/w "Until The End" (Sansu 469)
- "Beverly" c/w "Wait For Me Baby" (Sansu 477)
- "Beverly" c/w "Wait For Me Baby" (Pama 746)
- "Where is Love" c/w "Now That I've Lost You" (Deesu 320)
- "Where is Love" c/w "Now That I've Lost You" (Decca 32416)
- "Working in a Coal Mine" c/w "A Love Problem" (Decca 32488)
- "The Book" c/w "No Substitute" (Deesu 300)
- "If I Were A Carpenter" c/w "No Substitute" (Deesu 303)
- "Lovely Woman" c/w "What's Your Name" (Deesu 305)
- "Pop Popcorn Children" c/w "Cheating Woman" (Atco 6701)
- "Love Affair" c/w "Selfish Woman" (Brown Sugar 101)
- "Let's Go Steady" c/w "An Open Letter to My Love" (Kansu 100)
