= Fire & Ice (Cali Agents album) =

Studio album by Cali Agents
- Released: November 7, 2006
- Recorded: 2006
- Studio: Unite Studios (San Jose, CA); Ghost Recon Studios
- Genre: Hip-hop
- Length: 48:09
- Label: Pockets Linted Entertainment
- Producer: Brisk One; Dialekt; Protest; Soul Professa

Cali Agents chronology
How the West Was One (2000)	Fire & Ice (2006)

Professional ratings
Review scores
Source	Rating
AllMusic	3.5/5 stars

Fire & Ice is the second full-length studio album by American hip-hop duo Cali Agents. It was released on November 7, 2006, via Pockets Linted Entertainment. Recording sessions took place at Unite Studios in San Jose, California and at Ghost Recon Studios. Production was handled by Soul Professa, Brisk One, Dialekt and Protest, with CT Life and Rasco serving as executive producers. It features guest appearances from Concise Kilgore and Turbin.

== Track listing ==
No.	Title	Writer(s)	Producer(s)	Length
1.	"Intro"		Soul Professa	0:26
2.	"Fire & Ice"	Jason Green; Keida Brewer	Soul Professa	2:33
3.	"The Science"	Green; Brewer	Soul Professa	4:02
4.	"Baby Girl"	Green; Brewer	Soul Professa	4:12
5.	"Get That Money" (featuring Turbin)	Green; Brewer; Ronnie Sean Real	Soul Professa	3:47
6.	"Interlude"		Soul Professa	0:30
7.	"Something New"	Green; Brewer	Soul Professa	3:52
8.	"Breakdawn"	Green; Brewer	Dialekt	3:35
9.	"What It Is" (featuring Concise Kilgore)	Green; Brewer; Tavie Mason	Brisk One	4:02
10.	"Hot Ass Summer"	Green	Protest	3:38
11.	"Interlude"		Soul Professa	0:23
12.	"Bang"	Green; Brewer	Soul Professa	3:52
13.	"Microphone Madness"	Green; Brewer	Soul Professa	3:59
14.	"More of the Same/Duck Down"	Green; Brewer	Soul Professa	9:18
Total length:				48:09

== Personnel ==
- Jason "Planet Asia" Green – vocals (tracks: 2–5, 7–10, 12–14)
- Keida "Rasco" Brewer – vocals (tracks: 2–5, 7–9, 12–14), executive producer
- Ron Real – vocals (track 5)
- Tavie "Concise Kilgore" Mason – vocals (track 9)
- Alfred "Brisk One" Martinez Jr. – scratches (track 3), producer (track 9), mixing (tracks: 1–9, 11–14)
- Marvin "Soul Professa" Coady – producer (tracks: 1–7, 11–14)
- Dialekt – producer (track 8)
- Roger "Protest" Roberts – producer (track 10)
- Walter "Walt Liquor" Taylor – mixing (track 10)
- CT Life – executive producer
- Justin Herman – design, layout
