= The Funky 16 Corners =

Compilation album by Various Artists
- Released: November 1, 2001
- Recorded: 1968–1974
- Genre: Deep funk, funk, soul
- Label: Stones Throw
- Producer: James Bell; Clarence Butler; Cut Chemist; William O. Douglas; Marsha Frazier; Spider Harrison; Conrad Johnson; Don Logan; Herbie Miller; Soul Vibrations; Bubbha Thomas; Ernest Williams

Stones Throw Records chronology
The Funky 16 Corners (2001)	Peanut Butter Wolf's Jukebox 45's (2002)

Professional ratings
Review scores
Source	Rating
AllMusic	4.5/5 stars
Pitchfork	(9.5/10)

The Funky 16 Corners is a compilation of funk songs and instrumentals recorded by little-known performers from across the United States during the late 1960s and the early and mid 1970s. The album, released on Stones Throw Records in 2001, pays homage to these forgotten funk bands and musicians.

== Track listing ==
1. "Intro" - 0:43
  - Performed by Ebony Rhythm Band
2. "Dap Walk" - 3:05
  - Performed by Ernie & The Top Notes
3. "Let's Go (It's Summertime)" - 2:45
  - Performed by James Reese & The Progressions
4. "Trespasser" - 5:49
  - Performed by Bad Medicine
5. "The Funky 16 Corners" - 5:18
  - Performed by The Highlighters
6. "The Kick" - 6:20
  - Performed by The Rhythm Machine
7. "What About You (In The World Today)" - 2:51
  - Performed by Co Real Artists
8. "Interlude" - 0:40
  - Performed by Ebony Rhythm Band
9. "The Dump" - 2:41
  - Performed by Soul Vibrations
10. "Jody's Freeze" - 2:55
  - Performed by James Reese & The Progressions
11. "Kashmere" - 4:57
  - Performed by Kashmere Stage Band
12. "Fish Head" - 2:35
  - Performed by Slim & The Soulful Saints
13. "Tighten Up Tighter" - 2:13
  - Performed by Billy Ball & The Upsetters featuring Roosevelt Matthews
14. "Southside Funk" - 4:12
  - Performed by The Soul Seven
15. "Can We Rap" - 2:13
  - Performed by Carleen & The Groovers
16. "Beautiful Day" 2:51
  - Performed by Spider Harrison
17. "Go To Work [Alternate Version]" 3:43
  - Performed by Revolution Compared To What
18. "The Phantom" - 2:19
  - Performed by Bubbha Thomas & The Lightmen Plus One
19. "In The Rain" 4:39
  - Performed by The Wooden Glass featuring Billy Wooten
20. "Outro" 1:08
  - Performed by Ebony Rhythm Band
21. "Bunky's Pick [Bonus Track]" 7:25
  - Performed by Cut Chemist
22. "The Funky Buzzard [Bonus Track]" 2:23
  - Performed by James Bell & The Turner Brothers

== Credits ==
- Executive producer: Peanut Butter Wolf
- Mastering: Gene Grimaldi, Matt Mahaffey
- Engineering: George Day, Harry Deal & the Galaxies, Bob Edwards, Otis Forrest, Joel Johnson
- Editing: Gene Grimaldi
- Drums: Ron Anderson, Harold Cardwell, Leon "Ndugu" Chancler, Richard Clarke, Dwayne "Buzzard" Garvin, Willie Hill, Bubbha Thomas, Matthew R. Watson, Cliff Williams, Dino Zimmerman
- Tenor saxophone: Larry Blake, Joe Hardy, Doug Harris, Teddy Patterson, Leslie Pippens
- Alto saxophone: Martin Williams
- Soprano saxophone: Doug Harris
- Saxophone: Doug Harris, Jim Honeycutt, Jesse Jones Jr., George Miller, David Morton, Clyde Walker
- Guitar: Jamie Brantley, Lee Martin, John Scott, Rob Townsend, Ernest Williams, Dino Zimmerman
- Trumpet: Clarence Butler, Carlos, Ronnie Davis, Freddie Green, Michael "Mike Dee" Johnson, Audrey Jones, William Perry, Soup, John Thomas, Pat Williams
- Bass: Tony Davis, Greg Johnson, Lester "Lammy" Johnson, David Stevens
- Flute: Marsha Frazier
- Piano: Marsha Frazier
- Electric piano: Marsha Frazier
- Trombone: Charles Hunt, Alexander J. Nichols, James Reese, Jimmy Walker
- Conga: Munyungo Jackson
- Organ: James Reese, Emanuel Riggins
- Vibraphone: Billy Wooten
