= Head of the State (album) =

EP by Cali Agents
- Released: March 9, 2004
- Recorded: 2003–2004
- Studio: Quality Control Studios (Oakland, CA); The Pool Room (San Francisco, CA); Hyde Street Studios (San Francisco, CA)
- Genre: Hip-hop
- Length: 31:47
- Label: Pockets Linted Entertainment
- Producer: Architect; Brisk One; Champ!; Richness; Superflexxxx; Vin Roc

Cali Agents chronology
How the West Was One (2000)	Head of the State (2004)	Fire & Ice (2006)

Professional ratings
Review scores
Source	Rating
RapReviews	8.5/10

Head of the State is an extended play by American hip-hop duo Cali Agents. It was released on March 9, 2004, via Pockets Linted Entertainment. Recording sessions took place at Quality Control Studios in Oakland, The Pool Room and Hyde Street Studios in San Francisco. Production was handled by Architect, Vin Roc, Brisk One, Champ, Richness and Superflexxxx, with Javier Laval and Rasco serving as executive producers.

== Track listing ==
No.	Title	Producer(s)	Length
1.	"Intro"	Architect	0:51
2.	"Sharp"	Vin Roc	3:29
3.	"Cali Nights"	Vin Roc	3:33
4.	"In the Zone"	Brisk One	4:31
5.	"Rewrap"	Champ; Superflexxxx	3:50
6.	"Go Ladies"	Richness	3:26
7.	"Banger"	Architect	3:39
8.	"Head of the State"	Architect	4:05
9.	"Endless"	Brisk One	4:23
Total length:			31:47

== Personnel ==
- Keida "Rasco" Brewer – vocals, executive producer
- Jason "Planet Asia" Green – vocals
- Alfred "Brisk One" Martinez Jr. – scratches (track 2), producer (tracks: 4, 9)
- Gary "Architect" Herd – scratches (track 7), producer & engineering (tracks: 1, 7, 8)
- Vincent "Vin Roc" Punsalan – producer (tracks: 2, 3)
- Champ – producer (track 5)
- Superflexxxx – producer (track 5)
- J. "Richness" Taylor – producer (track 6)
- Ghazi Shami – recording & mixing (tracks: 2–6)
- Matt Kelley – recording & mixing (track 9)
- Javier Laval – executive producer
