= The Highlighters =

U.S. funk band in the 1960s and 1970s

- Origin: Indianapolis, Indiana, U.S.
- Genres: Jazz, Funk
- Years active: 1963–1971
- Past members: Clifford Palmer; Dewayne "Funky Buzzard" Garvin; James Bell; Richard Ball; James Brantley; James Boone; James “Porkchop” Edwards; Clifford Ratliff; Richard Corbin

The Highlighters was a funk band from the U.S. city of Indianapolis with minor hits in the late 1960s and early 1970s.

== History ==
The Highlighters was originally formed in 1963 by jazz musicians at Crispus Attucks High School in Indianapolis, Indiana. After three of the band members were drafted to fight in the Vietnam War, the band reorganized as a funk band with new members. Their songs Poppin Popcorn and The Funky 16 Corners were regional hits in Indiana.

When the band's original drummer, James "Porkchop" Edwards, returned from Vietnam, he sought to rejoin. Conflict over this led to the band dissolving in 1971. Many of the band's members would continue in the music industry, like Dewayne "Funky Buzzard" Garvin, who would perform as a drummer for artists like Marvin Gaye. In 2010, trumpeter Clifford Ratliff was inducted into the Indianapolis Jazz Hall of Fame.

The band's songs were re-issued in the 1990s, and became popular with collectors. Funky 16 Corners was included on a 2001 compilation album of the same name. It was also featured on the soundtrack of the action movie Hit and Run (2012).
