= FabricLive.22 =

Compilation album by Scratch Perverts
- Released: 12 July 2005
- Genre: Electronic music
- Length: 71:43
- Label: Fabric
- Producer: Scratch Perverts

Scratch Perverts chronology
Badmeaningood Vol. 4 (2003)	FabricLive.22 (2005)

FabricLive chronology
FabricLive.21 (2005)	FabricLive.22 (2005)	FabricLive.23 (2005)

FabricLive.22 is a DJ mix compilation album by Scratch Perverts, as part of the FabricLive Mix Series.

== Track listing ==
No.	Title	Artist	Length
1.	"Come Get It"	Scratch Perverts & Dynamite MC	3:06
2.	"Ha Ha"	Ty	2:13
3.	"Born to Roll"	Masta Ace Incorporated	3:05
4.	"I’ll be Surprised"	Skinnyman	2:05
5.	"Witness" (Walworth Road Rocker’s dub)	Roots Manuva	2:43
6.	"Guns are Drawn"	The Roots	3:28
7.	"Ug Beats"	Mr. Scruff	0:58
8.	"Go In"	Die & Skitz	2:32
9.	"Party Hard"	The Perceptionists	2:26
10.	"This Way"	Dilated Peoples ft. Kanye West	3:38
11.	"Hold On"	Foreign Beggars	3:20
12.	"Fame and Money"	The Booty Bouncers	1:45
13.	"Face Smacker"	Scratch Perverts	0:48
14.	"Hip Hop"	Dead Prez	3:34
15.	"Stand By"	Scratch Perverts	3:50
16.	"G.D.M.F.S.O.B." (UNKLE uncensored mix)	DJ Shadow ft. Roots Manuva	4:19
17.	"Rocker"	Alter Ego	1:37
18.	"Time is my Everything" (Scratch Perverts vocal mix)	Ian Brown	3:30
19.	"The National Anthem"	Radiohead	5:36
20.	"Pack of Wolves" (Pendulum remix)	Nightbreed	2:28
21.	"Get Ill"	Ed Rush & Optical	2:52
22.	"Slippery Slope"	Clipz	1:47
23.	"Gimme da Gal"	DJ Phantasy, Shodan & UK Apache	3:39
24.	"Another Planet"	Pendulum	2:40
25.	"A Modern Way V.I.P."	Baron	3:42
