= Peanut Butter Wolf's Jukebox 45's =

Compilation album by Various artists
- Released: September 3, 2002
- Genre: Hip-hop; funk
- Label: Stones Throw

Stones Throw Records chronology
The Funky 16 Corners (2001)	Peanut Butter Wolf's Jukebox 45's (2002)	The Third Unheard: Connecticut Hip Hop 1979-1983 (2004)

Professional ratings
Review scores
Source	Rating
AllMusic	4/5 stars

Peanut Butter Wolf's Jukebox 45's is a compilation album of Stones Throw Records, an American hip hop label. Most of the album is performed or produced by Madlib, though other Stones Throw artists have songs as well.

== Track listing ==
1. "Chops & Thangs"
  - Performed by Beat Konducta
2. "Microphone Mathematics [Remix]"
  - Performed by Quasimoto
3. "Flowers"
  - Performed by Dudley Perkins
4. "Things Could Be Better"
  - Performed by Ernie & The Top Notes
  - Featuring Raymond Winnfield
5. "Harlem River Drive Interlude"
  - Performed by Yesterdays New Quintet
6. "I Am Singing"
  - Performed by Yesterdays New Quintet
7. "My 2600"
  - Performed by Capt. Funkaho
8. "Breaks Of Meditate"
  - Performed by Beat Conductor
9. "The Ox (Fantastic Four)"
  - Performed by Madlib Invazion
  - Featuring Medaphoar, Oh No
10. "Rocket Ship"
  - Performed by Stark Reality
11. "Place Your Bet"
  - Performed by Medaphoar
12. "Poppin' Popcorn"
  - Performed by The Highlighters Band
13. "Getcho Soul Togetha (Part Two)"
  - Performed by Breakestra
14. "Devotion '92"
  - Performed by Charizma
15. "Conducted Rhythms"
  - Performed by Beat Conductor
16. "Enter Ralph Wiggum"
  - Performed by A-Trak
17. "Take Me"
  - Performed by Fabulous Souls
18. "Color"
  - Performed by L.A. Carnival
19. "Lost Lust"
  - Performed by Beat Conductor
20. "Mystic Brew Interlude"
  - Performed by Yesterdays New Quintet
21. "Knucklehead"
  - Performed by Yesterdays New Quintet
22. "On Point"
  - Performed by Lootpack
