= Andrew Pendelton III =

American wrestler (born 1982)

Personal information
- Born: Andrew Robert Horsefield; July 10, 1982 (age 44) St. Louis, Missouri, United States

Professional wrestling career
- Ring name: Andrew Pendleton III
- Billed height: 6 ft 0 in (183 cm)
- Billed weight: 200 lb (91 kg)
- Billed from: Hollywood, California
- Trained by: Sal Rinauro; Chad Parham; Azrael; Slim J
- Debut: 2006

Andrew Robert Horsefield (born July 10, 1982) better known by his ring name Andrew Pendelton III, is an American professional wrestler. His gimmick is somewhat based on "The Million Dollar Man" Ted Dibiase from the WWE. Pendelton has worked with multiple promotions across the United States including NWA Anarchy and Deep South Wrestling.

== Career ==
=== Early career ===
Born in St. Louis, Missouri, Pendelton moved to Atlanta, Georgia at the age of 5. Eventually graduated from Roswell High School in 2001 and, began studying teaching and business at Georgia Perimeter College in Atlanta, Georgia.

Pendelton began training for a career in professional wrestling at the NWA Anarchy training school under Sal Rinauro in 2005. Eventually he began working for Mad Asylum Xtreme Wrestling in South Carolina owned by Shadow Jackson and Alternative Pro Wrestling in North Georgia owned by Rick Michaels. At APW Pendelton held the Southern States Championship belt twice during a feud with Adrian Hawkins, a title that his tag team partner J.T. Talent would go on to hold. While at MAXW Pendelton created his persona based partially on his favorite wrestler Ted Dibiase. At MAXW, Pendelton, with Ryan Michaels, Matt Sells, and Randall Johnson became a top heel stable known as the Saturday Night Sensation.

=== Sex and Money ===
In late 2006, Pendelton began a tag team with "The Obsession" Caleb Konley dubbed by promoters as Sex and Money. Pendelton and Konley traveled across the Southeast for several promotions such as GCW, Alternative Pro Wrestling, MAXW, and Georgia Wrestling Promotions. While in Georgia Wrestling Promotions, Sex and Money entered a year-long feud with The Hellbillies Jessco Blue, Tim O'Brien, and Big Head Hanson. This feud culminated into a falls count anywhere hardcore match for Georgia Wrestling Promotions in Waleska, Georgia. In NWA Anarchy a feud that paired Sex and Money with The New Wave (Derrick Driver and Steven Walters) against The Anger Alliance (Brody Ray Chase, Don Matthews, Brandon P, and Adam Roberts) led up to an 8-man tag team match at Hostile Environment 2007 at the Georgia Mountain Center. Hostile Environment 2007 was the largest event/venue ever attempted by NWA Anarchy. Pendelton and Konley with the New Wave lost the match setting up Konley's move to North Carolina to work for high spots leaving Pendelton without a tag partner.

=== Deep South Wrestling ===
On July, 5th 2007 Pendelton took part in the Inaugural Deep South Wrestling show, wrestling his former trainer Sal Rinauro. Pendelton fell short, losing to Rinauro in a hard fought match. Pendelton went on to fight Rinauro in a tag match weeks later in the Tag Team Championship Tournament, yet came up short. Rinauro went on to win the Tournament and tag team belts with Pendelton's former partner Caleb Konley. Pendelton continued working for Deep South Wrestling until their closing in November 2007.

=== NWA Anarchy ===
Pendelton began working for NWA Anarchy in late 2006. He appeared in his first televised match against Jason Blackman. He spent the rest of 2006 working matches as needed for Anarchy against such stars as Onyx, Mikael Judas, Austin Creed and Kory Chavis to name a few.

After the breakup of Sex and Money, Pendelton teamed up with former trainee J.T. Talent to create Talent and Money. Pendelton and Talent found their niche quickly and picked up bookings with several federations. Talent and Money began moving up the rankings at NWA Anarchy getting more promos, vignettes, and more developed storylines. Talent and Money began to feud with the New Wave (Derrick Driver and Steven Walters) and the Wild Bunch (Billy Buck and Chris King). The interference of the Hollywood Brunettes (Kyle Matthews and Andrew Alexander) led to a 4-way ladder match for the number one contendership for the tag team titles at NWA Anarchy. The match took place at Hostile Environment 2008 in Cornelia, Georgia in front of a sold-out crowd. Although the Wild Bunch won the match and received the contract for the tag team title shot, the match received rave reviews, was billed as one of the greatest matches in NWA Anarchy history, and was named Georgia Wrestling Match of the Year.

=== World Wrestling Entertainment ===
Pendelton was given the opportunity to go to a RAW house show in Columbia, South Carolina on March 24, 2008 and a SmackDown house show in Fayetteville, North Carolina on March 25, 2008 as an extra talent. However, he did not get the opportunity to wrestle at either event.

=== Feud with New Wave ===
Talent and Money began 2009 feuding with then NWA Anarchy Tag Team Champions the New Wave. At an NWA Anarchy television taping in January 2009, Talent and Money violently attacked the New Wave (Cash Wheeler and Derrick Driver) after they defended their Titles against The Technicians. Talent and Money left the New Wave bloodied after several belt shots to the head.

Over the next several weeks, Talent and Money and the New Wave constantly attacked each other both before and after their scheduled matches. Talent and Money defeated the New Wave in a Tag Team Championship match during an NWA Anarchy television taping in February 2009. Talent and Money's win was somewhat debated due to interference by Seth Delay and Brody Chase and an on-air payoff by Andrew Pendelton III.

At this point NWA Anarchy's owner Jerry Palmer stepped in because the attacks put the fans in jeopardy. The fans demanded action, so Jerry Palmer scheduled a Tag Team Championship match between Champions Talent and Money and the New Wave at NWA Anarchy's major show Hostile Environment 2009. Ironically, many believe that the 4-way ladder match at Hostile Environment 2008 was what catapulted both Talent and Money and the New Wave into the spotlight.

The feud culminated in a no disqualification, no count out, falls count anywhere match at Hostile Environment. The match immediately became an ultraviolent bloodfest with chairs, tables, and anything the wrestlers could get their hands on. Several first's for the NWA Anarchy Arena saw Steven Walters allow a fan to hit Andrew Pendelton III in the head with a chair, Steven Walter's pinfall attempt on Andrew Pendelton III on top of the announce table, and Derrick Driver diving from the ceiling onto Talent and Money.

The amount of blood quickly became dangerous. J.T. Talent bled from head to toe, requiring immediate medical attention after the match. All of the wrestlers were covered in blood as was the ring and floor. Georgia Wrestling History reporter Larry Goodman claimed the match contained "the most brutal and bloody punishment in NWA Anarchy History".

The match ended with New Wave hitting a spanish fly on J.T. Talent from the top rope through a table. The New Wave won the NWA Anarchy Tag Team Championships for a second time.

== Championships and accomplishments ==
- Alternative Pro Wrestling
  - APW Southern States Championship (2 times)
- NWA Anarchy
  - NWA Anarchy Tag Team Championship (3 times) – J.T. Talent (2), Bryan Casanova (1)
  - NWA Anarchy Young Lions Championship (1 time)
- Other titles
  - SCWA Light Heavyweight Championship (1 time)
