= Big Shots (album) =

Studio album by Charizma & Peanut Butter Wolf
- Released: November 18, 2003
- Recorded: 1991–1993
- Studio: Studio Apogee, San Jose, California
- Genre: West Coast hip hop
- Length: 46:24
- Label: Stones Throw Records
- Producer: Peanut Butter Wolf

Charizma & Peanut Butter Wolf chronology
Big Shots (2003)	Big Shots Bonus EP (2004)

Singles from Big Shots
- 1. "My World Premiere" Released: 1996; 2. "Devotion" Released: 2000; 3. "Here's a Smirk" Released: 2003; 4. "Jack the Mack" Released: 2003

Big Shots is a studio album by American hip hop duo Charizma & Peanut Butter Wolf. Recorded between 1991 and 1993 for Hollywood BASIC, it was released on Stones Throw Records in 2003, 10 years after Charizma's death. It peaked at number 2 on CMJ's Hip-Hop chart, as well as number 27 on the CMJ Radio 200 chart. The first single from the album, titled "My World Premiere", was originally released in 1996.

== Critical reception ==
Professional ratings
Review scores
Source	Rating
AllMusic	3/5 stars
The A.V. Club	favorable
CMJ New Music Monthly	favorable
Dusted Magazine	favorable
East Bay Express	favorable
HipHopDX	4.0/5
Metro Silicon Valley	favorable
RapReviews.com	6/10
Spin	favorable
XLR8R	favorable

Sam Samuelson of AllMusic gave the album 3 stars out of 5, calling it "a treasure that should be cherished by hip-hop fans the world over." Todd Inoue of Metro Silicon Valley said, "Charizma sounds like MC Shan blessed with youthful lung capacity while PB Wolf makes like Marley Marl programming beats in DJ Premier's lab." Ross Hogg of XLR8R said, "Charizma's voice brims with eagerness, enthusiasm and earnestness; Wolf's textured, jazzy beats epitomize boom bap and are a sign of great things to come."

Nathan Rabin of The A.V. Club said, "while Big Shots is one of those charmed debuts where nearly every song sounds like a terrific single, it wouldn't be without Wolf, whose gorgeously constructed tracks, flawless ear for melody, and extensive sonic quotations anticipate Madlib." Rachel Swan of East Bay Express said, "had Charizma not been shot and killed in '93, he might've turned into another Pharoahe Monch or J-Live."

In 2003, East Bay Express included it on the "Best Music of the East Bay" list. In 2007, The A.V. Club included it on the "10 Unjustly Overlooked Hip-Hop Classics" list.

== Track listing ==
No.	Title	Length
1.	"Here's a Smirk"	3:31
2.	"Methods"	4:07
3.	"Jack the Mack"	3:10
4.	"Talk About a Girl"	1:24
5.	"Red Light Green Light"	2:40
6.	"Tell You Something"	3:38
7.	"Gatha Round"	3:00
8.	"Devotion"	3:59
9.	"Apple Juice Break"	0:38
10.	"My World Premiere"	2:07
11.	"Ice Cream Truck"	3:37
12.	"Charizma What"	3:47
13.	"Fair Weathered Friend"	4:04
14.	"Soon to Be Large"	3:15
15.	"Pacin' the Floor"	3:27

European edition CD bonus disc
No.	Title	Length
1.	"Gatha Round (Original Version)"	4:42
2.	"Devotion (Harp Version)"	4:13
3.	"High School Love"	4:05
4.	"Take It Easy"	0:37
5.	"Just Like a Test"	2:47
6.	"Bless You"	3:25
7.	"Red Light Green Light (Remix)"	3:02
8.	"Vapors"	4:42

== Personnel ==
Credits adapted from the CD liner notes.

- Charizma – vocals
- Peanut Butter Wolf – production, executive production
- Peter Stanley – recording
- Dave Cooley – mastering
- Jeff Jank – design, photography
- Theresa Castro – photography
- Egon – label management
