= Big Shots Bonus EP =

EP by Charizma
- Released: June 2004
- Recorded: 1991–1993
- Genre: Hip hop
- Label: Stones Throw
- Producer: Peanut Butter Wolf

Charizma chronology
Big Shots (2003)	Big Shots Bonus EP (2004)

Big Shots Bonus EP is a follow-up album to Charizma & Peanut Butter Wolf's Big Shots album. Similar to Big Shots, this album is produced entirely by PB Wolf, however it includes tracks that were not on the former album. This album was released only in vinyl format.

== Track listing ==
#	Title	Composer(s)	Performer(s)	Producer(s)	Time
A1	"Gatha Round [Original Version]"	C. Hicks; C. Manak	Charizma	Peanut Butter Wolf	4:42
A2	"Devotion [Harp Version]"	C. Hicks; C. Manak	Charizma	Peanut Butter Wolf	4:11
A3	"High School Love"	C. Hicks; C. Manak	Charizma	Peanut Butter Wolf	4:05
A4	"Take It Easy (Interlude)"	C. Hicks; C. Manak	Charizma	Peanut Butter Wolf	0:37
B1	"Just Like A Test"	C. Hicks; C. Manak	Charizma	Peanut Butter Wolf	2:47
B2	"Bless You"	C. Hicks; C. Manak	Charizma	Peanut Butter Wolf	3:24
B3	"Red Light, Green Light [Remix]"	C. Hicks; C. Manak	Charizma	Peanut Butter Wolf	3:00
B4	"Vapors"	C. Hicks; C. Manak	Charizma	Peanut Butter Wolf	4:44
