= Bigshot (digital camera) =

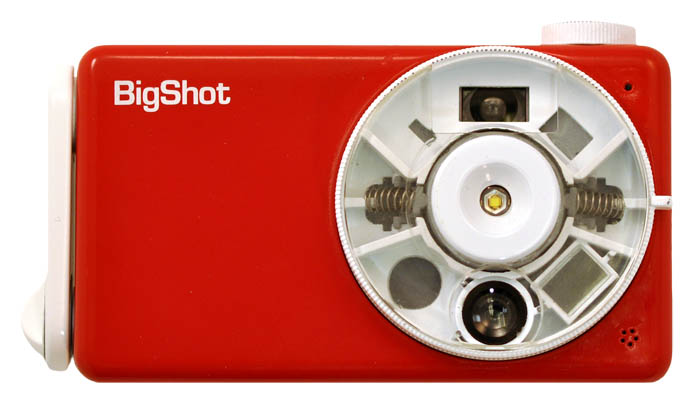
The Bigshot camera incorporates human-generated power and a lens wheel that allows users to choose from three different lens settings: normal, panoramic, and stereo view.

Bigshot's back face includes a label for each component.

Bigshot is a digital camera designed by Shree K. Nayar at Columbia University's Computer Vision Laboratory for experiential learning. The design was conceived in 2006, went into prototype in 2009, had trials in 2011, and was put into production and worldwide distribution in August 2013.

== History ==
According to several interviews with Nayar, the idea of creating a camera for experiential learning stemmed from the 2004 film Born into Brothels, an Academy Award-winning documentary by Ross Kauffman and Zana Briski that profiles several children living in the red light district of Kolkata. The filmmaker gave each child a camera and taught them photography so that they could begin to look at their world with a new set of eyes, unveiling hope and uncovering hidden talents from within themselves. As a result, many of them found the strength to break from their circumstances and begin charting out meaningful lives. Nayar launched the Bigshot project in 2006, and the first set of Bigshot cameras were produced for use in pilot workshops in 2009. In August 2013, EduScience, a Hong Kong-based manufacturer of toys and kits for learning, began distribution worldwide.

== Features ==
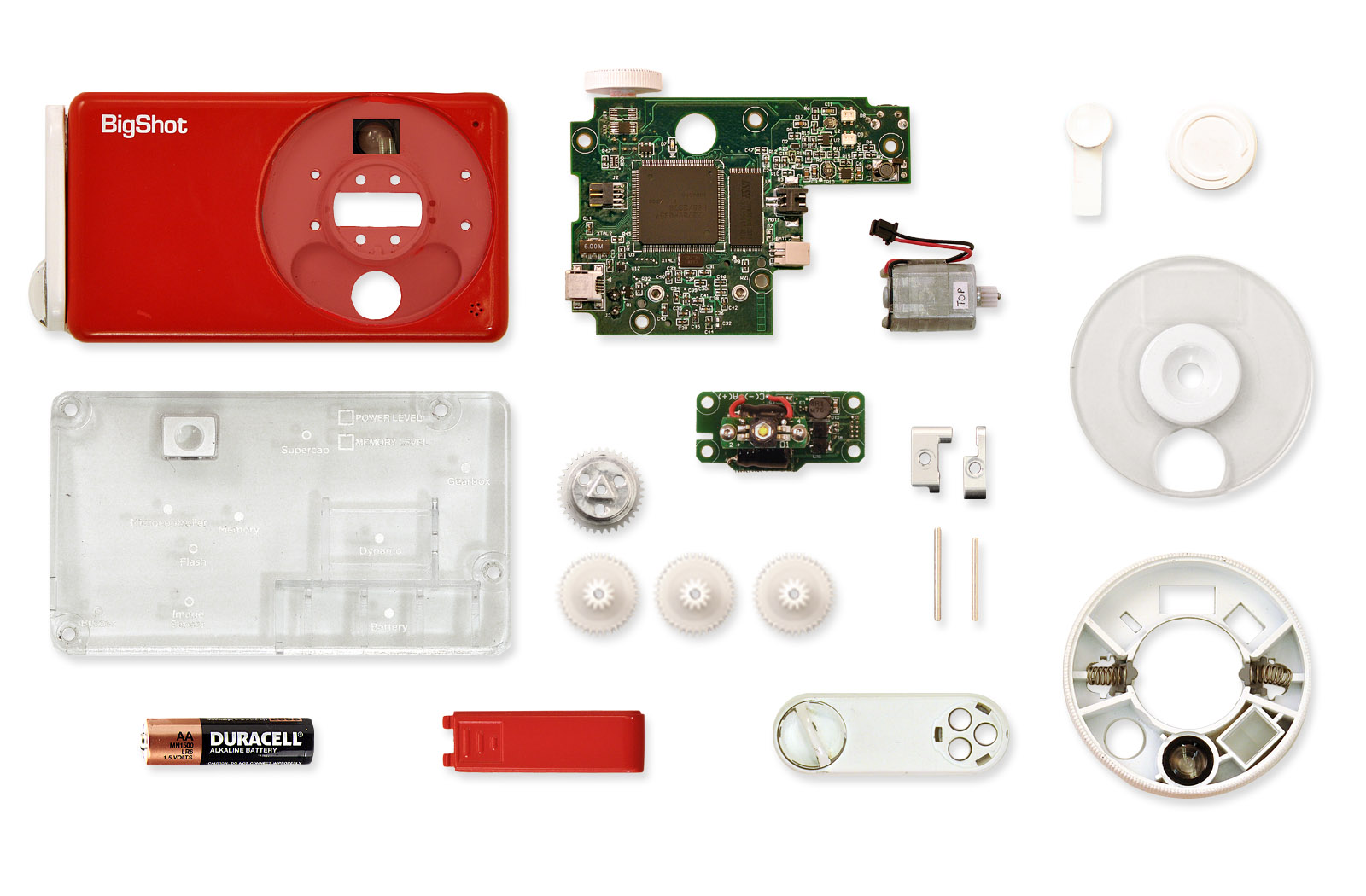
The kit of parts that students assemble in the Bigshot prototypes

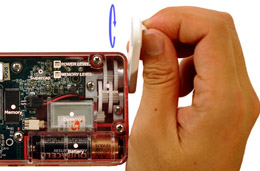
The hand crank power generator as it appears in the Bigshot prototypes.

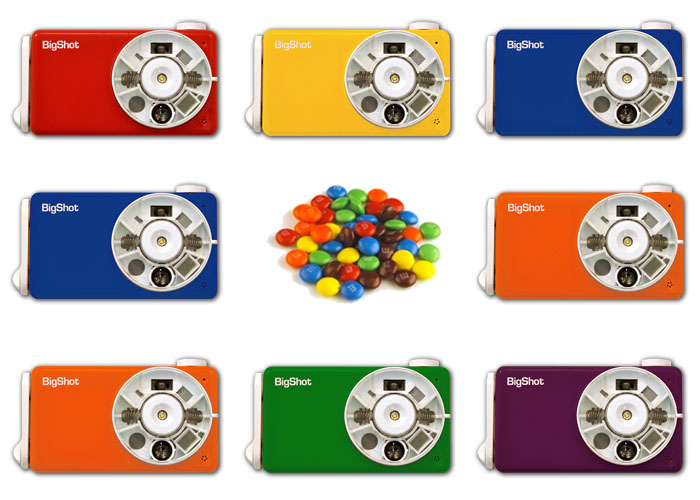
The Bigshot prototypes are produced in an array of fun candy-inspired colors, reminiscent of M&M's candies.

- A build-it-yourself kit that students can use
- A transparent back cover with labels for each major component
- A companion website with interactive demos that teach the science and engineering concepts behind each component
- A normal lens with a 43° field of view
- A panoramic lens with a 72° field of view
- A stereo prism to take 3D anaglyph images
- A polyoptic lens wheel to allow users to change lenses just by rotating the wheel
- A hand crank to power the camera without any batteries
- Colors inspired by M&M's candies

== Reception ==
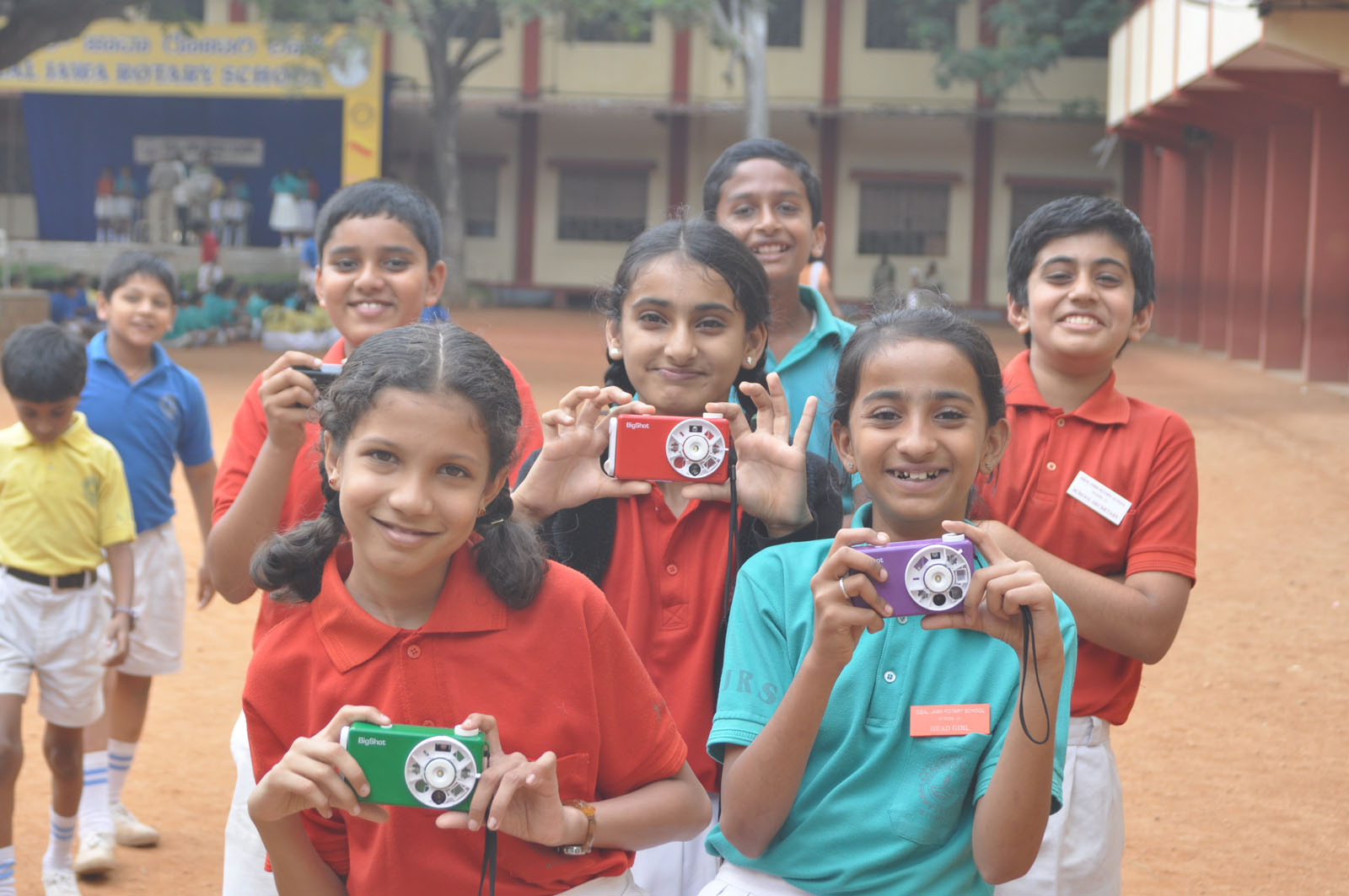
Students in Bangalore, India during a pilot workshop

As of June 2010, a consumer-level version of Bigshot had not yet been made available for purchase, and thus had not been reviewed by camera and electronics professional reviewers. However, prototypes of the camera have been used for community outreach workshops in New York City, Bangalore, Vũng Tàu, and Tokyo, with over 200 children as well as their parents and teachers. Feedback from workshop participants has generally been positive, with several students reporting an increased interest in photography and many teachers praising its ability to promote STEM education. Nayar has indicated that the purpose of the workshops was to explore ways that the camera might address the challenges of children in under-served communities with low access to technology.
