= Mickey & the Soul Generation =

Mickey & the Soul Generation were a funk band from San Antonio, Texas. The group formed in the late 1960s in the midst of the Texas funk scene, which consisted mostly of locally and regionally known bands but which was extraordinarily prolific (and known today mostly through hip hop sampling and reissues on labels such as Jazzman Records).

== History ==
Mickey Foster and Emil Carter first played together in a Latino soul group called The Royal Tokens. The two split from the group to form a new band; picking up George Salas and Gilbert Rivera, they called themselves "The Fabulous Four". After further lineup changes, the group became "The Fabulous Five", "Mickey and the Fabulous Five" and lastly "Mickey and the Soul Generation". The group won several local talent shows and began recording in a local Tejano studio. Their 1969 single, "Iron Leg", was picked up for distribution nationwide by Maxwell Records, a New York City label, and the 45 sold well regionally in Florida, California, and Texas. At the height of its popularity, it was used in a segment by Nipsey Russell on a routine he did for The Tonight Show.

After the release of a second single, "Football", the group went on tour, opening for Sam & Dave, The Supremes, Clarence Carter, and Kool & the Gang in the American South and Midwest. After moving to New York to fill an opening slot for fellow Maxwell artists Faith, Hope & Charity, the group split with its label over monetary disputes and returned to Texas. Further recording ensued at local studios, but the group soon splintered, recording its last singles in 1973.

Mickey & the Soul Generation saw little widespread success while active as a band. However, the group became better known when Josh Davis (DJ Shadow) began interpolating their music into his records and mixes. Davis, who called the group his 'favorite funk band', collected the group's recordings and had them reissued on Cali-Tex records in 2002 in the double LP and double CD formats. The reissue, Iron Leg, won highly positive reviews from many press outlets. Since then, the group's material has also shown up on funk compilations on record labels such as Jazzman Records.

== Members ==
- Gilbert Rivera - bass
- Andrew Gordon - drums
- George Salas - guitar
- Mickey Foster - organ
- Johnny Hooks - tenor sax
- Emil Carter - vocals, sax
- Harvey Edmerson - drums (deceased)
- Charles Johnson - vocals
- Chris Urrutia - drums
