= Chris Rolle =

American dramatist

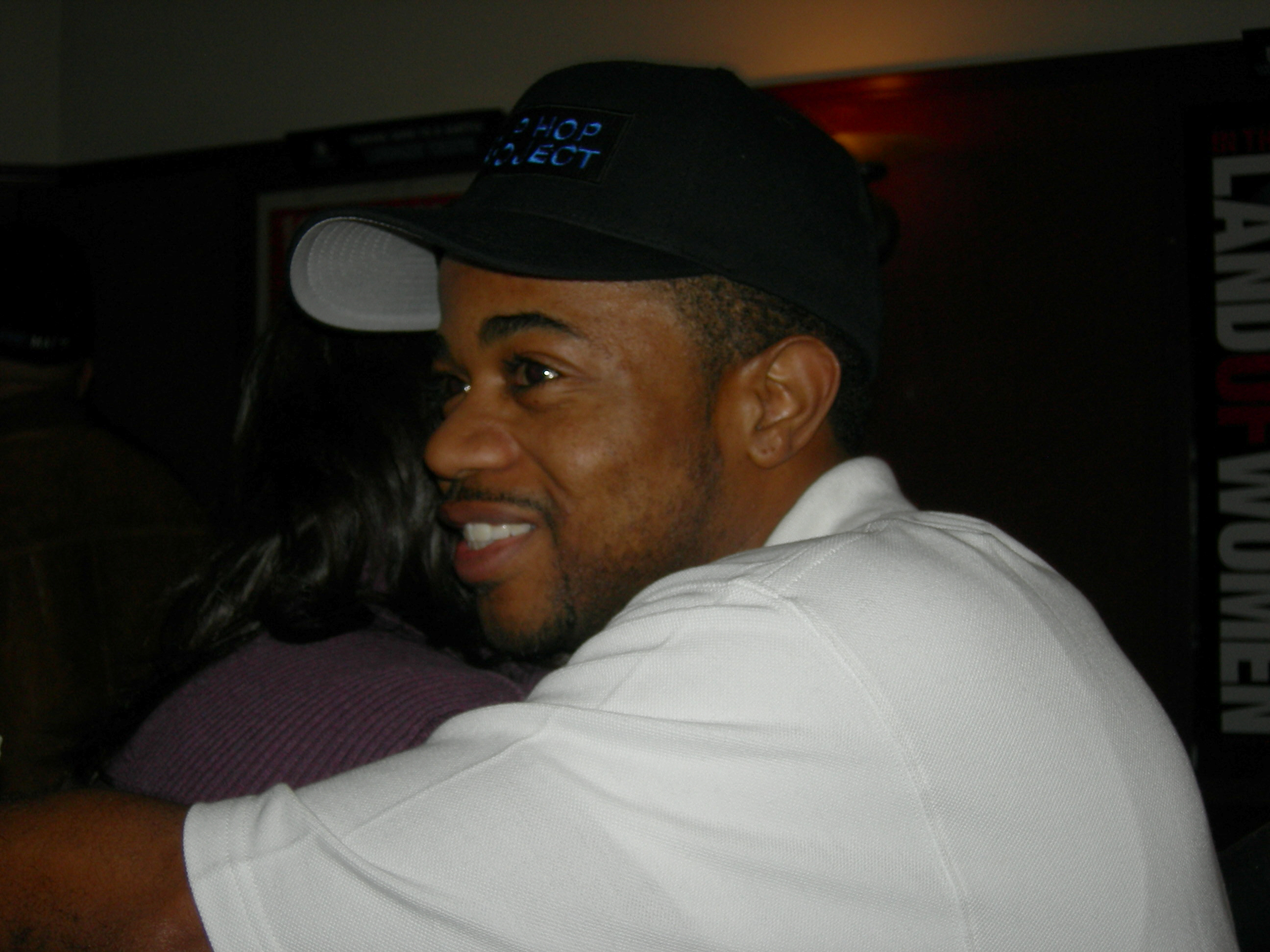
Chris "Kazi" Rolle, 2007

Chris Rolle, also known as "Kazi" (a shortened form of "Kharma Kazi"), is a community activist, rapper, and founder of a record company. Beginning as a teen, he has been involved in New York City's Art Start program. In 1999, he founded the Hip Hop Project. He is a subject in the film, The Hip Hop Project, which was produced by Bruce Willis and Queen Latifah. Since June 2004, he has been a member of Art Start's Board of Trustees. He is a motivational speaker on men's issues in the African American community. He is founder and co-CEO of One+One Records and a hip hop performer.

== Early life ==
He was born in Nassau, Bahamas; since 1990 he has lived in Brooklyn, New York City, United States. In 1994, while in high school, Rolle began an involvement with Art Start as a student in the Media Works Project. He graduated in 1996 from the New York City Public Repertory Company (an alternative arts high school), where he won the Playwrights Competition.

== Career ==
=== Art Start ===
In 1997, he taught the Media Works Project curriculum to teenagers coming out of Rikers Island prison, and in 1998 he led Art Start's anti-racism public service announcement (PSA) project, which received coverage from the Bravo cable network in the documentary Fire, Risk and Rhythm. Since June 2004, he has been a member of Art Start's Board of Trustees.

=== Hip Hop Project ===
Rolle founded the Hip Hop Project in 1999, with Art Start's support, and which led to collaboration with Russell Simmons and won him praise from people like Doug E. Fresh. According to Cassandra Lizaire, the project "has been encouraging impressionable young minds towards meaningful and positive musical messages ever since." He was a subject of the film, The Hip Hop Project in which Queen Latifah and Bruce Willis were the Executive Producers. It was filmed between 2001 and 2005, and was shown at the Brooklyn Museum of Art during "VH1 Hip Hop Honors Week" in 2006. The film debuted at the Tribeca Film Festival. He was with the project until September 2003. He was succeeded in his role at Art Start by one of his own students, Diana "Princess" Lemon.

=== A Brooklyn Story ===
He was director, actor, and writer for Tomorrow's Future theatre company; his work there included the play A Brooklyn Story.

=== Musical career ===
He founded One+One Records in September 2003. One of his good friends Nasir Jones, aka Nas, an American rapper who helped Rolles establish a career as the rapper, Kazi.

== Awards ==
His awards include a Governor's Citation, and the CBS Fulfilling the Dream Award for his play, A Brooklyn Story.
