= Planet Asia =

American rapper (born 1976)

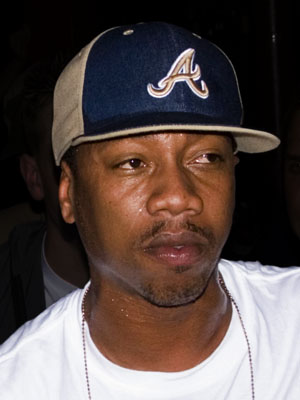
- Planet Asia in 2005

Background information
- Also known as: Planet Asia; King Medallions
- Born: Jason Green; October 24, 1976 (age 50); Fresno, California, U.S.
- Genre: Hip-hop
- Years active: 1996–present
- Labels: Interscope; Avatar; Gold Chain Music; Stones Throw; Wandering Worx; Brick; Battle Axe
- Formerly of: Cali Agents; Durag Dynasty; Gold Chain Military; Strong Arm Steady
- Website: therealplanetasia.com

Jason Green (born October 24, 1976), better known as Planet Asia, is an American rapper from Fresno, California. He is prominent for being one half of the hip-hop duo the Cali Agents and is also well known for his vast discography of mixtapes.

== Career ==
Originally from Fresno, California, Planet Asia moved to the San Francisco Bay Area in 1998 and began working with a local producer, Fanatik. Between 1997 and 2001, Planet Asia released several 12" singles, including "Definition of Ill" (Stones Throw) and "Place of Birth" (ABB Records). In 2000, he released the album How the West Was One with fellow rapper Rasco, under the group name Cali Agents. He earned acclaim in 2001 when The Source gave him the first round draft pick and Independent Album of the Year award, and he landed a deal with Interscope Records. He was nominated for a Grammy Award in 2002 for the song "W" by Mystic. While signed to Interscope Records, Planet Asia was not promoted much and stayed with Interscope until 2003 without releasing an album.

In 2003, Avatar Records signed Planet Asia and in 2004 released his debut album, The Grand Opening. It earned him another Independent Album of the Year award from The Source. Avatar also released 12" vinyl records including "Summertime In The City" b/w "G's & Soldiers" (featuring Kurupt), "Its All Big" b/w "Right or Wrong", and "Real Niggaz" (featuring Ghostface Killah). The song "G's & Soldiers" was in the 2005 film Be Cool.

After leaving Avatar, Planet Asia started his own record label, Gold Chain Music, with Walt Liquor. His next album, The Medicine, was released on October 3, 2006, on ABB and Battle Axe Records. The album was produced by Evidence of Dilated Peoples, with co-production from The Alchemist, Nucleus and Bravo. On June 26, 2007, he released The Jewelry Box Sessions: The Album on Gold Chain Music. In 2011, Planet Asia was a judge on the Ultimate MC TV show alongside Royce da 5'9", Sean Price, Organik, and Pharoahe Monch. In 2017, Planet Asia and Apollo Brown released a collaboration album titled Anchovies, followed by Sardines in 2023.

== Discography ==
=== Solo albums ===
- 1999: Still in Training
- 2004: The Grand Opening
- 2005: Jewelry Box Sessions: Part One (as King Medallions)
- 2006: The Medicine
- 2007: Jewelry Box Sessions: The Album (as Medallions)
- 2010: Crack Belt Theatre
- 2012: Black Belt Theatre
- 2016: Egyptian Merchandise
- 2017: Dirty Planet
- 2018: The Golden Buddha
- 2018: Mansa Musa
- 2019: Initials on my Jewelry
- 2020: Bodhidharma
- 2021: Block Shaman
- 2021: Holy Water
- 2021: Rule of Thirds
- 2026: Path of the Sword

=== Solo EPs ===
- 1998: Planet Asia
- 2000: The Last Stand
- 2011: The Bar Mitzvah
- 2014: Zapco Exp
- 2016: Asiatic Prince
- 2017: Velour Portraits
- 2019: Medallions
- 2019: AGE: All Gold Everything
- 2020: Arctic Plus Degrees: The Sun Don't Chill Allah

=== As Cali Agents ===
- 2000: How the West Was One (Ground Control)
- 2004: Head of the State (Pockets Linted/Groove Attack)
- 2006: Fire & Ice (Pockets Linted Entertainment)

=== Collaboration albums/EPs ===
- 1997: Representation (EP) - (with Skhoolyard)
- 2002: A New Way of Thinking (with Skhoolyard)
- 2006: Black Majik (as King Medallion) (with Arch Angel)
- 2008: Planet F.L.O. (with F.L.O.)
- 2008: Pain Language (with DJ Muggs)
- 2008: Pain Language: The Mixtape (with DJ Muggs)
- 2010: Chain of Command (with Gold Chain Military Crew)
- 2011: Camouflage Jackets (with G-Force)
- 2011: Cracks in the Vinyl (EP) (with Madlib)
- 2011: Each Step Becomes Elevated (with Tri-State as General Monks)
- 2012: Everyday Is Christmas (EP) (Gold Chain Music)
- 2012: Respeta at Santa Barbarie (EP) (with Superanfor)
- 2012: The Arrival (with Doo Wop)
- 2013: Abrasions (with Gensu Dean)
- 2013: The 2nd Coming (with Bronze Nazareth, Cappadonna, M-Eighty, Nino Grave & Canibus, as The Almighty)
- 2013: High End Cloths (EP) (with DirtyDiggs)
- 2013: 360 Waves (with Durag Dynasty)
- 2014: Via Satellite (with TzariZM)
- 2015: The Tonite Show: Starring Planet Asia (with DJ Fresh)
- 2015: 2010 A.D. (EP) (with Dirty Diggs)
- 2015: Nautica Nagas (with Dirty Diggs) feat. Eddie Brock
- 2016: Seventy Nine (with DJ Concept)
- 2017: Anchovies (with Apollo Brown)
- 2017: Unfinished & Untitled (with Copywrite)
- 2019: Blak Majic (with The Architect)
- 2019: Jackpot (with El Maryacho)
- 2019: The Planet Asia & Milano Constantine EP (with Milano Constantine)
- 2020: Yard to the Last Song (EP) (with Yard Massive)
- 2020: Trust the Chain (EP) (with 38 Spesh)
- 2020: Cashmere Corners (EP) (with A-Plus Tha Kid)
- 2020: Camo Jackets (with Calvin Valentine)
- 2020: Pharoah Chain (with The Musalini)
- 2021: No Exit Plans (EP) (with Phil A)
- 2022: Duffle Gods (EP) (with Scarr)
- 2022: Heist the Crown (EP) (with Body Bag Ben)
- 2022: U.z.i. Universal Zeitgeist Intelligence (with Snowgoons)
- 2023: Sardines (with Apollo Brown)
- 2024: Trust the Chain II (EP) (with 38 Spesh)

== Guest appearances ==
List of non-single guest appearances, with other performing artists, showing year released and album name
Title	Year	Other artist(s)	Album
"In Your Area"	1999	Peanut Butter Wolf	My Vinyl Weighs a Ton
"Madskillz-Mic Chekka"	1999	BT, Rasco	Movement in Still Life
"Ear Drums Pop (Remix)"	2000	Dilated Peoples	The Platform
"Listen"	2005	Littles, Khalid	Wu-Tang Meets the Indie Culture
"All The Way"	2006	Deep Rooted	The Second Coming
"A Moment In Time"	2007	Evidence	The Weatherman LP
"Longevity"	2001	DJ Fakts One, Rasco, Shakes Da Mayor	Long Range
"The Movement"	2009	The Jacka	Tear Gas
"4 All My N****s"	2009	Mistah F.A.B., Turf Talk, Ya Boy	Hyphy Ain't Dead
"Don't F*** Wit Them"	2010	J. Stalin, Philthy Rich	Early Morning Shift, Vol. 3
"Serious Rappin'"	2011	Termanology, Inspectah Deck	Cameo King II
"Sakura"	2012	Evidence	Step Brothers
"Gat In Your Mouth"	2012	Rasco	United Fakes of America
"Change Up"	2013	Lee Majors	G Slaps Radio Vol 4: Turkey Bags In My Louis Duffle
"Put on a Show (Tonite)"	2013	Mitchy Slick, The World's Freshest, Murs	Feet Match the Paint
"Fire"	2014	Hex One, 5th Element, Tek-nition	Hologramz
"Triple Beams"	2015	Apollo Brown, Westside Gunn	Grandeur
"Hold Us Down"	2015	E.D.I. Don, Translee	The Hope Dealer, Pt. 1
"Iceberg"	2017	Nicholas Craven	Craven N
"Ravioli"	2021	Switch	Save Yourself
"We Got Chu"	2021	Onyx	Onyx 4 Life
"Serpent's Tongue"	2025	Switch	
"Packinamac"	2026	Dope Sasquatch, Ren Thomas, Halfcut, Hex One, Tone Spliff, Sutter Kain	—N/a
