= Scratch Perverts =

UK musical group

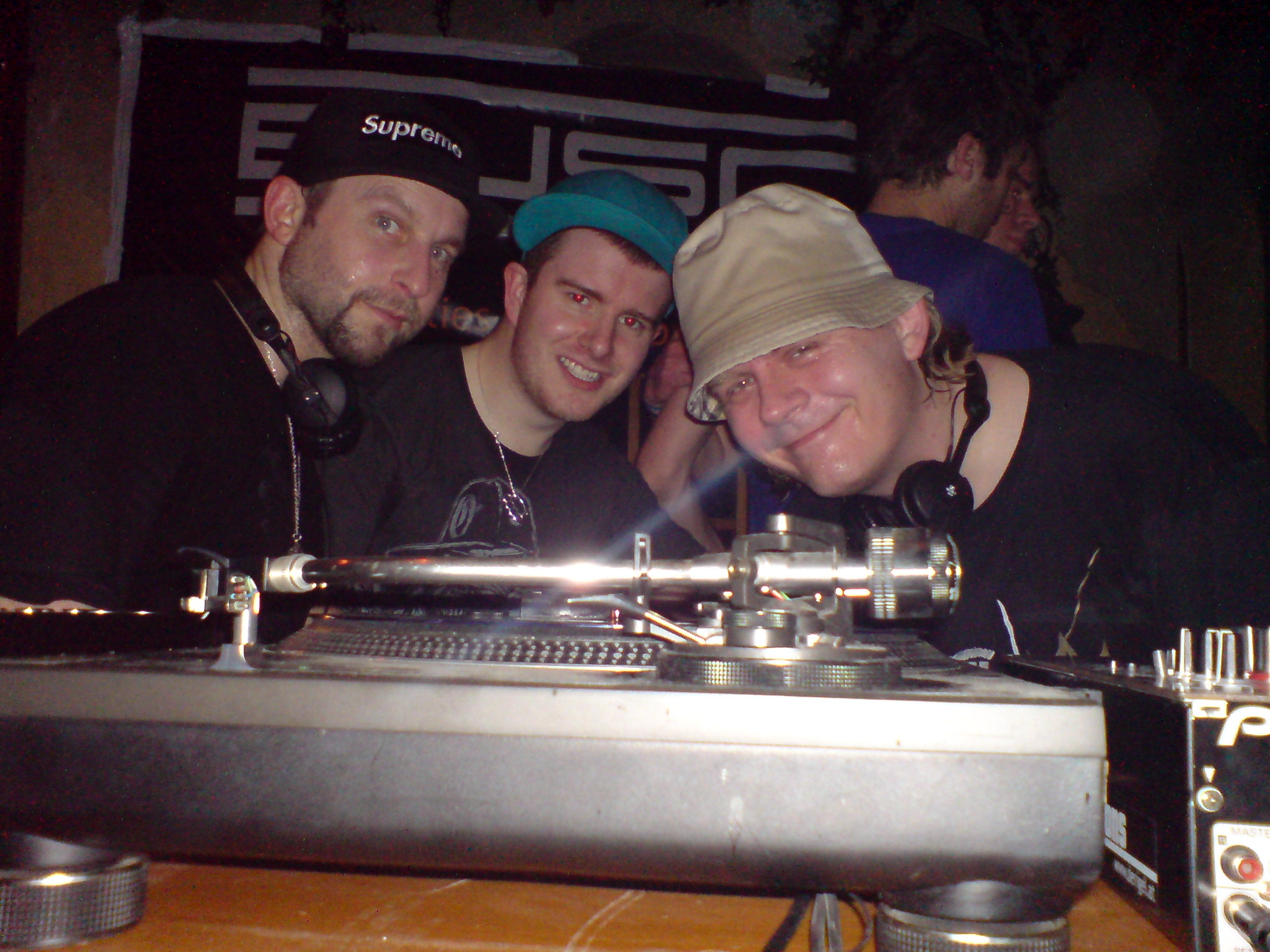
- Prime Cuts, Plus One and Tony Vegas at BUSC in April 2008

Background information
- Origin: London
- Genres: Electronica; drum and bass; hip hop
- Years active: 1996–present
- Members: Prime Cuts; Tony Vegas
- Past members: Plus One; Mr Thing; Harry Love; Killa Kela; Renegade; First Rate

The Scratch Perverts are a British turntablist DJs formed in 1996 by Tony Vegas, Prime Cuts and DJ Renegade.

World DMC team champions in both 1999 and 2001. Additionally Prime Cuts won 2 consecutive ITF World Scratching titles, first beating A-Trak in Hawaii in 1999 and then defending the title in Los Angeles the following year. Plus One won the Vestax battle in 2000, then the World DMC title in 2001. Their technical contributions include the 'feedback' technique, inspired by Jimi Hendrix.

They have now retired from competition and gone on to regular live DJing, touring and holding a residency at Fabric in London. They have also gone on to produce their own music.

== Harry Love ==
Harry Love is an English hip hop record producer and DJ from Laylow, Ladbroke Grove, London. He has produced beats for artists such as Jehst, Verb T, and Klashnekoff. He was a member of the Scratch Perverts in the 1990s.

== DJ Hero and DJ Hero 2 ==
The group were contributing artists in the Activision music game, DJ Hero, contributing a DJ setlist in the game which includes five tracks, and for the game's sequel which included two mixes from the group.

== Discography ==
=== Mix CDs ===
- B Boys Revenge - History In The Makin - X:treme Records (1998)
- Badmeaningood Vol.4 - Ultimate Dilemma (2003)
- FabricLive.22 - Fabric (2005)
- Fabric Big Issue CD (free with the Big Issue 24 September 2005)
- Watch The Ride - Harmless Records (2007)
- Beatdown - Fabric Records (2009)

=== Singles ===
- "Come Get It" with 'Time', Scratch Perverts Records (Limited edition Promotional copy) (25 October 2004)
- "Stand By", Supercharged Records (2007)

=== Featured in ===
- UNKLE vs. Scratch Perverts - The Breezeblock on BBC Radio 1, 2 January 1999
- DJ Hero
- Ed Rush & Optical - The Original Doctor Shade - Get Ill (feat. Scratch Perverts & MC Ryme Tyme), Mix-Cd, 2003
- DJ Hero 2

=== Mixes For DJ Hero ===
- Paper Planes By M.I.A. / Eric B. Is President By Eric B. & Rakim
- Beats and Pieces By Scratch Perverts
- Universal Mind Control (U.M.C.) By Common (rapper) / Jeep Ass Gutter (Aaron LaCrate & Debonair Samir RMX) By Masta Ace
- Robot Rock By Daft Punk / Al Naafyish (The Soul) By Hashim
- Groundhog (Beat Juggle) By Noisia

=== Mixes For DJ Hero 2 ===
- Omen By The Prodigy / The Box By Orbital
- Galvanize (Beat Juggle) By The Chemical Brothers Ft. Q-Tip
