= American Patriots Three Percent =

Right-wing American militia movement

American Patriots Three Percent, also known as AP3 or APIII, is a far-right American militia group that identifies itself as part of the Three Percenters movement.

The organization has used social media including Facebook as a recruiting tool. An information leak from a right-wing website in 2021 has led to the identification of many members from the organization.

Scot Seddon founded the organization during Barack Obama's first presidential term. Seddon used TikTok to recruit new members in July 2024 following the assassination attempt on Donald Trump.

== See also ==
- Three Percenters
