= Rasco =

American rapper

- Born: Keida M. Brewer; September 6, 1970 (age 55)
- Origin: Cleveland, Ohio
- Genres: Hip hop
- Years active: 1988–present
- Label: Pocketslinted Entertainment

Keida Brewer (born September 6, 1970), known professionally as Rasco (a bacronym for "Realistic, Ambitious, Serious, Cautious, and Organized"), is an American rapper.

Born in Cleveland, Ohio, Rasco became associated with hip hop in California. His first album was released on Stones Throw Records. He is also a member of the rap group Cali Agents with Planet Asia.

== Discography ==
=== Albums ===
- 1998 – Time Waits for No Man (Stones Throw Records)
- 1999 – The Birth EP (Copasetik)
- 2000 – How the West Was One (with Planet Asia as Cali Agents) (Ground Control)
- 2000 – 20,000 Leagues Under the Street, Vol. 1 (PocketsLinted)
- 2001 – Hostile Environment (Copasetik)
- 2003 – Escape from Alcatraz (PocketsLinted)
- 2003 – Presents Hip-Hop Classics, Vol. 1 (Copasetik)
- 2004 – Head of the State (with Planet Asia as Cali Agents) (PocketsLinted)
- 2004 – The Minority Report (PocketsLinted)
- 2005 – The Dick Swanson Theory (PocketsLinted) — producers include Style MiSia, Jake One, Oh No, Marco Polo, and DJ Therapy; includes "Making the Rounds" featuring Ras Kass, produced by Style MiSia
- 2006 – Fire & Ice (with Planet Asia as Cali Agents) (PocketsLinted)
- 2010 – Global Threat (PocketsLinted)
- 2010 – The Untouchables - Al Capone's Vault
- 2012 – United Fakes of America (PocketsLinted)
- 2013 – Swan & Simpson EP (with Guilty Simpson)
- 2014 – 7 Days EP (Pocketslinted)
- 2015 – The Replacement Killers (Rasco & Tristate)

=== Guest ===
- 1999 – BT – "Madskillz-Mic Chekka", "Smartbomb" and "Love on Haight Street"
- 2000 – Peter Gabriel – "The Story of OVO"
- 2002 – Linkin Park – "Ppr:Kut (Cheapshot & Jubacca featuring Rasco & Planet Asia)"
- 2003 – BT – "Knowledge Of Self", "Circles" and "The Revolution"
- 2007 – Hot in Pursuit feat. Rasco – "Raise the Bar"
- 2007 – Paulie Rhyme and Deedot – "Block 4 Block"
- 2010 – Smoky Mo feat. Rasco & Big D – "My People with Me"
- 2010 – Kid Pex feat. Rasco – "Art of War"
- 2013 – Antihelden feat. Rasco – "J. Rambo Flow"
- 2020 – Remo Conscious feat. Rasco & EBF - "Devil Didn’t Make Me"
