= Charizma =

American rapper (1973–1993)

- Peanut Butter Wolf (left) and Charizma (right)

Background information
- Born: Charles Edward Hicks Jr. July 6, 1973; San Jose, California, U.S.
- Origin: Milpitas, California, U.S.
- Died: December 16, 1993 (aged 20) East Palo Alto, California
- Genre: Hip hop
- Occupation: Rapper
- Years active: 1987–1993
- Labels: Hollywood Basic (1990–1993); Stones Throw Records (1996–present) (posthumous)

Charles Edward Hicks Jr. (July 6, 1973 – December 16, 1993), also known by his stage name Charizma, was an MC from Milpitas, California. He is best known for his work with Peanut Butter Wolf; the two artists formed a duo after meeting in 1990. Their musical partnership was cut short by Charizma's murder in December 1993.

== Biography ==
Charizma was 13 when he started rapping at high school talent shows. He was 16 when he met 19-year-old Chris Manak, also known as Peanut Butter Wolf, in 1990. They became best friends, recording several demos and performing live in the San Jose area. After hearing Charizma on San Jose State's KSJS 90.5 FM, Matt Brown approached Charizma and Peanut Butter Wolf, offering to become their manager. Charizma and Peanut Butter Wolf agreed and began looking for a record label. After entertaining offers from some major record labels, including Columbia Records, they signed with the Disney-owned record label Hollywood Basic, now Hollywood Records.

While signed to Hollywood Basic, Charizma and Peanut Butter Wolf recorded several tracks but Hollywood Basic did not release an album due to creative differences between the artists and the label. Charizma stated, "The stuff we wanted to do was not what Hollywood wanted. When we first got signed they kept asking us for more and more songs. After we got signed they were turning things down left and right. They were talking about bringing outside producers—but Pete Rock & CL Smooth never had outside producers, Gang Starr never did. It's like they almost liked the image [of us] more." Only a promotional cassette with the single "Red Light, Green Light" and a flexi disc with the single "Jack the Mack" that was featured in an issue of the Bay area hip hop zine Bomb Magazine were released while signed to Hollywood Basic.

Despite not having released an album, the duo gained a following. They routinely performed live in the Bay Area, toured Germany with label mates Raw Fusion and were featured in the Billboard magazine. They also opened for Nas and The Pharcyde, but the conflicts with Hollywood Basic's executives continued and they were released from their contract.

Charizma was shot dead in a mugging outside a church in East Palo Alto on December 16, 1993. While headed to pick up his mother, Charizma was sitting in his car at a stoplight in front of a church in East Palo Alto when a man approached his car and shot him once in the chest, killing him. The suspect was found later that day.

Peanut Butter Wolf retained the tracks recorded while signed to Hollywood Basic and after founding his own record label, Stones Throw Records, posthumously released an EP called M-Town and the full length Big Shots album in 2003, over 10 years after the tracks were originally recorded. Big Shots was well received by critics, reaching number 3 on CMJ's hip hop chart.

== Discography ==
=== Albums ===
Album information
M-Town EP
- Recorded: 1987–1989
- Released: November 18, 2003
- RIAA Certification: n/a
- Billboard 200 chart position: n/a
- R&B/Hip-Hop chart position: n/a
- Singles:
Big Shots (with Peanut Butter Wolf)
- Recorded: 1991–1993
- Released: November 18, 2003
- RIAA Certification: n/a
- Billboard 200 chart position: n/a
- R&B/Hip-Hop chart position: n/a
- Singles: "My World Premiere", "Devotion", "Here's A Smirk", "Jack The Mack"
Big Shots Bonus EP (with Peanut Butter Wolf)
- Recorded: 1991–1993
- Released: June 2004
- RIAA Certification: n/a
- Billboard 200 chart position: n/a
- R&B/Hip-Hop chart position: n/a
- Singles:

== See also ==
- List of murdered hip hop musicians
