= Cali Agents =

American hip-hop group

- Rasco and Planet Asia

Background information
- Also known as: Rasco & Planet Asia
- Origin: Fresno, California, U.S. San Mateo, California, U.S.
- Genres: Hip-hop
- Years active: 1999–2009, 2010-present
- Labels: Ground Control Records; Pocketslinted Entertainment
- Members: Rasco; Planet Asia

Cali Agents is an American hip-hop group, composed of California-based rappers Keida "Rasco" Brewer and Jason "Planet Asia" Green.

First appeared together on Rasco's Time Waits for No Man in 1998, the duo was billed as 'Cali Agents' on the 1999 single "Sophisticated Mic Pro's"/"Blood Brothaz" from Rasco's The Birth EP. They released their debut studio album How the West Was One in 2000, with its lead single "Good Life", which peaked at #36 on the Hot Rap Singles chart in the United States.

The group released their first compilation album Rasco & the Cali Agents Presents Hip Hop Classics Vol 1. in 2003, followed by releases of Head of the State (2004) and Fire & Ice (2006). In 2010, Seattle-based clothing company Iller Clothing released the duo's fourth project Close to Cash Pt.1.

== Discography ==
=== Albums ===
List of albums, with selected information
Title	Album details
How the West Was One	Release date: June 13, 2000; Label: Ground Control Records, Groove Attack Productions
Head of the State	Release date: March 9, 2004; Label: Pocketslinted Entertainment, Groove Attack Productions
Fire & Ice	Release date: November 7, 2006; Label: Pocketslinted Entertainment
Close to Cash Pt.1	Release date: November 23, 2010; Label: Iller Clothing Entertainment

=== Compilations ===
- 2003: Rasco & the Cali Agents Presents Hip Hop Classics Vol 1.
