= Peanut Butter Wolf =

American DJ and record producer from California

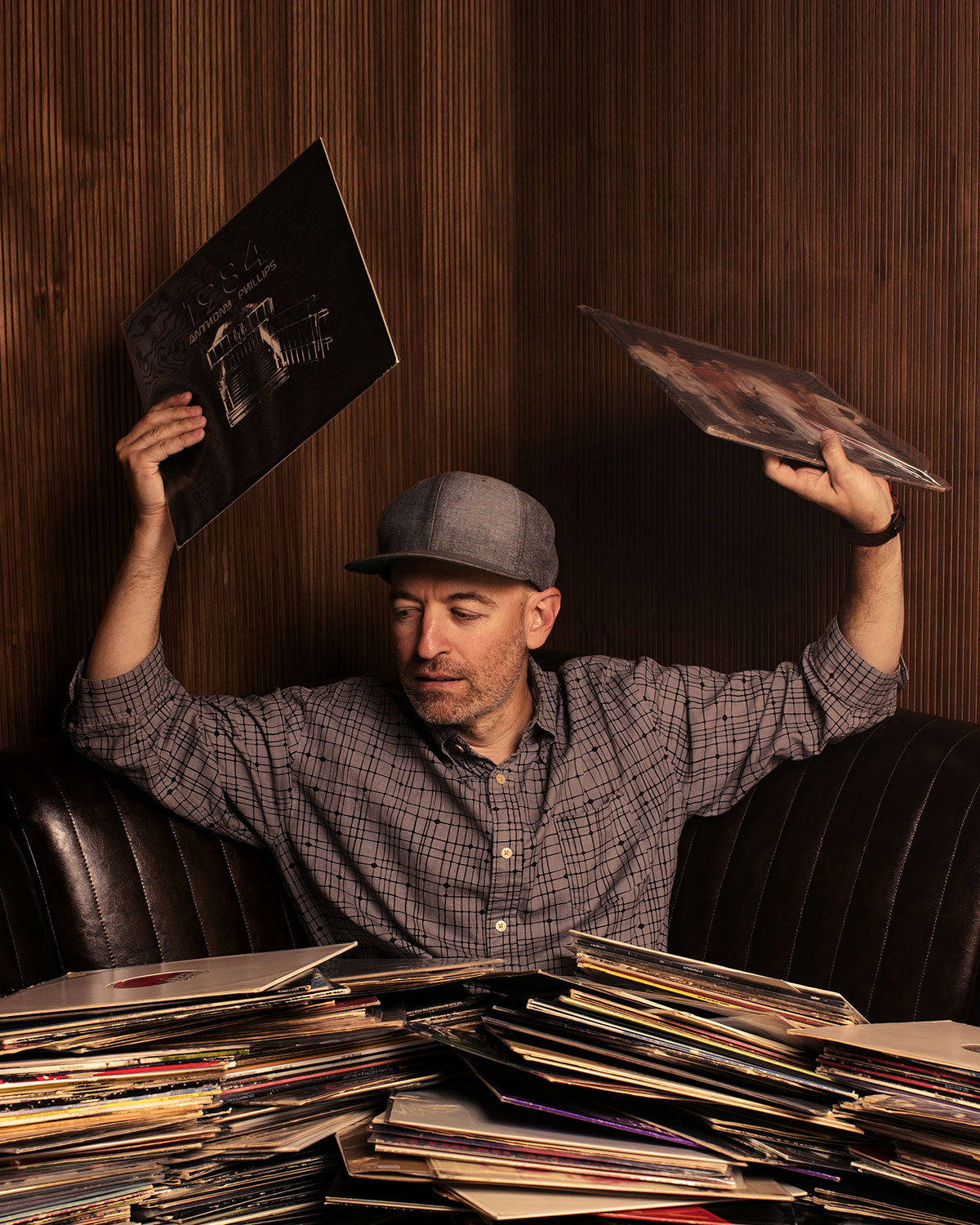
- Peanut Butter Wolf at his vinyl bar Gold Line in Los Angeles, California, photo by Robb Klassen

Background information
- Also known as: Chris Cut
- Born: Christopher George Manak; October 8, 1969 (age 56); San Jose, California, U.S.
- Genres: Hip hop
- Occupations: Disc jockey; record producer
- Instrument: Turntables
- Years active: 1989–present
- Labels: Heyday Records; Hollywood; Stones Throw; Ultimate Dilemma; Copasetik Recordings
- Website: www.stonesthrow.com

Christopher George Manak (born October 8, 1969), better known by his stage name Peanut Butter Wolf, is an American disc jockey and record producer from San Jose, California. He has been based in Los Angeles since 2000. He is the founder of Stones Throw Records.

== Career ==
In 1989, Peanut Butter Wolf met rapper Charizma. They became friends and started making music together. They made a name for themselves in San Jose and the Bay Area through their live shows and demo tapes. Charizma was shot dead in 1993. In 1996, Peanut Butter Wolf founded Stones Throw Records, which released the duo's Big Shots in 2003.

In 1999, Peanut Butter Wolf released My Vinyl Weighs a Ton. It peaked at number 44 on the UK Independent Albums Chart. In 2010, Jeff Weiss of Los Angeles Times called it "a crate-digging classic that remains one of the seminal statements of the underground golden era."

In 2024, he released an album with the Escondido-based multi-instrumentalist Brian Ellis, under the group name Campus Christy.

== Discography ==
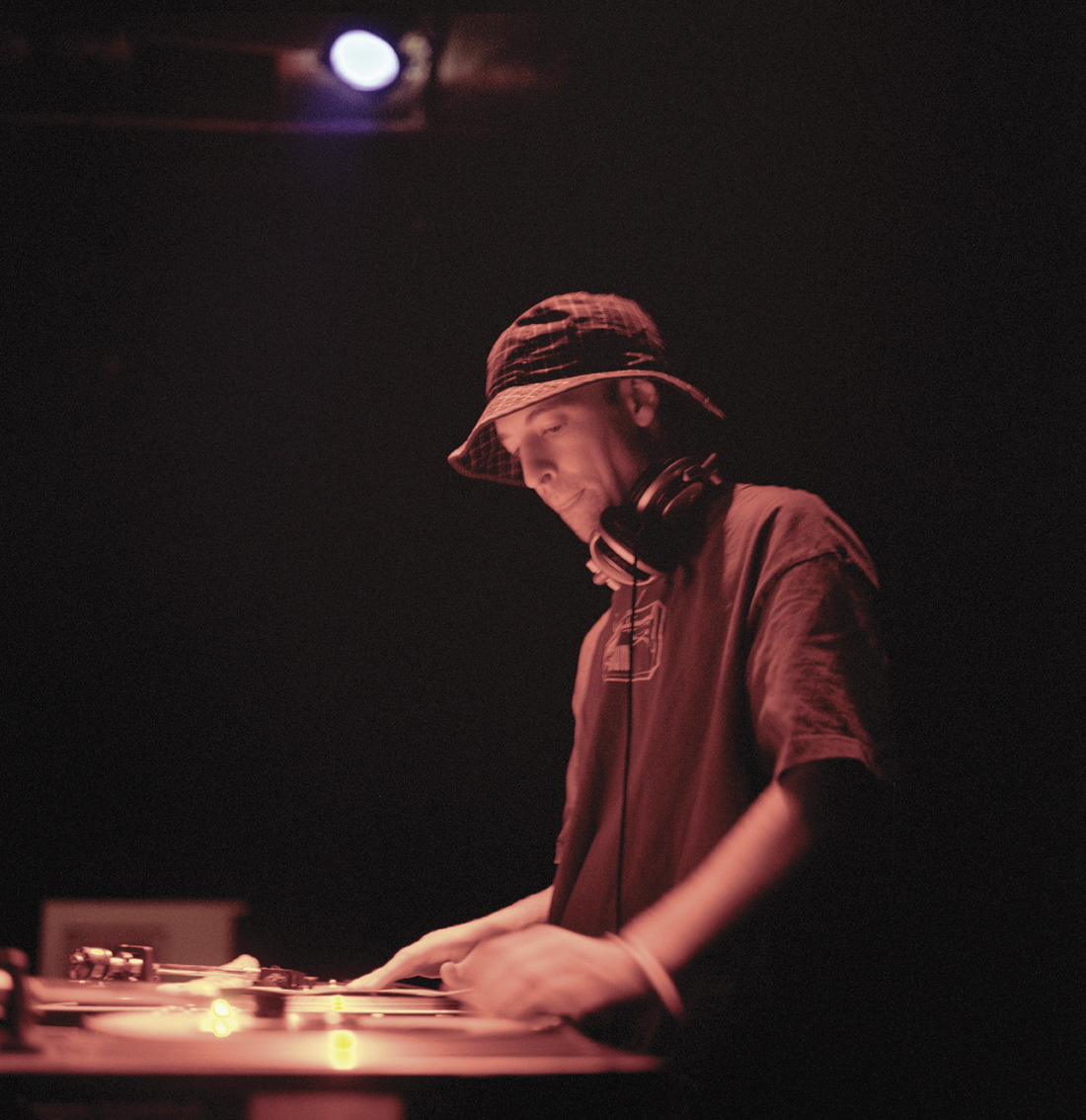
Peanut Butter Wolf in Cologne, Germany in 2003

=== Studio albums ===
- My Vinyl Weighs a Ton (1999)
- Big Shots (2003) (with Charizma)

=== Compilation albums ===
- Peanut Butter Breaks (1994)
- Peanut Butter Wolf's Jukebox 45's (2002)
- Chrome Children (2006)
- Chrome Children Vol. 2 (2007)
- B-Ball Zombie War (2007)
- Straight to Tape 1990-1992 (2009)
- Circa 1990-1993 (2014) (with Charizma)

=== Mixtapes ===
- Fusion Beats (2002)
- Badmeaningood Vol.3 (2003)
- 666 Mix (2006)
- Chrome Mix (2006)
- Zombie Playoffs (2007)
- Ladies First (2007)
- Be Our Valentine (2008) (with Prince Paul)

=== EPs ===
- Step on Our Ego's? (1996)
- Lunar Props (1996)
- Styles, Crews, Flows, Beats (1998)
- Big Shots Bonus EP (2004) (with Charizma)

=== Singles ===
- "My World Premiere" (1996) (with Charizma)
- "Run the Line" / "The Undercover (Clear & Present Danger)" (1997)
- "Definition of Ill" (1999)
- "Tale of Five Cities" (1999)
- "Devotion" (2000) (with Charizma)
- "Here's a Smirk" (2003) (with Charizma)
- "Jack the Mack" (2003) (with Charizma)
- "Melody" (2020) (with Sofie Royer and Miss World)

=== Guest appearances ===
- BT - "Love on Haight Street" from Movement in Still Life (1999)
- Deltron 3030 - "St. Catherine St." from Deltron 3030 (2000)
- Scuba Chicken- "Butane Fuel on da BBC" and "Voicemail" from Quantity Over Quality (2004)
- Scuba Chicken - "Stop Calling Me" from Let's Play Doctor (2006)

=== Productions ===
- Kool Keith - "Wanna Be a Star" (1996)
