= How the West Was One (Cali Agents album) =

Studio album by Cali Agents
- Released: June 13, 2000
- Studio: Darcman Studios (Oakland, CA)
- Genre: Hip-hop
- Length: 64:28
- Label: Nu Gruv Alliance; Ground Control
- Producer: Paul Nice; His-Panik; M-Boogie; Madlib; R'Kasha; Protest; Memo; 427; Roddy Rod

Cali Agents chronology
How the West Was One (2000)	Head of the State (2004)

Professional ratings
Review scores
Source	Rating
AllMusic	4/5 stars
The A.V. Club	(positive)
MVRemix	8/10
The Source	3/5 stars

How the West Was One is the debut album by the rap duo Cali Agents. It was released in 2000 via Nu Gruv Alliance and Ground Control. It contained production from Paul Nice, His-Panik, M-Boogie, Madlib, R'Kasha, Protest, Memo, 427 and Roddy Rod. The album did not make it to any Billboard charts, but a single titled "Good Life" made it to No. 36 on the Hot Rap Singles.

The Source listed the album as one of the top six independent records of 2000. The album has sold over 50,000 copies without any major distribution.

In May 2004, Rasco's Pockets Linted records re-released the album with bonus tracks.

== Critical reception ==
The A.V. Club wrote: "How The West Was One is an endless battle-rap session that serves as little more than a thorough assertion of the duo's lyrical dominance. Thankfully, Rasco and Planet Asia are battle-rappers of the highest order, excelling in nearly every aspect of rapping other than lyrical diversity." Exclaim! thought that "the focus on slinging hard-hitting verbals means that the sum is ultimately less than its parts, preventing this fundamentally sound collaboration from being great." CMJ New Music Monthly stated that the duo "swims in uninspiring four-track production."

== Track listing ==
#	Title	Length	Producer	Performer(s)
1	"Intro: Behind Closed Doors"	2:33		
2	"How The West Was One"	4:14	DJ Paul Nice	Rasco, Planet Asia
3	"Cali Agents: The Anthem"	3:18	His-Panik	Rasco, Planet Asia
4	"Crash The Boards"	4:34	M-Boogie	Rasco, Planet Asia
5	"Up Close and Personal"	4:31	Madlib	Rasco, Planet Asia
6	"Neva Forget"	3:46	His-Panik	Rasco, Planet Asia
7	"Interlude"	1:05		
8	"This Is My Life"	3:36	His-Panik	Rasco, Planet Asia
9	"Faces of Death"	4:27	R'Kasha	Planet Asia
10	"The Good Life"	5:25	Protest	Rasco, Planet Asia
11	"Just When You Thought It Was Safe"	4:17	Memo	Rasco, Planet Asia
12	"Talking Smack"	4:51	427	Rasco
13	"Real Talk"	4:12	Protest	Rasco, Planet Asia
14	"Fuck What You Heard"	4:44	Roddy Rod	Rasco, Planet Asia
15	"Outro"	0:45	Bill Baren	

== Bonus tracks ==
on 2004 release

#	Title	Performer(s)
1	"Point Blank Range"	Rasco, Planet Asia
2	"Who Thinks The Style Is Fresh"	Rasco, Planet Asia
