= Madlib production discography =

The following list is a partial discography of production by Madlib, an American hip hop record producer and recording artist from Oxnard, California. It includes a list of songs produced, co-produced and remixed by year, artist, album and title.

== Albums produced ==
Albums entirely produced or co-produced by Madlib
Album	Year	Artist
Soundpieces: Da Antidote	1999	Lootpack
Illmindmuzik	1999	Declaime
The Unseen	2000	Quasimoto
Down for the Kaz	2000	Kaz
Angles Without Edges	2001	Yesterdays New Quintet
Shades of Blue: Madlib Invades Blue Note	2003	Madlib
A Lil' Light	2003	Dudley Perkins
Madvillainy	2004	Madvillain
Stevie	2004	Yesterdays New Quintet
A Tribute to Brother Weldon	2004	Monk Hughes & The Outer Realm
The Lost Tapes	2004	Lootpack
Theme for a Broken Soul	2004	DJ Rels
The Further Adventures of Lord Quas	2005	Quasimoto
The Funky Side of Life	2005	Sound Directions
Expressions (2012 A.U.)	2006	Dudley Perkins
Liberation	2007	Talib Kweli and Madlib
Yesterdays Universe	2007	Yesterdays New Quintet
Perseverance	2007	Percee P
Sujinho	2008	Jackson Conti
Madvillainy 2: The Madlib Remix	2008	Madvillain
WLIB AM: King of the Wigflip	2008	Madlib
In Search of Stoney Jackson	2010	Strong Arm Steady
Miles Away	2010	The Last Electro-Acoustic Space Jazz & Percussion Ensemble
Slave Riot	2010	Young Jazz Rebels
O.J. Simpson	2010	Guilty Simpson
Seeds	2012	Georgia Anne Muldrow
Yessir Whatever	2013	Quasimoto
Piñata	2014	Freddie Gibbs and Madlib
Bad Neighbor	2015	M.E.D, Blu and Madlib
The Turn Up	2017	M.E.D, Blu and Madlib
Bandana	2019	Freddie Gibbs and Madlib
The Professionals	2020	The Professionals
Sound Ancestors	2021	Madlib
No Fear of Time	2022	Black Star
Liberation 2	2023	Talib Kweli and Madlib

== 1992 ==
=== No Good Hoodz – Throw 'Em Up / Click Click Bang Bang ===
- A1. "Throw 'Em Up"
- A2. "Click Click Bang Bang"
- A3. "Throw 'Em Up (Remix) (Produced with Kan Kick)

== 1993 ==
=== Tha Alkaholiks – 21 and Over ===
(Tracks produced with Tha Alkaholiks)

- 5. "Turn tha Party Out" (featuring Lootpack)
- 9. "Mary Jane"

== 1995 ==
=== Tha Alkaholiks – Coast II Coast ===
- 1. "WLIX" (featuring Lootpack and Declaime) {produced with Tha Alkaholiks}

== 1996 ==
=== OGC – Da Storm ===
- 15. "Flappin'" {produced with E-Swift}

=== Lootpack – Psyche Move EP ===
- 1. "Psyche Move (Original Mix)"
- 2. "Psyche Move (Matrix Mix)
- 3. "Attack of the Tupperware Puppets" (featuring The Crate Diggers Sextet)
- 4. "Female Request Line"

== 1997 ==
=== Tha Alkaholiks – Likwidation ===
- 5. "Tore Down" (featuring Lootpack)
- 7. "Killin' It" (featuring Xzibit)

== 1999 ==
=== Zion I – Critical / Venus VLS ===
- A3. "Critical (Madlib Remix)"

=== Quasimoto – Hittin' Hooks EP ===
- 1. "Hittin' Hooks"
- 2. "Microphone Mathematics (Remix)

=== Lootpack – The Anthem (Madlib Remix) ===
- 1. "The Anthem (Madlib Remix) [Vocal]"

=== Peanut Butter Wolf – Definition of Ill EP ===
- 3. "Definition of Ill (Remix Vocal)"

== 2000 ==
=== Slum Village – Best Kept Secret ===
- 8. "Get It Together" (Madlib Remix)
- 9. "The Things You Do" (Madlib Remix)

=== Cali Agents – How the West Was One ===
- 5. "Up Close and Personal"

=== Various Artists – Lyricist Lounge 2 ===
- 13. "Da Cipha Interlude" (performed by Punchline, Cobra Red, Planet Asia, Consequence, Menace and Phil the Agony)

== 2001 ==
=== Declaime – Andsoitisaid ===
- 1. "Intro"
- 2. Move It
- 3. Oxnardbangbreak
- 5. Magicalmuzikbreak
- 6. The Movement (featuring Lootpack)
- 7. Sickman Skit
- 8. Asylum Walk
- 10. Get'em Skit
- 12. Kizumsihtrofdogknaht
- 14. Cheebaskit
- 17. Andsoitisaid
- 18. Beatconductasinsai
- 19. Don't Trip (featuring Quasimoto)
- 20. Muzikillmind
- 21. 2MC Or Not 2MC
- 22. Bumptybumplebildamludeotis
- 24. Spybreak
- 25. Reasons
- 26. Unuthafatassdrumple
- 28. Dayzend
- 29. Last Days and Times
- 30. Outro

== 2003 ==
=== Zero 7 – Simple Things Remixes ===
- 4. "Distractions (Madlib's YNQ Remix)"

=== Wildchild – Secondary Protocol ===
- 1. "Intro"
- 3. "Hands Up"
- 6. "Heartbeat" (featuring Oh No)
- 8. "Secondary Protocol"
- 9. "Knicknack 2002" (featuring Medaphoar and Percee P)
- 11. "Bounce" (featuring Aceyalone, Planet Asia, and Spontaneous)
- 13. "Party Up" (featuring Vinia Mojica)
- 14. "Operation Radio Raid" (featuring LMNO)
- 15. "Feel It" (featuring Medaphoar)

=== Jaylib – Champion Sound ===
- 1. "L.A. to Detroit" (produced with J Dilla)
- 2. "McNasty Filth" (featuring Frank-N-Dank)
- 4. "Champion Sound"
- 6. "Heavy"
- 8. "The Official"
- 10. "The Mission"
- 12. "Strapped" (featuring Guilty Simpson)
- 15. "Survival Test"
- 17. "No Games"
- 19. "Ice"

=== Diverse – One A.M. ===
- 4. "Ain't Right"

== 2004 ==
=== Various artists – Blue Note Revisited ===
- 7. "Young Warrior" [Madlib Remix of Bobbi Humphrey]

=== Vast Aire – Look Mom... No Hands ===
- 11. "Look Mom... No Hands / A.S.C.F.D."
- 14. "Could You Be?"
- 16. "Life's Ill Pt. II (The Empire Striketh)" (featuring Breezly Brewin and Vordul)

=== Prince Po – The Slickness ===
- 2. "Too Much"
- 7. "The Slickness"
- 9. "Bump Bump" (featuring Raekwon)

=== De La Soul – The Grind Date ===
- 4. "Shopping Bags (She Got from You)" (featuring Daniel Wallace)
- 10. "Come on Down" (featuring Flava Flav)

=== Oh No – The Disrupt ===
- 2. "Right Now"
- 5. "Stomp That, V. 2" (featuring Wildchild)
- 11. "Every Section" (featuring Cornbread)
- 13. "My Aggin"
- 16. "Chosen One"

=== Declaime – Conversations with Dudley ===
- 13. "Signs" (featuring Wildchild)
- 14. "Enjoy Your Stay"
- 15. "Life"

=== M.F. Doom – MM..FOOD ===
- 4. "One Beer"
- 0. "One Beer (Madlib Remix)

=== The Free Design – The Now Sound Redesigned ===
- 2. "Where Do I Go" (Madlib Remix)

== 2005 ==
=== Lawless Element – Soundvision: In Stereo ===
- 9. "High"

=== Living Legends – Classic ===
- 3. "Blast Your Radio"

=== Dwight Trible & The Life Force Trio – Love Is The Answer ===
- 5. "Waves of Infinity Harmony" (co-produced with Carlos Niño and Daedelus)

== 2006 ==
=== Danger Doom – Occult Hymn ===
- 7. "Space Ho's" (Madlib Remix)

=== Prince Po – Prettyblack ===
- 3. "Mecheti Lightspeed"

=== J Dilla – The Shining ===
- 5. "Baby" (featuring Madlib and Guilty Simpson) {produced with J Dilla}

=== Visionaries – We Are The Ones (We Have Been Waiting For) ===
- 13. "Need to Learn" (featuring Rakaa Iriscience, Brother J, YZ, RBX, and Sadat X)

=== Subtitle – Terrain to Roam ===
- 1. "H.H. Jesus"
- 15. "H.H. Lucifer"

=== AG – Get Dirty Radio ===
- 1. "Frozen"
- 3. "Take a Ride" (featuring Party Arty and Aloe Blacc)

=== Ghostface Killah – More Fish ===
- 7. "Block Rock"

== 2007 ==
=== Planet Asia – Jewelry Box Sessions: The Album ===
- 7. "Master Builder" (featuring Flii Stylz)

=== Skyzoo – Corner Store Classic ===
- 8. "Close Reach" (featuring Nina B)

=== Talib Kweli – Eardrum ===
- 1. "Everything Man" (featuring Res)
- 7. "Eat to Live"
- 9. "Soon the New Day" (featuring Norah Jones) {produced with Eric Krasno}

=== Strong Arm Steady – Deep Hearted ===
- 6. "Clean Up" (featuring Black Thought and Saukrates)

=== Wildchild – Jack of All Trades ===
- 3. "Puppet Masters" (featuring Prince Po)
- 9. "The League" (featuring Special Ed, Masta Ace, Percee P, and MC Lyte)
- 14. "Eyes Wide Shut" (featuring Oh No and MED)

=== Guilty Simpson – Stray Bullets ===
- 1. "The Future"

== 2008 ==
=== Erykah Badu – New Amerykah Part One (4th World War) ===
- 2. "The Healer"
- 4. "My People"
- 11. "Real Thang"

=== Guilty Simpson – Ode to the Ghetto ===
- 1. "The American Dream"
- 3. "She Won't Stay at Home"
- 8. "The Future" (featuring MED)
- 9. "Pigs"
- 13. "Yikes"

== 2009 ==
=== Mos Def – The Ecstatic ===
- 3. "Auditorium" (featuring Slick Rick) {produced with Mos Def}
- 4. "Wahid"
- 11. "Pretty Dancer"
- 13. "Revelations"

=== MF Doom – Born Like This ===
- 5. "Absolutely"

=== Slum Village – Villa Manifesto EP ===
- 4. "Money Right"

== 2010 ==
=== Erykah Badu – New Amerykah Part Two (Return of the Ankh) ===
- 6. "Umm Hmm" {produced with Erykah Badu}
- 10. "Incense" (featuring Kirsten Agresta)

=== Das Racist – Shut Up, Dude ===
- 16. "Deep Ass Shit (You'll Get It When You're High)" {produced with MF Doom}

=== Vinnie Paz – Season of the Assassin ===
- 10. "Aristotle’s Dilemma"

== 2011 ==
=== Strong Arm Steady – Arms and Hammers ===
- 11. "Cheeba Cheeba (Part 2)"

=== Red Hot AIDS Benefit Series – Red Hot + Rio 2 ===
- B5. "Banana" (Joyce Moreno featuring Generation Match)

=== Blu – j e s u s ===
- 10. "jesus"

=== M.E.D. – Classic ===
- 3. "Too Late"
- 6. "Get That" (featuring POK)
- 7. "JWF"
- 8. "Roll Out" (featuring Kurupt and Planet Asia)
- 9. "Blaxican"
- 10. "Outta Control" (featuring Hodgy)
- 11. "Flying High"
- 12. "Medical Card"
- 13. "1 Life 2 Live"
- 14. "Mystical Magic"

== 2012 ==
=== Capital Steez – AmeriKKKan Korruption ===
- 1. "Capital STEEZ"

=== Captain Murphy – Du∆lity ===
- 6. "Children of the Atom" {produced with Flying Lotus}

== 2013 ==
=== MED, Blu and Madlib – The Burgundy ===
- "Burgundy Whip"
- "The Arrangement"
- "Belly Full"

=== Blu – York ===
- 14. "Jazzmen"
- 15. "Ronald Morgan" (featuring Edan)

=== Roc Marciano – The Pimpire Strikes Back ===
- 2. "The Sacrifice"

=== Dudley Perkins – Dr. Stokley ===
- 11. "State of Emergency"

== 2014 ==
=== Snoop Dogg – That's My Work Volume 3 ===
- 10. "Cadillacs"

== 2015 ==
=== Various Artists – Buck: Original Book Soundtrack ===
- 5. "Blank Page" – MK Asante

=== Ransom – Soul Killa ===
- 11. "Knicks" (featuring Action Bronson, Freddie Gibbs, and Joey Bada$$)

=== Wiki – Lil Me ===
- 1. "WikiFlag"

== 2016 ==
=== Anderson Paak – Malibu ===
- 3. "The Waters" (featuring BJ the Chicago Kid)

=== Kanye West – The Life of Pablo ===
- 17. "No More Parties in LA" (featuring Kendrick Lamar)

=== J Dilla – The Diary ===
- 5. "The Shining, Pt. 2 (Ice)"
- 15. "The Sickness" (featuring Nas)

== 2017 ==
=== Mach-Hommy and Tha God Fahim – Dollar Menu 3: Dump Gawd Edition ===
- 12. "Sous Vide"

== 2019 ==
=== MED and Guilty Simpson – Child of the Jungle ===
- 1. "Mad"

=== Westside Gunn – Flygod Is an Awesome God ===
Source:'

- 5. "Ferragamo Funeral"
- 11. "Gunnlib"

== 2020 ==
=== Hus Kingpin and Roc 'C' – The Hidden Painting ===
- 3. "Scrimmage" (featuring Fashawn)
- 6. "Crush"

=== Pink Siifu and Fly Anakin – FlySiifu's ===
- 18. "Time Up"

== 2021 ==
=== Westside Gunn – Hitler Wears Hermes 8: Side B ===
- 5. "Richies"

== 2022 ==
=== Fly Anakin – Frank ===
- 11. "No Dough"

=== Wildchild – Omowale ===
- 2. "Manifestin" (featuring Angelo Arce)

=== Fatlip and Blu – Live From the End of the World, Vol. 1 (Demos) ===
- 4. "Gangsta Rap"

=== Westside Gunn, Stove God Cooks, and Estee Nack – Peace "Fly" God ===
- 6. "Derrick Boleman"
- 7. "Horses on Sunset"
- 8. "Open Praise"

=== Your Old Droog and Madlib – The Return of Sasquatch ===
- 1. "The Return of Sasquatch"

=== Sonnyjim and The Purist – White Girl Wasted ===
- 5. "Does Mushrooms Once"

=== Freddie Gibbs – $oul $old $eparately ===
- 14. "CIA"

=== Mr. Muthafuckin' eXquire – I Love Y.O.U Cuz Y.O.U Ugly Vol. 1 ===
- 4. "Bubbleguts"
- 10. "The Weight of Water Part 2"

=== Open Mike Eagle – Component System with the Auto Reverse ===
- 5. "Circuit City" (featuring Video Dave and Still Rift)

=== Loyle Carner – Hugo ===
- 3. "Georgetown" (featuring John Agard)

=== Your Old Droog – The Yodfather ===
- 5. "Droogie-La"

== 2023 ==
=== Your Old Droog – Pronouns ===
- 1. "Pronouns"

=== Meyham Lauren – Champagne for Breakfast ===
- 4. "Midnight Silk"
- 5. "Sunday Driving"
- 7. "Evolution"
- 10. "Pop Clink Fizz"
- 12. "African Pompano"
- 13. "Triple M Airlines"
- 15. "Wild Salmon"

=== Your Old Droog – Foie Gras ===
- 1. "Foie Gras"

=== Tyler, The Creator – CALL ME IF YOU GET LOST: The Estate Sale ===
- 19. "What a Day"

=== Your Old Droog – Waves Crashing ===
- 1. "Waves Crashing"

== 2024 ==
=== Your Old Droog - Movies ===
- 15. "D.B.Z." (featuring Method Man & Denzel Curry)
- 19. "Care Plan" (featuring Yasiin Bey)

=== Hus Kingpin - Slime Wave 2 ===
- 3. "Rio de Dinheiro" (featuring Mala No Judas)

=== Lord Apex- The Good Fight ===
- 1. "The Good Fight"

== 2025 ==
=== Akil The MC - Taxes EP ===
- 1. "Tax Deducation"
- 2. "Tax Exempt"
- 3. "Tax Return"

=== Stacy Epps - FLOWHEART ===
- 4. "EVER"
- 8. "FEELS LIKE" (featuring Believe)

== 2026 ==
=== Chris Crack - Too Late To Start Following The Rules Now ===
- 12. "Hurt Feelings Over Wasted Time"

=== .idk. - e.t.d.s.: A Mixtape by .idk. ===
- 3. "DEViL" (co-produced with .idk. and Eden Nagar, additional production by Calvin Valentine and Acyde)
- 12. "MiSOGYNISTICAL" (co-produced with .idk.)
