= Peanut Butter Wolf Presents Stones Throw: Ten Years =

Compilation album by Various artists
- Released: January 23, 2007
- Genre: Hip hop
- Label: Stones Throw Records
- Producers: Madlib; Peanut Butter Wolf; J Dilla; Cut Chemist; L.A. Carnival; Ira Raibon; Genie Jackson; Koushik; Aloe Blacc; G-Luv; Gary Wilson; Monty Stark; Mr. Magic; Edan; Jeff Jank

Various artists chronology
Chrome Children Vol. 2 (2006)	Peanut Butter Wolf Presents Stones Throw: Ten Years (2007)	Hella International (2007)

Peanut Butter Wolf Presents Stones Throw: Ten Years is a compilation album released by Stones Throw Records. The album celebrates the founding of Stones Throw ten years earlier. Many songs were taken from past Stones Throw releases to demonstrate growth over the 10-year period; however, some of this album's tracks had not been previously released. On January 23, 2007, this album was re-issued as 2 CDs featuring the 2nd disc as a mix CD by J-Rocc of the Beat Junkies.

== Track listing ==
1. "The Red"
  - Performed by Jaylib
  - Produced by J Dilla
2. "In Your Area"
  - Performed by Peanut Butter Wolf
  - Featuring Planet Asia
  - Produced by Peanut Butter Wolf
3. "Low Class Conspiracy"
  - Performed by Quasimoto
  - Produced by Madlib
4. "America's Most Blunted"
  - Performed by Madvillain
  - Produced by Madlib
5. "Two Can Win"
  - Performed by J Dilla
  - Produced by J Dilla
6. "Knicknack"
  - Performed by Wildchild
  - Featuring Percee P, M.E.D.
  - Produced by Madlib
7. "Blind Man [L.A. Carnival Remix]"
  - Performed by M.E.D., Cut Chemist
  - Produced by Cut Chemist
  - Remix produced by L.A. Carnival
8. "Take Me"
  - Performed by Fabulous Souls featuring Ira Raibon and Alicia Coates
  - Produced by Ira Raibon
9. "What About You? [Alternative Version]"
  - Performed by Co Real Artists
  - Produced by Genie Jackson
10. "My World Premiere [12" Single Version]"
  - Performed by Charizma, Peanut Butter Wolf
  - Produced by Peanut Butter Wolf
11. "Bang Ya Head"
  - Performed by M.E.D.
  - Produced by Madlib
12. "Move, Pt. 2"
  - Performed by Oh No, Roc 'C', J Dilla
  - Produced by J Dilla
13. "The Payback"
  - Performed by Madlib
  - Produced by Madlib
14. "Falling"
  - Performed by Dudley Perkins
  - Produced by Madlib
15. "A.V.E.R.A.G.E."
  - Performed by Kazi
  - Produced by Madlib
16. "Be With"
  - Performed by Koushik
  - Produced by Koushik
17. "Sunrays"
  - Performed by Yesterdays New Quintet
  - Produced by Madlib
18. "Arrive"
  - Performed by Aloe Blacc
  - Produced by Aloe Blacc
19. "Figaro [Madlib Remix]"
  - Performed by Madvillain
  - Produced by Madlib
  - Remix produced by Madlib
20. "Survivin' The Game"
  - Performed by Homeliss Derelix
  - Produced by G-Luv
21. "Whenimondamic"
  - Performed by Lootpack
  - Produced by Madlib
22. "Gary's In The Park"
  - Performed by Gary Wilson
  - Produced by Gary Wilson
23. "Comrades & Dreams [Peanut Butter Wolf Mix]"
  - Performed by Stark Reality
  - Produced by Monty Stark
  - Remix produced by Peanut Butter Wolf
24. "Coast To Coast [Edan Edit]"
  - Performed by Mr. Magic
  - Produced by Mr. Magic
  - Remix produced by Edan
25. "Bootay"
  - Performed by Funkaho
  - Produced by Jeff Jank

== Credits ==
- Executive producer: Peanut Butter Wolf
