= Mind Fusion =

Remix album series by Madlib

Mind Fusion is a 5-volume series of albums produced by Madlib.

== Volume 1 ==
Mind Fusion Vol. 1

Mixtape by Madlib
- Released: 2004
- Recorded: 2003–2004
- Genre: Hip hop, remix
- Label: Mind Fusion Records
- Producer: Madlib

Madlib chronology
Mind Fusion Vol. 1 (2004)	Mind Fusion Vol. 2 (2004)

Mind Fusion Vol. 1 is the first of the Mind Fusion series of mixtapes and remixes by West Coast hip hop producer Madlib. As every mixtape follows a different genre of music, the first in the series focuses on hip hop songs produced and remixed by Madlib. It was released in CD format independently on Madlib's Mind Fusion imprint. It also features vocals from fellow Stones Throw artists.

=== Track list ===
All tracks are produced, remixed, and arranged by Madlib.

1. "Mind Fusions (Intro)"
2. "All Night" (featuring Wildchild, Declaime and MED)
3. "The Omen (Madlib Remix)" (featuring Aim)
4. "I Got A Right Ta (Madlib Remix)" (featuring Common)
5. "Money Folder (12-inch Remix)" (featuring Madvillain)
6. "Never Saw It Coming" (from Push Comes to Shove) - (featuring MED)
7. "Galt Suite No. 7"
8. "Uh Huh (Madlib Remix)" (featuring Method Man)
9. "Stomp the Shit Out You (Madlib Remix)" (featuring M.O.P.)
10. "Steal This Beat (Instrumental)"
11. "Yo’ Soul" (featuring Dudley Perkins)
12. "Hydrant Game" (from The Further Adventures of Lord Quas) - (featuring Quasimoto)
13. "Ain’t Right" (featuring Diverse)
14. "Who You Be? (Madlib Remix)" (featuring Outsidaz)
15. "Beer Games" (featuring Madvillain and Jaylib)
16. "Feel It" (from Secondary Protocol) - (featuring Wildchild)
17. "The Payback (Gotta)" (from Beat Konducta Vol 1–2: Movie Scenes)
18. "WTF (Madlib Remix)" (featuring Oh No and Wildchild)
19. "Montara (Remix)" (featuring Bobby Hutcherson)
20. "Keeps It Krisp" (featuring Kazi)
21. "Now U Know" (from Push Comes to Shove) - (featuring MED)
22. "Space Goat (Madlib Remix)" (featuring Diverse)
23. "Home Turf (Madlib Remix)" (featuring Charizma)
24. "Offbeat (Groove)" (from Beat Konducta Vol 1–2: Movie Scenes)
25. "Right Now" (featuring Oh No)
26. "Duck Sex (Outro)"

== Volume 2 ==
Mind Fusion Vol. 2

Compilation album by Madlib
- Released: 2004
- Genre: Jazz, funk, Jazz fusion, Brazilian funk
- Length: 51:52
- Label: Mind Fusion Records
- Producer: Madlib

Madlib chronology
Mind Fusion Vol. 1 (2004)	Mind Fusion Vol. 2 (2004)	Mind Fusion Vol. 3 (2005)

Mind Fusion Vol. 2 is second of the Mind Fusion series. This mixtape was released by Madlib under his Mind Fusion imprint. It is a compilation of many songs from different genres from the '60s to the '80s. Like other Mind Fusion mixtapes, this mixtape was released in very limited quantities and is a very rare and collectible item today.

=== Track listing ===
All tracks are compiled and mixed by Madlib.

CD Track	#	Artist	Title	Album	Year
1	1	Nat Adderley	Song of the Valdez Diamond	Double Exposure	1975
	2	Brian Auger's Oblivion Express	Beginning Again	Straight Ahead	1975
	3	Johnny Hammond	Back to the Projects	Gambler's Life	1974
	4	Calvin Keys	Shawn-Neeq	Shawn-Neeq	1971
	5	Cesar Mariano & Cia.	Metropole	São Paulo Brasil	1977
	6	Human Egg	Love Like This	Human Egg	1978
	7	Michal Urbaniak's Fusion	Ilex	Atma	1974
	8	Peter Lipa	My Album	Moanin'	1984
	9	Mary Lou Williams	Pale Blue	Free Spirits	1975
2	10	Henry Franklin	Cosmos Dwellers	Tribal Dance	1977
	11	Azymuth	Partido Alto	Light as a Feather	1979
	12	Elvin Jones	Moon Dance	Time Capsule	1977
	13	Patrice Rushen	Before the Dawn	Before the Dawn	1975
	14	Juju	Nia (Complete the Circle)	Chapter Two: Nia	1974
	15	Marcos Valle	Não Tem Nada Não (Instrumental)	Previsão do Tempo	1973
	16	Azar Lawrence	Theme for a New Day	People Moving	1976
3	17	Cortex	Automne	Troupeau bleu	1975
	18	Joyce	Longe do Tempo	Encontro Marcado	1969
	19	Jackie McLean	Soul	'Bout Soul	1967
	20	Ennio Morricone	Dies irae psichedelico	Escalation	1968
	21	Ken Rhodes	The Profile	Profile	1974
	22	Stefano Torossi	Fearing Much	Feelings	1975
	23	Duke Ellington	Digeridoo	The Afro-Eurasian Eclipse	1971
	24	Marcos Valle	Azimuth	Mustang Côr de Sangue	1969
	25	Bayete Umbra Zindiko Quintet	Let It Take Your Mind	Seeking Other Beauty	1972
	26	Azymuth	Nothing Will Be as It Was (Nada Será Como Antes)	Telecommunication	1982
	27	Jackie McClean	Soul	'Bout Soul	1967
	28	Lorez Alexandria	Baltimore Oriole	How Will I Remember You	1978
	29	Pharoah Sanders/Norman Connors	Casino Latino	Beyond a Dream	1978
	30	George Duke	Nigerian Numberuma	The Inner Source	1971
	31	George Duke	Feels So Good	The Inner Source	1971
	32	Jackie McClean	Soul	'Bout Soul	1967
	33	Willie Tee and the Gaturs	Concentrate	[B-side of single "Get Up"]	1980
	34	Egberto Gismonti	Janela de Ouro	Sonho 70	1970
	35	Cal Green	Revolution Rap - Part 2	[single]	1967

== Volume 3 ==
Mind Fusion Vol. 3

Compilation album by Madlib
- Released: 2005
- Genre: Funk, Jazz, Hip hop, Reggae, Dub
- Length: 57:46
- Label: Mind Fusion Records
- Producer: Madlib

Madlib chronology
Mind Fusion Vol. 2 (2004)	Mind Fusion Vol. 3 (2005)	Mind Fusion Vol. 4 (2006)

Mind Fusion Vol. 3 is compilation mixtape by hip hop producer Madlib independently released in 2005. This album is a mix-up of Funk, Jazz, Dub and hip hop instrumentals released in a total of 8 tracks on CD format.

=== Track list ===
1. "Just A" - 5:25
2. "Collection" - 6:33
3. "Of The" - 8:25
4. "Hottest" - 5:02
5. "Shit" - 11:49
6. "Madlib" - 10:07
7. "Has Ever" - 7:02
8. "Produced" - 3:23

== Volume 4 ==
Mind Fusion Vol. 4

Remix album by Madlib
- Released: 2006
- Recorded: 2006
- Genre: Hip hop, Jazz, Remix
- Length: 69:07
- Label: Mind Fusion Records
- Producer: Madlib

Madlib chronology
Mind Fusion Vol. 3 (2005)	Mind Fusion Vol. 4 (2006)	Mind Fusion Vol. 5 (2007)

Mind Fusion Vol. 4 is a remix album by hip hop producer Madlib independently released in 2007. This album features remixes of songs by Nas and Jay-Z and others.

=== Track list ===
Track list adapted from Rappcats.com.

CD Track	#	Title	Artist
1	1	Getup (Madlib Remix)	DJ Roddy Rod
	2	Pause (Madlib Remix)	Frank N Dank
	3	6 Minutes (Madlib Remix)	O Solo
	4	Instrumental	Madlib
2	5	Butter King Jewels	Madvillain
3	6	La Rumba	RZA featuring Method Man
	7	Wild Out	The LOX
4	8	Instrumental	Madlib
	9	Stacy Epps (Madlib Remix)	Stacy Epps
	10	MED & Poke Dog (Madlib Remix)	MED, Poke Dog
	11	The Cold One (Instrumental)	Madvillain
5	12	Get Down (Madlib Remix)	Nas
6	13	Public Service Announcement (Madlib Remix)	Jay-Z
	14	Made You Look (Madlib Remix)	Nas
	15	99 Problems (Madlib Remix)	Jay-Z
	16	Hey Nas (Madlib Remix)	Nas
7	17	Moment of Clarity (Madlib Remix)	Jay-Z
	18	Zone Out (Madlib Remix)	Nas
	19	Allure (Madlib Remix)	Jay-Z
8	20	Further Adventures of Walkman Flavor (circa 1993-1996)	Declaime, Madlib, Quasimoto, Wildchild, Medaphoar
9	21	Interlude	Madlib
10	22	Planet Asia (Madlib Remix)	Planet Asia
	23	Bump Bump (Madlib Remix)	Raekwon
	24	MC Unknown (Madlib Remix)	MC Unknown
	25	Stick & Move (Madlib Remix)	Planet Asia
11	26	Wanted (Madlib Remix)	Beanie Siegel
	27	Madlib Freestyle	Madlib
	28	Large Professor (Madlib Remix)	Large Professor
12	29	Buzzin' (Madlib Remix)	Royce da 5'9"
	30	Oh No (Madlib Remix)	Oh No
	31	Instrumental	Madlib
13	32	Monkey Suite (Instrumental)	Madvillain
	33	Drainos	Madvillain
14	34	Poke Dog (Madlib Remix)	Poke Dog

== Volume 5 ==
Mind Fusion Vol. 5

Remix album by Madlib
- Released: 2007
- Recorded: 2006–2007
- Genre: Hip hop, Remix, Jazz, Funk
- Length: 72:53
- Label: Mind Fusion Records
- Producer: Madlib

Madlib chronology
Mind Fusion Vol. 4 (2006)	Mind Fusion Vol. 5 (2007)

Mind Fusion Vol. 5 is the fifth and last mixtape of the Mind Fusion series by hip hop producer Madlib. This mixtape focuses on "dirty hip hop crates" from around the world as stated on the back cover. Following tradition, this mixtape was also independently released by Madlib on his Mind Fusion imprint in CD format.

=== Track list ===
The whole album features only two lengthy tracks which have about 10 to 15 different beats each mixed together.

Track 1 - Dirty Crates From Around The World (35:58)

Start Time	Title	Artist
00:00	The Seeker	Rahsaan Roland Kirk
02:13	?	?
03:03	Soledad	The Chakachas
04:42	?	?
05:30	Joy	Ruphus
06:49	We Can Make It If We Try	The Sylvers
09:17	Kurdistan	Embryo
10:45	People Make the World Go Round	Ramon Morris
12:21	Song of the Second Moon	Tom Dissevelt & Kid Baltan
15:21	Pick Your Feet Off the Ground	Real Ax Band
17:56	Sneak	Grupo Oz
19:42	Revelation	Barrington Levy
21:11	Keep the Faith	Steve Mancha
22:44	Black Vibrations	Marc Copland & John Abercrombie
25:10	Sound Industrial 15	Roger Roger
26:02	Elephant Dance	A.K. Salim
29:21	Africana	Free Son
32:39	Y Gwylwyr	Bran
34:08	Malicious Intent	Roots Radics

Track 2 - Live At The Do-Over (36:55)

Start Time	Title	Artist
00:00	Jungle Love	J Dilla
01:50	Funky Dudley	Dudley Perkins
03:05	Congoman	The Congos
04:25	Street Rap	Maulawi
05:55	E=MC²	J Dilla
08:45	Aldeia De Ogum	Joyce Moreno
10:09	I'll Do My Best (For You Baby)	The Ritchie Family
13:26	Gotta Get Your Love	Clyde Alexander
18:00	Beej N Dem	Slum Village
19:03	Hollywood Dreams	Father's Children
21:17	Beat Konducta (Instrumental)	Madlib
22:44	Beat Konducta (Instrumental)	Madlib
23:56	Monkey Suite	Madvillain
26:24	Diamonds	J Dilla
27:44	Baby	J Dilla
28:38	Two Can Win	J Dilla
30:15	Minsato Le, Mi Dayihome	Orchestre Poly-Rythmo de Cotonou Dahomey
32:00	Interlude	Madlib
34:00	You Never Come Closer	Doris
35:16	Malicious Intent	Scientist
36:15	Pigs Go Home	Ronald Stein
