= Animal Serum =

Studio album by Prince Po and Oh No
- Released: February 4, 2014
- Genre: Hip-hop
- Length: 43:12
- Labels: Wandering Worx; Green Streets Entertainment
- Producer: Oh No

Prince Po chronology
Saga of the Simian Samurai (2007)	Animal Serum (2014)

Oh No chronology
The Subliminal Substance (2013)	Animal Serum (2014)	3 Dimensional Prescriptions (2017)

Animal Serum is the first collaborative album by hip-hop artists Prince Po and Oh No. It was released on February 4, 2014, by Wandering Worx and Green Streets Entertainment. The work on Animal Serum started in 2007, with a few songs recorded as an experiment, before it turned into a full-length album. The album took several years to finish due to Oh No's involvement in other projects. Animal Serum received mostly positive reviews from music critics, but some of them found Oh No's production to be monotonous.

== Background ==
Following the release of three studio albums as part of the group Organized Konfusion, Prince Po focused on his solo career. Animal Serum was the first full-length album he released since 2007. Oh No started his career in the late 1990s with guest features and production for his brother Madlib's group Lootpack. By 2014, he had released numerous projects, both solo and as part of the Gangrene duo with the Alchemist, and had composed several soundtracks, including the soundtrack for 2013 video game Grand Theft Auto V.

== Recording ==
Prince Po and Oh No met when Prince Po was working on Madlib-produced Percee P's album Perseverance (2007). Immediately, the two started working together, with Oh No sending beats and Prince Po presenting his unfinished verses over the phone. Animal Serum was started with a few songs the duo recorded to experiment, eventually turning into a full-fledged album. Due to Oh No's involvement in various other projects and soundtracks, completing the album took longer than expected.

== Release ==
Animal Serum was released on February 4, 2014, by Wandering Worx and Green Streets Entertainment. The album was supported by the release of music videos for four of the album's tracks: "Smash", "Machine Rages", "1st Word To What Was Last Said", and "Keep Reachin".

== Critical reception ==
Professional ratings
Review scores
Source	Rating
Exclaim!	6/10
HipHopDX	3.5/5 stars
RapReviews	8.5/10

Animal Serum received mostly positive reviews from music critics, with some of them finding the album's production to be monotonous. Kevin Jones of Exclaim! shared this view, as he believed that the album would benefit from incorporating a more diverse sonic palette. He also noted the use of "stormy guitar and organ combination" throughout the album and Prince Po's verbal aggression. HipHopDX's Jay Balfour also thought the album "does end up striking the same note at least one times too many", but still viewed it as a "thematically aggressive project" that isn't overly simplistic. RapReviews praised the album, describing it as "dark magic". Gary Suarez, writing for The Quietus, was more critical, as he believed both Prince Po and Oh No underperformed. The reviewer asserted that Animal Serum lacks the level of excitement of Oh No's previous albums and that Prince Po's "flaky metaphorical framework frequently falls short", listing "Machine Rages", "Toxic", and "U" as highlights of the record.

== Track listing ==
All tracks are written by Prince Po. All tracks are produced by Oh No.

No.	Title	Length
1.	"Lamina Mures Intro"	0:41
2.	"Machine Rages"	3:21
3.	"U Already" (feat. Rockness Monsta and Saafir)	4:40
4.	"Keep Reachin"	3:54
5.	"1st Word To What Was Last Said"	2:14
6.	"Where U Eat"	3:08
7.	"Smash" (feat. O.C. and Pharoahe Monch)	3:52
8.	"Visionz"	2:33
9.	"Wavy" (feat. Sadat X)	3:27
10.	"Toxic"	2:30
11.	"Bears" (feat. Roc C)	2:24
12.	"U"	3:51
13.	"Starflyer Milez"	3:38
14.	"Givitup"	2:53
