= Hella International =

Hella International is a yearly music event presented by Stones Throw Records at Miami's Winter Music Conference.

In 2009 Stones Throw released Hella International as a compilation album box-set containing three 12-inch vinyls. The album features many of the songs from Chrome Children Vol. 2 as well as some exclusive Madlib remixes of some J Dilla tracks.

The Stones Throw Podcast has also featured sets by artists at Hella International, including Madlib (podcast #31), Karriem Riggins (#32), and Gaslamp Killer (#44).

== Track listing ==
Track listing
#	Title	Composer(s)	Performer(s)	Producer(s)	Time
A1	"Volta Por Cima"	K. Riggins; O. Jackson Jr.	Supreme Team (Madlib & Karriem Riggins)	Madlib	
A2	"Volta Por Cima [Instrumental]"	K. Riggins; O. Jackson Jr.	Supreme Team (Madlib & Karriem Riggins)	Madlib	
A3	"Bubbha's Dance"	J. Jackson	J Rocc	J Rocc	
B1	"The $ [Madlib Remix]"	J. Yancey; O. Jackson Jr.	J Dilla	J Dilla; Madlib	
B2	"Make 'Em NV [Madlib Remix]"	J. Yancey; O. Jackson Jr.	J Dilla	J Dilla; Madlib	
C1	"Chrome Dreams"	O. Jackson Jr.	Beat Konducta	Madlib	
C2	"Rhymes With An L"	N. Rodriguez; T. Mullinix	M.E.D.	Dabrye	
C3	"Rhymes With An L [Instrumental]"	N. Rodriguez; T. Mullinix	M.E.D.	Dabrye	
D1	"Reverse, Pt. 2"	J. Simon; K. Ghosh	Percee P	Koushik	
D2	"Reverse, Pt. 2 [Instrumental]"	J. Simon; K. Ghosh	Percee P	Koushik	
D3	"Statix"	M. Lezan	Arabian Prince		
E1	"BMX Rhythm Track"	J. Singleton	James Pants	James Pants	
E2	"Burn Rubber [Dam Funk Remix]"		Baron Zen		
F1	"Happy Now?"	E. Dawkins III; K. Hebden	Aloe Blacc	Four Tet	
F2	"Happy Now? [Instrumental]"	E. Dawkins III; K. Hebden	Aloe Blacc	Four Tet	
