= Chrome Children Vol. 2 =

Compilation album by various artists
- Released: January 2007
- Genre: Hip hop
- Label: Stones Throw; Adult Swim
- Producer: Madlib; Dabrye; Oh No; Gary Davis; Koushik; Decyphur; Four Tet; Danny Breaks; J. Rocc; Gary Wilson; Clifford Nyren; Yesterdays New Quintet; James Pants; Arabian Prince

Stones Throw Records chronology
Chrome Children (2006)	Chrome Children Vol. 2 (2007)	Peanut Butter Wolf Presents Stones Throw: Ten Years (2007)

Chrome Children Vol. 2 is a follow-up to the 2006 album, Chrome Children. It is a co-production between Stones Throw Records and Adult Swim. It is available as a free downloadable EP on the Adult Swim website. It was also released in an unedited form on iTunes.

== Track listing ==
1. "Chrome Dreams"
  - Performed by Madlib the Beat Konducta
  - Produced by Madlib
2. "Rhymes with an L"
  - Performed by M.E.D.
  - Produced by Dabrye
  - Cuts by J. Rocc
3. "Livin'In the City"
  - Performed by Roc C
  - Produced by Oh No
4. "Stay with Me (Instrumental)"
  - Performed by Chocolate Star
  - Produced by Gary Davis
5. "Reverse Part Two (Koushik Remix)"
  - Performed by Percee P
  - Produced by Koushik
  - Cuts by J. Rocc
6. "Get Back"
  - Performed by Oh No
  - Produced by Decyphur
7. "Money Motivated Movements"
  - Performed by Guilty Simpson
  - Produced by Four Tet
  - Cuts by J. Rocc
8. "Selah's Children"
  - Performed by Madlib the Beat Konducta
  - Produced by Madlib
9. "Theme (Danny Breaks Remix)"
  - Performed by Baron Zen
  - Produced by Danny Breaks
10. "Happy Now?"
  - Performed by Aloe Blacc
  - Produced by Four Tet
11. "Bubbha's Dance"
  - Performed by J. Rocc
  - Produced by J. Rocc
  - Cuts by J. Rocc
12. "Soul Traveling"
  - Performed by Gary Wilson
  - Produced by Gary Wilson
13. "Keep Running Away (Egon's Edit)"
  - Performed by Clifford Nyren
  - Produced by Clifford Nyren
14. "Marcus, Martin and Malcolm"
  - Performed by The Jazzistics
  - Produced by Yesterdays New Quintet
15. "Murder"
  - Performed by James Pants
  - Produced by James Pants
16. "Strange Life"
  - Performed by Arabian Prince
  - Produced by Arabian Prince

== Samples ==
- "Livin' in the City" contains samples from:
  - "Livin' in the City" performed by The Melton Brothers, featuring Alfie Moss
- "Reverse Part Two [Koushik Remix]" contains samples from:
  - "Yaz Gazeteci Yaz" performed by Selda
  - "Ince Ince" performed by Selda
- "Bubbha's Dance" contains samples from:
  - "The Phantom" performed by Bubbha Thomas
