= Push Comes to Shove (MED album) =

Studio album by MED
- Released: May 31, 2005
- Studio: The New Loop Digga Hideaway (Los Angeles, CA); The Smash (Oxnard, CA); John Anonymous Studios (Simi Valley, CA); Bionic (Los Angeles, CA); Def Con IV (Los Angeles, CA)
- Genre: Hip-hop
- Length: 50:51
- Label: Stones Throw
- Producer: J Dilla; Just Blaze; Madlib; Oh No

MED chronology
Push Comes to Shove (2005)	Classic (2011)

Professional ratings
Review scores
Source	Rating
AllMusic	2.5/5 stars
Cokemachineglow	59/100%
IGN	8/10
Pitchfork	6.7/10
Prefix	5/10
RapReviews	6.5/10

Push Comes to Shove is the debut studio album by American rapper MED. It was released on May 31, 2005, via Stones Throw Records. Recording sessions took place at the New Loop Digga Hideaway, Bionic and Def Con IV in Los Angeles, at the Smash in Oxnard and at John Anonymous Studios in Simi Valley. Production was handled by Madlib, J Dilla, Oh No and Just Blaze. It features guest appearances from Noelle Scaggs, Baby Sagg, Declaime, Diamond D, J Dilla, Oh No and Pok Dog.

== Track listing ==
No.	Title	Writer(s)	Producer(s)	Length
1.	"Intro"	Otis Jackson Jr.	Madlib	1:17
2.	"Serious" (featuring Oh No)	Nick Rodriguez; Jackson Jr.	Madlib	2:17
3.	"Whut U in It 4" (featuring Baby Sagg)	Rodriguez; Michael Jackson	Oh No	3:49
4.	"Can't Hold On"	Rodriguez; Jackson Jr.	Madlib	3:02
5.	"Push" (featuring J Dilla)	Rodriguez; James Yancey	J Dilla	2:29
6.	"Special" (featuring Noelle Scaggs)	Rodriguez; Jackson Jr.	Madlib	3:33
7.	"The Offering" (Interlude)	Jackson Jr.	Madlib	1:01
8.	"Hold Your Breath"	Rodriguez; Jackson Jr.	Madlib	3:38
9.	"Now U Know" (featuring Dudley Perkins)	Rodriguez; Jackson Jr.	Madlib	2:42
10.	"Pressure" (featuring Diamond D and Pok Dog)	Rodriguez; Jackson Jr.	Madlib	4:36
11.	"Never Saw It Coming"	Rodriguez; Jackson Jr.	Madlib	3:24
12.	"So Real"	Rodriguez; Yancey	J Dilla	4:10
13.	"Never Give U Up"	Rodriguez; Jackson	Oh No	2:41
14.	"Mary J Interlude"	Jackson Jr.	Madlib	0:49
15.	"Get Back"	Rodriguez; Justin Smith	Just Blaze	2:46
16.	"Listen 2 This"	Rodriguez; Jackson Jr.	Madlib	1:54
17.	"Yeah"	Rodriguez; Jackson Jr.	Madlib	3:31
18.	"Nightlife" (featuring Noelle Scaggs)	Rodriguez; Noelle Scaggs; Jackson Jr.	Madlib	3:12
Total length:				50:51

== Personnel ==
- Nick "Medaphoar" Rodriguez – main artist
- Michael "Oh No" Jackson – featured artist (track 2), producer (tracks: 3, 13)
- Baby Sagg – featured artist (track 3)
- James "J Dilla" Yancey – featured artist (track 5), producer (tracks: 5, 12)
- Noelle Scaggs – featured artist (tracks: 6, 18)
- Dudley "Declaime" Perkins – featured artist (track 9)
- Joseph "Diamond D" Kirkland – featured artist (track 10)
- Gene "Pok Dog" Diltz – featured artist (track 10)
- Otis "Madlib" Jackson Jr. – scratches, producer (tracks: 1, 2, 4, 6–11, 13, 14, 16–18), recording (tracks: 1, 7, 14)
- Romeo "DJ Romes" Jimenez – scratches, recording (tracks: 2, 4, 5, 8, 10–13, 17)
- Justin "Just Blaze" Smith – producer (track 15)
- John Anonymous – recording (tracks: 3, 6, 9, 18)
- Dave Cooley – recording (track 16), mixing, editing, mastering
- Josh "Tone" Weaver – vocal recording (tracks: 6, 18)
- David Brown – recording engineer (track 15)
- Christopher "Peanut Butter Wolf" Manak – executive producer
- Eric Coleman – photography
- Eothen Alapatt – coordinator

== Charts ==
Chart (2005)	Peak position
UK Vinyl Albums (OCC)	38
