= Bad Neighbor =

Bad Neighbor may refer to:

- Bad Neighbor (album), a 2015 album by MED, Blu and Madlib
- Bad Neighbor (film), a 2020 Chilean documentary film
