= The Disrupt =

Studio album by Oh No
- Released: October 5, 2004
- Genre: Hip-hop
- Length: 50:05
- Label: Stones Throw
- Producer: Oh No, Madlib, J Dilla, Kan Kick

Oh No chronology
The Disrupt (2004)	Exodus into Unheard Rhythms (2006)

Singles from The Disrupt
- 1. "The Ride" Released: September 3, 2004

Professional ratings
Review scores
Source	Rating
AllMusic	3.5/5 stars
Dusted Magazine	mixed
Pitchfork	7.8/10

The Disrupt is the debut studio album by American hip-hop musician Oh No. It was released on October 5, 2004 by Stones Throw Records.

== Track listing ==
No.	Title	Producer	Length
1.	"I'm Here (Intro)"	Oh No	2:28
2.	"Right Now"	Madlib	3:04
3.	"Move" (featuring Roc C)	J Dilla	2:37
4.	"Perceptions"	Oh No	3:35
5.	"Stomp That, V. 2" (featuring Wildchild)	Madlib	3:04
6.	"Seventeen"	Oh No	1:37
7.	"Break"	Oh No	3:28
8.	"The Ride" (featuring Medaphoar)	Oh No	3:56
9.	"Getaway" (featuring Aloe Blacc)	Oh No	3:32
10.	"I Can't Help Myself" (featuring Stacy Epps)	Oh No	3:29
11.	"Every Section" (featuring Cornbread)	Madlib	2:45
12.	"WTF" (featuring Wildchild)	Oh No	2:28
13.	"My Aggin"	Madlib	2:29
14.	"Take Another (Blunted Conversations)" (featuring Kan Kick)	Kan Kick	3:48
15.	"Green Tree" (featuring Dudley Perkins)	Oh No	1:06
16.	"Chosen One"	Madlib	2:40
17.	"On My Way"	Oh No	3:59
