= Exodus into Unheard Rhythms =

Studio album by Oh No
- Released: August 8, 2006
- Studios: Watch Ya Step Studios, Oxnard, California
- Genre: Hip-hop
- Length: 57:28
- Label: Stones Throw Records
- Producer: Oh No

Oh No chronology
The Disrupt (2004)	Exodus into Unheard Rhythms (2006)	Dr. No's Oxperiment (2007)

Exodus Into Unheard Rhythms is the second studio album by Oh No, an American hip-hop rapper and producer. It was released on Stones Throw Records in 2006.

== Background ==
Oh No started working on the album when Stones Throw's manager Eothen "Egon" Alapatt asked him to compose two tracks for his series called Fan Club 45s, but Oh No instead recorded 27 beats in three days. Overall he made around 50 beats for the album, and was planning to split them into two albums. Oh No produced the album using only samples from Galt MacDermot.

== Critical reception ==
Professional ratings
Review scores
Source	Rating
AllMusic	3.5/5 stars
The A.V. Club	B+
Exclaim!	(favorable)
Pitchfork	8.0/10
Prefix	6.0/10
RapReviews	9/10

Exodus Into Unheard Rhythms received favorable reviews from the music critics. Peter Macia of Pitchfork praised the album, saying that "Oh No gracefully layers these compositions the way MacDermont did with his own, fusing inspirations with the same wide-eyed gusto and ending up with the same kind of buoyant and elegant songs". Nathan Rabin, writing for The A.V. Club, called the album "a typically eccentric project for [Stones Throw]" that "finds [...] Oh No transforming the vast archive of Hair composer Galt McDermott into kaleidoscopic beats". AllMusic reviewer John Bush wrote that the album sounds better than the previous Oh No's album, but the production still outshines the lyrics. Del F. Cowie of Exclaim! called the album "a loose, refreshing and invigorating affair" and noted the "ear-grabbing production". Eric Solomon from Prefix praised the instrumentals, which he called "as funky as you might expect", but also criticized some of the guest performances. Andrew Matson of RapReviews ended his review saying that "the crowning achievement is that Oh No has not only made a great album, but also paved the way for rap fans to get into music that they might not check out normally".

== Track listing ==
No.	Title	Writer(s)	Length
1.	"Intro"	M. Jackson, G. MacDermot	1:36
2.	"Beware" (featuring Cali Agents)	M. Jackson, G. MacDermot, J. Greene	3:19
3.	"Black" (featuring Wise Intelligent)	M. Jackson, G. MacDermot, T. Grimes	3:50
4.	"Get Yours" (featuring Buckshot)	M. Jackson, G. MacDermot, K. Blake	2:56
5.	"Interlude"	M. Jackson, G. MacDermot	0:30
6.	"To Be an MC" (featuring K. Jay)	M. Jackson, G. MacDermot, K. Jackson	3:19
7.	"To Be an MC Reprise" (featuring K. Jay)	M. Jackson, G. MacDermot, K. Jackson	0:39
8.	"Keep Tryin'" (featuring Roc C and Aloe Blacc)	M. Jackson, G. MacDermot, N. Dawkins, D. Smith	3:33
9.	"Know Better" (featuring Wordsworth)	M. Jackson, G. MacDermot, V. Johnson	4:20
10.	"Second Chance" (featuring Aloe Blacc)	M. Jackson, G. MacDermot, N. Dawkins	3:30
11.	"Low Coastin'" (featuring A.G.)	M. Jackson, G. MacDermot, A. Barnes	2:57
12.	"Hank" (featuring LMNO)	M. Jackson, G. MacDermot, J. Kelly	3:41
13.	"No Aire" (featuring Vast Aire)	M. Jackson, G. MacDermot, T. Arrington	2:23
14.	"Cut Session" (featuring DJ Romes)	M. Jackson, G. MacDermot	0:46
15.	"Smile a Lil Bit" (featuring Posdnuos)	M. Jackson, G. MacDermot, K. Mercer	3:20
16.	"Keep It Lit" (featuring M.E.D. and Wildchild)	M. Jackson, G. MacDermot, N. Rodriguez, J. Brown	3:03
17.	"Callin' in T for Some Food"	M. Jackson, G. MacDermot	0:17
18.	"T. Biggums" (featuring Dudley Perkins and Georgia Anne Muldrow)	M. Jackson, G. MacDermot, D. Perkins, G.A. Muldrow	4:05
19.	"In This" (featuring Murs)	M. Jackson, G. MacDermot, N. Carter	3:29
20.	"Lights Out" (featuring Frank N Dank)	M. Jackson, G. MacDermot, D. Harvey, F. Bush	3:11
21.	"Basement Interlude"	M. Jackson, G. MacDermot	0:52
22.	"Coffee Cold" (featuring Fergus Macroy)	M. Jackson, G. MacDermot	1:52

== Credits ==
Credits are adapted from the album's liner notes.

- Oh No – recording, mixing
- DJ Romes – recording, mixing
- Peanut Butter Wolf – executive producer
- Kelly Hibbert – mastering
- B+ – photography
- Jeff Jank – design
- Eothen "Egon" Alapatt – project coordination
- Vincent MacDermot – project coordination
