= Get Dirty Radio =

Studio album by A.G.
- Released: October 31, 2006
- Recorded: 2005–06
- Studio: Handclap Studios (San Francisco, CA)
- Genre: Hip-hop
- Length: 47:16
- Label: Look Records
- Producer: A.G. (exec.); DJ Design (also exec.); Cochise; Jake One; J Dilla; Lord Finesse; Madlib; Oh No; Showbiz; Tommy Tee

A.G. chronology
The Dirty Version (1999)	Get Dirty Radio (2006)	Oasis (2009)

Singles from Get Dirty Radio
- 1. "Frozen / Hip Hop Quotable" Released: October 31, 2006

Professional ratings
Review scores
Source	Rating
AllHipHop	3.5/5 stars
AllMusic	3.5/5 stars
HipHopDX	3.5/5
Prefix	6/10
RapReviews	8/10

Get Dirty Radio is the second solo studio album by American rapper A.G. of Diggin' in the Crates Crew. It was released on October 31, 2006, through Look Records. Recording sessions took place at Handclap Studios in San Francisco, except for the song "We Don't Care", which was recorded in The Bronx. Production was handled by DJ Design, Madlib, Oh No, Tommy Tee, Cochise, Jake One, J Dilla, Lord Finesse and Showbiz. It features guest appearances from Aloe Blacc, Party Arty and Lil' Roze.

== Track listing ==
No.	Title	Writer(s)	Producer(s)	Length
1.	"Frozen"	Andre Barnes; Otis Jackson	Madlib	4:18
2.	"If I Wanna"	Barnes; Jacob Brian Dutton	Jake One	3:03
3.	"Take a Ride" (featuring Party Arty and Aloe Blacc)	Barnes; O. Jackson	Madlib	3:59
4.	"A Giant by Design"	Barnes; Keith Roman Griego	DJ Design	2:59
5.	"Yeah Nigga"	Barnes; Tommy Flaaten	Tommy Tee	3:17
6.	"Say Yeah" (featuring Lil' Roze)	Barnes	Cochise	3:06
7.	"Triumph"	Barnes; Griego	DJ Design	2:30
8.	"Love"	Barnes; Michael Woodrow Jackson	Oh No	3:17
9.	"Pray" (featuring Party Arty)	Barnes; Flaaten	Tommy Tee	2:56
10.	"Real Right Now"	Barnes; Griego	DJ Design	0:48
11.	"We Don't Care"	Barnes; Robert Hall	Lord Finesse	3:28
12.	"Gigantic"	Barnes; M. Jackson	Oh No	3:03
13.	"Hip Hop Quotable" (featuring Aloe Blacc)	Barnes; James Yancey	J Dilla	3:35
14.	"The Struggle"	Barnes; Rodney Lemay	Show	2:33
15.	"Outro"	Barnes; Griego	DJ Design	1:59
16.	"Who Dat?"	Barnes; Griego	DJ Design	2:25
Total length:				47:16

== Personnel ==
- Andre "A.G." Barnes – main artist, executive producer
- Arthur "Party Arty" Sheridan – featured artist (tracks: 3, 9)
- Egbert Nathaniel "Aloe Blacc" Dawkins III – featured artist (tracks: 3, 13)
- Lil' Roze – featured artist (track 6)
- Otis "Madlib" Jackson Jr. – producer (tracks: 1, 3)
- Jacob "Jake One" Dutton – producer (track 2)
- Keith "DJ Design" Griego – producer (tracks: 4, 7, 10, 15, 16), mixing, executive producer
- Tommy Flaaten – producer (tracks: 5, 9)
- Cochise – producer (track 6)
- Michael "Oh No" Jackson – producer (tracks: 8, 12)
- Robert "Lord Finesse" Hall – producer (track 11)
- James "J Dilla" Yancey – producer (track 13)
- Rodney "Showbiz" LeMay – producer (track 14)
- Dave Cooley – mastering
- Jeff Jank – design
- Pete Jones – photography
