= The Professionals (Madlib and Oh No album) =

Studio album by the Professionals
- Released: January 17, 2020
- Recorded: 2019
- Genre: Hip-hop
- Length: 44:29
- Label: Madlib Invazion
- Producers: Madlib; The Professionals (bonus)

Madlib chronology
| Bandana (with Freddie Gibbs) (2019) | The Professionals (2020) |

Oh No chronology
| A Long Red Hot Los Angeles Summer Night (with Blu) (2019) | The Professionals (2020) |

Singles from Superhumans
- 1. "Superhumans" Released: November 29, 2019

The Professionals is the debut collaborative studio album by the Professionals, an American duo consisting of sibling producers/rappers Madlib and Oh No. Entirely produced by Madlib, with raps mainly being provided by Oh No, the album was released on January 17, 2020, on Madlib's own imprint Madlib Invazion. The album features guest appearances from Adub, Elzhi, Chino XL, Freddie Gibbs, The Alchemist, and members of the Crate Diggas Palace collective (Wildchild, Roc C, MED and Kazi).

Professional ratings
Review scores
| Source | Rating |
|---|---|
| AllMusic | 3.5/5 stars |
| Consequence of Sound | B |
| Pitchfork | 6.7/10 |

== Track listing ==
Credits adapted from Tidal and Qobuz.

The Professionals Album – MMS-034
| No. | Title | Writer(s) | Producer(s) | Length |
|---|---|---|---|---|
| 1. | "My House" | Michael Jackson; Otis Jackson | Madlib | 1:15 |
| 2. | "The Pros" | M. Jackson; O. Jackson | Madlib | 1:56 |
| 3. | "Payday" (featuring Adub) | M. Jackson; O. Jackson | Madlib | 3:42 |
| 4. | "Give N Take" | M. Jackson; O. Jackson | Madlib | 4:19 |
| 5. | "Superhumans" (featuring Elzhi & Chino XL) | M. Jackson; O. Jackson; Derek Barbosa; Jason Powers | Madlib | 4:26 |
| 6. | "Buggin" | M. Jackson; O. Jackson | Madlib | 4:19 |
| 7. | "CDP Smackdown" | M. Jackson; O. Jackson | Madlib | 3:23 |
| 8. | "Timeless Treassure" | M. Jackson; O. Jackson | Madlib | 3:45 |
| 9. | "I Jus Wanna" | M. Jackson; O. Jackson | Madlib | 3:33 |
| 10. | "Away Too Long" | M. Jackson; O. Jackson | Madlib | 3:16 |
| 11. | "Make Due" | M. Jackson; O. Jackson | Madlib | 3:43 |
| 12. | "Tired Atlas" | M. Jackson; O. Jackson | Madlib | 3:11 |
| 13. | "Dishonored Valor" | M. Jackson; O. Jackson | Madlib | 3:41 |
| Total length: | | | | 44:29 |

The Professionals Instrumentals – MMS-035
| No. | Title | Writer(s) | Producer(s) | Length |
|---|---|---|---|---|
| 1. | "My House" (Instrumental) | O. Jackson | Madlib | 1:15 |
| 2. | "The Pros" (Instrumental) | O. Jackson | Madlib | 1:56 |
| 3. | "Payday" (Instrumental) | O. Jackson | Madlib | 3:42 |
| 4. | "Give N Take" (Instrumental) | O. Jackson | Madlib | 4:19 |
| 5. | "Superhumans" (Instrumental) | O. Jackson | Madlib | 4:26 |
| 6. | "Buggin" (Instrumental) | O. Jackson | Madlib | 4:19 |
| 7. | "CDP Smackdown" (Instrumental) | O. Jackson | Madlib | 3:23 |
| 8. | "Timeless Treasure" (Instrumental) | O. Jackson | Madlib | 3:45 |
| 9. | "I Jus Wanna" (Instrumental) | O. Jackson | Madlib | 3:33 |
| 10. | "Away Too Long" (Instrumental) | O. Jackson | Madlib | 3:16 |
| 11. | "Make Due" (Instrumental) | O. Jackson | Madlib | 3:43 |
| 12. | "Tired Atlas" (Instrumental) | O. Jackson | Madlib | 3:11 |
| 13. | "Dishonored Valor" (Instrumental) | O. Jackson | Madlib | 3:41 |
| Total length: | | | | 44:29 |

Next Day Bonus 7" – MMS-038
| No. | Title | Writer(s) | Producer(s) | Length |
|---|---|---|---|---|
| 1. | "Next Day" (performed by Freddie Gibbs and the Professionals) | M. Jackson; O. Jackson; Paul Ngozi; Fredrick Tipton | The Professionals | 2:42 |
| 2. | "Next Day" (Instrumental) | O. Jackson; Ngozi | The Professionals | 2:42 |
| Total length: | | | | 5:24 |
