= Push Comes to Shove =

Push Comes to Shove may refer to:

- Push Comes to Shove (Jackyl album), 1994
- Push Comes to Shove (MED album), 2005
- "Push Comes to Shove", a rock song by Van Halen for their 1981 album Fair Warning
- Push Comes to Shove, an animated short film by Bill Plympton
- Push Comes to Shove, the title of both a book and a ballet by Twyla Tharp
- "Push Comes to Shove", a song by Aerosmith from Rock in a Hard Place
