= Disrupted Ads =

Studio album by Oh No
- Released: January 29, 2013
- Recorded: 2012
- Genre: Hip-hop
- Label: Kash Roc Entertainment
- Producer: Oh No

Oh No chronology
Dr. No's Kali Tornado Funk (2012)	Disrupted Ads (2013)

Professional ratings
Review scores
Source	Rating
Exclaim!	8/10
PopMatters	7/10

Disrupted Ads is the seventh studio album by American hip-hop producer and rapper Oh No. It was released on January 29, 2013.

== Background ==
The album features guest appearances from Blu, MED, Rapsody, Psalm One, Tristate, Midaz, Chali 2na, Roc C, Gangrene, Declaime, Georgia Anne Muldrow and Souls of Mischief.

== Track listing ==
All tracks produced by Oh No

No.	Title	Length
1.	"Intro Doctors Visit"	0:17
2.	"Creepers"	1:19
3.	"Jones's" (featuring Blu and MED)	2:55
4.	"Trapped In"	1:04
5.	"Same Shit" (featuring Rapsody and Psalm One)	3:10
6.	"Boom"	1:49
7.	"The Difference"	2:04
8.	"Punchdrunkpatterns" (featuring Tristate and Midaz)	2:50
9.	"Perfect Cylinders"	0:25
10.	"Cleansing"	1:59
11.	"Animals" (featuring Chali 2na and Roc C)	2:49
12.	"The Magmas"	2:41
13.	"Rollin Up" (performed by Gangrene)	3:06
14.	"Drifters"	2:26
15.	"Improvement" (featuring Declaime and Georgia Anne Muldrow)	3:20
16.	"Outro"	0:34
17.	"Controlled Riots" (featuring Souls of Mischief)	3:37
