= Soundpieces: Da Antidote =

Soundpieces: Da Antidote!

Studio album by Lootpack
- Released: June 29, 1999
- Studio: Threshold
- Genre: Hip-hop
- Length: 73:42
- Label: Stones Throw
- Producer: Madlib

Lootpack chronology
| Psyche Move (1996) | Soundpieces: Da Antidote! (1999) | The Lost Tapes (2004) |

Singles from Soundpieces: Da Antidote!
- 1. "Whenimondamic" Released: 1998; 2. "The Anthem" Released: 1999

Soundpieces: Da Antidote! is the first full-length studio album by American hip-hop trio Lootpack. It was released on June 29, 1999, via Stones Throw Records. The album was produced by member Madlib. It features guest appearances from Medaphoar, Declaime, Godz Gift, Kazi, Oh No, Defari, Dilated Peoples, and tha Alkaholiks.

== Critical reception ==
Professional ratings
Review scores
| Source | Rating |
|---|---|
| AllMusic | 4.5/5 stars |
| RapReviews | 8/10 |
| The Source | 2.5/5 stars |
| Spin | 8/10 |
| XXL | XL (4/5) |

AllMusic's Steve Huey wrote: "Much of the album's success is due to fantastic production by Madlib, who takes his place as one of the West Coast's most imaginative trackmasters, underground or otherwise... The rapping, by Madlib and Wildchild plus a guest roster of West Coast scenesters, is consistently high-quality".

Del F. Cowie of Exclaim! gave the album a favorable review, commenting that "[while] there are minute traces of their inebriated associates found in their system, their willingness to experiment is the strength they build on to forge their own identity".

Stephen Thompson of The A.V. Club called it "a bit of a letdown, primarily because the band's relentless emphasis on keeping it real and defeating wack MCs gets mighty damn dull over the course of 24 tracks". He felt that "Madlib's P-Funk-inspired cut-and-paste production is impressive, with tracks stopping and starting and bleeding into each other, but inventive production only gets you so far".

== Track listing ==
| No. | Title | Writer(s) | Length |
|---|---|---|---|
| 1. | "Da Antidote" | | 1:34 |
| 2. | "Questions" | Otis Jackson Jr.; Jack Brown; Romeo Jimenez | 3:54 |
| 3. | "Long Awaited" (featuring Dilated Peoples) | Jackson Jr.; Brown; Jimenez; Michael Perretta; Rakaa Taylor | 4:45 |
| 4. | "B-Boy Theme" | Jackson Jr.; Brown | 0:52 |
| 5. | "Whenimondamic" | Jackson Jr.; Brown; Jimenez | 2:46 |
| 6. | "The Anthem" | Jackson Jr.; Brown; Jimenez | 3:26 |
| 7. | "Level Zero" (featuring Medaphoar and Oh No) | Jackson Jr.; Brown; Jimenez; Nick Rodriguez; Michael Jackson | 3:26 |
| 8. | "Crate Diggin" | Jackson Jr.; Jimenez | 2:55 |
| 9. | "Law of Physics" | Jackson Jr.; Brown; Jimenez | 2:29 |
| 10. | "Frenz Vs Endz" (featuring Kazi) | Jackson Jr.; Brown; Jimenez; Kevin Harper | 3:07 |
| 11. | "Interview with Kurt" | | 1:10 |
| 12. | "Speaker Smashin" | Jackson Jr.; Brown; Jimenez | 3:14 |
| 13. | "New Year's Resolution" | Jackson Jr.; Brown; Jimenez | 2:57 |
| 14. | "Answers" (featuring Quasimoto) | Jackson Jr.; Brown; Jimenez | 4:44 |
| 15. | "Likwit Fusion" (featuring Defari and Tha Alkaholiks) | Jackson Jr.; Brown; Jimenez; Duane Johnson; James Robinson; Rico Smith | 4:47 |
| 16. | "Hityawitdat" | Jackson Jr.; Jimenez | 3:13 |
| 17. | "Verbal Experiments" (featuring God's Gift) | Jackson Jr.; Brown; Jimenez; Garrick Williams | 3:43 |
| 18. | "Stylewild" | Jackson Jr.; Brown | 0:36 |
| 19. | "Weededed" | Jackson Jr.; Brown; Jimenez | 3:15 |
| 20. | "20 Questions" (featuring Quasimoto) | Jackson Jr.; Brown; Jimenez | 1:06 |
| 21. | "Break Dat Party" (featuring Declaime) | Jackson Jr.; Brown; Jimenez; Dudley Perkins | 3:35 |
| 22. | "Wanna Test" (featuring Medaphoar) | Jackson Jr.; Jimenez; Rodriguez | 3:24 |
| 23. | "Episodes" (featuring Kazi, God's Gift, Declaime, Oh No and Medaphoar) | | 8:44 |
| 24. | "Outro" | | 0:18 |
| Total length: | | | 1:13:42 |

== Personnel ==
- Otis "Madlib"/"Quasimoto" Jackson Jr. – vocals, producer
- Jack "Wildchild" Brown – vocals
- Romeo "DJ Romes" Jimenez – scratches
- Michael "Evidence" Perretta – vocals (track 3)
- Rakaa "Iriscience" Taylor – vocals (track 3)
- Nick "M.E.D." Rodriguez – vocals (tracks: 7, 22, 23)
- Michael "Oh No" Jackson – vocals (tracks: 7, 23)
- Kevin "Kazi" Harper – vocals (tracks: 10, 23)
- Duane "Defari" Johnson – vocals (track 15)
- James "J-Ro" Robinson – vocals (track 15)
- Rico "Tash" Smith – vocals (track 15)
- Garrick "Godz Gift" Williams – vocals (tracks: 17, 23)
- Dudley "Declaime" Perkins – vocals (tracks: 21, 23), cover
- "KutMasta Kurt" Matlin – mixing
- Chris "Peanut Butter Wolf" Manak – executive producer
