= Kan Kick =

Kankick
- Also known as: Kankick
- Born: Ted Hughes
- Origin: Oxnard, California, United States
- Genre: Hip Hop
- Occupation: Producer

Kankick (also spelled as Kan Kick, real name Ted Hughes) is an American hip-hop producer from Oxnard, Ventura County, CA.

== Career ==
Kan Kick grew up in the city of Oxnard, along with several fellow hip-hop musicians including Madlib, Oh No, DJ Romes and Dudley Perkins. In the early 1990s he was an integral part of Lootpack, appearing on several of their tracks. He has also produced some of The Alkaholiks' early tracks. Later he went on to produce a number of solo instrumental albums, as well as collaborate with several rappers and producers such as Planet Asia, Declaime and DJ Babu. His 2001 release, From Artz Unknown was his first official solo introduction and featured West Coast rappers such as Declaime, The Visionaries, Krondon, Phil Da Agony, Planet Asia, and Wildchild.

== Discography ==
- 2001: From Artz Unknown
- 2004: Acid Massive Musical
- 2004: The Traditional Heritage
- 2005: Seeing Spirits
- 2006: Serious Business This!
- 2008: Kan Kick Remixes
- 2009: Beautiful: Opus of Love, Deeper than Flesh
- 2011: Rummage to Royalty
