= Dr. No's Ethiopium =

Album by Oh No

Studio album by Oh No
- Released: November 16, 2009
- Genre: Hip-hop, trip hop, Ethiopian music
- Label: Disruption Productions
- Producer: Oh No

Oh No chronology
Dr. No's Oxperiment (2007)	Dr. No's Ethiopium (2009)	Sawblade EP (With The Alchemist, as Gangrene) (2010)

Professional ratings
Review scores
Source	Rating
HipHopDX	4/5 stars
Pitchfork	7.7/10

Dr. No's Ethiopium is the fourth album by hip-hop rapper and producer Oh No.

== Background ==
This solely instrumental album was released by Disruption Productions in 2009, and is described as an "album inspired-by and sampled-from rare 60s and 70s Ethiopian funk, jazz, folk, soul and psychedelic rock." The track "The Funk" was used in a Mountain Dew commercial. According to an article in the Los Angeles Times, that TV placement "beat CD sales 10 to 1 in terms of profit."

== Track listing ==
1. "Pardon Me"
2. "Madness"
3. "The Funk"
4. "Concentrate"
5. "Xcalibur"
6. "Pussy"
7. "Adventure"
8. "Soul Of Ethiopia"
9. "Dare Say"
10. "World Traveler"
11. "Scary"
12. "Carnival"
13. "Louder"
14. "Electronic Monsters"
15. "Problematic"
16. "Fuego Tribe"
17. "Midnight Missions"
18. "Melody Mix"
19. "Drive By"
20. "Juke Joint"
21. "Loopadors"
22. "Laxatives"
23. "Raw Block"
24. "Sneaky"
25. "A Hundred"
26. "Ox Therapy"
27. "Butta"
28. "All My"
29. "Fresh Bacon"
30. "Crazzzzy"
31. "Funeral Parlor"
32. "Strong"
33. "Questions"
34. "The Pain"
35. "Great Oracle"
36. "Whoo Doo"
- All tracks written by Oh No.
