= Dr. No's Oxperiment =

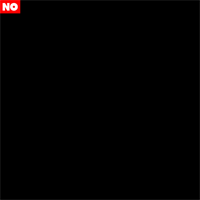

Studio album by Oh No
- Released: July 31, 2007
- Genres: Hip-hop; trip hop
- Label: Stones Throw
- Producer: Oh No

Oh No chronology
Exodus into Unheard Rhythms (2006)	Dr. No's Oxperiment (2007)	Dr. No's Ethiopium (2009)

Professional ratings
Review scores
Source	Rating
AllMusic	4/5 stars
Dusted	(favorable)
Pitchfork	4/5 stars
PopMatters	8/10
The Source	4/5 stars

Dr. No's Oxperiment is the third album by hip-hop rapper and producer Oh No. The solely instrumental album was released by Stones Throw Records in 2007, and is described as "an audio tour of Turkish, Lebanese, Greek, and Italian psyche funk".

== Track listing ==
1. "Heavy" – 1:54
2. "Gladius" – 1:22
3. "Higher" – 1:33
4. "Breakout" – 1:25
5. "Ox Broil" – 1:52
6. "Bouncers" – 1:36
7. "Alarmsss" – 1:25
8. "Banger" – 1:31
9. "No Guest List" – 1:20
10. "Land Mine" – 1:29
11. "My Luck" – 1:45
12. "Cosmos" – 1:49
13. "Exp out the Ox" – 1:01
14. "Emergency" – 1:42
15. "Ohhhhhh" – 1:00
16. "Deliveries" – 1:07
17. "Come Back" – 1:05
18. "Hot Fire" – 1:35
19. "Action" – 1:38
20. "Ghetto" – 1:30
21. "Fast Gamble" – 1:05
22. "All Over" – 0:49
23. "Mad Piano" – 1:33
24. "Oxcity Sickness" – 1:45
25. "Cassette" – 1:43
26. "Down Under" – 0:38
27. "Smokey Winds" – 1:21
28. "Slow Down" – 1:13
- All tracks written by Oh No.
