= Bad Neighbor (album) =

Studio album by M.E.D. / Blu / Madlib
- Released: October 30, 2015
- Recorded: 2012–15
- Genre: Hip-hop
- Length: 50:58
- Label: Bang Ya Head
- Producer: Madlib

M.E.D. / Blu / Madlib chronology
The Burgundy (2013)	Bad Neighbor (2015)	The Turn Up (2017)

Instrumental release
- Instrumentals only

Professional ratings
Aggregate scores
Source	Rating
Metacritic	81/100
Review scores
Source	Rating
AllMusic	4/5 stars
Consequence of Sound	B
HipHopDX	4/5 stars
Pitchfork	7.2/10
PopMatters	8/10 stars

Bad Neighbor is a collaborative studio album by rappers M.E.D. and Blu and producer Madlib. It was released on Bang Ya Head on October 30, 2015. It features guest appearances from the likes of MF Doom, Aloe Blacc, Mayer Hawthorne, Jimetta Rose, Dâm-Funk, and Oh No. The album was re-issued in 2021 with an altered tracklist, new mixes, and bonus tracks.

== Critical reception ==
At Metacritic, which assigns a weighted average score out of 100 to reviews from mainstream critics, Bad Neighbor received an average score of 81% based on 5 reviews, indicating "universal acclaim".

David Jeffries of AllMusic gave the album 4 stars out of 5, saying, "Bad Neighbor is as if the Ruff Ryders albums were reimagined by this trio and all the avant heads get to party, but it is also worth mentioning that the often slept-on MED and Blu seem to steer this beast as much as the beloved Madlib." Marcus J. Moore of Pitchfork gave the album a 7.2 out of 10, saying, "Bad Neighbor whizzes by in a blunted haze, which might be an insult to another project, but it works well here, when the stakes are low and the mood is most important."

== Track listing ==
Bad Neighbor
No.	Title	Length
1.	"Greetings"	0:53
2.	"Serving" (featuring Hodgy Beats)	3:33
3.	"Peroxide" (featuring DJ Romes and Dâm-Funk)	2:52
4.	"Get Money" (featuring Frank Nitty)	3:40
5.	"Streets" (featuring DJ Romes and Oh No)	3:37
6.	"The Stroll" (featuring AMG)	4:02
7.	"Knock Knock" (featuring MF Doom)	4:45
8.	"Mad Neighbor"	1:03
9.	"The Strip" (featuring Anderson .Paak)	3:51
10.	"Finer Things" (featuring Likewise and Phonte)	4:21
11.	"Burgundy Whip" (featuring Jimetta Rose)	2:58
12.	"Drive In" (featuring Aloe Blacc)	3:59
13.	"Belly Full" (featuring Black Spade)	3:26
14.	"Birds"	3:39
15.	"The Buzz" (featuring Mayer Hawthorne)	4:19
Total length:		50:58

Bad Neighbor – Anniversary Edition
No.	Title	Length
1.	"The Buzz" (featuring Mayer Hawthorne)	3:27
2.	"The Strip" (featuring Anderson .Paak)	3:47
3.	"Burgundy Whip" (featuring Jimetta Rose)	2:40
4.	"Peace Coming With Me"	2:13
5.	"Drive In" (featuring Aloe Blacc)	2:47
6.	"Knock Knock" (featuring MF Doom)	3:55
7.	"Peroxide" (featuring DJ Romes and Dâm-Funk)	2:39
8.	"Finer Things" (featuring Likewise and Phonte)	4:06
9.	"Whoop T" (featuring Jimetta Rose)	2:22
10.	"Serving" (featuring Hodgy Beats)	3:21
11.	"Birds"	2:25
12.	"Belly Full" (featuring Black Spade)	1:45
13.	"Get Money" (featuring Frank Nitty)	3:29
Total length:		38:56

== Charts ==
Chart	Peak position
US Independent Albums (Billboard)	41
