= Hallways (album) =

Studio album by Homeboy Sandman
- Released: September 2, 2014
- Genre: Hip-hop
- Length: 41:48
- Label: Stones Throw Records
- Producers: DJ Spinna; Jonwayne; 2 Hungry Bros.; J57; Oh No; Knxwledge; Sobermindedmusic; Professor Brian Oblivion; SOL626; Jozef van Wissem; Inspirmentalist

Homeboy Sandman chronology
| First of a Living Breed (2012) | Hallways (2014) | Kindness for Weakness (2016) |

Hallways is the fifth studio album by American rapper Homeboy Sandman. It was released by Stones Throw Records on September 2, 2014.

== Critical reception ==
Professional ratings
Aggregate scores
| Source | Rating |
|---|---|
| Metacritic | 79/100 |
Review scores
| Source | Rating |
| AllMusic | 4/5 stars |
| Clash | 8/10 |
| Cuepoint (Expert Witness) | A− |
| Exclaim! | 7/10 |
| HipHopDX | 4/5 stars |
| The Skinny | 4/5 stars |

At Metacritic, which assigns a weighted average score out of 100 to reviews from mainstream critics, the album received an average score of 79, based on 5 reviews, indicating "generally favorable reviews".

In a review for Cuepoint, Robert Christgau said Homeboy Sandman's perspective on "America, the Beautiful" was refreshing "from a man who's always been as class-conscious as alt-rap gets", while "Personal Ad" deeming "a sex boast few this side of Jay-Z would have the cool or balls to pull off".

== Track listing ==
| No. | Title | Producer(s) | Length |
|---|---|---|---|
| 1. | "1,2,3" | DJ Spinna | 2:11 |
| 2. | "America, the Beautiful" | Jonwayne | 2:32 |
| 3. | "Loads" (featuring Blu) | 2 Hungry Bros. | 3:09 |
| 4. | "Refugee" | Jonwayne | 4:11 |
| 5. | "Activity" | J57 | 2:45 |
| 6. | "Heaven Too" (featuring Oh No) | Oh No | 4:20 |
| 7. | "Problems" | Knxwledge | 4:34 |
| 8. | "Grand Pupa" | Sobermindedmusic | 4:00 |
| 9. | "Personal Ad" | Professor Brian Oblivion | 3:23 |
| 10. | "Stroll" | SOL626 | 4:53 |
| 11. | "Unraveling" (featuring Jozef van Wissem) | Jozef van Wissem | 2:39 |
| 12. | "Enough" (featuring J-Live and Kurious) | Inspirmentalist | 3:11 |
| Total length: | | | 41:48 |

== Personnel ==
Credits adapted from liner notes.

- Homeboy Sandman – vocals
- DJ Spinna – production (1)
- Jonwayne – production (2, 4)
- Blu – guest appearance (3)
- 2 Hungry Bros. – production (3)
- J57 – production (5)
- Oh No – guest appearance (6), production (6)
- Knxwledge – production (7)
- Sobermindedmusic – production (8)
- Professor Brian Oblivion – production (9)
- SOL626 – production (10)
- Jozef van Wissem – guest appearance (11), production (11)
- J-Live – guest appearance (12)
- Kurious – guest appearance (12)
- Inspirmentalist – production (12)
- Peanut Butter Wolf – executive production
- Alejandro "Sosa" Tello – recording, mixing, mastering
- Andrew Huffman – artwork
- Lauren Jaslow – photography
- Jeff Jank – design
