= Secondary Protocol =

Studio album by Wildchild
- Released: April 22, 2003
- Studios: Defcon 4; Creekside Recorders
- Genre: Hip-hop
- Length: 1:00:11
- Label: Stones Throw
- Producers: Madlib; Oh No

Wildchild chronology
Secondary Protocol (2003)	Jack of All Trades (2007)

Singles from Secondary Protocol
- 1. "Knicknack 2002" Released: 2002; 2. "Code Red" Released: 2003; 3. "Wonder Years" Released: 2004

Professional ratings
Review scores
Source	Rating
AllHipHop	4/5 stars
AllMusic	3/5 stars
Pitchfork	6.3/10
Prefix	8/10
RapReviews	8.5/10

Secondary Protocol is the debut solo studio album by American rapper Wildchild. It was released in April 2003 via Stones Throw Records. Recording sessions took place at Defcon 4 Studios and Creekside Recorders. Produced by Madlib and Oh No, it features guest appearances from Medaphoar, Aceyalone, LMNO, Oh No, Percee P, Phil Da Agony, Planet Asia, Spontaneous, Tha Alkaholiks and Vinia Mojica. The album was supported by three singles: "Khicknack 2002", "Code Red" and "Wonder Years".

The album's title meaning is about the artist wanting to show a more personal view, which is alternative to what he brings as a member of Lootpack. The title track is featured in the 2003 video game Tony Hawk's Underground.

== Track listing ==
No.	Title	Writer(s)	Producer(s)	Length
1.	"Intro"	Jack Brown; Otis Jackson	Madlib	0:32
2.	"Code Red"	Brown; Michael Jackson	Oh No	4:11
3.	"Hands Up"	Brown; O. Jackson	Madlib	3:47
4.	"The Come Off" (featuring Tha Liks and Phil Da Agony)	Brown; Rico Smith; James Robinson; M. Jackson	Oh No	3:47
5.	"The Movement (Part 2)"	Brown; M. Jackson	Oh No	3:32
6.	"Heartbeat" (featuring Oh No)	Brown; M. Jackson; O. Jackson	Madlib	3:51
7.	"Kiana"	Brown; M. Jackson; S. Harris	Oh No	4:15
8.	"Secondary Protocol"	Brown; O. Jackson	Madlib	5:25
9.	"Knicknack 2002" (featuring Percee P and Medaphoar)	Brown; John Simon; Nick Rodriguez; O. Jackson	Madlib	3:48
10.	"Puttin' in Work"	Brown; M. Jackson	Oh No	3:41
11.	"Bounce" (featuring Planet Asia, Spontaneous and Aceyalone)	Brown; Jason Green; Lawrence Palmer; Edwin Hayes; O. Jackson	Madlib	5:33
12.	"Wonder Years"	Brown; M. Jackson	Oh No	4:05
13.	"Party Up" (featuring Vinia Mojica)	Brown; Vinia Mojica; O. Jackson	Madlib	5:39
14.	"Operation Radio Raid" (featuring LMNO)	Brown; James Kelly; O. Jackson	Madlib	4:00
15.	"Feel It" (featuring Medaphoar)	Brown; Rodriguez; O. Jackson	Madlib	3:58
Total length:				1:00:11

Notes

- Track 15 is listed as a bonus track.

== Personnel ==
- Jack "Wildchild" Brown – lyrics
- Kiana Brown – additional vocals (track 3)
- Theresa Cancel – additional vocals (track 3)
- Ana Barritt – additional vocals (track 3)
- Eve – additional vocals (track 5)
- Morsha – additional vocals (track 7)
- Romeo "DJ Romes" Jimenez – scratches
- Otis "Madlib" Jackson – producer (tracks: 1, 3, 6, 8, 9, 11, 13-15)
- Michael "Oh No" Jackson – producer (tracks: 2, 4, 5, 7, 10, 12)
- Todd "Mum's The Word" Mumford – recording
- John Anonymous – recording
- Dave Cooley – mixing, mastering
- Christopher "Peanut Butter Wolf" Manak – executive producer
- Jeff Jank – art direction
- Brian "B+" Cross – photography
