= Expressions (2012 A.U.) =

Studio album by Dudley Perkins
- Released: April 18, 2006
- Recorded: 2005
- Studios: Def Con IV (Los Angeles, CA)
- Genre: Hip-hop
- Length: 41:58
- Label: Stones Throw
- Producer: Madlib

Professional ratings
Review scores
Source	Rating
AllHipHop	3.5/5 stars
AllMusic	3.5/5 stars
HipHopDX	3.5/5
IGN	7.1/10
Pitchfork	7.1/10
Prefix	8/10
RapReviews	9/10

Expressions (2012 A.U.) is a studio album by American rapper Declaime. It was recorded in 2005 at Def Con IV in Los Angeles and released on April 18, 2006 through Stones Throw Records. Produced by Madlib, it features a lone guest appearance from Georgia Anne Muldrow.

== Track listing ==
No.	Title	Length
1.	"Funky Dudley"	2:47
2.	"Me"	3:10
3.	"Testin' Me"	4:26
4.	"Get on Up"	3:03
5.	"Come Here My Dear"	3:07
6.	"That's the Way It's Gonna Be"	3:16
7.	"Domestic Interlude"	1:21
8.	"Separate Ways"	2:36
9.	"Dollar Bill"	3:07
10.	"Inside"	2:33
11.	"The Last Stand"	2:13
12.	"Coming Home"	2:04
13.	"Dear God"	8:15
Total length:		41:58
