= A Lil' Light =

Studio album by Dudley Perkins
- Released: July 15, 2003
- Genres: Hip-hop; R&B
- Length: 51:26
- Label: Stones Throw Records
- Producer: Madlib

Dudley Perkins chronology
Andsoitisaid (2001)	A Lil' Light (2003)	Conversations with Dudley (2004)

Singles from A Lil' Light
- 1. "Flowers" Released: 2001; 2. "Money" Released: 2003; 3. "Washedbrainsyndrome" Released: 2004

A Lil' Light is a studio album by American rapper Dudley Perkins. It was released via Stones Throw Records on July 15, 2003. The album is entirely produced by Madlib.

== Critical reception ==
Professional ratings
Review scores
Source	Rating
AllMusic	2/5 stars
The A.V. Club	unfavorable
East Bay Express	favorable
Exclaim!	favorable
Jockey Slut	7/10
Miami New Times	favorable
Pitchfork	4.1/10
PopMatters	favorable
SF Weekly	favorable

Eric K. Arnold of East Bay Express gave the album a favorable review, saying: "Producer Madlib's touch is evident in the album's schizophrenic mix of voices, weird arrangements, and esoteric musical elements, but there's no denying the emotional quotient that's missing from above-ground rap is alive and well here." David Morris of PopMatters said: "Aside from how enjoyable it is in and of itself, A Lil' Light also opens up new possibilities for R&B, brushing off both the pure gloss of the mainstream and the predictable over-emoting of neo-soul in favor of something more bracingly real."

== Track listing ==
All tracks are written by O. Jackson and D. Perkins.

No.	Title	Length
1.	"You Really Know Me?"	1:23
2.	"Momma"	4:16
3.	"The Light"	3:19
4.	"Money"	4:34
5.	"Washedbrainsyndrome"	4:36
6.	"Yo' Soul"	2:44
7.	"Muzak"	3:17
8.	"Falling"	4:02
9.	"Solitude"	3:18
10.	"Worship" (featuring Yesterdays New Quintet)	1:20
11.	"Flowers"	2:29
12.	"Lil' Black Boy"	3:56
13.	"Forevaendless"	0:54
14.	"Lord's Prayer"	3:49
15.	"Just Think"	2:29
16.	"Gotta Go" (featuring Yesterdays New Quintet)	5:00
Total length:		51:26

== Personnel ==
Credits adapted from liner notes.

- Dudley Perkins – vocals, lyrics, melodies, intro recording, interlude recording
- Madlib – production, intro recording, interlude recording, recording (11)
- David Lona a.k.a. Peanut – background vocals (2)
- Yesterdays New Quintet – guest appearance (10, 16)
- Todd Mumford – recording (1–10, 12–16), mixing (1–10, 12–16)
- Peanut Butter Wolf – mixing (11), executive production
- Dave Cooley – mastering
- Jeff Jank – art direction
- Andrew Gura – cover art
