= Bad Neighbor (film) =

- Promotional release poster
- Directed by: Ricardo Jara
- Written by: Ricardo Jara; Marcela Nieto
- Produced by: Ricardo Jara; Marcela Nieto
- Cinematography: Ricardo Jara; Marcela Nieto; Christian Salgado; Samuel Durán; Alexís Berrios; Javier Aguirre
- Edited by: Ricardo Jara; Marcela Nieto
- Music by: Ricardo Jara
- Production company: Cabrochico
- Release dates: March 13, 2020 (San Javier); October 30, 2021 (online); November 10, 2021 (theaters)
- Running time: 95 minutes
- Country: Chile
- Language: Spanish

Bad Neighbor (Spanish: Mal vecino) is a 2020 Chilean documentary film directed by Ricardo Jara and written by Jara & Marcela Nieto. It is about the fight of a community in the Maule Region against the company Coexca S.A. that since its installation in the rural zone generated a serious environmental danger.

== Synopsis ==
A community in the Maule Region is in conflict: the company Coexca S.A, dedicated to raising, slaughtering and exporting meat to Japan, decides to install a giant pig breeding farm in the rural San Javier commune. The project would be damaging to the local environment and cause pollution. The residents of San Janvier and Cauquenes decide to unite to stop the project.

== Release ==
Bad Neighbor had an initial premiere on March 13, 2020, at the Municipal Theater of San Javier, Chile. It premiered on October 30, 2021, on digital platforms, then starting on November 10 of the same year, it began a theatrical tour throughout Chile.

== Accolades ==
Year	Award / Festival	Category	Recipient	Result	Ref.
2020	Patagonia Eco Film Fest	Best Feature Film - Audience Award	Bad Neighbor	Won	
2020	Rengo International Film Festival	Best Editing	Ricardo Jara & Marcela Nieto	Won	
2021	Cali Environmental Film Festival	Green Screen Latin America	Bad Neighbor	Nominated	
2021	Viña del Mar International Film Festival	Best Film in the Territorial Gaze	Bad Neighbor	Won	
