= Perseverance (Percee P album) =

Studio album by Percee P
- Released: September 18, 2007
- Genre: Hip-hop
- Length: 54:05
- Label: Stones Throw Records
- Producer: Madlib

Percee P chronology
Legendary Status (2005)	Perseverance (2007)	Perseverance: The Remix (2007)

Singles from Perseverance
- 1. "Put It on the Line" Released: 2005; 2. "Throwback Rap Attack" Released: 2006; 3. "Watch Your Step" Released: 2007; 4. "No Time for Jokes / Last of the Greats" Released: 2008

Perseverance is the official debut studio album by American rapper Percee P. It was released on Stones Throw Records on September 18, 2007. All tracks are produced by Madlib. The album features guest appearances from Guilty Simpson, Diamond D, Chali 2na, Prince Po, and Aesop Rock, among others.

== Critical reception ==
Professional ratings
Review scores
Source	Rating
AllHipHop	favorable
AllMusic	4/5 stars
Cokemachineglow	mixed
Dusted Magazine	mixed
Exclaim!	favorable
Pitchfork	6.5/10
RapReviews.com	8.5/10
Tiny Mix Tapes	4/5 stars
XLR8R	8/10

Nate Patrin of Pitchfork gave the album a 6.5 out of 10 and praised Madlib's production, saying, "It's one of his most varied production jobs, unpredictable without being uncharacteristic, and his beats reach the perfect level of busy amplification to accompany Percee's flow." Neil Acharya of Exclaim! said, "Percee P and Madlib deserve each other and come together well in a marriage of hard rhyming and production ingenuity that has become a standard." Marisa Brown of AllMusic gave the album 4 stars out of 5, calling it "a very strong record" and "one definitely worth the wait."

PopMatters placed it at number 78 on the "101 Hip-Hop Albums of 2007" list. Rachel Swan of East Bay Express included it on the "Best Music of 2007" list.

== Track listing ==
No.	Title	Length
1.	"Intro"	1:41
2.	"The Hand That Leads You"	2:32
3.	"The Man to Praise"	3:43
4.	"Legendary Lyricist"	2:41
5.	"Watch Your Step" (featuring Vinnie Paz and Guilty Simpson)	4:04
6.	"Who with Me?"	3:14
7.	"2 Brothers from the Gutter" (featuring Diamond D)	3:13
8.	"Ghetto Rhyme Stories"	3:05
9.	"Throwback Rap Attack"	3:32
10.	"No Time for Jokes" (featuring Chali 2na)	3:50
11.	"Last of the Greats" (featuring Prince Po)	3:15
12.	"BX (Interlude)"	0:42
13.	"Put It on the Line"	3:17
14.	"The Dirt and Filth" (featuring Aesop Rock)	3:32
15.	"LA (Interlude)"	0:32
16.	"Mastered Craftsman"	2:32
17.	"Raw Heat (45 Version)"	3:27
18.	"The Lady Behind Me"	4:05
19.	"Outro"	1:08
Total length:		54:05

== Personnel ==
Credits adapted from liner notes.

- Percee P – vocals
- Madlib – vocals (4), turntables, production, recording, mixing
- Vinnie Paz – vocals (5)
- Guilty Simpson – vocals (5)
- Diamond D – vocals (7)
- Chali 2na – vocals (10)
- Prince Po – vocals (11)
- Aesop Rock – vocals (14)
- J. Rocc – turntables (8, 11)
- Dave Cooley – recording, mixing
- Kelly Hibbert – recording, mixing, mastering
- Jeff Jank – design
- Joao Canziani – photography
- Peanut Butter Wolf – executive production
- Egon – executive production, project coordination, A&R
