= M.E.D. (rapper) =

American rapper

- Also known as: MED; Medaphoar
- Born: Nick Rodriguez; Oxnard, California, U.S.
- Genres: West Coast hip-hop
- Occupation: Rapper
- Years active: 1999–present
- Labels: Stones Throw Records; Bang Ya Head

Nick Rodriguez, better known by his stage name M.E.D. (sometimes stylized as MED), is an American rapper from Oxnard, California. He was formerly known as Medaphoar. He has been signed to Stones Throw Records.

== Life and career ==
Nick Rodriguez grew up in a musical family in Oxnard, California. After being featured on Lootpack's 1999 album Soundpieces: Da Antidote, he was asked by Peanut Butter Wolf to join Stones Throw Records. He was also featured on Quasimoto's The Unseen and Madlib's Shades of Blue.

In 2005, M.E.D. released his debut album, Push Comes to Shove, on Stones Throw Records. It was produced by Madlib, Oh No, J Dilla, and Just Blaze. In 2011, he released his second album, Classic, on Stones Throw Records. It featured contributions from Madlib, Aloe Blacc, Hodgy Beats, Talib Kweli, and Karriem Riggins. In 2014, he released Theme Music, a collaborative album with producer J. Rocc, under the group moniker Axel F. In 2015, he released a collaborative album with Blu and Madlib, titled Bad Neighbor, on Bang Ya Head. It was a follow-up to their 2013 EP, The Burgundy. The trio also released an EP, The Turn Up, in 2017.

== Discography ==
=== Studio albums ===
- Push Comes to Shove (2005)
- Classic (2011)
- Theme Music (2014) (with J. Rocc, as Axel F.)
- Bad Neighbor (2015) (with Blu and Madlib)
- Child of the Jungle (2019) (with Guilty Simpson)
- Flying High (2022) (with Madlib, LMNO, and Declaime as LMD)

=== Mixtapes ===
- Bang Ya Head (2005)
- Bang Ya Head II (2009)
- Bang Ya Head 3 (2010)
- Bang Ya Head 4 (2016)

=== EPs ===
- The Burgundy (2013) (with Blu and Madlib)
- Psychedelic Weather (2015) (with Otakhee)
- The Turn Up (2017) (with Blu and Madlib)
- Loyalty (2018) (with Guilty Simpson)

=== Singles ===
- "In Rhymes We Trust" (2001)
- "Place Your Bet" (2002)
- "Overdue" (2002)
- "What U in It For?" (2003)
- "Push" (2005)
- "Get Back" (2005)
- "Don't Sleep" (2005)
- "100 Dolla Bills" (2009)
- "Where I'm From" / "Classic" (2010)
- "The Buzz" / "Peroxide" (2013) (with Blu and Madlib)
- "Classic (Dexter Remix)" (2014)

=== Guest appearances ===
- Lootpack - "Level Zero", "Wanna Test", and "Episodes" from Soundpieces: Da Antidote (1999)
- Quasimoto - "24-7" from The Unseen (2000)
- Madlib - "Please Set Me at Ease" from Shades of Blue (2003)
- Wildchild - "Knicknack 2002" and "Feel It" from Secondary Protocol (2003)
- Madvillain - "Raid" from Madvillainy (2004) and "FYI" (Unreleased)
- Oh No - "The Ride" from The Disrupt (2004)
- Quasimoto - "The Exclusive" from The Further Adventures of Lord Quas (2005)
- Oh No - "Keep It Lit" from Exodus into Unheard Rhythms (2006)
- J Dilla - "Jungle Love" from The Shining (2006)
- Guilty Simpson - "The Future" from Ode to the Ghetto (2008)
- Gangrene - "Breathing Down Yo Neck" from Gutter Water (2010)
- Quakers - "Fitta Happier" from Quakers (2012)
- Oh No - "Jones's" from Disrupted Ads (2013)
- Blu - "Brown Sugar" from Good to Be Home (2014)
- Lucio Bukowski & Declaime - "Personal History" from Aucun Potentiel Commercial (2017)
- Blu & Oh No - "Boogie to Flex" and "Made the Call" from A Long Red Hot Los Angeles Summer Night (2019)
