= Wildchild (rapper) =

American rapper

- Born: Jack Brown; November 2, 1973 (age 53)
- Origin: Oxnard, California, United States
- Genre: Hip-hop
- Occupation: Rapper
- Years active: 1992–present
- Labels: Stones Throw Records; Fat Beats; SomeOthaShip Connect
- Member of: Lootpack
- Spouse: Cyndee Corral (m. 2001)
- Children: 2, including Miles Brown

Jack Brown, better known by his stage name Wildchild, is an American rapper from Oxnard, California. He is a member of Lootpack.

== Career ==
In 2003, Wildchild released his first solo album, Secondary Protocol, on Stones Throw Records. Produced by Madlib and Oh No, it featured guest appearances from Medaphoar, LMNO, Percee P, Planet Asia, and Aceyalone.

== Personal life ==
Wildchild's son, Miles Brown, is an actor, dancer and rapper.

== Discography ==
=== Albums ===
- Secondary Protocol (2003)
- Jack of All Trades (2007)
- T.G.I.F. (Thank God It's Funky) (2014)
- Omowale (2022)

=== EPs ===
- The Jackal (2004)

=== Singles ===
- "Knicknack 2002" (2002)
- "Code Red" (2003)
- "The Infamous MC & Wildchild - Invisible Riddlez" (2003)
- "Wonder Years" (2004)
- "Fatherhood ft: Big Daddy Kane, Posdnuos, Stacy Epps" (2022)

=== Guest appearances ===
- Quasimoto - "Discipline 99, Pt. 1" from The Unseen (2000)
- Madlib - "Track Two" from Madlib Invazion (2000)
- Kankick - "On the Lookout" from From Artz Unknown (2001)
- BT - "Kimosabe" from Emotional Technology (2003)
- Oh No - "Stomp That, V. 2" and "WTF" from The Disrupt (2004)
- LMNO - "Life Is a Come Up" from Economic Food Chain Music (2004)
- Madvillain - "Hardcore Hustle" from Madvillainy (2004)
- Declaime - "Signs" from Conversations with Dudley (2004)
- Hyper - "This Is a Warning" from We Control (2006)
- Oh No - "Keep It Lit" from Exodus into Unheard Rhythms (2006)
- Foreign Beggars - "Let Go" from Stray Point Agenda (2006)
- Dabrye - "The Stand" from Two/Three (2006)
- Pigeon John - "If You Let It" from Featuring Pigeon John 2 (2007)
- Tr3s Monos - "Amor" from "¿Quién es Simone Staton?" (2007)
- Metro - "Hand in Motion 1" and "Hands in Motion 2" from Hands in Motion (2008)
- Eno.D + Magnificent Ruffians - "Fire" from Firewater (2009)
- Jazz Liberatorz - "After Party (Jazz Lib Remix)" from Fruit of the Past (2009)
- Grems - "MJC" from Sea Sex & Grems (2009)
- A State of Mind - "Root to the Fruit" from Platypus Funk (2010)
- Kyo Itachi - "Super Psycho" from Musikyo (2010)
- B-Doub - "Playin 4 Keeps" from Food for Thought (2010)
- Oh No - "Overload" from Ohnomite (2012)
- Britney Spears - "When I Say So" (unreleased) from Britney (2001)
