= Lootpack =

American hip-hop group

- Origin: Oxnard, California, U.S.
- Genres: Hip-hop, underground hip-hop
- Years active: 1992–present
- Label: Stones Throw
- Spinoff of: Likwit Crew
- Members: Madlib; Wildchild; DJ Romes
- Website: www.stonesthrow.com/artist/lootpack/

Lootpack is an American hip-hop group signed to Stones Throw Records with members Madlib, Wildchild, and DJ Romes. They made their first appearance on the 1993 debut album by Tha Alkaholiks, 21 & Over.

The first vinyl by Lootpack, Ill Psych Move EP, was released in 1996 on a label named Crate Digga's Palace founded by Madlib's father, Otis Jackson Sr. After this 12" they caught the attention of Stones Throw founder Peanut Butter Wolf, producer and DJ. Eventually the three of them signed for Stones Throw leading to their 1999 release of Soundpieces: Da Antidote. A follow-up has not been released, but all three of them have collaborated on other projects and recorded solo records. DJ Romes released the Hamburger Hater Breaks record in 2001, Madlib has produced concept albums as Quasimoto and Yesterdays New Quintet. Wildchild released his debut Secondary Protocol in 2003, entirely produced by Madlib and his younger brother Oh No.

== Discography ==
=== Albums ===
- Soundpieces: Da Antidote Album (1999)
- The Lost Tapes LP (2004)

=== EPs and singles ===
- The Anthem EP 12" (1998)
- "Whenimondamic" 12" Single (1999)
- "Weededed" 12" Single (2000)
- Da Packumentary VHS (2001)
- "On Point"/"Questions Remix" 7" Single (2002)
- "Movies 2 Groupies" Single (2002)
- "Loopdigga EP" (2014)

=== Lootpack on Crate Diggas Palace ===
- Psyche Move EP 12" and CD (1996)
- "Miss Deja Vu" 12" Single (2004)
- The Lost Tapes LP (2004)
