= Ivan Conti =

Brazilian drummer (1946–2023)

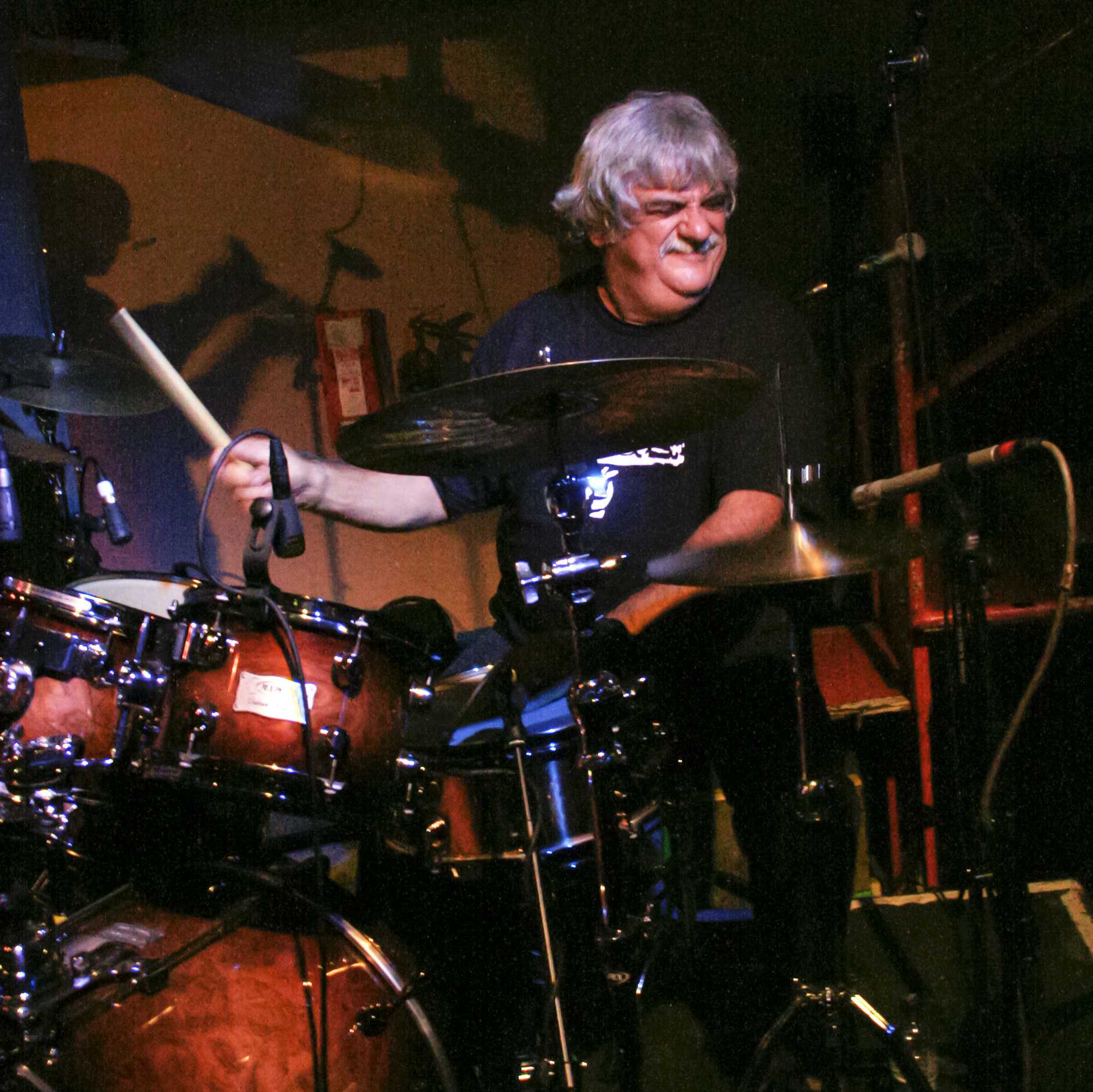
- Conti in 2006

Background information
- Also known as: Mamão
- Born: Ivan Miguel Conti Maranhão; 16 August 1946; Rio de Janeiro, Brazil
- Died: 17 April 2023 (aged 76)
- Genres: Jazz-funk; jazz fusion; bossa nova; MPB
- Instruments: Drums; synthesiser
- Labels: Milestone; Far Out Recordings

Ivan Miguel Conti Maranhão (16 August 1946 – 17 April 2023), also known as Mamão, was a Brazilian drummer, percussionist and composer. He gained prominence as a member of the influential jazz-funk band Azymuth, which he co-founded in 1972.

Conti's career began with performances in bossa nova and rock bands, leading to a role as a session drummer for Odeon Records. As a session musician, he collaborated with artists such as Gal Costa, Roberto Carlos and Jorge Ben. Azymuth gained international recognition in the 1970s and signed with Milestone Records in 1979 with whom they recorded a number of albums. Conti also explored solo ventures and electronic dance music collaborations throughout his career. Known for his unique drumming style, he blended jazz-funk with Brazilian rhythms, contributing to Azymuth's distinctive sound.

== Life and career ==
Conti was born in 1946 in Estácio, Rio de Janeiro. In an interview, Conti said he initially played guitar before switching to drums. As a child, Conti destroyed a papaya tree which led to his nickname Mamão (meaning papaya in Portuguese). Early in his career, he performed in the bossa nova band Os Dissonantes and rock group The Youngsters. During this time, he was hired by Odeon Records as a drummer, which gave Conti his first exposure to professional recording. While Conti was playing in the Youngsters, he met the keyboardist José Roberto Bertrami, who at the time was working with Robertinho Silva and Flora Purim, in a Rio club. In 1972, Bertrami and Conti met bassist Alex Malheiros when he was performing at a bowling alley and soon after formed Azymuth.

Azymuth's first recording was a soundtrack for the 1973 film O Fabuloso Fittipaldi. Conti continued working as a session musician, performing with musicians such as Eumir Deodato, Milton Nascimento, Roberto Carlos, Gal Costa, Maria Bethânia, Raul Seixas, Jorge Ben, Paulinho da Viola, Erasmo Carlos and Chico Buarque. With Azymuth, Conti also performed with Clara Nunes, Belchior, Elis Regina and Tim Maia. In 1977, Azymuth gave a successful performance at Montreux Jazz Festival that led to a US tour the following year and a contract with Milestone Records in 1979. The band recorded a number of albums for Milestone, and, in 1984, Conti released a solo album on the label called The Human Factor. The album made use of electronic drums and synthesisers and was a combination of Brazilian music, popular jazz and funk similar to his work with Azymuth.

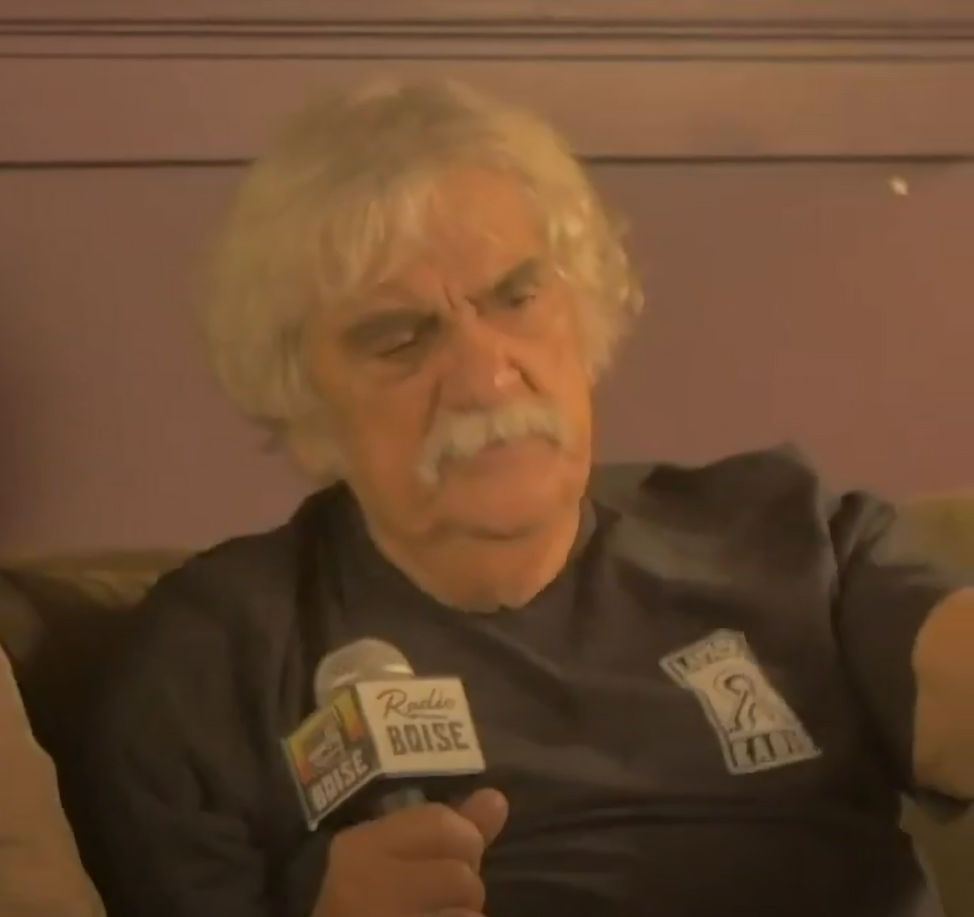
Conti being interviewed in 2019

In 1988, Bertrami left Azymuth, and Conti and Malheiros continued the band alongside Jota Moraes on keyboard. The band eventually departed Milestone and began releasing records on the British record label Far Out Recordings. Bertrami occasionally performed with Azymuth during the 1990s, though by this time the peak of the band's popularity had passed. Conti continued to perform with Azymuth following Bertrami's death in 2012 with Kiko Continentino taking on the role of keyboardist.

In the early 2000s, Conti joined the reformed line-up of the 1960s samba-canção band Os Ipanemas along with his son Thiago. Conti started collaborating with DJs on electronic dance music in the mid-2000s, including Jazzanova. With hip-hop producer Madlib, Conti released the album Sujinho in 2008 under the name Jackson Conti. In 2019, Conti released Poison Fruit, his first solo album in 22 years. In an interview, Conti explained that he recorded the album almost entirely alone with the exception of some assistance from his son. The album also features his Azymuth bandmates. Poison Fruit featured elements of samba, house, jungle, EDM, techno, jazz and batucada.

Conti died on 17 April 2023. Following his death, musicians such as Nascimento, Marcelo D2 and Emicida published messages of condolence. At the time of his death, he was working on a new album.

== Playing style ==
Conti is often regarded one of the greatest drummers in Brazilian music. He said that his drumming influences included Gene Krupa, Buddy Rich, Max Roach, Joe Morello, Steve Gadd and Billy Cobham, as well as fellow Brazilians Milton Nascimento, Wilson das Neves, Robertinho Silva and Hélcio Milito. With Azymuth, Conti developed a style called samba doido (crazy samba in English), which is a mixture of jazz-funk and the rhythms of Brazilian music and was influenced by the work of Krupa, Bill Evans and Scott LaFaro. Conti's Latin percussion and rhythms played a large part in defining Azymuth's unique sound. His skill and innovative approach to percussion has been compared to Tony Allen amongst others.

== Awards ==
- Brazilian Music Award for Best Instrumentalist, 1997
- Ordem do Mérito Cultural, 2011

== Discography ==
- The Human Factor (1984, Milestone)
- Batida Diferente (1992, Maracatu)
- Pulsar (1999, CID)
- Poison Fruit (2019, Far Out Recordings)

With Azymuth

- O Fabuloso Fittipaldi (1973, Philips)
- Azimüth (1975, Som Livre)
- Aguia Não Come Mosca (1977, Atlantic)
- Light as a Feather (1979, Black Sun)
- Outubro (1979, Black Sun)
- Telecommunication (1982, Milestone)
- Cascades (1982, Milestone)
- Rapid Transit (1983, Milestone)
- Flame (1984, Milestone)
- Spectrum (1985. Milestone)
- Tightrope Walker (1986, Milestone)
- Crazy Rhythm (1987, Milestone)
- Carioca (1988, Milestone)
- Carumim (1990, Intima)
- Pieces Of Ipanema (1999, Far Out Recordings)
- Azymuth JID004 (2020, Jazz is Dead)

With Jackson Conti

- Sujinho (2008, Mochilla)

With Os Ipanemas

- Afro Bossa (2003, Far Out Recordings)
- Call of the Gods (2008, Far Out Recordings)

As sideman

- Eumir Deodato, Os Catedraticos 73 (1973, Equipe)
- Erasmo Carlos, Sonhos e Memórias 1941 - 1972 (1971, Polydor)
- Marcos Valle, Previsão do Tempo (1972, Odeon)
- Mark Murphy, Night Moods (1986, Milestone)
- Ron Trent, What Do the Stars Say to You (2022, Night Time Stories)
