= Braziliana =

Braziliana may refer to:

- Things to do with Brazil
- Braziliana, Ballet-musical from Rio de Janeiro 1953 in music
- Braziliana (album), by Luiz Bonfa and his wife Maria Toledo 1965
- Braziliana, album by Manfredo Fest
- Maenola braziliana
