= Alucinação =

Studio album by Belchior
- Released: June 1976
- Recorded: 1976
- Studios: Phonogram Studios, Rio de Janeiro
- Genres: Blues; MPB; Folk Rock
- Length: 37:25
- Label: Philips
- Producer: Marco Mazzola

Belchior studio albums chronology
Belchior (1974)	Alucinação (1976)	Coração Selvagem (1977)

Alucinação (Brazilian Portuguese: [alusinaˈsɐ̃w̃]) is a 1976 studio album by Brazilian singer-songwriter Belchior. Recorded at Phonogram (current Universal Music), it is the singer's second album. It features hit songs like "Apenas um Rapaz Latino-Americano", "Como Nossos Pais" and "Velha Roupa Colorida". The album sold 30,000 copies in a single month, and more than 500,000 copies in total.

The album cover is a picture of the singer taken by photographer Januário Garcia, from an angle that according to him has no special reason. The light and color effects were obtained with the Sabattier effect.

== Reception ==
Renato de Moraes, writing for Folha de S. Paulo, praised Belchior's album for its novelty: without the influence of concretist poetry in his lyrics, the singer's album impresses more for its extensive narrative lyrics, in the style of Bob Dylan. Also praised is the solid sound base of the album, which is divided between blues, country, baião and rock. O Globo's Sérgio Cabral criticized Belchior's fixation for the new, saying that everything on his record – his anarchism, his contradictions and his references to May 1968 – is old. He concluded that the album was a "waste of talent". Nelson Motta, also writing for O Globo, did not agree with his colleague and praised Belchior's work precisely for his exploration of the senses of "newness", as well as for the production of Marco Mazzola and for the musicians performances.

== Legacy ==
Josely Teixeira Carlos, radio broadcaster, professor and researcher at the University of São Paulo says that "this record sums up the feeling of an entire Brazilian generation, coming from the countryside to the middle of the big city."

For singer and songwriter Khalil Gibran, Alucinação was the most revolutionary album in the history of MPB and one of the most important of all times for Brazilian music, which even after several years of its release, several songs still echo by radio, TV shows and re-recordings in all parts of Brazil. The newspaper O Globo reaffirms this thought by explaining that "this masterpiece of the singer and composer contains songs that expressed the urgency of the young Brazilian between the state violence and the end of dreams of freedom."

According to Correio 24 Horas, "the album has become an instant classic that has crossed generations. In ten tracks, the cearense singer reports his anguish in front of the big city and the decline of the hippie dream, with irony and a little bitterness."

According to Veja magazine, "in the singer's trajectory, Alucinação is the fundamental record. Considered one of the greatest albums of Brazilian music, it is wrapped in disenchantment, a feeling translated into Como Nossos Pais, which reached even greater projection in the voice of Elis Regina ".

== Tracks ==
All tracks are written by Belchior.

A side
No.	Title	Length
1.	"Apenas um Rapaz Latino-Americano"	4:17
2.	"Velha Roupa Colorida"	4:49
3.	"Como Nossos Pais"	4:41
4.	"Sujeito de Sorte"	3:56
5.	"Como o Diabo Gosta"	2:33

B side
No.	Title	Length
1.	"Alucinação"	4:52
2.	"Não Leve Flores"	4:11
3.	"À Palo Seco"	2:56
4.	"Fotografia 3x4"	5:27
5.	"Antes do Fim"	0:59
Total length:		37:25

== Credits ==
- Producer: Marco Mazzola
- Recording technician: Ary Carvalhaes
- Recording assistant: Paulo Sérgio (Chocô)
- Studio assistant: Rafael Azulay
- Mixing technician: Mazzola
- Montage: Jairo Gualberto
- Cutting: Joaquim Figueira
- Art director: Aldo Luiz
- Layout: Nilo de Paula
- Photography: Januário Garcia
- Vocals: Belchior, Evinha, Maritza and Regina
- Classical guitar: Belchior and Antenor Gandra
- Electric guitar: Antenor Gandra
- Viola caipira: Antenor Gandra, Rick Ferreira (track 10) and Lui (track 5)
- Pedal steel: Rick Ferreira (track 7)
- Piano, Pipe organ, Synthesizer, ARP String Ensemble and Arrangement: José Roberto Bertrami
- Harmonica: Lui (tracks 1 e 10)
- Accordion: Orlando Silveira (track 7)
- Bass: Paulo César Barros
- Percussion: Ariovaldo Contesini
- Drums: Pedrinho Batera
