= What Do the Stars Say to You =

Studio album by Ron Trent
- Released: 24 June 2022
- Genre: House, jazz-funk, quiet storm, sophisti-pop, new-age, new wave, kosmische, Balearic, samba, afrobeat, Latin rock, soft rock
- Label: Night Time Stories
- Producer: Ron Trent

Ron Trent chronology
Raw Footage (2011)	What Do the Stars Say to You (2022)

What Do the Stars Say to You is a studio album by American house producer Ron Trent, released by Night Time Stories on June 24, 2022. Released under his new project WARM, What Do the Stars Say to You is his first LP since Raw Footage, which was released in 2011.

The album features collaborations with Khruangbin, Gigi Masin, Azymuth's Ivan Conti and Alex Malheriros, Jean-Luc Ponty, Venecia, and Lars Bartkuhn.

== Critical reception ==
Pitchfork's Ben Cardew gave the album a 7.2 rating out of 10, describing it as "a record of gentle rewards, gradual discovery." The Arts Desk's Barney Harsent rated the album four out of five stars, calling it "a smooth-as-silk success." Oscar Henson rated the album eight out of ten in his review for Crack magazine, saying, "What Do the Stars Say to You is the sound of a modern master putting his mark on the music that raised him." Resident Advisor's Annabel Ross called it "an album of deep, relaxing grooves that sparkle with expert musicianship."

== Track listing ==
=== Vinyl ===
- A1. "Cool Water" feat. Ivan Conti (Azymuth) and Lars Bartkuhn
- A2. "Cycle of Many"
- A3. "Admira" feat. Gigi Masin
- A4. "Flowers" feat. Venecia
- A5. "Melt Into You" feat. Alex Malheiros (Azymuth)
- B1. "Flos Potentia (Sugar, Cotton, Tabacco)" feat. Khruangbin
- B2. "Sphere" feat. Jean-Luc Ponty
- B3. "WARM"
- B4. "On My Way Home"
- B5. "What Do the Stars Say to You"

=== CD ===
The CD contains a continuous mix by François Kevorkian, which includes five bonus tracks:

1. "Melt Into You" feat. Alex Malheiros (Azymuth)
2. "Cool Water" feat. Ivan Conti (Azymuth) and Lars Bartkuhn
3. "Flos Potentia (Sugar, Cotton, Tabacco)" feat. Khruangbin
4. "The Ride"
5. "Cycle of Many"
6. "In the Summer When We Were Young"
7. "Flowers" feat. Venecia
8. "Sphere" feat. Jean-Luc Ponty
9. "Admira" feat. Gigi Masin
10. "Endless Love"
11. "Rocking You"
12. "WARM"
13. "On My Way Home"
14. "What Do the Stars Say to You"
15. "Cool Water Interlude"

== Personnel ==
- Ron Trent – drums, percussion, keys, synths, piano, guitar and electronics
- François K – mastering

== External sources ==
- What Do the Stars Say to You at Night Time Stories
