= Jacarandá (Luiz Bonfá album) =

Studio album by Luiz Bonfá
- Released: September 1973
- Genre: Jazz fusion; Brazilian jazz
- Length: 46:57
- Label: Ranwood; R-8112 LP

Luiz Bonfá chronology
Introspection (1972)	Jacarandá (1973)	Bonfá Burrows Brazil (1978)

Jacarandá is a studio album by Brazilian guitarist Luiz Bonfá, released by Ranwood Records in September 1973.

== Reception ==
The AllMusic review by Thom Jurek stated, "This is one of the most disciplined and ambitions recordings to be issued during that decade. Here, Bonfá's gorgeous palette of samba and bossa melodies is married to film score dynamics, lush romantic cadenzas, smoking jazz grooves and cultured extrapolations of folk and popular music schemas, creating a stunning mosaic of color, release, pastoral elegance and bad-ass, intoxicating, polyrhythmic Latin soul vistas."

Sputnikmusic wrote, "[it] certainly isn't the only of its kind, but it has stood as the crowning achievement of Luiz Bonfa, and with an artist as accomplished as him, that's no small feat."

Professional ratings
Review scores
Source	Rating
AllMusic	4.5/5 stars
Sputnikmusic	5/5 stars

== Track listing ==
All tracks are written by Luiz Bonfá except where noted.

Side one
No.	Title	Writer(s)	Length
1.	"Apache Talk"		5:21
2.	"Jacarandá"		4:09
3.	"The Gentle Rain"		5:34
4.	"You or Not to Be"	Octavio Burnier	2:30
5.	"Strange Message"		3:27

Side two
No.	Title	Writer(s)	Adapted by	Length
1.	"Don Quixote"			3:29
2.	"Song Thoughts"			3:25
3.	"Danse V" ("Danse No. 5")	Enrique Granados	Bonfá	6:47
4.	"Empty Room"			6:54
5.	"Sun Flower"			5:21
Total length:				46:57

- In 1998, the album was re-sequenced and rereleased, with a new track listing: "Apache Talk" (1), "Empty Room" (2), "The Gentle Rain" (3), "Danse No. 5" (4), "Song Thoughts" (5), "You or Not to Be" (6), "Don Quixote" (7), "Strange Message" (8), "Jacarandá" (9), "Sun Flower" (10)

== Personnel ==
Musicians

- Luiz Bonfá – acoustic guitar (six-string and twelve-string), arranger and conductor (1.2, 2.1, 2.2)
- Eumir Deodato – piano, electric piano, synthesizer, arranger and conductor (1.1, 1.3–1.5, 2.3–2.5)
- Maria Helena Toledo, Sonia Burnier – background vocals
- Phil Bordner – flute (solos), clarinet, oboe, cor anglais
- Jerry Dodgion – flute, alto saxophone
- Romeo Penque – flute, bass clarinet, baritone saxophone
- Sonny Boyer – tenor saxophone
- James Buffington, Peter Gordon – French horn
- Burt Collins, John Frosk, Irvin "Marky" Markowitz – trumpet
- Randy Brecker, Marvin Stamm – trumpet, flugelhorn
- Wayne Andre, Garnett Brown, Bill Watrous – trombone
- Tony Studd – bass trombone
- Harry Lookofsky – concert master, violin
- Harry Cykman, Max Ellen, Paul Gershman, Emanuel Green, Harry Katzman, Harold Kohon, Joseph Malin, David Nadien, Gene Orloff, Elliot Rosoff, Irving Spice – violin
- Alfred Brown, Selwart Clark, Harold Colleta, Emanuel Vardi – viola
- Gloria Lanzarone, Charles McCracken, George Ricci, Alan Shulman – cello
- Alvin Brehm, Russ Savakus – orchestral bass
- John Tropea – electric guitar
- John Wood – electric piano (1.2, 1.3)
- Mark Drury – double bass (1.1, 1.2, 2.1)
- Stanley Clarke – electric bass
- Ray Barretto – congas
- Airto Moreira – percussion
- Idris Muhammad, Richard O'Connell (1.2) – drums

Technical

- Luiz Bonfá – producer, photography (cover)
- John Wood – producer, liner notes
- Ray Hal, Bob Simpson, Kerry McNabb – recording engineer
- Alfred Brown – strings contractor
- Maria Helena Toledo – additional photography (photo used for reissue cover)

1998 CD reissue

- Arnaldo DeSouteiro – reissue producer, remix engineer, liner notes, art direction
- Mike Henderson – remix engineer
- Rodrigo de Castro Lopes – remastering
- Studio Five – graphics
