= Night Mood: The Music of Ivan Lins =

1987 studio album by Mark Murphy

Studio album by Mark Murphy
- Released: 1987
- Recorded: 1986
- Studio: Fantasy Studios
- Genre: Vocal jazz
- Length: 43:15
- Label: Milestone
- Producer: Richard Bock

Mark Murphy chronology
Beauty and the Beast (1986)	Night Mood: The Music of Ivan Lins (1987)	September Ballads (1988)

Night Mood: The Music of Ivan Lins is a 1987 studio album by Mark Murphy.

Night Mood: The Music of Ivan Lins is the 25th studio album by American jazz vocalist Mark Murphy. It was recorded in 1986 when Murphy was 54 years old and released by the Milestone label in the United States in 1987. The album is a collection of Brazilian jazz standards by Ivan Lins recorded with Azymuth, a Brazilian trio signed to Milestone, and guests Claudio Roditi and Frank Morgan.

== Background ==
Murphy had a passion for Brazilian songs throughout his career and recorded his first all-Brazilian jazz album, Brazil Song (Cancões Do Brasil) in 1983 soon after visiting Rio. Night Mood was the first US album devoted entirely to Ivan Lins. "Sails" and "Madalena" would become frequent numbers in Murphy's live sets. "Madalena" had been a hit for Elis Regina from her album Madalena (1970). Murphy introduced the English lyrics not heard anywhere else. This record was Murphy's first release for Milestone Records. Jazz saxophonist Frank Morgan, who has an extended solo on "Love Dance", was in the process of re-building his career in the 1980s, recovering from addiction and prison sentences. Murphy had recorded "Love Dance" previously in a duet with Blossom Dearie on Chez Whalberg Part One (Daffodil, 1985).

== Recording ==
To capture authentic Brazilian jazz, Murphy enlists the Brazilian trio Azymuth with arrangements by their keyboardist, José Roberto Bertrami. Bertrami plays piano on "Ticket", "Believe What I Say" and "Mãos De Afeto" and synthesizer on the remaining tracks. Alex Malheiros is on electric bass and Ivan Conti (Mamão) is on drums and percussion. Brazilian musician Claudio Roditi accompanies on trumpet and flugelhorn on all but 2 tracks. Roditi would also join Murphy on his 1994 recording I'll Close My Eyes. Frank Morgan, an American born in Minneapolis, Minnesota, plays saxophone on six tracks. Larry Dunlap, who would go on to produce, arrange and play piano on Murphy's 1988 September Ballads (Milestone Records), here contributes English lyrics to "Ticket (Bilhete)" and "Before We Lose Tomorrow (Antes Que Seja Tarde)".

Noted Pacific Jazz founder Richard Bock produced the album, his only one with Murphy. Bock produced hundreds of jazz recordings. Manager Lupe DeLeon, who was also involved with Murphy's Stolen Moments and September Ballads, was co-producer.

In the liner notes Bob Blumenthal points out that American lyricists tend to take a gentler, less bitter view of Brazilian saudade. Murphy tries to capture the melancholic feeling of incompleteness that is saudade, whether singing in English or Portuguese, as in "Mãos De Afeto". Blumenthal writes, "There is a distinctly different feeling, for example, to Larry Dunlop's "Ticket," where the narrator evicts himself instead of the lover. It is to Murphy's credit that he remains totally faithful to both the original intent and what in this case is a compelling English-language variant". "Ticket" is performed as a duet with José Roberto Bertrami on piano.

Professional ratings
Review scores
Source	Rating
AllMusic	4/5 stars
The Virgin Encyclopedia of Popular Music	3/5 stars
The Rolling Stone Jazz & Blues Album Guide	4/5 stars
The Penguin Guide to Jazz on Compact Disc,	2.5/4 stars
Musichound Jazz: The Essential Album Guide	4.5/5 stars

== Reception ==
Scott Yanow assigns the album 4 stars for AllMusic. He writes, "Murphy (54 at the time) is heard in fine voice on the mostly unfamiliar material, faring quite well even though the style is different than one would expect from the singer". In his book The Jazz Singers: The Ultimate Guide, Yanow includes the album in his list of "other worthy recordings of the past 20 years" by Murphy.

Colin Larkin assigns 3 stars to the album in The Virgin Encyclopedia of Popular Music. (3 stars means, "Good. By the artist's usual standards and therefore recommended").

The Rolling Stone Jazz & Blues Album Guide assigned the album 4 stars (meaning, "Excellent: Four-star albums represent peak performances in an artist's career. Generally speaking, albums that are granted four or more stars constitute the best introductions to an artist's work for listeners who are curious").

In The Penguin Guide to Jazz on Compact Disc, Cook and Martin assign the album 3 qualified stars, **(*) (meaning, "Worthwhile things here, but some significant flaws in either performance or presentation tell against it. Maybe for completists of the artist in question only"). They write, "Night Mood and September Ballads both set him up with a light fusion of jazz and Latin rhythms (the group Azymuth back him on the former) and, although his singing is as accomplished as usual, the thin material on Night Mood is discouraging".

In his book A Biographical Guide to the Great Jazz and Pop Singers, Will Friedwald said, "When it comes to bossa nova, no other American jazz singer can touch Murphy...His great service to Braziliana was Night Mood, probably the first full-length songbook by an American jazzer of the music of Ivan Lins, including English text to "Magdalena" not heard anywhere else".

Christ Albertson writing for Stereo Review calls the release "a well-honed set" and says, "The years have added a bit of gravel to Murphy's voice, but it is quite becoming. As with so many other cabaret singers, it's the delivery that counts". He rates the performance as "Right mood" and the recording as "Very good".

MusicHound Jazz assigns the release 4.5 bones (i.e. 4.5 stars). The review praises Murphy and the release, "A true student of Brazilian music, Murphy recorded a beautiful album of Ivan Lins tunes for Milestone, Night Mood".

== Track listing ==
1. "Nightmood (Lembra)" (Ivan Lins, Vítor Martins, David Richardson) – 4:50
2. "Madalena" (Lins, Ronaldo Monteiro de Souza, L. Galt) – 3:57
3. "Ticket (Bilhete)" (Lins, Martins, Larry Dunlap) – 4:04
4. "Dinorah Dinorah" (Lins, Martins) – 5:30
5. "Before We Lose Tomorrow (Antes Que Seja Tarde)" (Lins, Martins, Dunlap) – 3:50
6. "Sails (Velas Içadas)" (Lins, Martins, Gene Lees) – 5:20
7. "Love Dance (Lembrança)" (Lins, Gilson Peranzzetta, Paul Williams) – 5:53
8. "Mãos De Afeto" (Lins, Martins) – 5:16
9. "Believe What I Say (Daquio Que Eu Sei)" (Lins, Martins, Patti Austin) – 4:35

== Personnel ==
Performance

- Mark Murphy – vocals
- Azymuth – trio:
  - Alex Malheiros – electric bass, background vocals
  - José Roberto Bertrami – keyboards, piano, arranger
  - Ivan Conti (Mamão) – drums, percussion
- Frank Morgan – alto saxophone (tracks 1, 4, 6–9)
- Claudio Roditi – trumpet, flugelhorn (tracks 1–2, 4–6, 8–9)

Production

- Danny Kopelson – engineer, recorded at Fantasy Studios 1986
- Cindy Lewis – photography
- Richard Bock – producer
- Lupe DeLeon – associate producer
- George Horn – mastering
- Bob Blumenthal – liner notes
- Phil Carroll – art direction
- Eddie O'Sullivan – photography (landscape rear sleeve on LP release)
