= Sujinho =

Studio album by Jackson Conti
- Released: April 2008
- Recorded: 2007–2008
- Genre: Latin jazz, funk, samba
- Length: 72:57
- Label: Kindred Spirits (Netherlands); Mochilla (US)
- Producer: Madlib, Ivan Conti

Madlib chronology
Perseverance (2007)	Sujinho (2008)	Madvillainy 2 (2008)

Sujinho is a Latin jazz collaboration album between Otis Jackson Jr., an American hip-hop producer and MC known as Madlib, and Ivan Conti, drummer for the Brazilian funk band Azymuth. This album features Brazilian samba music and Latin Jazz, one of Madlib's interests (he had covered Azymuth's "Papa" on Yesterdays New Quintet's Angles Without Edges in 2001.) Sujinho has been released twice, once in the Netherlands on Kindred Spirits in 2x vinyl and in the US on Mochilla Records in CD format.

== Track listing ==
Vinyl 1

- Side A
1. "Mamaoism" - 00:32
2. "Berumba" (Luiz Eça & Bebeto) - 03:47
3. "Anna de Amsterdam (Interlude)" - 00:18
4. "Praca da Republica" - 04:02
5. "Papaia" (Alex Malheiros) - 10:03
- Side B
1. "Brazilian Sugar" - 06:27
2. "São Paulo Nights" - 04:21
3. "Xibaba" (Airto Moreira)- 04:51
4. "Upa Neguinho"(Edu Lobo / Gianfrancesco Guarnieri) - 04:14

Vinyl 2

- Side C
1. "Casa Forte"(Edu Lobo) - 03:51
2. "Amazon Stroll" - 04:30
3. "Berimbau"(Baden Powell / Vinicius de Moraes) - 05:15
4. "Anna de Amsterdam (Reprise)" - 00:27
5. "Waiting On The Corner"(Humberto Teixeira & Sivuca) - 05:01
- Side D
1. "Tijuca Man" - 02:38
2. "Nao Tem Nada Nao"(Marcos Valle) - 03:36
3. "Sunset At Sujinho" - 01:55
4. "Segura Esta Onda" - 07:01
