= Luiz Bonfá Plays and Sings Bossa Nova =

Luiz Bonfá Composer of Black Orpheus Plays and Sings Bossa Nova

Studio album by Luiz Bonfá
- Released: 1963
- Recorded: December 1962; New York City, U.S.
- Genre: Bossa nova
- Length: 43:16
- Label: Verve; V-8522

Luiz Bonfá chronology
Bossa Nova no Carnegie Hall (1962)	Luiz Bonfá Composer of Black Orpheus Plays and Sings Bossa Nova (1963)	Le Ore dell'amore (1962)

Luiz Bonfá Composer of Black Orpheus Plays and Sings Bossa Nova is a 1962 studio album by Brazilian guitarist Luiz Bonfá, arranged by Lalo Schifrin.

Professional ratings
Review scores
Source	Rating
AllMusic	4/5 stars

== Track listing ==
1. "Samba de Duas Notas (Two Note Samba)" – 2:45
2. "Vem Só (Come Here, My Love)" – 1:57
3. "Sambalamento" – 2:17
4. "Tristeza (Brazilian Blues)" – 3:02
5. "Manhã De Carnaval (Morning of the Carnival)" – 3:18
6. "Silêncio Do Amor (The Silence of Love)" – 2:07
7. "Domingo a Noite (Sunday Night)" – 2:00
8. "Ilha de Coral (Coral Island)" – 3:21
9. "Adeus (Goodbye)" – 3:22
10. "Quebra Mar (The Sea Wall)" – 2:27
11. "Amor Que Acabou (The End of Love)" – 2:04
12. "Chora Tua Tristeza (Cry Your Blues Away)" – 3:04
13. "Bossa Nova Cha Cha" – 3:20

== Personnel ==
Musicians

- Luiz Bonfá – guitar, vocals
- Maria Helena Toledo – vocals
- Leo Wright – flute
- Oscar Castro-Neves – piano, electric organ, guitar
- Iko Castro-Neves – double bass
- Roberto Pontes-Dias – drums, percussion
- Lalo Schifrin – arranger

Technical

- Jim Marshall – photography
