= Hélcio Milito =

Brazilian jazz samba/bossa nova drummer

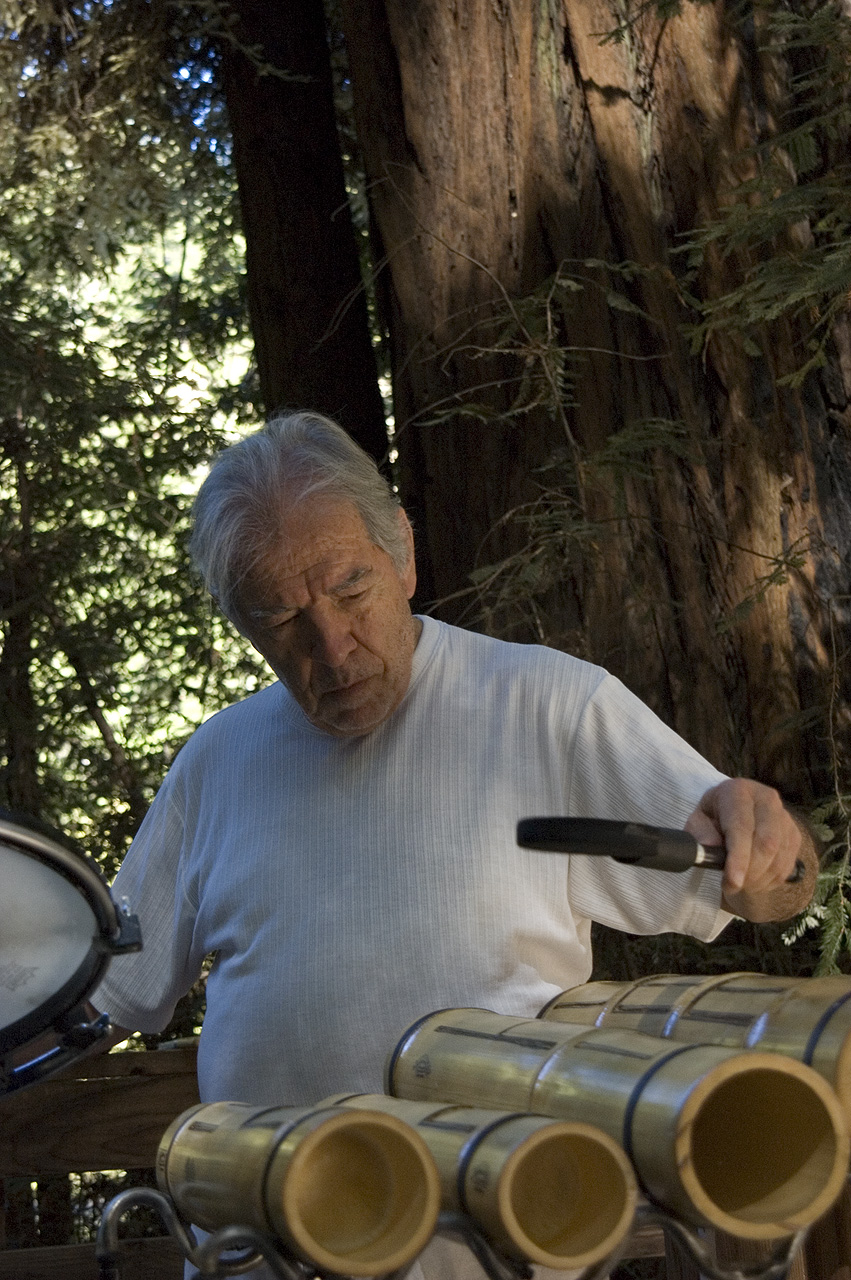
Brazilian jazz percussionist Helcio Milito

Hélcio Paschoal Milito (born February 4, 1931 - died June 7, 2014) was a Brazilian jazz samba/bossa nova drummer who has worked with musicians like Luiz Bonfá, João Gilberto, Astrud Gilberto, Aparecida, and Luíz Eça. He has also helped make film scores for several Brazilian movies. He has been known to perform in several Latin music mediums, including Choro.

== See also ==
- Mário Negrão
