= Braziliana (album) =

Studio album by Luiz Bonfá and Maria Toledo
- Released: 1965
- Genre: Bossa nova
- Length: 35:07
- Label: Philips
- Producer: Bobby Scott

Braziliana is a 1965 album by Brazilian guitarist Luiz Bonfá and his wife, singer Maria Toledo, of songs mainly composed by Bonfá and Toledo, produced by Bobby Scott. The backing musicians included drummers Hélcio Milito and Dom Um Romão. Stereo Review accorded it a Recording of Special Merit. The album was recorded after the success of the 1964 Getz/Gilberto album, and increased interest in samba and bossa nova in Europe. After being out of print for many years the LP was reissued as CD in the Verve Originals series in 2008.

== Track listing ==
A1 "Whistle samba" – Bonfá with Toledo (vocalise – no lyrics)
A2 "Tanto amor" – Bonfá, Reinaldo Dias Leme
A3 "Samba de Orfeu" – Bonfá, lyrics Antonio Maria
A4 "Pierrot" – Bonfá Toledo
A5 "Boticario" – Bonfá Toledo
A6 "Cavaquinho" – Bonfá Toledo
A7 "Improviso" – Bonfá Toledo
B1 "Promessa" – Bonfá Toledo
B2 "Sugar Loaf" – Bonfá
B3 "Saudade" – Bonfá Toledo
B4 "Guanabara" – Bonfá
B5 "Pequeno olhar" – Bonfá Toledo
B6 "Baroco" – Bonfá Toledo
B7 "Sambura" – Bonfá Toledo

== Personnel ==
- Hélcio Milito - first drummer
- Doum - second drummer
