= Introspection (Luiz Bonfá album) =

Studio album by Luiz Bonfá
- Released: 1972
- Recorded: 1972
- Studio: RCA Studios A, B, and C, NYC
- Genre: Bossa nova; classical
- Length: 26:27
- Label: RCA International; FSP-297 LP
- Producer: Pete Spargo

Luiz Bonfá chronology
Sanctuary (1971)	Introspection (1972)	Jacarandá (1973)

Introspection is an instrumental studio album by Brazilian guitarist Luiz Bonfá, recorded in 1972 and released by RCA International that same year. It features eight of Bonfá's compositions played on solo guitar.

Prior to Introspection, in 1970, Bonfá signed with RCA Records, releasing The New Face of Bonfá and Sanctuary in the United States. These two albums did not achieve the expected commercial success, and anticipating that a third release would be his last with the label, he decided to take an even more experimental approach.

== Reception ==
Professional ratings
Review scores
Source	Rating
AllMusic	5/5 stars

AllMusic's Thom Jurek stated, "almost no Bonfá recording reaches the dizzying – if gently stated – heights of his art the way Introspection does. [...] There is deep emotion in each track, portrayed by his elegantly articulated phrasing in spare passages of warm, haunting, sometimes somber, always deeply romantic poetic imagery. [...] Bonfá's guitar embodies the whole of not only Brazilian tradition, but also jazz and classical music as well. These compositions sing; they carry the fire and intervallic dimensionality of improvisation and intricacies and subtleties of song."

Forced Exposure considered the album "one of Luiz Bonfá's finest and most accomplished recordings", continuing that it "reveals a rare intimacy, great precision, and intense emotional depth. Bonfá's virtuosity shines through in every note, blending classical technique with Brazilian rhythm with profound expressiveness."

Jazzwise called it "a clever piece of multi-tracked playing".

TV Cultura wrote that the music of Introspection had an "even more experimental approach, with material that the guitarist himself defined as 'descriptive-impressionistic,' in the style of Debussy and Ravel".

== Track listing ==
All tracks are written by Luiz Bonfá.

No.	Title	Length
1.	"Enchanted Mirror"	3:59
2.	"Summertime Love"	3:00
3.	"Reflections"	2:42
4.	"Concerto for Guitar"	3:15
5.	"Rain"	2:40
6.	"Leque"	1:49
7.	"Missal (Estudo)"	3:45
8.	"Adventure in Space"	5:17
Total length:		26:27

== Personnel ==
- Luiz Bonfá – acoustic guitar, twelve-string guitar, effects pedals
- Pete Spargo – producer
- Ray Hall – recording engineer
- Tom Paisley – liner notes
- Acy Lehman – art direction
- Don Ivan Punchatz – cover illustration

2001 CD Reissue

- Arnaldo DeSouteiro – reissue producer, re-editing, liner notes, text
- Carlinhos Freitas – remastering
- Adriana Ramos – general coordination
- Aline Dantas – coordination
