= Sabrina Malheiros =

Brazilian MPB singer/songwriter (born 1979)

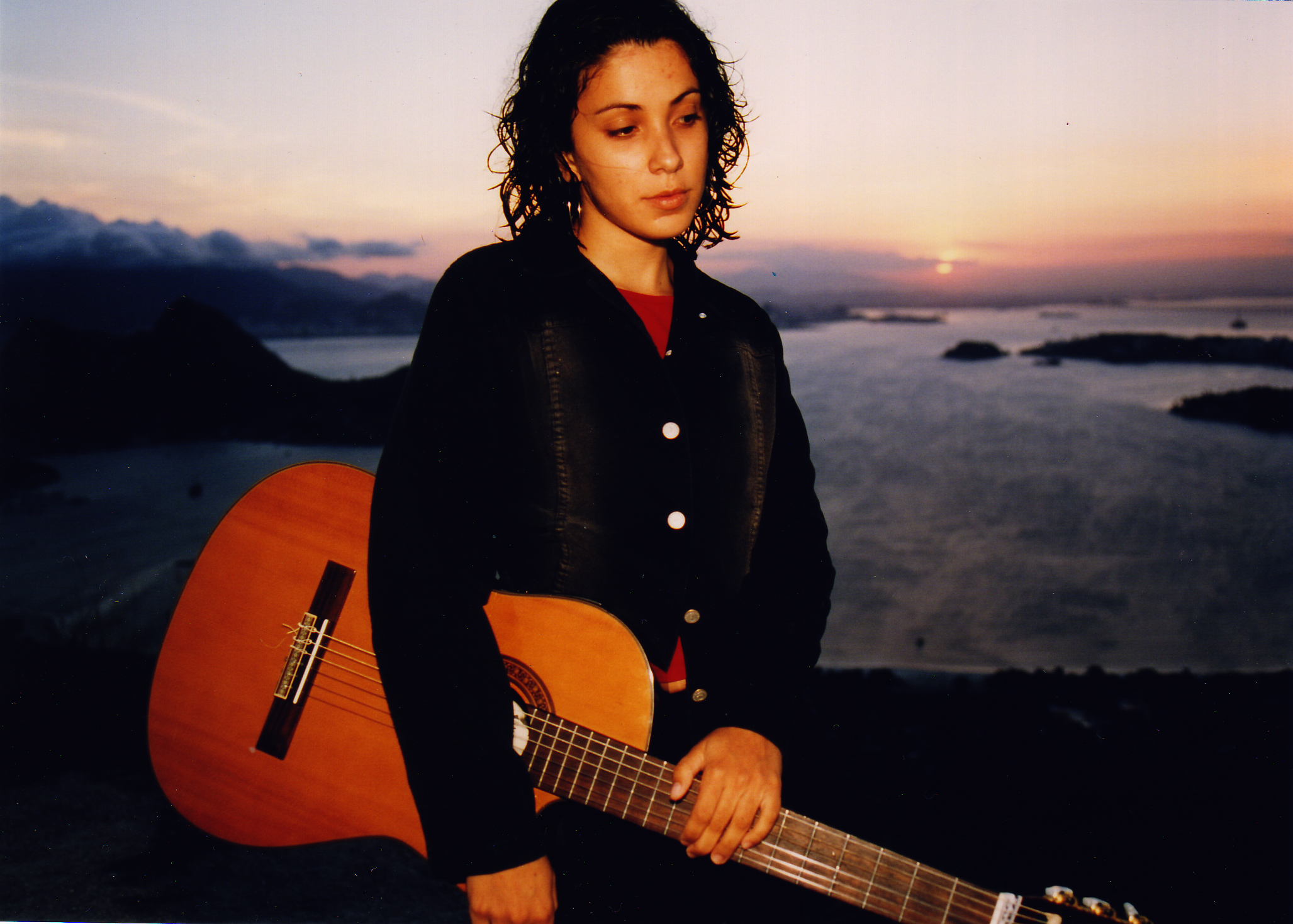
Sabrina Malheiros

Sabrina Malheiros (born 1979) is a Brazilian música popular brasileira (MPB) singer/songwriter. Her music has been described as "nu bossa", combining house beats with jazz and samba influences and "cool, detached-sounding vocals", and critics have compared her to Brazilian contemporaries Bebel Gilberto and Céu.

== Biography ==
Malheiros was born in the city of Rio de Janeiro. She is the daughter of Azymuth bassist Alex Malheiros. She was interested in music from a young age, enrolled in music school at age six, and made her first studio recording before age seven. She cites Azymuth and João Gilberto as early influences on her musical style.

Malheiros's first commercially distributed recording was the title track of Azymuth's 1991 album Curumim, on which she sang lead vocals. Her debut album, Equilibria, was released in 2005. Malheiros wrote or co-wrote nine tracks on the album. Her second album, New Morning, was released in 2008 and was arranged by Arthur Verocai. Both albums were produced by Daniel Maunick and released on the Far Out Recordings label. A remastered and partially reworked "Deluxe Edition" of New Morning was released in 2009, containing a few extra tracks and an increased emphasis on instrumentation.

Originally released on CD in 2005, Equilibria was released on vinyl for the first time in April 2025, through Far Out Recordings as a limited Gold Vinyl edition for Record Store Day, coinciding with the album’s 20th anniversary.

Malheiros made her UK concert debut on 18 May 2005 at Jazz Cafe in London.

== Discography ==
=== Albums ===
- 2005: Equilibria
- 2006: Vibrasons
- 2008: New Morning
- 2009: New Morning (Deluxe Edition)
- 2011: Dreaming
- 2017: Clareia
- 2025: Equilibria (Limited Edition Gold Vinyl - First Pressing)

=== Singles and EPs ===
- 2003 – Iemanjá (The Female Water Spirit) (12") Remix
- 2004 – Estação Verão (Kenny Dope Remixes) (12") Remix
- 2005 – Equilibria (Álbum Sampler) (12") Remix
- 2005 – Maracatueira (Incognito Remixes) (12") Remix
- 2005 – Passa / Capoeira Vai (12") Remix
- 2006 – Terra De Ninguém (Nicola Conte Rework) (12") Remix
- 2008 – Connexão (12") Remix
- 2015 – Opará (12") (Ashley Beedle's Africanz On Marz Remix)
- 2017 – Clareia Remixes (12") (Henry Wu, Dego-2000 Black & IG Culture Remixes)

=== Featuring ===
- 1990 – Curumim – Azymuth (CD) Intima Records
- 1998 – Pieces of Ipanema – Azymuth (CD, LP) Far Out Records
- 2000 – A Terceira Morte de Joaquim Bolívar (Film/DVD) – Soundtrack
- 2001 – V – United Future Organization (CD, LP) Exceptional Records
- 2002 – Superágua – Superágua (CD) Zoo Records
- 2004 – Brazilian Soul – Azymuth (CD) Far Out Recordings
- 2009 – The Wave – Alex Malheiros & Banda Utopia Feat. Sabrina Malheiros (CD, LP) Far Out Recordings
- 2009 – Brazilika – Gilles Peterson (CD, LP) Far Out Recordings
- 2011 – Aurora – Azymuth (CD, LP) Far Out Recordings
- 2012 – Clementine Sun – Khari Cabral Simmons Dome Records
- 2015 – Muriel (Série Deluxe) – Sean Khan (CD) Far Out Recordings
- 2018 – Palmares Fantasy (feat. Hermeto Pascoal) – Sean Khan (CD, LP) Far Out Recordings
- 2021 – Tempos Futuros – Alex Malheiros (CD, LP) Far Out Recordings
- 2024 – Victoire de la musique – Cotonete (CD, LP) Heavenly Sweetness
