= Solo in Rio 1959 =

Studio album by Luiz Bonfá
- Released: February 22, 2005
- Recorded: 1959
- Genre: Brazilian jazz; bossa nova; samba
- Length: 67:48
- Label: Smithsonian Folkways; SFW CD 40483

Luiz Bonfá chronology
Love Dance (2003)	Solo in Rio 1959 (2005)	Strange Message (2015)

Solo in Rio 1959 is a studio album by Brazilian guitarist Luiz Bonfá, recorded in 1959 and released by Smithsonian Folkways on February 22, 2005.

== Reception ==
Professional ratings
Review scores
Source	Rating
AllMusic	5/5 stars

The AllMusic review by Thom Jurek stated, "Solo in Rio 1959 stands as a classic in the massive Luiz Bonfa catalog. [...] [It] offers an early hearing of Bonfá as fully developed, in possession of a stunning range of styles and techniques, all of them employable in the service of the song. The deep lyricism and harmonic richness of Bonfá's playing is unlike anything else before or since."

Leila Cobo of Billboard magazine wrote, "This breathtaking reissue of the original 1959 recording [...] showcases his playing solo, a rarity. The starkness of the recording only highlights its loveliness and swing. [...] This is not a technical album, but a purely musical one, where the nuances of the guitar are always at the service of the complex demands of his music. Every note can be heard with surprising clarity for music that thrives on harmonic surprise."

Música Brasileira wrote, "It's to the credit of the late Emory Cook that the sound on the CD is of outstanding quality, considering that it was recorded almost 50 years ago [...] This solo album reveals the guitarist's masterful technique."

== Track listing ==
All tracks are written by Luiz Bonfá except where noted.

No.	Title	Writer(s)	Length
1.	"Pernambuco"		1:41
2.	"Night and Day"	Cole Porter	2:10
3.	"Shearing"		1:26
4.	"Sambolero"		2:53
5.	"Calypso Minor"		1:47
6.	"Uma Prece" ('A Prayer')		2:36
7.	"Bonfabuloso"		2:10
8.	"Quebra Mar" ('The Seawall')		2:38
9.	"Luzes do Rio" ('Lights of Rio')		2:34
10.	"Perdido de Amor" ('Lost in Love')		3:26
11.	"Manhã de Carnaval"	Bonfá; Antônio Maria	2:27
12.	"Amor sem Adeus" ('Love Without Goodbye')	Bonfá; Antônio Carlos Jobim	2:04
13.	"Variações em Violão" ('Variations on Guitar')		1:28
14.	"Seringueiro"		2:53
15.	"Chopin"		1:48
16.	"Na Baixa do Sapateiro" ('In the Shoemaker's Hollow')	Ary Barroso	2:51
17.	"Murder"		2:30
18.	"A Brazilian in New York"		5:05
19.	"Prelude to Adventure in Space"		1:59
20.	"Tenderly"	Walter Gross; Jack Lawrence	1:44
21.	"Blue Madrid"		2:19
22.	"Marcha Escocesa" ('Scottish March')		1:13
23.	"Fanfarra" ('Fanfare')		0:57
24.	"Samba de Orfeu"	Bonfá; Maria	1:15
25.	"Manhã de Carnaval 2"	Bonfá; Maria	1:25
26.	"Perdido de Amor 2"		1:56
27.	"Sambolero 2"		3:10
28.	"Quebra Mar 2"		2:12
29.	"Seringueiro Excerpt"		0:32
30.	"Seringueiro 2"		2:03
31.	"Luzes do Rio 2"		2:36
Total length:			67:48

- Originally released in 1959 under the title O Violão de Luiz Bonfá. Tracks 18 to 31 are bonus tracks that did not appear on the original LP.

== Personnel ==
Musicians

- Luiz Bonfá – acoustic guitar, vocals

Technical

- Roberto Ruiz – project coordinator
- Daniel Sheehy, D.A. Sonneborn – production supervisor
- Mary Monseur – production coordinator
- Emily Gremlich – production assistant
- Emory Cook, Norman van der Sluys – recording engineer
- Helen Lindsay – audio technician
- Carla Borden – editing
- Pete Reiniger – digital editing, sound supervision
- Jacob Love – editorial assistant
- Malcolm Addey – mastering
- Eduardo Muszkat – adaptation, direction
- Anthony Weller – annotation, liner notes, text
- Jeff Place – archivist
- Richard James Burgess, Mark Gustafson, John "BJ John" Smith – marketing
- Sonya Cohen Cramer – design, layout design
- Luiz Novaes Bonfá – photography
- Mike Wollman – photography (cover)
