= Tereza Aragão =

Brazilian actress and activist

- Died: 1992; Rio de Janeiro, Brazil
- Occupations: Actress, cultural producer, political activist
- Spouse: Ferreira Gullar

Tereza Aragão (died 1992) was a Brazilian actress, cultural producer and political activist.

Linked to the student movements in Brazil, Aragão participated in the creation of the Centro Popular de Cultura of the National Union of Students (UNE) and, in 1962, helped to launch Grupo Opinião, which became an important space of cultural manifestation and politics at the time.

At Opinião, in partnership with journalist Sérgio Cabral, she directed "A Fina Flor do Samba", a program that presented weekly shows with composers, musicians and dancers from the samba schools of the suburbs of Rio de Janeiro in theatres in the South Zone. This work did not just bring forth the interest of Rio de Janeiro's elite to the associations, but also to these two worlds. Along with this, some artists gained notoriety through their participation in the shows, such as the composer Geraldo das Neves, the "Brechó da Mangueira", the rainha de bateria of Portela, Nega Pelé, and Martinho da Vila.

Aragão also took part in the resistance against the Military Dictatorship, during which time her husband, the poet Ferreira Gullar, whom she was married to until her death, was exiled to Argentina. Her name was immortalized in the song "Tereza Aragão" by Aparecida, released in 1975.
