= The New Face of Bonfá =

Studio album by Luiz Bonfá
- Released: 1970
- Recorded: March 15 – April 10, 1970
- Studio: Audio Studio B, Rio de Janeiro, Brazil; RCA Studio A, NYC
- Genre: Brazilian jazz; bossa nova
- Length: 33:06
- Label: RCA Victor; LSP-4376 LP
- Producer: Ernie Altschuler

Luiz Bonfá chronology
Bonfá (1968)	The New Face of Bonfá (1970)	Sanctuary (1971)

The New Face of Bonfá is a studio album by Brazilian guitarist Luiz Bonfá, recorded on March 15 – April 10, 1970 and released by RCA Victor in 1970. It was reissued on CD by RCA Brazil in 2003 (RCA 98541 CD).

== Reception ==
Professional ratings
Review scores
Source	Rating
AllMusic	3.5/5 stars

Alex Henderson of AllMusic wrote, "The New Face of Bonfá is an album of lush, very accessible, Brazilian-flavored pop-jazz. [...] [It] is a pleasant, respectable demonstration of the fact that commercialism doesn't have to be synonymous with musical prostitution."

Jazzwise called it "a botched crossover attempt by RCA with a big studio orchestra."

== Track listing ==
All tracks are written by Luiz Bonfá.

No.	Title	Length
1.	"Window Girl"	2:45
2.	"For a Distant Love"	3:27
3.	"Macumba"	2:48
4.	"Africana"	2:08
5.	"Salvador"	3:06
6.	"Medieval"	2:55
7.	"Helicopter 274"	3:32
8.	"Man Alone"	3:38
9.	"Sofisticada"	2:04
10.	"Savanarole"	3:39
11.	"Peixe Bom"	3:04
Total length:		33:06

== Personnel ==
Musicians

- Luiz Bonfá – acoustic guitar, twelve-string guitar, electric guitar, vocals; conductor, arranger – orchestral and rhythm (1, 4–6, 7, 11)
- Marty Manning – conductor, arranger; (1, 2, 5, 6, 7–9)
- Harold Coletta, Richard Dickler, Theodore Israel, Archie Levin, Maria Toledo, Emanuel Vardi – vocals
- Marilyn Jackson, Barbara Massey, Linda November, Stella Stevens – vocals, background vocals
- Phil Bodner, George Marge, Romeo Penque – flute
- Alan Rubin, Marvin Stamm – flugelhorn
- Alfred Brown – viola, vocals
- Harry Lookofsky – concertmaster, violin
- Harry Cykman, Max Ellen, Paul Gershman, Felix Giglio, Harold Kohon, David Nadien, Max Pollikoff, Matthew Raimondi, Elliot Rosoff, Tosha Samaroff – violin
- Seymour Barab, Charles McCracken, George Ricci, Alan Shulman, Anthony Sophos – cello
- Gene Bertoncini – acoustic and rhythm guitars
- Nelson Ângelo – acoustic guitar, rhythm guitar, and electric guitar
- Alvin Brehm, Homer Mensch – arco bass
- Ron Carter, Novelli – acoustic and electric bass
- Milton Banana – drums
- Gegê, Dom Um Romão – drums, percussion
- Bobby Rosengarden, Naná Vasconcelos – percussion
- Ray Barretto – congas

Technical

- Ernie Altschuler – producer
- Adriana Ramos – general coordination
- Ray Hall, Bill Horne – recording engineer
- Mort Goode – liner notes
- Claudia Bandeira, Andre Teixeira – cover art

2003 reissue

- Arnaldo DeSouteiro – re-release producer, liner notes
- Luigi Hoffer – remastering
