= Far Out Recordings =

British record label for Brazilian music

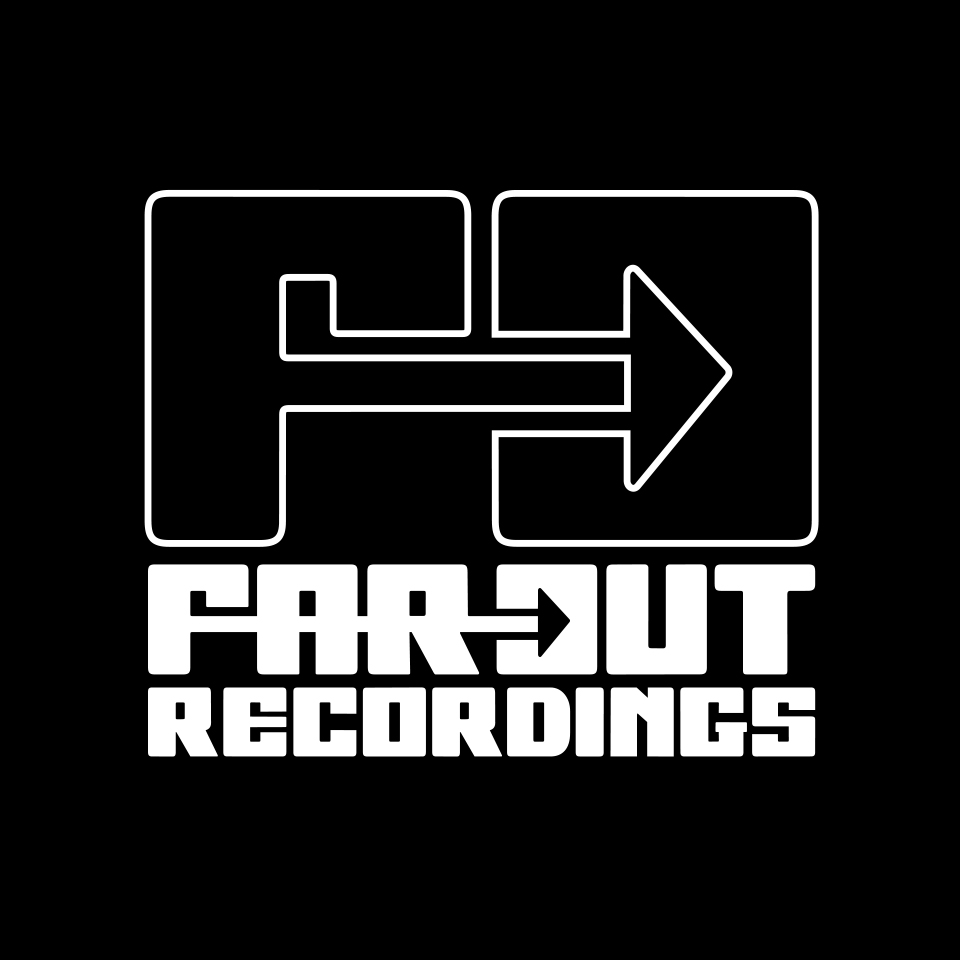

Far Out Recordings is a UK-based record label specialising in but not limited to the music of Brazil. It was founded in the mid-1990s and is run by DJ, entrepreneur and producer Joe Davis. Music released on the label extends from samba, jazz, MPB, soul and disco, to house, broken beat, electronica and remixes.

Since the mid-1990s Far Out Recordings has been releasing new albums by Azymuth, Arthur Verocai, Marcos Valle, Joyce, Sabrina Malheiros, The Ipanemas, Banda Black Rio, Antonio Adolfo and Amaro Freitas.

The label has released numerous previously unreleased archival recordings, including Hermeto Pascoal's Viajando Com O Som, Azymuth's Demos (1973-75), a Milton Nascimento performance of two ballets, Marcos Resende & Index's 1976 debut album, and Jose Mauro's A Viagem Das Horas. The latter was released as part of Far Out's Quartin series: reissuing the catalogue of Brazilian producer Roberto Quartin's 1970s label, this reissue series also included Jose Mauro's Obnoxius and early works by Victor Assis Brasil and Piry Reis.

The label is also well known for its electronic, dance and club releases having put out original productions and remixes by Theo Parrish, Mark Pritchard, Dego, Andres, Marcellus Pittman, Kirk Degiorgio, Nicola Conte, Henry Wu and Rick Willhite among others.

Among Far Out's catalogue also is a series of mixes called Brazilika, which includes entries from 4hero, Andy Votel, Gilles Peterson and Kenny "Dope" Gonzalez.

== Artists ==
- Azymuth
- Marcos Valle
- Hermeto Pascoal
- Joyce
- Milton Nascimento
- Fabiano do Nascimento
- Amaro Freitas
- The Ipanemas (with Wilson das Neves)
- Sabrina Malheiros
- Zeep (with Nina Miranda)
- Nomade Orquestra
- Nicola Conte
- Nana Vasconcelos
- Sean Khan
- Grupo Batuque
- Dori Caymmi
- Banda Black Rio
- Irakere
- Heidi Vogel
- Kirk Degiorgio
