= Aparecida (singer) =

- Born: Maria Aparecida Martins; 4 December 1939; Caxambu, Minas Gerais, Brazil
- Died: 1985 Rio de Janeiro, Brazil
- Genres: Samba
- Occupations: Singer, composer
- Years active: 1952–1985

Maria Aparecida Martins (4 December 1939 – 1985) was a Brazilian singer and composer whose career was mainly dedicated to samba and African rhythms.

== Biography ==
Aparecida was born in Caxambu, Minas Gerais on 4 December 1939. She moved to Rio de Janeiro in 1949 with her family, where she worked as a clothes ironer for families in the neighborhood of Vila Isabel. In 1952, she began to compose. She began her artistic career with Salvador Batista, in whose group she performed as a dancer for 10 years. She went to France at the beginning of the 1960s, where she performed at a nightclub where she performed her own compositions. In 1965, she returned to Brazil and won the Concurso de Música de Carnaval do IV Centenário da Cidade do Rio de Janeiro. That same year, her samba song Zumbi, Zumbi won the III Festival de Música de Favela.

In 1968, Aparecida composed the samba-enredo A sonata das matas for the samba school Caprichosos de Pilares. She was the second woman to win the samba-enredo dispute in a school after Dona Ivone Lara. Alongside Darci da Mangueira, Sidney da Conceição, Sabrina, and Chico Bondade, among others, she participated in the 1974 LP Roda de Samba. It would be the first time she recorded one of her compositions, Boa-noite. That same year the album Roda de samba nº 2 was released, featuring Nelson Cavaquinho, Sabrina, Roque do Plá, Rubens da Mangueira and Dida. This time, Aparecida sung Proteção (David Lima and Pinga) and Rosas para Iansã (Josefina de Lima).

Her first solo album, Aparecida, was recorded in 1966. Her repertoire included her songs Talundê, Nanã Boroquê, and Segredos do mar (all in partnership with Jair Paulo), Tereza Aragão, Meu São Benedito, and Inferno verde. She also sung an adaptation of the folklore song A Maria começa a beber. 10 years would pass until she released her second LP, Foram 17 anos, in which she returned to recording her compositions, among them 17 anos, Grongoiô, propoiô (in partnership with João R. Xavier and Mariozinho de Acari) and Diongo, mundiongo. This would be followed by Grandes sucessos 1977), Cantigas de fé (1978), 13 de maio (1979), Os Deuses Afros (1980) e A rosa do mar (1983).

== Discography ==
- Roda de samba (1974) - CID
- Roda de samba nº 2 (1974) - CID
- Aparecida (1975) - CID
- Foram 17 anos (1976) - CID
- Grandes sucessos (1977) - CID
- Cantigas de fé (1978) - RCA Victor
- 13 de maio (1979) - RCA Victor
- Os deuses afros (1980) - CID
- A rosa do mar (1983) - CID
- Aparecida, samba, afro, axé (1996) CID

== Bibliography ==
- Aparecida. Cantoras do Brasil
- Aparecida. Dicionário Cravo Albin da Música Popular Brasileira
- SANTOS, N. C. Clementina de Jesus, Aparecida Martins e a tradição de mulheres negras sambistas. REVISTA DO ARQUIVO GERAL DA CIDADE DO RIO DE JANEIRO, v. 20, p. 65-81, 2022.
- SANTOS, N. C. Lukombo: o rito de celebração à sambista Maria Aparecida Martins. In. Movimento Samba: 10 anos de Samba Sampa. 1.ed. São Paulo: Oralituras, 2023, p. 70-81
