= Luiz Bonfá =

Brazilian guitarist and composer (1922–2001)

- Bonfá with craviola guitar, 1970

Background information
- Born: Luiz Floriano Bonfá; 17 October 1922; Rio de Janeiro, Brazil
- Died: 12 January 2001 (aged 78) Rio de Janeiro, Brazil
- Genres: Brazilian jazz; samba-canção; bossa nova
- Occupations: Musician; composer; singer
- Instruments: Acoustic guitar; Craviola guitar
- Years active: 1940s–2001
- Labels: Atlantic; Columbia; Continental; Cook; Decca; Dot; London; Mercury; Odeon; Philips; Polydor; RCA; Verve

Luiz Floriano Bonfá (17 October 1922 – 12 January 2001) was a Brazilian guitarist and composer. He was best known for the music he composed for the film Black Orpheus.

== Early life and training ==
Luiz Floriano Bonfá was born on 17 October 1922, in Rio de Janeiro. His father was an Italian immigrant. He began studying with Uruguayan classical guitarist Isaías Sávio at the age of 11. These weekly lessons entailed a long, harsh commute (on foot, plus two and a half hours on train) from his family home in Santa Cruz, in the western rural outskirts of Rio de Janeiro, to the teacher's home in the hills of Santa Teresa. Given Bonfá's extraordinary dedication and talent for the guitar, Sávio excused the youngster's inability to pay for his lessons. craviola

== Career ==
Bonfá first gained widespread exposure in Brazil in 1947 when he was featured on Rio's Rádio Nacional, then an important showcase for up-and-coming talent. He was a member of the vocal group Quitandinha Serenaders in the late 1940s. Some of his first compositions, such as "Ranchinho de Palha" and "O Vento Não Sabe", were recorded and performed by Brazilian crooner Dick Farney in the 1950s. Bonfá's first hit song was "De Cigarro em Cigarro", recorded by Nora Ney in 1957.

Bonfá in 1958

It was through Farney that Bonfá was introduced to Antônio Carlos Jobim and Vinicius de Moraes, the leading songwriting team behind the worldwide explosion of bossa nova in the late 1950s to 1970s. Bonfá collaborated with them and with other prominent Brazilian musicians and artists in productions of de Moraes's anthological play Orfeu da Conceição, which several years later gave origin to Marcel Camus's film Black Orpheus (Orfeu Negro in Portuguese). In the burgeoning days of Rio de Janeiro's jazz scene, it was commonplace for musicians, artists, and dramatists to collaborate in such theatrical presentations. Bonfá wrote some of the original music featured in the film, including the numbers "Samba de Orfeu" and his most famous composition, "Manhã de Carnaval" (of which Carl Sigman later wrote a different set of English lyrics titled "A Day in the Life of a Fool"), which has been among the top ten standards played worldwide, according to The Guinness Book of World Records.

As a composer and performer, Bonfá was an exponent of the bold, lyrical, lushly orchestrated, and emotionally charged samba-canção style that predated the arrival of João Gilberto's more refined and subdued bossa nova style. Jobim, João Donato, Dorival Caymmi, and other contemporaries were also essentially samba-canção musicians until the sudden, massive popularity of the young Gilberto's unique style of guitar playing and expressively muted vocals transformed the genre. Camus's film and Gilberto's and Jobim's collaborations with American jazz musicians, such as Stan Getz and Charlie Byrd, did much to bring international recognition to Brazilian popular music. Bonfá became a highly visible ambassador of Brazilian music in the United States beginning with the famous November 1962 bossa nova concert at New York's Carnegie Hall.

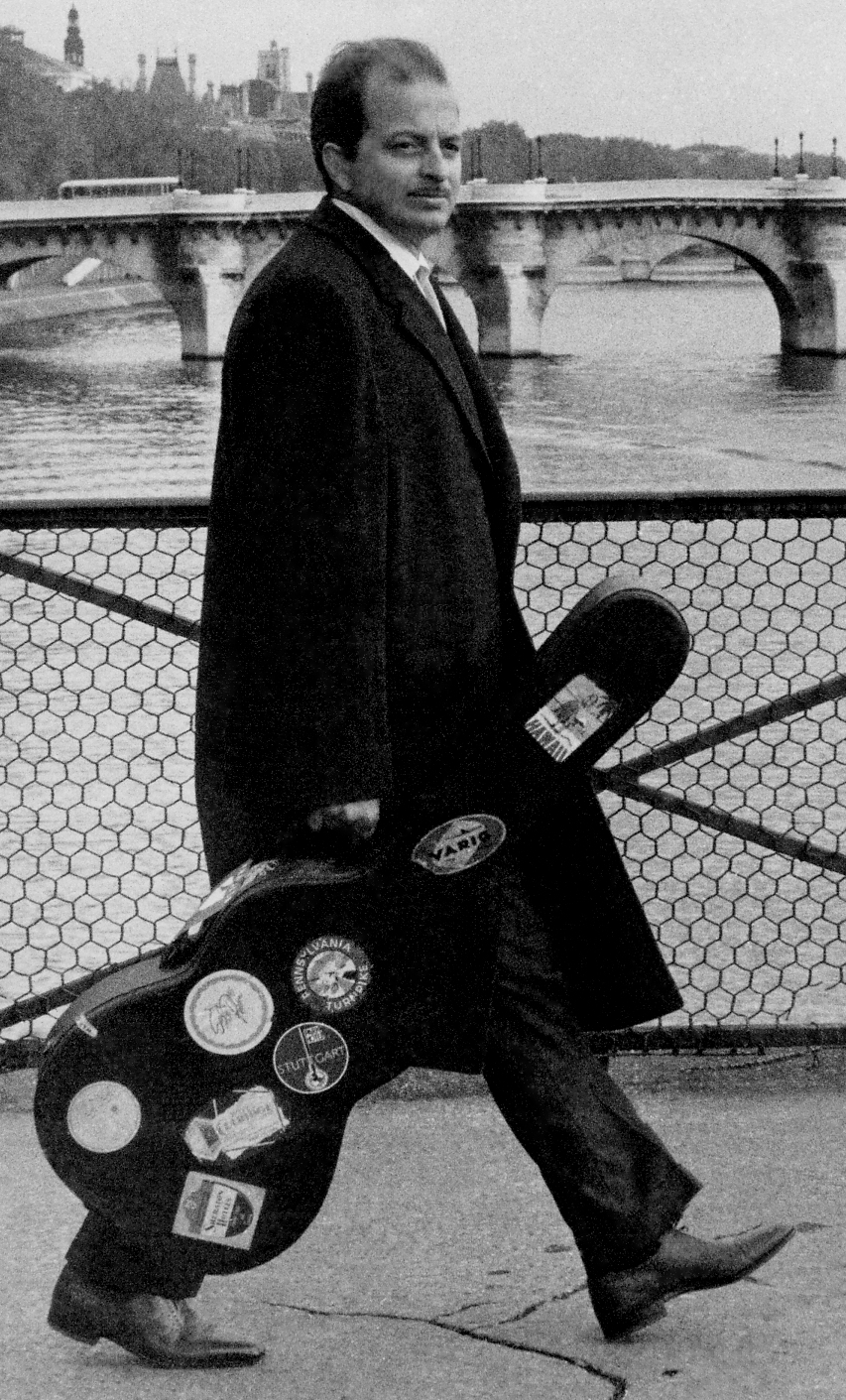
Bonfá in Paris, 1962

Bonfá worked with American musicians such as Quincy Jones, George Benson, Stan Getz, and Frank Sinatra, recording several albums while in the US. Elvis Presley sang the Bonfá composition "Almost in Love", with lyrics by Randy Starr, in the 1968 MGM film Live a Little, Love a Little. Also notable are his compositions "The Gentle Rain", with lyrics by Matt Dubey, "Non-Stop to Brazil" (recorded by Astrud Gilberto), and "Sambolero".

From 1990 to 1999, Bonfá worked with singer Ithamara Koorax on several recordings and concerts, appearing live with her as special guest at several venues in Rio de Janeiro, such as Teatro Rival, BNDES Auditorium, and Funarte-Sidney Miller Hall. They also recorded together, in 1996, the album Almost In Love – Ithamara Koorax Sings The Luiz Bonfá Songbook, featuring Bonfá on acoustic guitar plus special guests Larry Coryell, Eumir Deodato, Ron Carter, Marcos Suzano, and Sadao Watanabe. The sessions, produced by Arnaldo DeSouteiro, were filmed for a Japanese TV broadcast presented by Watanabe.

Bonfá wrote soundtracks for two dozen films, including Black Orpheus, O Santo Módico, Os Cafajestes, The Gentle Rain, Pour un amour lointain, Le ore dell'amore, Carnival of Crime, and Prisoner of Rio (on which he collaborated with arranger Hans Zimmer), among many others.

== Death ==
Bonfá died of cancer in Rio de Janeiro on 12 January 2001, aged 78. At the time of his death, he was working on soundtracks for a film produced and starred in by Karen Black and for a Broadway show titled Brazilian Bombshell, based on the life of Carmen Miranda and to be starred in by Sônia Braga.

== Legacy ==
In 2005, the Smithsonian Folkways record label re-released an album of Bonfá's work, Solo in Rio 1959, including previously unreleased material from the original recording session.

In 2008, Universal Music France released a coffee table book containing two CDs which included previously unreleased material of the Black Orpheus soundtrack, and a DVD. That same year, Universal Music released The Brazilian Scene, Braziliana, and Black Orpheus, celebrating the 50th anniversary of bossa nova.

Bonfá's major legacy continues to be his compositions from the Black Orpheus soundtrack, most notably the instantly recognisable bossa nova classic "Manhã de Carnaval". His discography also attests to his inventive mastery of Brazilian jazz guitar. His guitar style was brassier and more penetrating than that of his major contemporary, João Gilberto, and Bonfá was a frequent and adept soloist whereas Gilberto played his own suave, intricate brand of rhythm guitar almost exclusively. Bonfá often played solo guitar in a polyphonic style, harmonising melody lines in a manner similar to that made famous by Wes Montgomery in the US, or playing lead and rhythm parts simultaneously. As a composer and as a guitarist, Bonfá played a pivotal role in bridging the incumbent samba-canção style with the innovations of the bossa nova movement.

=== Sampling ===
Several of Bonfá's songs have been sampled by groups, musicians, MCs, rappers, and DJs. "Bahia Soul" was sampled by the British band Smoke City in "Underwater Love". "Saudade Vem Correndo" was sampled in "Runnin'" by the hip-hop group The Pharcyde. It was also sampled in Mýa's song "Fallen" and Iyla's "Shampoo". "Jacarandá" was sampled by the Brazilian rap-rock band Planet Hemp in "Se Liga". "Bonfá Nova" and "Ebony Samba (alternate take)" were both sampled by the Brazilian rapper Marcelo D2 in "A Procura da Batida Perfeita" and "Batidas e Levadas", respectively. The Japanese DJ Nujabes sampled "In the Shade of the Mango Tree" on his track "Lady Brown". "In the Shade of the Mango Tree" was sampled again by JPEGMafia (as Devon Hendryx) on his track "Phantasy Star"; he later sampled "Saudade Vem Correndo" in "DIKEMBE!".

Will.i.am featured the melody of "Manhã de Carnaval" in his song "Smile Mona Lisa".

Belgian-Australian singer Gotye sampled "Seville" from the album Luiz Bonfa Plays Great Songs for his song "Somebody That I Used to Know", featuring New Zealand singer Kimbra. This was in turn sampled by American rapper Doechii for her song "Anxiety".

== Discography ==
=== As leader/co-leader ===
- 1955: Luiz Bonfá (10″, Continental LPP-21)
- 1956: De Cigarro em Cigarro (10″, Continental LPP-53)
- 1956: Noite e Dia with Eduardo Lincoln (Continental LPP-3018)
- 1956: Meia-Noite em Copacabana (Polydor LPNG 4004)
- 1956: Edu N.2 (Rádio 0036-V)
- 1956: Orfeu da Conceição (Odeon MODB-3056)
- 1957: Alta Versatilidade (Odeon MOFB-3003)
- 1957: Violão Boêmio (Odeon MOFB-3014)
- 1958: Ritmo Continentais (Odeon MOFB-3020)
- 1958: Bonfafá with Fafá Lemos (Odeon MOFB-3047)
- 1958: Luiz Bonfá e Silvia Telles (Odeon BWB-1040)
- 1958: Meu Querido Violão (Odeon MOFB-3076)
- 1958: Toca Melodias das Américas (Imperial 30009)
- 1958: ¡Amor! The Fabulous Guitar of Luiz Bonfa (Atlantic SD 8028)
- 1959: Black Orpheus (Orfeu Negro) O.S.T., with Antônio Carlos Jobim (Epic LN3672; 10″, Philips B76.470R; re-released also on Fontana and Verve)
- 1959: O Violão de Luiz Bonfá (Cook 1134)
- 1960: A Voz e o Violão with Norma Suely (Odeon MOFB-3144)
- 1960: Passeio no Rio (Odeon BWB-1151)
- 1961: Pery Ribeiro (Odeon 7BD-1011)
- 1961: Luiz Bonfá (Odeon 7BD-1017)
- 1961: Pery Ribeiro e Seu Mundo de Canções Românticas with Pery Ribeiro (Odeon MOFB-3272)
- 1961: Sócio de Alcova (RCA LCD-1007)
- 1962: O Violão e o Samba (Odeon MOFB 3295)
- 1962: Le Roi de la Bossa Nova (Fontana 680.228ML)
- 1962: Bossa Nova no Carnegie Hall (Audio Fidelity AFLP 2101)
- 1962: Luiz Bonfá Plays and Sings Bossa Nova (Verve V6-8522)
- 1962: Le Ore dell'amore (C.A.M. CEP.45-102)
- 1963: Caterina Valente e Luiz Bonfá (London LLN 7090)
- 1963: Jazz Samba Encore! with Stan Getz (Verve V6-8523)
- 1963: Recado Novo de Luiz Bonfá (Odeon MOFB 3310)
- 1963: Violão Boêmio Vol. 2 (Odeon SMOFB 3360)
- 1964: Rio with Paul Winter (Columbia CS 9115)
- 1965: The Gentle Rain film soundtrack, with Eumir Deodato (Mercury SR 61016)
- 1965: The Shadow of Your Smile (Verve V6-8629)
- 1965: Braziliana with Maria Helena Toledo (Philips PHS 600–199)
- 1965: The New Sound of Brazil with João Donato (RCA LSP-3473)
- 1965: The Brazilian Scene (Philips PHS 600–208)
- 1967: Pour un amour lointain (United Artists 36.123 UAE)
- 1967: Luiz Bonfá (Dot DLP 25804)
- 1967: Stevie & Eydie, Bonfá & Brazil with Steve Lawrence and Eydie Gormé (Columbia CS 9530)
- 1967: Luiz Bonfa Plays Great Songs (Dot DLP 25825)
- 1968: Black Orpheus Impressions (Dot DLP 25848)
- 1968: Bonfá (Dot DLP 25881)
- 1970: The New Face of Bonfá (RCA LSP-4376)
- 1971: Sanctuary (RCA LSP-4591)
- 1972: Introspection (RCA FSP-297)
- 1973: Jacarandá (Ranwood R-8112)
- 1978: Bonfá Burrows Brazil (Cherry Pie CPF 1045)
- 1986: For A Distant Love with Yana Purim (Pausa Records PR 7203)
- 1989: Non-Stop to Brazil (Chesky JD29)
- 1992: The Bonfá Magic (Caju Music 511.404-2) re-released also on Milestone Records and JVC Victor
- 1992: The Brazil Project with Toots Thielemans (Private Music 82101)
- 1992: The Brazil Project 2 with Toots Thielemans (Private Music 82110)
- 1995: Rio Vermelho/Red River with Ithamara Koorax (Imagem 2012)
- 1996: Almost In Love – Ithamara Koorax Sings The Luiz Bonfá Songbook (Paddle Wheel KICP 503)
- 1997: Here In My Heart with Kenny Rankin (Private Music 0100582148–2)
- 2003: Love Dance with Ithamara Koorax (Milestone MCD 9327–2)
- 2005: Solo in Rio 1959 (Smithsonian Folkways SFW CD 40483)
- 2015: Strange Message

=== As sideman ===
- 1965: Quincy Plays for Pussycats with Quincy Jones (Mercury SR 61050)
- 1965: The Movie Song Album with Tony Bennett (Columbia CS 9272)
- 1969: My Way with Frank Sinatra (Reprise FS 1029)
- 1969: I Got a Woman and Some Blues with George Benson (A&M SP-9-3025)
