= Belchior (singer) =

Brazilian composer and singer (1946–2017)

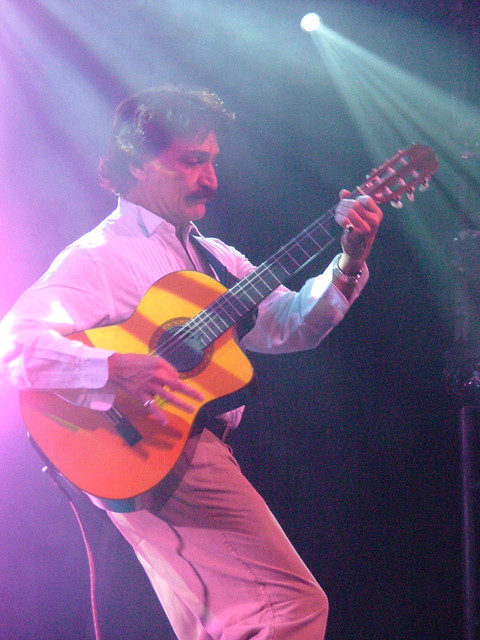
- Belchior performing in 2004

Background information
- Born: Antônio Carlos Belchior (Note: Several sources indicate that at some point Belchior jokingly added his parents' surnames to his name; however, other sources indicate that his full name was in fact Antonio Carlos Gomes Belchior Fontenelle Fernandes.); October 26, 1946; Sobral, Ceará, Brazil
- Died: April 30, 2017 (aged 70) Santa Cruz do Sul, Rio Grande do Sul, Brazil
- Genres: MPB; rock; blues; folk rock; baião; country
- Occupations: singer; songwriter; musician; record producer
- Instruments: vocals; classical guitar
- Years active: 1965–2017
- Labels: Copacabana; Continental; Chantecler; Phonogram; WEA; Paraíso Discos; Camerati; PolyGram; MoviePlay; GPA; BMG; Universal; Som Livre
- Award: List

Belchior (Portuguese pronunciation: [bew.kiˈɔɾ], born Antônio Carlos Belchior, (Sobral, 26 October 1946 – Santa Cruz do Sul, 30 April 2017) was a Brazilian singer, poet, songwriter, musician, record producer, biology teacher, illustrator and visual artist. He was one of the young artists born in Ceará who emerged in the early 1970s on the Brazilian cultural scene and one of the first MPB singers from the Brazilian northeast to reach mainstream success at the time. During an interview, when saying his full name, Antônio Carlos Gomes Belchior Fontenelle Fernandes, the singer jokingly added that he held the "biggest name in MPB".

His 1976 album Alucinação [English: Hallucination] is considered by many critics to be the single most influential album in the history of MPB, and one of the most important music albums ever published in Brazil. In 2008, Rolling Stone Brasil named Belchior as the 100th greatest artist in Brazilian music history, and subsequently as the 58th biggest voice in Brazilian music history.

Among his greatest hits are "Apenas um Rapaz Latino-Americano", "Como Nossos Pais", "Mucuripe", "Divina Comédia Humana", "Tudo Outra Vez", "Comentário a Respeito de John", "Coração Selvagem", "Ypê", "Medo de Avião", "Galos, Noites e Quintais", "Paralelas", "Conheço meu Lugar", "Cemitério", "Fotografia 3×4", "Velha Roupa Colorida", "Rock Romance de Um Robô Goliardo", "A Palo Seco", "Na Hora do Almoço", "Pequeno Mapa do Tempo", "Balada de Madame Frigidaire", "Caso Comum de Trânsito", "Antes do Fim", "Não Leve Flores", "Voz da América", "Como o Diabo Gosta", "Vício Elegante", "Meu Cordial Brasileiro", "Alucinação", "Sujeito de Sorte" and "Morena Cor do Cacau".

In the final years of his life, Belchior reportedly disappeared on two occasions and was ultimately found in Uruguay. During this period, the singer went through a series of difficult circumstances, leaving behind debts, depending on others and at times sleeping on the streets. After a career that spanned several decades, he died at the age of 70 from a ruptured aortic aneurysm.

== Biography ==
=== Early years ===
Antônio Carlos Belchior was born in Sobral, Ceará, Brazil on October 26, 1946. During his childhood he was an itinerant folk singer and repentista poet. He studied music, choral singing and piano with Acácio Halley. His father, Otávio Belchior Fernandes (1905–1980), was a highly respected figure in the city, serving as a judge and police chief. His mother, Dolores Gomes Fontenelle Fernandes (1921–2011), sang in the church choir. As a child he was influenced by radio singers Ângela Maria, Cauby Peixoto and Nora Ney. He worked as a radio programmer in Sobral.

After completing his secondary studies at the Colégio Sobralense (later the Colégio Diocesano Sobralense), Belchior decided to spend a period in religious discipline. For three years he lived in community with Italian friars at the Capuchin monastery in Guaramiranga, where he studied Latin, Italian and Gregorian chant. He subsequently returned to Fortaleza, where he studied medicine, but dropped out in his fourth year in 1971 to pursue an artistic career.

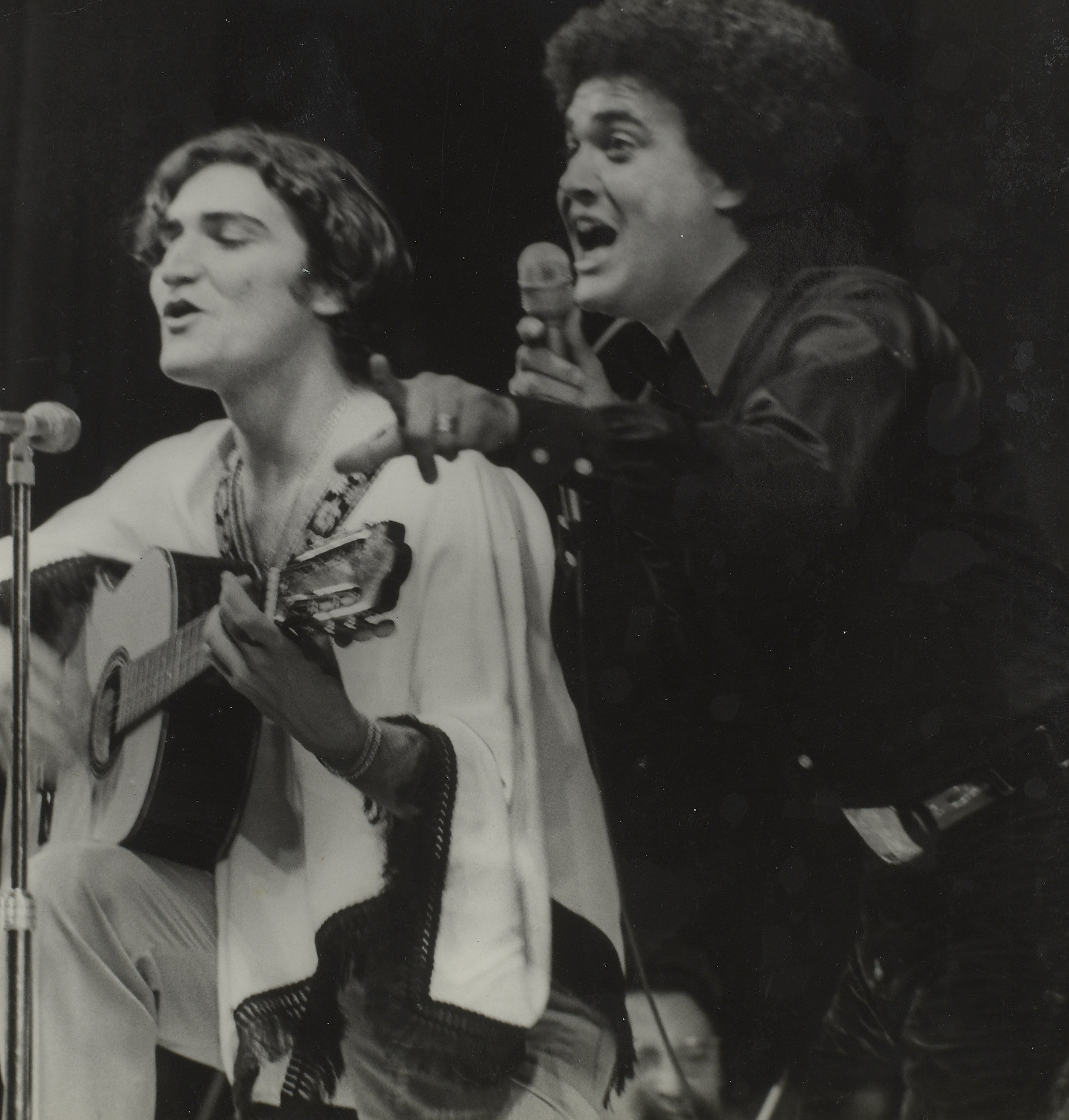
Belchior at the 4th University Festival in 1971

He became associated with a group of young composers and musicians including Fagner, Ednardo, Amelinha, Jorge Mello, Rodger Rogério, Teti, Cirino and others. The group was known as the "Pessoal do Ceará" [English: People from Ceará].

From 1967 to 1970 he performed at music festivals in northeastern Brazil.

=== Years in Rio de Janeiro ===
In 1971, after moving to Rio de Janeiro, he won the IV Festival Universitário da MPB [English: 4th University MPB Festival] hosted by TV Tupi with the song "Na Hora do Almoço", performed by Jorginho Telles and Jorge Nery. With this award-winning song, Belchior made his recording debut as a singer, releasing a single on the Copacabana label.

=== Years in São Paulo ===
Belchior moved to São Paulo in 1972, where he composed songs for several short films, working both individually and in groups. In the same year, Elis Regina recorded his song Mucuripe (with Fagner), which was later recorded by Roberto Carlos. He performed in schools, theatres, hospitals, prisons, factories and on television. He recorded his first LP (Mote e glosa) in 1974, on the Chantecler label.

His second album, Alucinação (PolyGram, 1976), consolidated his career, featuring successful songs such as "Velha Roupa Colorida" and "Como Nossos Pais", released by Elis Regina in 1975 in her concert Falso Brilhante, as well as "Apenas um Rapaz Latino-Americano". In the second half of 1976 he was invited to be one of the founding artists of WEA in Brazil, now known as Warner Music Group. Thanks to these hits, Alucinação sold 30,000 copies in just one month. Other successes include "Paralelas", released by Vanusa, and "Galos, Noites e Quintais", re-recorded by Jair Rodrigues.

In 1979, on the LP Era uma Vez um Homem e Seu Tempo (Warner), he recorded "Comentário a Respeito de John", a tribute to John Lennon, which was also recorded by the singer Bianca. In 1983, he and a business partner founded their own production company and record label, Paraíso Discos, and in 1997 he became a shareholder in Camerati Records, both based in São Paulo. His discography includes Um show – dez anos de sucesso (1986, Continental) and Vício Elegante (1996, GPA Music/Paraíso), featuring re-recordings of hits by other composers.

Belchior being interviewed on the programme "A Vida é um Show" in 2003

In 2005, Belchior met Edna Assunção de Araújo, who went by as Edna Prometheu. They met at the studio of the Ceará-born visual artist and mutual friend Aldemir Martins. That same year, Belchior divorced his first wife, Angela Margaret (née Henman), after 35 years living together.

In 2006, his artistic manager of nearly 30 years, Hélio Rodrigues, of Spanish descent, moved to Spain and Portugal for several years.

In August 2009, the Fantástico TV show reported that Belchior had not been seen since 2007, after leaving his car parked at the Congonhas Airport, in São Paulo. There were rumors that he had gone into hiding, engaged on the translation of Dante's Divine Comedy into Portuguese, a project on which he had been working for some time. According to the TV news, not even his family had heard from the singer or knew his whereabouts.

=== Departure from São Paulo ===
Throughout 2008, from his departure from São Paulo to his arrival in Rio Grande do Sul, Belchior had no fixed address.

After his death, several journalists identified the main reason for his disappearance and abandonment of his possessions in São Paulo as being his debts. Belchior was reportedly facing legal proceedings related to alimony payments for his ex-wife and a younger daughter he had outside of marriage, as well as a labour lawsuit involving former employees. At least one former producer successfully sued the singer.

As a result of these proceedings, Belchior had his cars seized and his bank accounts frozen, preventing him from accessing his copyright royalties. At first, Belchior managed to sustain himself on royalty income from his music. He then went to Rio Grande do Sul and Uruguay, where he stayed in hotels, the homes of fans and a charitable institution.

=== Years in Rio Grande do Sul and Uruguay ===
From 2009 to 2017, the year of his death, Belchior and his partner Edna Assunção de Araújo lived in many cities in Rio Grande do Sul and Uruguay, which borders Brazil.

In 2009, TV Globo reported the singer's supposed disappearance. According to the broadcaster, Belchior had last been seen in April of that year, when he appeared at a show by tropicalist singer Tom Zé in Brasília. Fagner, a friend of the singer, said he had seen Belchior in Canela, Rio Grande do Sul, at a musical event in 2009. Brazilian tourists claimed to have seen him in Uruguay in July of the same year. In Uruguay, he was interviewed by the Globo TV show Fantástico, declaring that he had not disappeared and was preparing an album of new songs, along with the release of all his songs in Spanish.

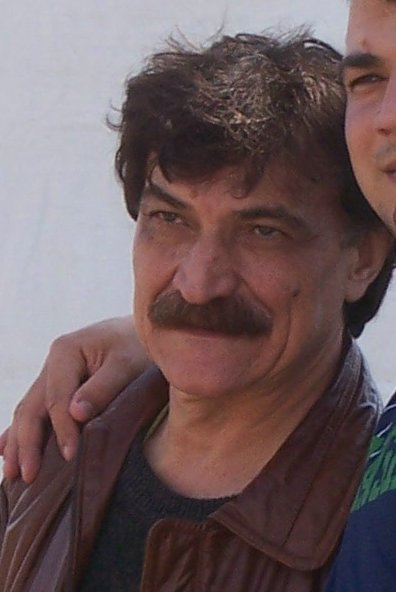
Belchior in 2005

During the years he lived in Rio Grande do Sul and Uruguay, Belchior and Edna had no fixed residence and were taken in at the homes of friends and fans, with their hosts covering their expenses. The cities they had been to included Porto Alegre, Santa Vitória do Palmar, São Lourenço do Sul, Xangri-lá, the Atlântida Sul beach (in Osório), Guaíba, Cachoeirinha, Jaguarão, Quaraí, Sobradinho and, finally, Santa Cruz do Sul, where Belchior died in 2017.

During these final years, Belchior visited Uruguay on at least two occasions: in 2009 in San Gregorio de Polanco, in the central region of Uruguay, and in 2012 in Artigas, a twin city of Quaraí, where he had lived. After his stay in Artigas, he disappeared again, alongside his wife, from a 4-star hotel, leaving unpaid bills and personal objects behind. For years, not even his family was aware of his whereabouts. Afterwards, when spotted walking around Porto Alegre, he claimed that the news about the hotel debt in Uruguay was untrue.

=== Death ===
Belchior died on April 30th 2017 at the age of 70, in Santa Cruz do Sul, Rio Grande do Sul. The government of Ceará issued a letter of condolence. The cause of death was the rupture of an aneurysm of the aorta, the largest artery of the human body.

The then Governor of Ceará, Camilo Santana, declared three days of official mourning and arranged for the body to be taken to Ceará, in accordance with the singer's wishes to be buried in his home state. The wake was held in Sobral, his hometown, and he was buried in Fortaleza.

== Tributes ==
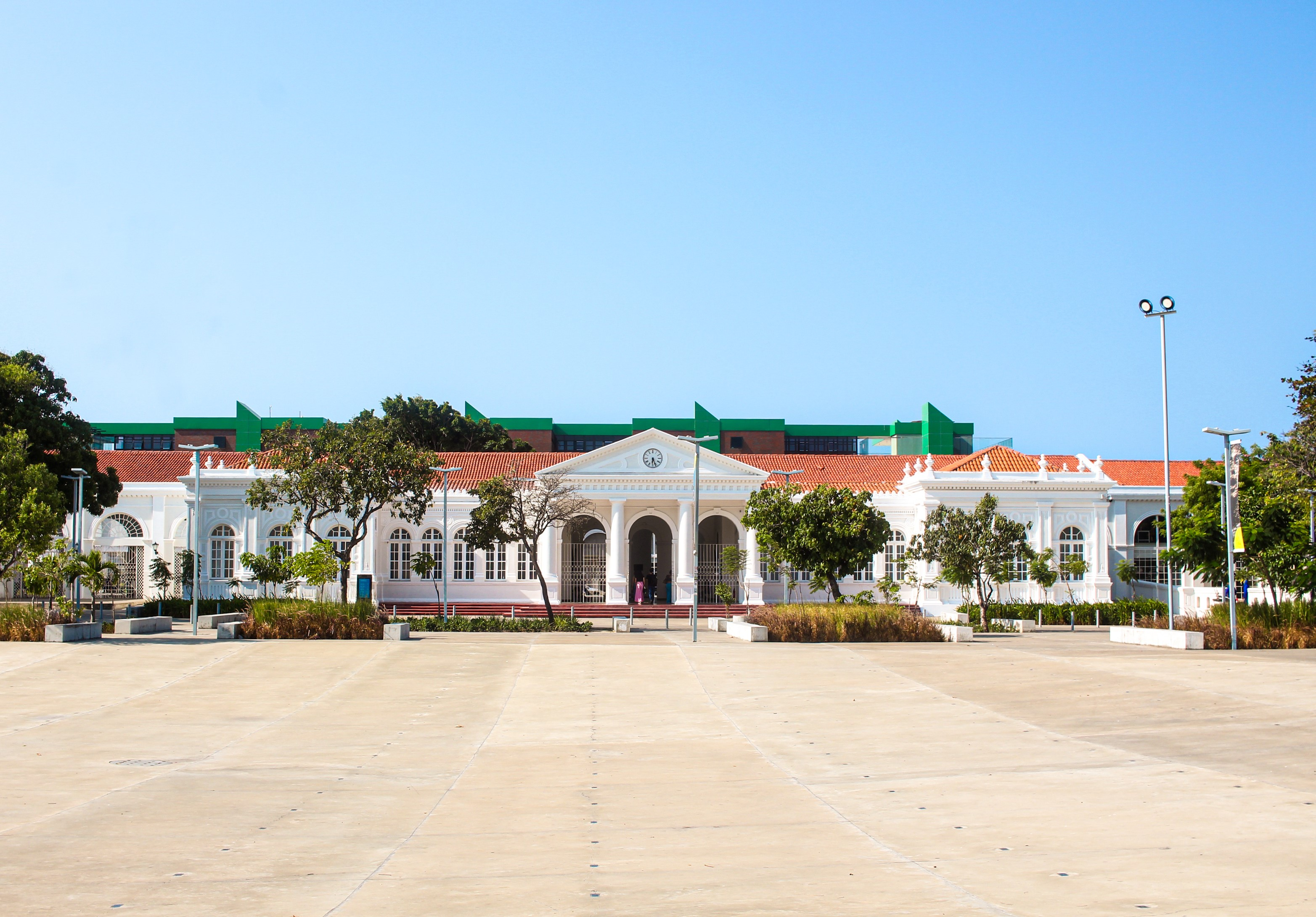
The Estação das Artes Belchior Cultural Complex in Fortaleza, one of the tributes to the singer.

- From February to December 2016, the Projeto Belchior 70, organized by professor Josely Teixeira Carlos, a researcher and author of a master's dissertation and doctoral thesis on the artist, examined Belchior's entire authored discography across a series of radio programmes;
- In October 2016, the Programa Especial das Seis on radio Educadora FM da Bahia dedicated five special shows to Belchior's work. Josely Teixeira Carlos was invited by the station to present the series, which was re-aired in May 2017 following the artist's death;
- During October and November 2016 in Fortaleza, the project Belchior Sete Zero celebrated Belchior's 70th birthday, the most significant tribute the artist received during his lifetime. Produced by Marta Pinheiro, Rogers Tabosa and Ricardo Kelmer and encompassing around twenty events, the project involved bars, colleges and cultural venues such as the Teatro José de Alencar, the Centro Cultural Banco do Nordeste, the newspaper O Povo, the Teatro Carlos Câmara and CUCA. It also included the launch of the book Para Belchior com Amor, organised by writer Ricardo Kelmer. The show also featured debates, musical performances and stagings of the theatrical piece De Olhos Abertos Lhe Direi by Ricardo Guilherme, created especially for the project;
- In October 2016, the book Para Belchior com Amor (Miragem Editorial) was published, organised by writer Ricardo Kelmer, featuring short stories, chronicles and letters by 14 authors from Ceará, inspired by Belchior's songs. Contributors include Thiago Arrais, Ana Karla Dubiela, José Américo Bezerra Saraiva, Ricardo Guilherme, Ethel de Paula, Cleudene Aragão, Ricardo Kelmer, Raymundo Netto, Joan Edesson de Oliveira, Gero Camilo, Carmélia Aragão, Jeff Peixoto, Xico Sá and Roberto Maciel;
- Also in October 2016, the album Alucinação - Marcelo Filho canta Belchior was released, in which the São Paulo musician Marcelo Filho re-recorded the most successful album of the Ceará composer's career as a tribute to him while he was still alive, even though his whereabouts were unknown;
- In December 2016, the "14th Prêmio Hangar de Música" chose the theme "Vamos Cantar Belchior" (English: Let's sing Belchior), having many artists from Rio Grande do Norte to celebrate and pay tribute to him;
- In January 2017 (before his death), Belchior had his name given to a carnival block in Belo Horizonte. The "Volta, Belchior" [English: Come back, Belchior] block, with all participants wearing a Zapata-style moustache like the singer, paraded through the Santa Tereza neighbourhood;
- In February 2019, the book Belchior - Abraços e Canções - Entrevista Inédita was published, organised by his younger sister Ângela Belchior and Estêvão Zizzi, based on an interview that Belchior reportedly gave in 2005;
- In February 2024, it was announced that Canal Brasil is working on a miniseries telling the singer's story. The fictional series will be called Alucinação.

== Discography ==
Studio albums

- 1974 – Belchior (Chantecler – LP/CD/K7)
- 1976 – Alucinação (Phonogram – LP/CD/K7)
- 1977 – Coração Selvagem (Warner – LP/CD/K7)
- 1978 – Todos os Sentidos (Warner – LP/CD/K7)
- 1979 – Era uma Vez um Homem e Seu Tempo (Warner – LP/CD/K7)
- 1980 – Objeto Direto (Warner – LP/CD)
- 1982 – Paraíso (Warner – LP/CD)
- 1984 – Cenas do Próximo Capítulo (Paraíso/Camerati – LP/CD)
- 1987 – Melodrama (PolyGram – LP/CD/K7)
- 1988 – Elogio da Loucura (PolyGram – LP/CD/K7)
- 1991 – Divina Comédia Humana (MoviePlay – CD)
- 1993 – Baihuno (MoviePlay – CD)
- 1996 – Vício Elegante (Paraíso/GPA Music – CD)
- 1999 – Autorretrato (BMG – double CD)

Singles

- 1971 – "Na Hora do Almoço" (Belchior) / "Quem Me Dera" (Osny) (Copacabana)
- 1973 – "Sorry, Baby" / "A Palo Seco" (Chantecler)

Collaborative releases

- 1991 – Contradança - Acústico (with Duofel) (Paraíso – LP)
- 1992 – Eldorado (with Larbanois & Carrero) (MoviePlay – CD)
- 1999 – Um Concerto a Palo Seco (with Gilvan de Oliveira) (Camerati – CD) – re-released as Antologia Lírica com Gilvan de Oliveira - Acústico (1999) and Acústico (2006) on the Arlequim Discos label.
- 2002 – Pessoal do Ceará (with Amelinha and Ednardo) – Continental/Warner – CD
- 2003 – Ventos e Versos (with Augusto Ramacciotti) (CD Point – CD)

Live albums

- 1986 – Um Show: 10 Anos de Sucesso (Continental – LP)
- 1990 – Trilhas Sonoras (Continental – LP)
- 1995 – Um Concerto Bárbaro: Acústico ao Vivo (Universal Music – CD)

Compilations

- 1990 – Projeto Fanzine (Warner – LP/CD/K7)
- 1991 – Grandes Sucessos de Belchior (Som Livre/Gala – LP/CD/K7)
- 1997 – Pop Brasil (Warner Music/WEA – CD)
- 1998 – Millennium (Polygram – CD)
- 2008 – Sempre (Som Livre – CD)
- 2017 – Belchior 70 Anos - Pequeno Mapa do Tempo (Warner Music – CD)

Featured appearances

- 1979 – Massafeira

Tribute albums

- 2012 – Belchior Blues – tribute by several artists from across Brazil who recorded some of Belchior's greatest hits
- 2014 – Ainda Somos os Mesmos – tribute by several independent artists who recorded the album Alucinação in full

== Awards and honours ==
- 2009 – "Como Nossos Pais" (written by Belchior) was named one of the 100 Greatest Brazilian Songs by Rolling Stone Brasil, ranked 43rd;
- 2012 – Belchior was featured on the 100 Greatest Voices in Brazilian Music list by Rolling Stone Brasil, ranked 58th;
- 2012 – Belchior was featured on the 100 Greatest Artists in Brazilian Music list by Rolling Stone Brasil, ranked 100th.

== Bibliography ==
- Carlos, Josely Teixeira (2007). Muito além de "apenas um rapaz latino-americano vindo do interior": investimentos interdiscursivos das canções de Belchior [Far beyond "just a Latin American guy from the countryside": interdiscursive investments in Belchior's songs]. Repositório UFC (Master's degree in Linguistics - specialisation in Discourse Analysis thesis) (in Brazilian Portuguese). Universidade Federal do Ceará.
- Carlos, Josely Teixeira (February 6, 2014). Fosse um Chico, um Gil, um Caetano: uma análise retórico-discursiva das relações polêmicas na construção da identidade do cancionista Belchior [Fosse um Chico, um Gil, um Caetano: a rhetorical-discursive analysis of polemical relations in the identity construction of the composer Belchior] (Ph.D. in Philology and the Portuguese Language thesis) (in Portuguese). São Paulo: Universidade de São Paulo. doi:10.11606/t.8.2014.tde-07102014-121114.
