= Azymuth =

Brazilian band

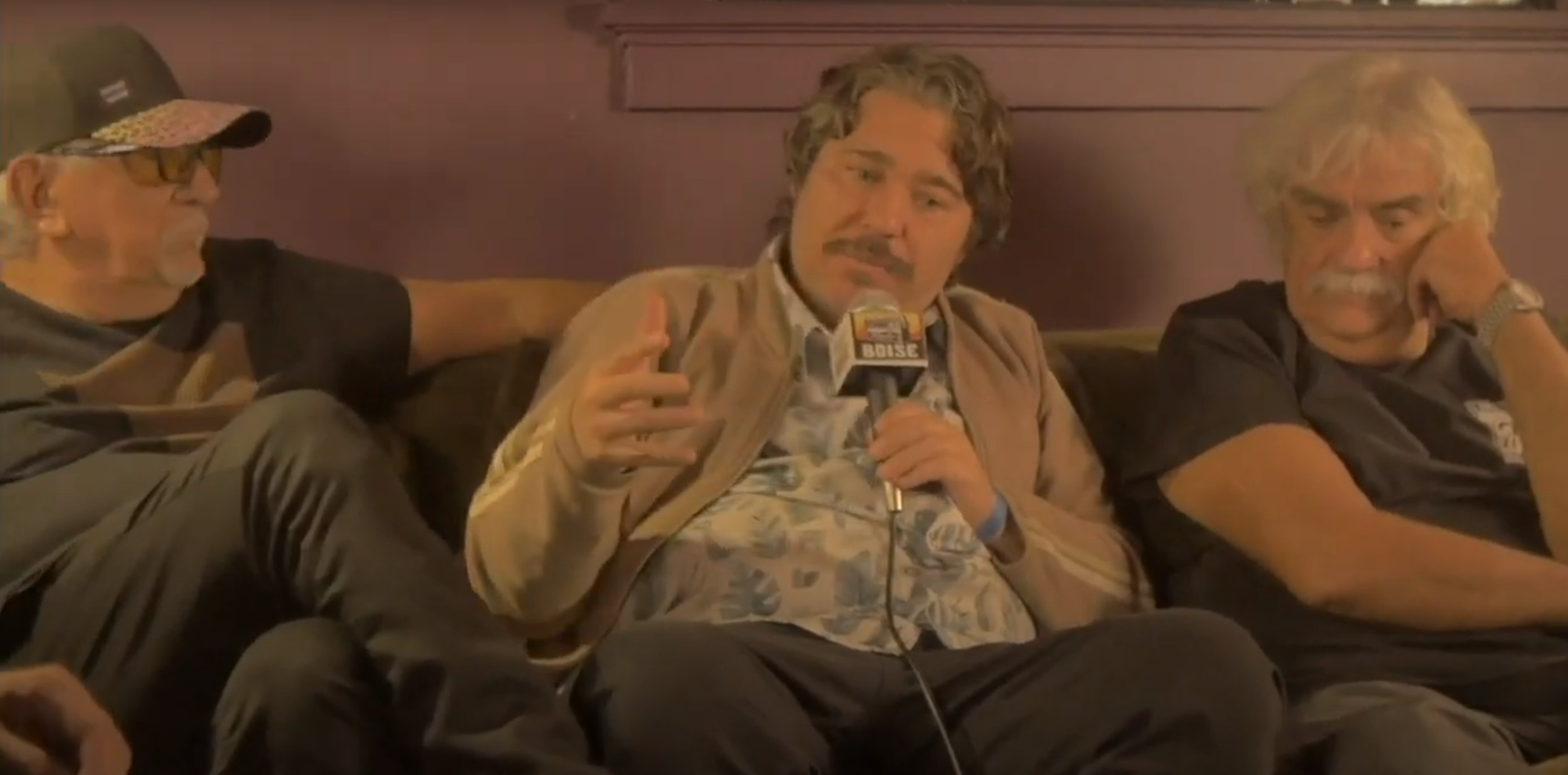
- Azymuth in 2019

Background information
- Origin: Rio de Janeiro, Brazil
- Genres: Jazz, samba, funk, jazz fusion, jazz-funk
- Years active: 1973–present
- Labels: Milestone Records; Far Out Recordings
- Members: Alex Malheiros; Dudu Viana; Renato Massa Calmon
- Past members: Ariovaldo Contesini; Jota Moraes; Marinho Boffa; José Roberto Bertrami; Fernando Moraes; Ivan Conti; Kiko Continentino

Azymuth is a Brazilian jazz-funk group formed in 1973. The original lineup was a trio composed of José Roberto Bertrami (keyboards), Alex Malheiros (bass, guitars), and Ivan Conti (drums, percussion). As of 2023, Malheiros leads the group as the only living member of the original trio.

== History ==
Bertrami, Malheiros, and Conti worked together as session musicians for other artists, notably, Marcos Valle. With Valle's approval, the group named themselves after one of the former's songs, Azimuth (renamed, Azymuth, since their sophomore album). Their first two albums were released under Som Livre. From 1979 to 1988, they released many albums for Milestone Records. They also had a major hit single with "Jazz Carnival", a product of their Light as a Feather album, in 1979. It peaked at number 19 in the UK Singles Chart in January 1980. Since the mid-1990s, they have released albums on the London based Far Out Recordings label while remaining based in Brazil, and they continue to tour in Europe.

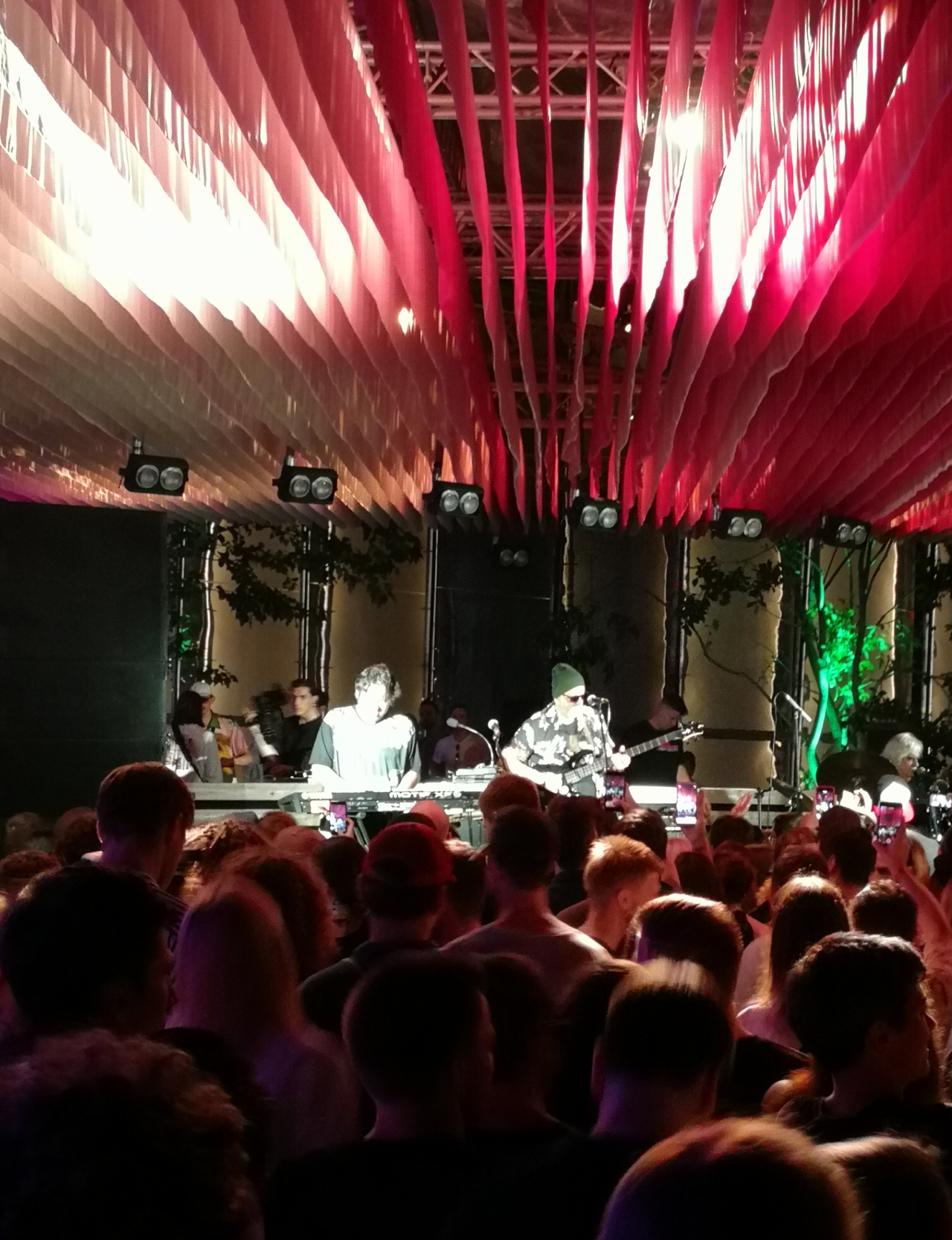
Azymuth performing in 2019

Azymuth have also been involved in producing albums and their artists have been involved in several other projects through the years, including an album by Brazilian singer-songwriter Ana Mazzotti, and the 2005 debut album, Equilibria, by Alex Malheiros's daughter Sabrina Malheiros. They call their music "Samba Doido", which means "Crazy Samba". Since the advent of the remix, many of Azymuth's songs have been redone by a wide range of artists and musicians. Several electronic acts like Jazzanova among many others, can be heard remixing their works.

Bertrami died on 8 July 2012 at age 66. He was succeeded by Kiko Continentino in 2015, who was then succeeded by Dudu Viana.

On 17 April 2023, it was reported that Conti had died. Drummer Renato "Massa" Calmon joined the band as Conti's successor 2 months afterwards.

== Solo careers ==
Ivan "Mamão" Conti has released several solo records, including The Human Factor (Milestone, 1984). In 2008, Conti and hip-hop musician Madlib released an album as "Jackson-Conti" titled Sujinho.

Alex Malheiros has released Atlantic Forest (Milestone, 1985), Zenith (Niterói Discos, 1992) and The Wave (Far Out, 2009).

Bertrami had the largest solo career. His album Things Are Different (Far Out Recordings, 2001) featured Robertinho Silva among others.

== Other members ==
- Ariovaldo Contesini was the original fourth member and percussionist. He provided percussion during the recording session of the Azimuth EP and album in 1975. However, Contesini left the band shortly after completing the album.
- Jota Moraes filled in for Bertrami on keys after the former left the group in 1989. He recorded as a member of Azymuth for the next two albums after the former's departure.
- Marinho Boffa joined Azymuth in recording sessions with German saxophonist Jürgen Seefelder.
- Fernando Moraes played on keys after Bertrami's death from 2012-2014. He's the brother of Jota Moraes.

== Discography ==
=== Pre-Azymuth ===
==== Studio albums ====
- 1972: Som Ambiente - CID Entertainment (with Marcos Valle, credited as 'Som Ambiente')
- 1972: Brazil by Music Fly Cruzeiro - Serviços Aéreos Cruzeiro do Sul ('uncredited')

==== Single ====
- 1972: "Concerto para um Verão" / "The Girl from Paramaribo" (with Marcos Valle, credited as 'Alan and his Orchestra')

=== As Azymuth ===
==== Original motion picture soundtrack ====
- 1973 - O Fabuloso Fittipaldi - Philips Records (with Marcos Valle)

==== Studio albums ====
- 1975: Azimüth (original issue on Som Livre) - 2CD reissue on Far Out Recordings
- 1977: Aguia Não Come Mosca (Atlantic)
- 1979: Light as a Feather (Milestone)
- 1979: Live at the Copacabana Palace (Isis)
- 1980: Dear Prelude (Compilation)
- 1980: Outubro (Milestone)
- 1982: Cascades (Milestone)
- 1982: Telecommunication (Milestone)
- 1984: Rapid Transit (Milestone)
- 1984: Flame (Milestone)
- 1985: Spectrum (Milestone)
- 1986: Tightrope Walker (Milestone)
- 1986: Night Mood: The Music of Ivan Lins (Milestone) with Mark Murphy
- 1987: Crazy Rhythm (Milestone)
- 1988: Carioca (Milestone)
- 1989: Tudo Bem (Intima)
- 1990: Curumim (Intima)
- 1991: Volta a Turma
- 1994: 21 Anos
- 1996: Carnival (Far Out)
- 1998: Woodland Warrior (Far Out)
- 1999: Pieces of Ipanema (Far Out)
- 2000: Before We Forget (Far Out)
- 2002: Partido Novo (Far Out)
- 2004: Brazilian Soul (Far Out)
- 2006: Pure: The Far Out Years 1995-2006 (Far Out)
- 2008: Butterfly (Far Out)
- 2011: Aurora (Far Out)
- 2016: Fênix (Far Out)
- 2019: Demos (1973-1975), Vol. 1 & 2 (Far Out)
- 2020: Azymuth JID004 (Jazz Is Dead) with Adrian Younge and Ali Shaheed Muhammad
- 2025: Marca Passo (Far Out)
