= Madlib discography =

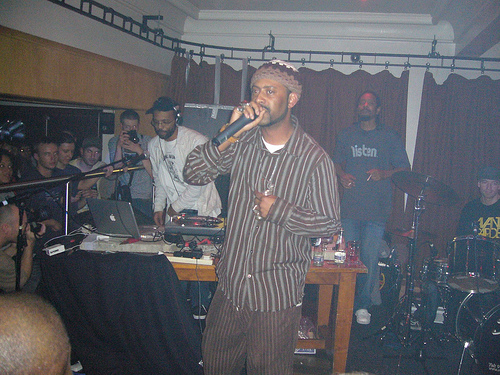
- Madlib performing in December 2005
- Studio albums: 24
- EPs: 7

The following is a list of Madlib releases under that name or Yesterdays New Quintet, a fictional jazz group created by Madlib.

Madlib began his career with Lootpack, a hip hop group. Later in his career he was a member of Jaylib and Madvillain. Quasimoto is a duo made up of him & Lord Quas, a fictional rapper created by pitching up Madlib's own voice. Under that name he released three albums, in 2000, 2005 and 2013. Madlib also released a house/techno album under the name DJ Rels titled Theme for a Broken Soul. Other notable collaborations include Dudley Perkins, with whom he has produced 3 entire albums. Madlib has released 3 multiple-volume album series: Beat Konducta (Vol. 0–6), Mind Fusion (Vol. 1–5) and Madlib Medicine Show (Vol. 1–13)

== As Madlib ==
=== Albums ===
==== Studio albums ====
Release date	Title	Label	Notes
November 4, 2002	Blunted in the Bomb Shelter	Antidote Records	Reggae/Ska/Dub Mix
June 24, 2003	Shades of Blue	Blue Note	Jazz remixes
October 7, 2003	Champion Sound	Stones Throw	with Jay Dee, as Jaylib
2004	Theme for a Broken Soul	Stones Throw	Under the name DJ Rels
2004	Madlib Remixes 2 (1980s Saturday Morning Edition)	Self-released (US); Le Smoke Disque (France)	2x 12"
September 30, 2008	WLIB AM: King of the Wigflip	BBE/Rapster	
June 17, 2008	Sujinho	Kindred Spirits (Netherlands); Mochilla (US)	as Jackson Conti
July 15, 2014	Rock Konducta Vol. 1-2	Madlib Invazion	
January 29, 2021	Sound Ancestors	Madlib Invazion Records	Arranged by Kieran Hebden

==== Collaborative albums ====
List of collaborative albums, with selected chart positions
Title	Album details	Peak chart positions					
Title	Album details	US	US R&B/HH	US Rap	US Indie	UK	UK R&B
Liberation (with Talib Kweli)	Released: March 20, 2007; Label: Blacksmith; Format: CD, LP, digital download	—	—	—	—	—	—
Piñata (with Freddie Gibbs)	Released: March 18, 2014; Label: Madlib Invazion; Formats: CD, LP, cassette, digital download	39	11	7	66	142	16
Bad Neighbor (with M.E.D. and Blu)	Released: October 30, 2015; Label: Bang Ya Head; Format: CD, LP, digital download	—	30	21	41	—	—
Bandana (with Freddie Gibbs)	Released: June 28, 2019; Label: Madlib Invazion, Keep Cool, RCA; Formats: CD, LP, cassette, digital download	21	13	10	—	88	—
The Professionals (with Oh No as The Professionals)	Released: January 17, 2020; Label: Madlib Invazion; Formats: CD, LP, digital download	—	—	—	—	—	—
In the Beginning, Vol. 1 (with Declaime)	Released: July 2, 2021; Label: Someothaship Connect; Formats: CD, LP, digital download	—	—	—	—	—	—
In the Beginning, Vol. 2 (with Declaime)	Released: August 26, 2022; Label: Someothaship Connect, Fat Beats; Formats: CD, LP, digital download	—	—	—	—	—	—
Flying High (with LMNO, M.E.D., and Declaime as LMD)	Released: September 2, 2022; Label: Bang Ya Head ENT.; Formats: CD, LP, digital download	—	—	—	—	—	—
Liberation 2 (with Talib Kweli)	Released: March 6, 2023; Label: Luminary; Formats: streaming	—	—	—	—	—	—

=== Extended plays ===
List of extended plays
Title	EP details
Madlib Invazion	Released: 2000; Label: Stones Throw
Madlib Remixes EP	Released: 2000; Label: No Label, Tapes Inc.

=== Series ===
Release Periods	Title	Label	Notes
2001–	Beat Konducta	Stones Throw, Madlib Invazion	Volumes 0 to 6 on Stones Throw, and continuing with non-numbered releases on Madlib Invazion
2004–2007	Mind Fusion	Mind Fusion Records	Volumes 1 to 5
Feb. 2010–March 2012	Madlib Medicine Show	Madlib Invazion Records	Volumes 1 to 13

=== Singles ===
Release Date	Title	Label	Notes
2001	"Bunky's Pick"	Stones Throw Records	with Cut Chemist and Billy Wooten
2001	"Head Lock"	Battle Axe Records	with LMNO
2002	"The Message/LAX To JFK"	Self-released	with J Dilla as Jaylib
2003	"Slim's Return"	Blue Note Records	
2003	"Madlib Invades Blue Note"	Blue Note Records	
2003	"Theme For Fergus"	Stones Throw Records; Kilmarnock Records	
2004	"Steppin' Again/Mindgames"	Blue Note Records; Ropeadope Records	with Donald Byrd and Rich Medina
2006	"Take It Back/Clap Your Hands"	Stones Throw Records	with Guilty Simpson
2008	"Go!/Gamble On Ya Boy"	BBE; Rapster Records	
2011	"Thuggin"	Madlib Invazion	with Freddie Gibbs
2013	"City"	Madlib Invazion; Adult Swim Singles	with Freddie Gibbs
2020	"Road of the Lonely Ones"	Madlib Invazion	
2021	"Hopprock"	Madlib Invazion	with Four Tet

== As Yesterdays New Quintet ==
=== Albums ===
Release Date	Title	Label	Notes
2001	Angles Without Edges	Stones Throw	
2004	Stevie	Stones Throw	
2004	A Tribute to Brother Weldon	Stones Throw	as Monk Hughes & The Outer Realm
2005	The Funky Side of Life	Stones Throw	as Sound Directions
2006	Summer Suite	Stones Throw	as The Last Electro-Acoustic Space Jazz & Percussion Ensemble
2007	Yesterdays Universe	Stones Throw	as various artists
2009	Fall Suite	Stones Throw	as The Last Electro-Acoustic Space Jazz & Percussion Ensemble
2010	Miles Away	Stones Throw	as The Last Electro-Acoustic Space Jazz & Percussion Ensemble
2010	Slave Riot	Stones Throw	as Young Jazz Rebels
2010	Space & Time	Orochon	as R.M.C.

=== EPs ===
Release Date	Title	Label	Notes
2001	Elle's Theme		
2001	The Bomb Shelter		
2001	Uno Esta EP		
2002	Experience		as Joe McDuphrey
2003	Say Ah!		as Ahmad Miller
2004	Ugly Beauty		as Malik Flavors
2007	Jewelz		as Otis Jackson Jr. Trio
2015	Trouble Knows Me		Collaboration with Hemlock Ernst
