= The F.D.R. Project (album) =

Studio album by The F.D.R. Project
- Released: (United States) June 19, 2007 (Europe) June 29, 2007 (Japan) July 24, 2007 (Canada) August 28, 2007
- Recorded: 2007
- Genre: Hip-Hop
- Label: Needillworks? Ent.
- Producer: Young RJ

The F.D.R. Project chronology
The EP (2007)	The F.D.R. Project (2007)

Singles from The F.D.R. Project
- 1. "Puff Puff Pass" Released: 2007

The F. D. R. Project (also known as The For Da Record Project) is an album by Frank N Dank and hip hop producer, Young RJ. This album is included on Frank N Dank and J Dilla's European Vacation CD/DVD.

The first single of the album is "Puff Puff Pass". The song was dedicated to their longtime friend, J Dilla.

== Track listing ==
Track listing
#	Title	Featured guest(s)	Composer(s)	Producer(s)
1	"Intro"		D. Harvey/F. Bush/R. Rice	Young RJ
2	"Love Is Here"		D. Harvey/F. Bush/R. Rice	Young RJ
3	"Make It Rain"		D. Harvey/F. Bush/R. Rice	Young RJ
4	"Puff Puff Pass"		D. Harvey/F. Bush/R. Rice	Young RJ
5	"Turn It Up"		D. Harvey/F. Bush/R. Rice	Young RJ
6	"Only For Players"	The Dramatics	D. Harvey/F. Bush/R. Rice/R. Banks/L.J. Reynolds/W. Ford/W. Kelly/M. Brock	Young RJ
7	"Blow (Interlude)"		D. Harvey/F. Bush/R. Rice	Young RJ
8	"Blow"		D. Harvey/F. Bush/R. Rice	Young RJ
