= O. J. Simpson (album) =

Studio album by Guilty Simpson
- Released: May 18, 2010
- Studio: Studio One (Livonia, MI)
- Genre: Hip-hop
- Length: 57:44
- Label: Stones Throw Records
- Producer: Peanut Butter Wolf (exec.); Guilty Simpson (exec.); Egon (exec.); Madlib

Guilty Simpson chronology
| Ode to the Ghetto (2008) | O. J. Simpson (2010) | Random Axe (2011) |

Madlib chronology
| Madlib Medicine Show (2010-2012) | O. J. Simpson (2010) | Thuggin' (2011) |

Professional ratings
Review scores
| Source | Rating |
|---|---|
| AllMusic | 3.5/5 stars |
| The A.V. Club | B+ |
| Consequence of Sound | C |
| Dusted Magazine | mixed |
| Exclaim! | favorable |
| HipHopDX | 3/5 stars |
| Impose Magazine | favorable |
| Pitchfork | 8/10 stars |
| PopMatters | 6/10 stars |
| Potholes in My Blog | 3.5/5 stars |

O. J. Simpson is the second solo studio album by American rapper Guilty Simpson from the Almighty Dreadnaughtz. It was released on May 18, 2010, via Stones Throw Records, and was produced entirely by Madlib. It also features guest appearances from Frank Nitty and Strong Arm Steady. The album peaked at #62 on the Top R&B/Hip-Hop Albums and #37 on the Heatseekers Albums in the U.S.

== Track listing ==
| No. | Title | Length |
|---|---|---|
| 1. | "Prelude" | 2:58 |
| 2. | "Introduction" | 1:11 |
| 3. | "O.J. Simpson" | 3:31 |
| 4. | "Pimp Rap" (Interlude) | 2:06 |
| 5. | "New Heights" | 2:47 |
| 6. | "Karma of a Kingpin" | 1:49 |
| 7. | "Think Twice" (Interlude) | 1:04 |
| 8. | "Coroner's Music" | 2:30 |
| 9. | "A Friend's Help" (Interlude) | 2:38 |
| 10. | "Back on the Road Again" | 1:56 |
| 11. | "Gone Crazy" (Interlude) | 1:44 |
| 12. | "Hood Sentence" | 3:12 |
| 13. | "The Preacher's Wife" (Interlude) | 0:45 |
| 14. | "Cali Hills" | 3:06 |
| 15. | "Something Bad" (Intermission One) | 4:25 |
| 16. | "Something Good" (Intermission Two) | 3:05 |
| 17. | "Scratch Warning" (featuring Frank) | 3:29 |
| 18. | "Hold Your Applause" (Interlude) | 1:41 |
| 19. | "Outside" (featuring Strong Arm Steady) | 3:10 |
| 20. | "Bow Wow" (Interlude) | 0:41 |
| 21. | "Mic Check 313" | 2:40 |
| 22. | "Trendsetters" | 1:55 |
| 23. | "100 Styles" | 2:51 |
| 24. | "Outro" | 1:31 |
| 25. | "Friends Only" (vinyl only bonus track) | 3:07 |

== Personnel ==
- Byron Simpson – main artist, executive producer
- Frank Bush – featured artist (track 17)
- Jason Smith – featured artist (track 19)
- Marvin P. Jones – featured artist (track 19)
- Otis Jackson, Jr. – producer, mixing
- Eothen Aram Alapatt – executive producer, A&R
- Chris Manak – executive producer
- Tommy Hoffman – mixing & recording
- Kelly Hibbert – mixing & mastering
- Jeremy Deputat – art direction & photography
- Eugene Howell – management

== Charts ==
| Chart (2010) | Peak position |
|---|---|
| US Top R&B/Hip-Hop Albums (Billboard) | 62 |
| US Heatseekers Albums (Billboard) | 37 |
