= The Further Adventures of Lord Quas =

- Original cover. Later reissues and digital releases show a slightly different cover.

Studio album by Quasimoto
- Released: May 3, 2005
- Genres: Hip-hop; psychedelic rap
- Length: 66:18
- Label: Stones Throw
- Producer: Madlib

Quasimoto chronology
The Unseen (2000)	The Further Adventures of Lord Quas (2005)	Yessir Whatever (2013)

Alternative cover
- Album cover used on streaming services and later reissues.

Singles from The Further Adventures of Lord Quas
- 1. "Bus Ride" Released: 2005

Professional ratings
Aggregate scores
Source	Rating
Metacritic	79/100
Review scores
Source	Rating
AllMusic	4.5/5 stars
The Austin Chronicle	3.5/5 stars
BBC	unfavorable
Exclaim!	mixed
IGN	7.5/10
Phoenix New Times	unfavorable
Pitchfork Media	7.0/10
Stylus Magazine	A−
XLR8R	favorable

The Further Adventures of Lord Quas is the second and final studio album by Quasimoto, a hip hop duo composed of Madlib and his animated alter ego, Lord Quas. It was released via Stones Throw Records on May 3, 2005. Stones Throw labelmates MF Doom and M.E.D. are featured on the album. Further Adventures is the only Quasimoto album that managed to chart in the United States, with the album peaking at #174 on the Billboard 200.

== Background and content ==
Stones Throw Records wrote about the album, saying that it plays out like a "smoked out Blaxploitation flick". Many of the songs were created or based on one of Quasimoto's main inspirations, Melvin Van Peebles. (Peebles is credited as a songwriter in the vinyl and CD liner notes). Madlib used the Boss SP-303 drum machine and sampler for this album, which he has used in the past for his Madvillainy and Jaylib albums, as well as his Theme for a Broken Soul album. There was only one music video for the project, "Rappcats Pt. 3", which was uploaded on Madlib's Rappcats website.

According to Jeff Jank, the art director for Stones Throw, he gave J Dilla (one of Madlib's close friends and labelmates) a CD-R of the finished version of Further Adventures when Dilla was hospitalized, after he finished his album Donuts, which he gave to Jank.

== Album cover ==
The album cover was designed by Jeff Jank. It features multiple references and people, including Madlib himself, Madlib's close associates M.E.D and J Dilla, a Draag from the movie Fantastic Planet smoking, Wild Man Fischer, the "ghost of Sun Ra", that "illuminates from down the hall", the speech bubble seen on the cover of The Mothers of Invention album Freak Out!, and Lord Quas "thinking of new ways to cook Top Ramen".On the cover, Lord Quas has a "Kool-Aid red" color instead of the signature yellow.

== Reception ==
The Further Adventures of Lord Quas received positive reviews from critics. At Metacritic, which assigns a weighted average score out of 100 to reviews from mainstream critics, the album received an average score of 79% based on 23 reviews, indicating "generally favorable reviews".

Jonathan Forgang of Stylus Magazine gave the album a grade of A−, saying, "The Further Adventures of Lord Quas features some of Madlib's most difficult and most accomplished production work to date."

Pitchfork writer Jamin Warren gave a mixed review. He wrote that in the "27 track album", there's a "damn strong record", but said that it takes "a lot of fast-forwarding to find it".

== Reissues ==
In 2021, Stones Throw reissued Further Adventures on vinyl with a new album cover, and a exclusive colored vinyl and gatefold release from Vinyl Me, Please. Also in late 2021, the label released the "Gold Chains" edition, with a alternate album cover reminiscent of the Beatles Sgt. Pepper's album cover, and a colored vinyl.

== Track listing ==
- All tracks produced by Madlib.

No.	Title	Length
1.	"Bullyshit"	3:07
2.	"Greenery"	3:14
3.	"Crime"	1:20
4.	"Hydrant Game"	3:25
5.	"Don't Blink"	2:06
6.	"Players of the Game"	2:35
7.	"Bus Ride"	2:58
8.	"Closer" (featuring Madvillain)	3:02
9.	"Maingirl"	4:01
10.	"Civilization Day"	1:50
11.	"Bartender Say"	2:46
12.	"1994"	2:22
13.	"Another Demo Tape"	1:46
14.	"Raw Deal"	2:17
15.	"Mr. Two-Faced"	1:34
16.	"The Exclusive" (featuring M.E.D.)	2:36
17.	"Fatbacks"	3:51
18.	"J.A.N. (Jive Ass Niggaz)"	1:54
19.	"Shroom Music"	3:01
20.	"Rappcats Pt. 3"	2:26
21.	"Strange Piano"	2:00
22.	"Life Is..."	2:19
23.	"The Clown (Episode C)"	2:59
24.	"Raw Addict Pt. 2"	2:34
25.	"Tomorrow Never Knows"	2:39
26.	"Privacy"	1:36

Notes

- Melvin Van Peebles is credited as a songwriter and feature on track 3, 4, 5, 7, 11, 15, 21, and 22

== Charts ==
Chart	Peak position
Billboard 200	174
Top R&B/Hip-Hop Albums	82
Independent Albums	12
Heatseekers Albums	7
