= Beat Konducta =

Album series by Madlib

Beat Konducta is an 8-album series released by hip-hop musician Madlib. "Beat Konducta" is also an alias which Madlib uses. The series began officially in 2006 with the release of Beat Konducta Vol 1-2: Movie Scenes. The album was stylistically a companion to (James Yancey) J Dilla's Donuts, which was released the month before, 3 days prior to Yancey's death. He has since followed with Beat Konducta Vol 3-4: Beat Konducta in India in 2007 and Beat Konducta Vol. 5-6: A Tribute to...(Dil Cosby and Dil Withers Suite) in 2008, which is a tribute to Yancey. Although the 2010 release Beat Konducta in Africa is an installment of the Madlib Medicine Show series, it is also considered a part of the Beat Konducta series.

== Volume 0 ==
Beat Konducta Vol. 0: Earth Sounds

Studio album by Madlib
- Released: 2001
- Genres: Instrumental hip-hop, remix, hip-hop
- Label: Stones Throw
- Producer: The Loopdigga

Madlib chronology
Angles Without Edges (2001)	Beat Konducta Vol. 0: Earth Sounds (2001)	Blunted in the Bomb Shelter (2002)

Beat Konducta Vol. 0: Earth Sounds or commonly known as Beat Conductor and Earth Sounds is the prequel project to the Beat Konducta instrumental albums by hip-hop producer Madlib. Recorded sometime around 1994 to 1996, these tracks were released on Stones Throw Records in 2001. This album was released in the format of two 7-inch EPs. It was also produced by Madlib under the alias of "The Loopdigga."

=== Track List ===
- Side A
1. "Earth Sounds"
2. "Conducted Rhythms"
3. "Collie And Beer"
- Side B
1. "Breaks of Meditate Pt. 1"
2. "Elements of Mr. Crabfeather"
3. "Blades"
- Side C
1. "Pike's Strike" (featuring Yesterdays New Quintet)
2. "Chops & Thangs"
3. "Lost Lust"
4. "Drama Scene #4"
- Side D
1. "Ashby Road"
2. "Soul Sonata"
3. "Mindtouch" (featuring Yesterdays New Quintet)

=== Samples ===
1. "Conducted Rhythms" contains samples of "Basketball Throwdown" by Cold Crush Brothers

== Volumes 1-2 ==
Beat Konducta Vol 1-2: Movie Scenes

Studio album by Madlib
- Released: March 21, 2006
- Genres: Hip-hop, Instrumental hip-hop
- Length: 59:19
- Label: Stones Throw Records
- Producer: Madlib

Madlib chronology
The Funky Side of Life (2005)	Beat Konducta Vol 1-2: Movie Scenes (2006)	Liberation (2007)

Professional ratings
Aggregate scores
Source	Rating
Metacritic	75/100
Review scores
Source	Rating
AllMusic	4/5 stars
HipHopDX	3.5/5 stars
Okayplayer	4/5 stars
Pitchfork	7/10
PopMatters	8/10

Beat Konducta Vol 1-2: Movie Scenes is an instrumental album by Madlib, an American hip-hop musician signed to Stones Throw Records. The album, entirely produced by Madlib under the alias of the Beat Konducta, is meant to be a soundtrack to a nonexistent movie in Madlib's imagination. The album boasts an extensive use of 1970s soul samples, but there are also hints of various soundtracks, rock and funk.

=== Track listing ===
Volume 1

1. "The Comeback (Madlib)"
2. "The Payback (Gotta)"
3. "Face the Sun (Africa)"
4. "Open (Space)"
5. "Tape Hiss (Dirty)"
6. "Sir Bang (Bounce)"
7. "Third Ear (More)"
8. "Stax (Strings)"
9. "Electric Company (Voltage-Watts)"
10. "Left on Silverlake (Ride)"
11. "Painted Pictures (Art)"
12. "Gold Jungle (Tribe)"
13. "Offbeat (Groove)"
14. "Pyramids (Change)"
15. "Eternal Broadcaster (Authentic)"
16. "Spanish Bells (High Dreams)"

Volume 2

1. "The Rock (Humps)"
2. "Box Top (Cardboard Dues)"
3. "West Zone (Coastin')"
4. "Filthy (Untouched)"
5. "Friends (Foes)"
6. "Toe Fat (Ghettozone)"
7. "Money Hugger (Gold Diggin')"
8. "The Comeup (Come Down)"
9. "Two Timer (The Pimp)"
10. "Chopstyle (Suey Blast)"
11. "Black Mozart (Opus II)"
12. "Understanding (Comprehension)"
13. "Snake Charmer (Heads Up)"
14. "Old Age (Youngblood)"
15. "Fukwitus (The Eights)"
16. "African Walk (Zamunda)"
17. "Whutkanido (Can Do It)"
18. "The Forest (Greens)"
19. "Outerlimit (Space Ho)"

=== Chart positions ===
- Beat Konducta Vol 1-2: Movie Scenes
  - Chart: Top Heatseakers
    - Peak position: 35
    - Year: 2006
  - Chart: Top Independent Albums
    - Peak position: 38
    - Year: 2006

=== Credits ===
- Executive producer: Peanut Butter Wolf
- Mastering: Dave Cooley, Kelly Hibbert
- Photography: B+
- Artwork & Design: Jeff Jank

== Volumes 3-4 ==
Beat Konducta Vol 3-4: Beat Konducta in India

Studio album by Madlib
- Released: August 28, 2007
- Genre: Hip-hop
- Label: Stones Throw Records
- Producer: Madlib

Madlib chronology
Yesterdays Universe (2007)	Beat Konducta Vol 3-4: Beat Konducta in India (2007)	Perseverance (2007)

Professional ratings
Review scores
Source	Rating
AllMusic	3.5/5 stars
Okayplayer	3.5/5 stars

Beat Konducta Vol 3-4: Beat Konducta in India is an instrumental album by Madlib, an American hip-hop musician signed to Stones Throw Records. The album, entirely produced by Madlib under the alias of the Beat Konducta, features hip-hop beats that use samples of Hindi film music.

=== Track listing ===
Volume 3

1. "Enter...Hot Curry" - 2:25
2. "Indian Hump" - 2:34
3. "Movie Finale" - 1:44
4. "Raw Tranquility Pt. 3" - 1:54
5. "Freeze" - 1:36
6. "Masala" - 1:08
7. "OnThatNewThing" - 1:31
8. "Indian Deli" - 1:47
9. "The Rumble" - 2:32
10. "Dancing Girls Theme" - 1:57
11. "Piano Garden" - 1:45
12. "Dark Alley Incidental Music" - 2:23
13. "Early Party" - 1:53
14. "Fifth Chant" - 1:32
15. "The Rip Off (Scene 3)" - 1:02
16. "Sitar Ride" - 2:23

Volume 4

1. "Get It Right" - 1:56
2. "More Rice" - 2:06
3. "Accordion for Raj" - 1:51
4. "Indian Bells" - 1:36
5. "Club Scene" - 1:27
6. "Duel" - 1:55
7. "Organ Stroll" - 1:20
8. "In the Cave" - 1:23
9. "Malfunction" - 1:08
10. "Victory" - 0:20
11. "Smoke Circle" - 1:42
12. "Raw Ground Wire" - 1:17
13. "New Bombay" - 2:11
14. "Shah Sound" - 1:54
15. "Another Getaway" - 2:24
16. "Main Title" - 1:31
17. "(Variations)" - 2:47
18. "No Sitar (Outro)" - 1:54

=== Chart positions ===
- Beat Konducta Vol 1-2: Movie Scenes
  - Chart: Top Heatseakers
    - Peak position: 11
    - Year: 2006

== Volumes 5-6 ==
Beat Konducta Vol 5-6

Studio album by Madlib
- Released: February 10, 2009
- Genre: Hip-hop
- Length: 67:19
- Label: Stones Throw Records
- Producer: Madlib

Madlib chronology
WLIB AM: King of the Wigflip (2008)	Beat Konducta Vol 5-6 (2009)	In Search of Stoney Jackson (2010)

Professional ratings
Review scores
Source	Rating
AllMusic	4/5 stars
Pitchfork	8.3/10

Beat Konducta Vol. 5-6: A Tribute to... (Dil Cosby and Dil Withers Suite) is an instrumental album produced by Madlib, an American hip-hop musician signed to Stones Throw Records. The album, along with J Rocc, is meant to be a tribute to his deceased friend J Dilla. This album boasts an extensive use of soul, jazz and funk samples.

=== Track listing ===
Volume 5

1. "For My Mans (Prelude)"
2. "The Mystery (Dilla's Still Here)"
3. "Beat Provider (Through the Years)"
4. "J's Day Theme #3 (Support)"
5. "In Jah Hands (Dilla's Lament)"
6. "Get Dollaz (24-7)"
7. "The String (Heavy Jones)"
8. "Two for Pay Jay (No Dough, No Show)"
9. "No More Time? (The Change)"
10. "Do You Know? (Transition)"
11. "Dirty Hop (The Shuffle)"
12. "Floating Soul (Peace)"
13. "Infinity Sound (Never Ending)"
14. "Sacrifice (Beat-a-Holic Thoughts)"
15. "Rebirth Cycle (Super Soul)"
16. "Rolled Peach Optimos (Call Day)"
17. "The Main Inspiration (Coltrane of Beats)"
18. "The Get Over (Move)"
19. "Shades of Pete (Super)"
20. "King Chop (Top Line)"
21. "Anthenagin' (?)"
22. "Dil Cosby Interlude"

Volume 6

1. "Dill Withers Theme"
2. "First Class (The Best Catalogue)"
3. "Lifetime (Lifeline)"
4. "The Electric Zone (Plugged In)"
5. "So Much (Music)"
6. "Smoked Out (Green Blaze Subliminal Sounds)"
7. "Another Bag of Bomb (No Seeds)"
8. "All Love (The Movement)"
9. "Detroit Playaz (Gator Walk)"
10. "Blast (Computer Rock)"
11. "J.B. and J.D. (Interlude)"
12. "Never Front (Ears Up)"
13. "Dillalade Ride (Contact High)"
14. "Suffer (Concentration)"
15. "Show Me the Good Life (Chip Stack)"
16. "Slapped Up (Snap n' Clap)"
17. "Another Batch (Play It Again)"
18. "Full Figure Pockets (Pay Jay)"
19. "Smoke Interlude (Hawaiian Punch)"
20. "The Sky (Beyond Sight)"

== Madlib Medicine Show #3: Beat Konducta in Africa ==
Medicine Show #3: Beat Konducta in Africa

Studio album by Madlib
- Released: March 23, 2010
- Genre: Afrobeat
- Length: 78:56
- Label: Madlib Invazion
- Producer: Madlib

Professional ratings
Review scores
Source	Rating
HipHopDX	3.5/5
Potholes In My Blog	3.5/5 stars

37-track instrumental hip-hop album produced by Madlib, inspired by and based on African records of the early 1970s – obscure & independent vinyl gems from afro-beat, funk, psych-rock, garage-rock & soul movements from different parts of Africa are all sampled to create a unique sound. The album also works as an installment in the Madlib Medicine Show series, a number of albums Madlib put outs featuring his instrumental work with a special theme for each LP.

=== Track List ===
1. "Motherland"
2. "The Frontline (Liberation)"
3. "Raw Introduction to Afreaka"
4. "African Voodoo Queen (Drama)"
5. "Jungle Soundz (Part One)"
6. "The Struggle to Unite (One Africa)"
7. "Mandingo Swing"
8. "Endless Cold (Lovelost)"
9. "Chant 2"
10. "Afrosound Panorama"
11. "Hunting Theme"
12. "Yafeu"
13. "Afritonic Pt. 1"
14. "Afritonic Pt. 2"
15. "Tradition"
16. "Spearthrow for Oh No"
17. "Tear Gas and Bullets for Freedom"
18. "Heritage Sip"
19. "Land of the Drum"
20. "Red, Black and Green Showcase"
21. "Blackfire"
22. "Obataive"
23. "Warrior's Theme"
24. "Mtima"
25. "African Map Watch"
26. "Street Hustler"
27. "Kanika"
28. "Chant 3"
29. "The Show (Inner View)"
30. "Brothers and Sisters"
31. "Freedom Play"
32. "African Bounce"
33. "Umi (Life)"
34. "Natural Sound Waves"
35. "Jungle Sounds Pt. 2"
36. "Mighty Force"
37. "Unika (Outro)"
38. "Bonus A"
39. "Bonus F"
40. "Bonus R"
41. "Bonus I"
42. "Bonus C"
43. "Bonus A (Amanaz)"
