= Madlib Remixes EP =

Madlib Remixes

EP by Madlib
- Released: 2000
- Recorded: 1998–2000
- Genre: Hip hop, remix
- Length: 21:08
- Label: No Label Records & Tapes Inc.
- Producer: Madlib

Madlib chronology
Madlib Invazion (2000)	Madlib Remixes (2000)	Angles Without Edges (2001)

Madlib Remixes is a compilation of early hip hop tracks remixed by hip hop producer Madlib released as a 12-inch EP in 2000. Madlib originally intended the remixes for personal use but decided to independently release them (No Label Records is just a comical reference). The vinyl LP was re-issued by Madlib on August 1, 2008.

== Track listing ==
All tracks mixed, produced, composed, and arranged by Madlib.

Dope Side (Side 1)
No.	Title	Length
1.	"Intro" (Madlib)	0:37
2.	"Universal Magnetic" (Mos Def)	3:34
3.	"The Look Of Love, Part 2 (Remix)" (T3)	1:23
4.	"Misery Needs Company (Remix)" (Noreaga)	1:03
5.	"Firewater (Remix)" (Big Pun)	1:51
6.	"Slang Editorial (Remix)" (Cappadonna)	1:45
7.	"Wanna Test (Remix)" (Lootpack and Medaphoar)	2:58

Phat Side (Side 2)
No.	Title	Length
1.	"Intro" (Madlib)	0:19
2.	"My World Premiere (Remix)" (Charizma & Peanut Butter Wolf)	1:21
3.	"Don't See Us (Remix)" (The Roots)	2:52
4.	"No Holds Barred (Remix)" (M.O.P.)	1:12
5.	"Just To Get A Rep (Remix)" (Gang Starr)	1:57
6.	"Interlude" (Madlib)	0:38
7.	"Car Horn (Remix)" (45 King and Common)	3:12
8.	"I’ve Known Rivers" (Gary Bertz Quartet)	2:07
