= Xtended Play =

Studio album by Frank-N-Dank
- Released: 2004
- Recorded: 2002–2004
- Genre: Hip hop
- Length: 46:57
- Label: Needillworks? Ent.
- Producer: J Dilla; Saukrates; P. Cauz; DJ Kemo; Oh No; Buddah Brothas; Kardinal Offishall; The 2 Swift Household; Tone Mason

Frank-N-Dank chronology
48 Hrs (2003)	Xtended Play (2004)	Xtended Play Version 3.13 (2006)

Professional ratings
Review scores
Source	Rating
RapReviews	8/10

Xtended Play is the second album by hip hop group Frank-n-Dank. Guest appearances include Brick & Lace, Kardinal Offishall, Saukrates and Lindo P. The album contains productions from Oh No, The 2 Swift Household, Kardinal Offishall, DJ Kemo, Buddah Brothas, Tone Mason, Saukrates, P. Cauz and J Dilla.

== Track listing ==
#	Title	Producer(s)	Featured guest(s)	Time
1	"Intro"			0:39
2	"Wit FND"	DJ Kemo		3:13
3	"Nice 2 Meet U"	Saukrates	Brick & Lace	3:35
4	"My City"	Oh No		2:58
5	"Off Da Hook"	Buddah Brothas		4:08
6	"Sexy"	The 2 Swift Household		3:51
7	"Let's Go"	J Dilla		3:07
8	"Bloaw"	Tone Mason	Lindo P	4:02
9	"Xotic Dancer"	Kardinal Offishall	Kardinal Offishall	3:19
10	"The Hustle"	Oh No		3:06
11	"Ride With Us"	Saukrates	Saukrates	3:51
12	"Okay"	J Dilla		3:46
13	"I Need That"	P. Cauz		3:13
14	"MCA"	J Dilla	Reign	4:08
