= Microphone Mathematics =

Single by Quasimoto

from the album The Unseen
- Released: 1999
- Genre: Hip-hop
- Label: Stones Throw Records
- Producer(s): Madlib

Quasimoto singles chronology
"Hittin' Hooks" (1999)	"Microphone Mathematics" (1999)	"Basic Instinct" (2000)

"Microphone Mathematics" is the second single by Quasimoto, the rapping alter ego of Madlib. These tracks later appeared on his debut album The Unseen. On the album, however, "Discipline 99" was split into 2 tracks. Part 0 featured "Mr. Herb," while part 1 featured Wildchild of the Lootpack.

== Track listing ==
=== Side A ===
1. Microphone Mathematics
2. Discipline #99 (feat. The Lootpack)
3. Low Class Conspiracy (feat. Madlib)

=== Side B ===
1. Microphone Mathematics (Instrumental)
2. Discipline #99 (feat. The Lootpack) (Instrumental)
3. Low Class Conspiracy (feat. Madlib) (Instrumental)
