= The Unseen (album) =

Studio album by Quasimoto
- Released: June 13, 2000
- Genres: West Coast hip-hop; jazz rap; psychedelic rap; experimental hip-hop
- Length: 63:13
- Label: Stones Throw
- Producer: Madlib

Quasimoto chronology
The Unseen (2000)	The Further Adventures of Lord Quas (2005)

Singles from The Unseen
- 1. "Microphone Mathematics" Released: 1999; 2. "Come on Feet" Released: 2000; 3. "Basic Instinct" Released: 2000

The Unseen is the debut studio album by Quasimoto, a hip-hop duo composed of Madlib and his animated alter ego Lord Quas. It was released under Stones Throw Records on June 13, 2000. It was re-released in 2005 as a deluxe edition with a bonus CD containing the instrumental version of the album. The Unseen received critical acclaim at the time of its release, and is considered an essential album in underground hip-hop.

== Background ==
Madlib initially created Quasimoto in the 1990s as someone to rap over his beats, since he didn't like the dark sound of his voice. He made music as Quasimoto for his own private listening, but Peanut Butter Wolf, the head of Stones Throw Records, convinced him to release these recordings. Madlib was also on a psychedelic mushroom trip for a month while creating The Unseen, which in turn caused the album's psychedelic and hallucinogenic sound. According to Madlib, he was "real high" during the trip and conceived the character Lord Quas because of it. Madlib used the E-mu SP-1200 to produce the beats for the album.

On the cover, designed by Jeff Jank, features a completely different design of Quas, as a white, ghost-like silhouette. Madlib originally thought of Lord Quas as an unknown person or entity, but on the other hand, Jeff Jank thought of him as a yellow furry creature (due to the Microphone Mathematics single cover).

The album was co-mixed by Kut Masta Kurt and Peanut Butter Wolf. The cover was designed by Jeff Jank.

== Critical reception ==
Professional ratings
Review scores
Source	Rating
AllMusic	5/5 stars
Mojo	4/5 stars
Muzik	4/5
NME	8/10
Pitchfork	7.3/10 (2000); 8.5/10 (2005)
RapReviews	9/10
Spin	7/10

The Unseen received overwhelmingly positive reviews upon release. Nathan Rabin of The A.V. Club said, "The Unseen represents a dramatic leap forward for Madlib as a producer, as he integrates left-field, found-sound samples with dexterity and wit that brings to mind Prince Paul's consistently surprising production work." Meanwhile, Michaelangelo Matos of City Pages said, "The Unseen bursts with so much found material it's tempting to think Madlib changed his name to escape litigation, pilfering everything from Augustus Pablo to Melvin Van Peebles to enough jazz artists to fill a West Village loft".

Spin Magazine writer Neil Drumming wrote "Quas is not your typical thesaurus-hugging indie hop snob. Not exactly. When he's not rubbing your nose in his soul jazz imports, he's tweakin' em with subtle scratch fills, background babble, and transmogrifying drum patterns."

Steve Huey of AllMusic called it "one of the most imaginative albums of the new West Coast underground, a puzzling, psychedelic jazz-rap gem riddled with warped humor and fractured musical genius."

== Accolades ==
The Unseen ranked at number 17 on Spin's list of the best albums of 2000. Rhapsody ranked it at number seven on its "Hip-Hop's Best Albums of the Decade" list. In 2015, it ranked at number 29 on Fact's "100 Best Indie Hip-Hop Records of All Time" list. In that year, it was also listed by HipHopDX as one of the "30 Best Underground Hip Hop Albums Since 2000".

== In popular culture ==
The song "Low Class Conspiracy" was on the soundtrack for the video game Tony Hawk's Underground.

== Track listing ==
- All tracks produced by Madlib

No.	Title	Length
1.	"Welcome to Violence"	0:49
2.	"Bad Character"	1:56
3.	"Microphone Mathematics"	3:14
4.	"Basic Instinct"	2:10
5.	"Goodmorning Sunshine"	2:57
6.	"Discipline 99, Pt. 0" (featuring Mr. Herb)	2:32
7.	"Low Class Conspiracy"	2:26
8.	"Return of the Loop Digga"	3:46
9.	"Real Eyes"	3:22
10.	"Come on Feet"	3:35
11.	"Bluffin"	2:47
12.	"Boom Music"	2:47
13.	"MHBs"	2:02
14.	"Put a Curse on You"	1:46
15.	"Astro Black"	3:17
16.	"Green Power"	2:59
17.	"Jazz Cats, Pt. 1"	2:43
18.	"24-7" (featuring Medaphoar)	2:48
19.	"The Unseen"	2:53
20.	"Phony Game"	1:56
21.	"Astro Travellin"	2:58
22.	"Blitz"	1:16
23.	"Axe Puzzles"	2:34
24.	"Discipline 99, Pt. 1" (featuring Wildchild)	3:36
Total length:		63:13

== Personnel ==
Credits are adapted from the back cover.

- Madlib – production, vocals, mixing
- Peanut Butter Wolf, additional mixing
- Kut Masta Kurt, additional mixing
- Gene Grimaldi, mastering
- Jeff Jank, design and illustration
