= Quasimoto =

Hip-hop side project of producer/rapper Madlib

- Madlib performing in San Francisco in 2018 with Lord Quas drawn next to him

Background information
- Origin: Oxnard, California, U.S.
- Genres: Alternative hip-hop, psychedelic rap, trip hop, instrumental hip-hop
- Years active: 1999–2005; 2013
- Label: Stones Throw Records
- Members: Lord Quas; Madlib

Quasimoto was a side project of American hip-hop producer Madlib, from Oxnard, California. Quasimoto is composed of Madlib and his animated alter ego Lord Quas. Lord Quas is known for his high-pitched voice, which often interacts with Madlib's regular voice. Quasimoto was conceived one day in the studio, when Madlib decided to rap to his own beats. Madlib did not like the sound of his voice (his friends in Oxnard call him "Barry White" in reference to his deep voice), so he decided to slow his recorder down, rap slowly, then speed the recording back up to produce Lord Quas' distinctive high-pitched sound.

Quasimoto's lyrics frequently address themes such as violence and drug use in a comedic fashion, and the character of Lord Quas has been interpreted as a satirical take on gangsta-rap.

== History ==
Peanut Butter Wolf, DJ and owner of Stones Throw Records, heard Quas' demo tapes and encouraged Madlib to release more tracks under this alias. Quasimoto was featured on Wolf's My Vinyl Weighs a Ton album in 1998, on the song "Styles Crews Flows Beats". Later, Madlib put out Quasimoto's debut album, The Unseen, in 2000. This album received much praise from underground fans and from mainstream media, making it onto Spin Magazine's top albums of the year list.

Madlib's original idea for his character was to make him an "unknown person or entity", hence the title of Quasimoto's debut album, The Unseen. While the character was depicted as a humanoid white figure on The Unseen's album cover, the appearance of the character was changed after fans started identifying him as a creature holding a brick in the artwork for The Unseen (2000) by Jeff Jank. The illustrated character was first used on the cover of single Microphone Mathematics (1999) credited to Keith Beats.

Logo used on Microphone Mathematics 12-inch single (1999) and The Further Adventures of Lord Quas LP (2005)

After the release of The Unseen, Madlib spent the next few years working on different projects such as Yesterdays New Quintet and his album Shades of Blue. Quas re-emerged in 2003, making a few guest appearances, notably on Jaylib's Champion Sound and Madvillain's Madvillainy (Madlib and MF Doom). Quasimoto officially returned with the vinyl-only Bus Ride EP in 2005, continuing his distinctive style of high pitched rhymes and unorthodox samples.

In 2005, Quasimoto dropped The Further Adventures of Lord Quas which featured M.E.D. and MF Doom. The album cover features a reference to Frank Zappa's debut album, Freak Out!, a picture of super-producer J Dilla, and a picture of Wild Man Fischer, who is also referenced in one of the songs. The voice of Melvin Van Peebles is sampled on several tracks from both albums.

In June 2013, the compilation album Yessir Whatever was released. It was said to be "a collection of 12 tracks made over a roughly 12-year period," however there were no new Quasimoto recordings made after the year 2005. Some tracks were released on rare and out-of-print vinyls while others were previously unreleased, being mixed and mastered for the first time specifically for the compilation.

== Influences ==
In an interview, Madlib said that the atmosphere and sound on the Quasimoto albums owe much to the work of Alain Goraguer on the soundtrack of La Planète sauvage. An early Quasimoto video features excerpts from the film, and the song "Come on Feet" contains a sample from its soundtrack.

== Discography ==
=== Studio albums ===
- The Unseen (2000)
- The Further Adventures of Lord Quas (2005)

=== Compilation albums ===
- Yessir Whatever (2013)

=== Singles ===
- "Hittin' Hooks" (1999)
- "Microphone Mathematics" (1999)
- "Basic Instinct" (2000)
- "Come On Feet" (2000)
- "Astronaut" (2002)
- "Broad Factor" (2004)
- "Bus Ride" (2005)
- "The Front / Youngblood" (2005)
- "Bullysh!t/Seasons Change" (2005)
