= Yessir Whatever =

2013 compilation album by Quasimoto & Madlib

- Standard cover. The CD and vinyl releases come in all different colors

Compilation album by Quasimoto
- Released: June 18, 2013
- Genre: Hip hop
- Length: 32:58
- Label: Stones Throw
- Producer: Madlib

Quasimoto chronology
The Further Adventures of Lord Quas (2005)	Yessir Whatever (2013)

Professional ratings
Aggregate scores
Source	Rating
Metacritic	69/100
Review scores
Source	Rating
AllMusic	3.5/5 stars
Exclaim!	6/10
Pitchfork Media	7.4/10
PopMatters	7/10
Rolling Stone	3/5 stars

Yessir Whatever is a compilation album by American hip-hop duo Quasimoto, which is composed of Madlib and his animated alter ego Lord Quas. The album was released on June 18, 2013, by Stones Throw Records.

== Content ==
The album features a compilation of songs released on rare & out-of-print vinyl and a few others that were previously unreleased.

== Packaging ==
On the CD and vinyl releases, there's a sticker of Lord Quas in the middle, and when unraveled, it shows Lord Quas' bodily organs, which is filled up with items like food and multiple weapons.

== Reception ==
On Metacritic, the album received a 69 out of 12 reviews, which indicates "generally favorable reviews".

== Track listing ==
- All tracks produced by Madlib

No.	Title	Length
1.	"Broad Factor"	2:45
2.	"Seasons Change"	2:51
3.	"The Front"	2:55
4.	"Youngblood"	1:39
5.	"Astronaut"	2:09
6.	"Planned Attack"	2:50
7.	"Brothers Can't See Me"	2:32
8.	"Catchin' the Vibe"	2:43
9.	"Am I Confused?"	2:53
10.	"Sparkdala"	3:30
11.	"Green Power"	2:42
12.	"LAX to JFK"	3:23
