= Xtended Play Version 3.13 =

Studio album by Frank n Dank
- Released: October 24, 2006
- Recorded: 2002–2006
- Genre: Hip hop
- Length: 61:05
- Label: Needillworks? Ent., Chisel Sound
- Producer: The 2 Swift Household, Buddah Brothas, DJ Kemo, J Dilla, J-Swift, Kardinal Offishall, Lancecape, Oh No, P. Cauz, Rich Kidd, Saukrates, Tone Mason

Frank n Dank chronology
| Xtended Play (2004) | Xtended Play Version 3.13 (2006) | The EP (2007) |

Professional ratings
Review scores
| Source | Rating |
|---|---|
| Prefix | 5.5/10 |
| Plug One | 3.5/5 stars |

Xtended Play Version 3.13 is the third studio album by Detroit-based hip hop duo Frank n Dank, released on October 24, 2006. The album features production from the likes of J Dilla, Oh No and Rich Kidd, and includes guest appearances from Brick & Lace, Kardinal Offishall, Saukrates, Jeru the Damaja and more.

== Track listing ==
| # | Title | Featured guest(s) | Producer(s) | Time |
|---|---|---|---|---|
| 1 | "Okay" | | J Dilla | 3:33 |
| 2 | "The Hustle" | DJ Kemo | Oh No | 3:05 |
| 3 | "Blaow" | Lindo P | Tone Mason | 3:39 |
| 4 | "What Up" | | Lancecape | 2:31 |
| 5 | "My City" | | Oh No | 2:31 |
| 6 | "Nice 2 Meet U ('06 Version)" | Brick & Lace | Saukrates | 4:07 |
| 7 | "Sexy" | DJ Dopey | The 2 Swift Household | 3:51 |
| 8 | "The Get Right Song" | | Rich Kidd | 3:58 |
| 9 | "Wit FND" | | DJ Kemo | 2:45 |
| 10 | "Off Da Hook" | | Buddah Brothas | 4:10 |
| 11 | "Xotic Dancer" | Kardinal Offishall | Kardinal Offishall | 3:10 |
| 12 | "Ride With Us" | Saukrates | Saukrates | 3:24 |
| 13 | "Let's Go" | | J Dilla | 2:58 |
| 14 | "Worldwide" | Jeru the Damaja | The 2 Swift Household | 3:07 |
| 15 | "M.C.A. (Music Cemetery of America)" | Reign | J Dilla | 2:59 |
| 16 | "I Need That" | | P. Cauz | 2:37 |
| 17 | "Nice 2 Meet U (Original Version)" | Brick & Lace | Saukrates | 3:30 |

== Bonus DVD ==
- The Frank N Dank Story
- McNasty Filth (Music video)
- M.C.A. (Music video)
- What Up (Music video)
- FND (Live)

== Singles ==
Single information
"What Up"
- Released: September 8, 2006
- B-side: "The Hustle"
"Nice 2 Meet U ('06 Version)"
- Released: October 10, 2006
- B-side: "M.C.A."

== Personnel ==
Credits for Xtended Play Version 3.13 adapted from AllMusic.

- Frank n Dank — Primary Artist
- Brick & Lace — Featured Artist
- Buddah Brothas — Producer
- P. Cauz — Producer
- Jeru the Damaja — Featured Artist
- J Dilla — Producer
- DJ Dopey — Featured Artist
- The 2 Swift Household — Producer
- DJ Kemo — Producer, Featured Artist
- Rich Kidd — Producer
- Scott "Watson" Lake — Mastering
- Lancecape — Producer
- Tone Mason — Producer
- Oh No — Producer
- Kardinal Offishall — Featured Artist, Producer
- Lindo P — Featured Artist
- Reign — Featured Artist
- Saukrates — Featured Artist, Producer
- Brett Zilahi — Mastering
