= WLIB AM: King of the Wigflip =

Studio album by Madlib
- Released: September 29, 2008
- Genre: Hip-hop
- Length: 64:01
- Label: BBE; Rapster
- Producer: Madlib; Karriem Riggins

Madlib chronology
Madvillainy 2: The Madlib Remix (2008)	WLIB AM: King of the Wigflip (2008)	Beat Konducta Vol. 5-6: A Tribute to... (2009)

WLIB AM: King of the Wigflip is a studio album by American hip-hop musician Madlib. It was released on BBE and Rapster on September 29, 2008. It is the final installment of BBE's Beat Generation series.

== Critical reception ==
Professional ratings
Aggregate scores
Source	Rating
Metacritic	72/100
Review scores
Source	Rating
AllMusic	4/5 stars
The A.V. Club	B+
Pitchfork	7.3/10
PopMatters	6/10 stars
The Skinny	4/5 stars
Spin	6/10

At Metacritic, which assigns a weighted average score out of 100 to reviews from mainstream critics, the album received an average score of 72, based on 13 reviews, indicating "generally favorable reviews".

== Track listing ==
No.	Title	Producer(s)	Length
1.	"The New Resident" (performed by The Beat Konducta)	Madlib	1:33
2.	"Blow the Horns on 'Em" (performed by Guilty Simpson)	Madlib	2:32
3.	"The Plan Pt. 1" (performed by Georgia Anne Muldrow)	Madlib	2:37
4.	"Tension" (performed by The Beat Konducta)	Madlib	1:32
5.	"Gamble on Ya Boy" (performed by Defari)	Madlib	4:37
6.	"The Ox (805)" (performed by MED featuring Poke)	Madlib	2:57
7.	"All Virtue" (performed by The Beat Konducta)	Madlib	1:49
8.	"Blindfold Test #10 (He Don't Play)" (performed by J Rocc)	Madlib	3:54
9.	"The Thang-Thang" (performed by Prince Po)	Madlib	3:03
10.	"Heat" (performed by Madlib)	Madlib, Karriem Riggins	3:57
11.	"Smoke Break" (performed by The Beat Konducta)	Madlib	1:58
12.	"The Plan (Reprise)" (performed by The Beat Konducta)	Madlib	0:39
13.	"Life" (performed by Karriem Riggins)	Madlib	1:32
14.	"Parklight" (performed by The Beat Konducta)	Madlib	1:44
15.	"Yo Yo Affair Pt. 1 & 2" (featuring Frezna)	Madlib	4:01
16.	"I Want It Back" (performed by The Professionals)	Madlib	2:54
17.	"Disco Dance" (performed by The Beat Konducta)	Madlib	1:51
18.	"What It Do" (performed by Liberation)	Madlib	3:36
19.	"Take That Money" (performed by Roc C featuring Oh No)	Madlib	3:55
20.	"Drinks Up!" (performed by Frank n Dank)	Madlib	2:48
21.	"The Way That I Live" (performed by Stacy Epps)	Madlib	4:10
22.	"Ratrace" (performed by Murs)	Madlib	2:05
23.	"Go!" (performed by Guilty Simpson)	Madlib	3:07
24.	"Stop" (performed by The Beat Konducta)	Madlib	1:10

== Charts ==
Chart (2008)	Peak position
US Heatseekers Albums (Billboard)	9
