= Madlib Medicine Show =

Album series by Madlib

Madlib Medicine Shows
- The Brick box set

Studio album series by Madlib
- Released: February 2010 – March 2012
- Recorded: 2009–2012
- Genres: Hip-hop, jazz, jazz fusion, progressive rock, reggae, soul, disco, funk
- Label: Madlib Invazion
- Producer: Madlib

Madlib chronology
In Search of Stoney Jackson (2010)	Madlib Medicine Shows (2010)	O. J. Simpson (2010)

Madlib Medicine Show was a 13-album series by Madlib originally scheduled to be released monthly on his own imprint, Madlib Invazion throughout 2010 and into 2011. Odd months present releases featuring Madlib's production work while even months showcase DJ work and mixing skills.

It was originally planned to be only 12 albums and mixtapes, however a secret Medicine Show titled Medicine Show #13: Black Tape was released in March 2012, to complete the Madlib Medicine Show series.

== #1: Before the Verdict ==
Medicine Show #1: Before the Verdict

Studio album by Madlib
- Released: February 2, 2010
- Genre: Hip-hop
- Length: 59:15
- Label: Madlib Invazion
- Producer: Madlib

Professional ratings
Review scores
Source	Rating
AllMusic	3.5/5 stars
Potholes In My Blog	2.5/5 stars
Prefix	(5.0/10)
XLR8R	(7.5/10)
Therhapsodist	(favorable)

Madlib Medicine Show #1 contains original tracks as well as "OJ Simpson remixes" of tracks from Guilty Simpson's debut album Ode to the Ghetto. It is considered a prelude to Madlib and Guilty's collaboration album O.J. Simpson released in May 2010. There are two brief guest appearances; one by J Dilla, in a short, previously unreleased interlude dating back to his & Madlib's first collaboration and the other by MED, who is the sole voice on the short "The Exclusive", a theme song that first appeared on Jaylib's Champion Sound album where Percee P did "The Exclusive" interlude.

As of May 2011, this album's vinyl edition is back in print after the initial 1000 copies sold out at release.

=== Track List ===
1. "Arraignment (Intro)"
2. "Ode to the Ghetto (OJ Simpson Remix)"
3. "Yikes (OJ Simpson Remix)"
4. "Further"
5. "Lucky Guy"
6. "Pigs (OJ Simpson Remix)"
7. "Life Goes By"
8. "Get Bitches (OJ Simpson Remix)"
9. "The Exclusive"
  - Performed by M.E.D.
10. "Robbery (OJ Simpson Remix)"
11. "Kill 'Em (OJ Simpson Remix)"
12. "The Paper"
13. "I Must Love You (OJ Simpson Remix)"
14. "Looking For Trouble"
15. "Young Guns"
  - Featuring J Dilla
16. "My Moment (OJ Simpson Remix)"
17. "American Dream & Future (OJ Simpson Remix)"

== #2: Flight to Brazil ==
Medicine Show #2: Flight to Brazil

Mixtape by Madlib
- Released: February 8, 2010
- Genres: Funk carioca, jazz, psychedelic rock, progressive rock
- Length: 79:31
- Label: Madlib Invazion
- Producer: Madlib

Professional ratings
Review scores
Source	Rating
AllMusic	4/5 stars
Rapreviews	(7.0/10)

"...is your ticket out of this hell hole and onto an 80-minute guided tour through three or four decades of Brazilian funk, psychedelic, prog-rock and jazz."

The CD's audio has been divided into 9 tracks.

=== Track List ===
1. "Rio de Janeiro"
2. "Sao Paulo"
3. "Belo Horizonte"
4. "Porto Alegre"
5. "Salvador"
6. "Recife"
7. "Fortaleza"
8. "Brasília"
9. "Curitiba"

== #3: Beat Konducta in Africa ==
Medicine Show #3: Beat Konducta in Africa

Studio album by Madlib
- Released: March 23, 2010
- Genre: Afrobeat
- Length: 78:56
- Label: Madlib Invazion
- Producer: Madlib

Professional ratings
Review scores
Source	Rating
HipHopDX	(3.5/5)
Potholes In My Blog	3.5/5 stars

37-track instrumental hip-hop album produced by Madlib, inspired by and based on African records of the early 1970s – obscure & independent vinyl gems from afro-beat, funk, psych-rock, garage-rock & soul movements from different parts of Africa are all sampled to create a unique sound. The album also works as an installment in Madlib's Beat Konducta series, a number of albums Madlib put outs featuring his instrumental work with a special theme for each LP.

=== Track List ===
1. "Motherland"
2. "The Frontline (Liberation)"
3. "Raw Introduction to Afreaka"
4. "African Voodoo Queen (Drama)"
5. "Jungle Soundz (Part One)"
6. "The Struggle to Unite (One Africa)"
7. "Mandingo Swing"
8. "Endless Cold (Lovelost)"
9. "Chant 2"
10. "Afrosound Panorama"
11. "Hunting Theme"
12. "Yafeu"
13. "Afritonic Pt. 1"
14. "Afritonic Pt. 2"
15. "Tradition"
16. "Spearthrow for Oh No"
17. "Tear Gas and Bullets for Freedom"
18. "Heritage Sip"
19. "Land of the Drum"
20. "Red, Black and Green Showcase"
21. "Blackfire"
22. "Obataive"
23. "Warrior's Theme"
24. "Mtima"
25. "African Map Watch"
26. "Street Hustler"
27. "Kanika"
28. "Chant 3"
29. "The Show (Inner View)"
30. "Brothers and Sisters"
31. "Freedom Play"
32. "African Bounce"
33. "Umi (Life)"
34. "Natural Sound Waves"
35. "Jungle Sounds Pt. 2"
36. "Mighty Force"
37. "Unika (Outro)"
38. "Bonus A"
39. "Bonus F"
40. "Bonus R"
41. "Bonus I"
42. "Bonus C"
43. "Bonus A (Amanaz)"

== #4: 420 Chalice All-Stars (AKA Son of Super Ape) ==
Medicine Show #4: 420 Chalice All-Stars

Studio album by Madlib
- Released: April 20, 2010
- Genres: Reggae, dub
- Length: 79:52
- Label: Madlib Invazion
- Producer: Madlib

Professional ratings
Review scores
Source	Rating
AllMusic	3.5/5 stars

"All Jamaican sounds. You're tuning to your boss D.J. Madlib. Musical disc from the flick of his wrist to make you jump and twist. Madlib control the fullest. Roots. rock. reggae. Good stuff, as I would say."

The CD's audio has been divided into 9 separate tracks.

=== Track List ===
1. "What Are the Medical Benefits of Smoking Marijuana?"
2. "What Are the Negative Risks of Smoking It?"
3. "What Alternatives Are There to Smoking?"
4. "Are a Lot of Pesticides on Pot?"
5. "Where Is All This Pot Coming From?"
6. "So What Does the Law Say About These Dispensaries and Their Various Pot Products?"
7. "How Much Pot Am I Allowed to Have at One Time?"
8. "How Do I Get a Prescription?"
9. "Will My Name End Up on Some DEA List?"

== #5: History of The Loop Digga, 1990–2000 ==
Medicine Show #5: History of the Loop Digga, 1990–2000

Studio album by Madlib
- Released: May 23, 2010
- Recorded: 1990–2000
- Genre: Hip-hop
- Length: 65:14
- Label: Madlib Invazion
- Producer: Madlib

Professional ratings
Review scores
Source	Rating
AllMusic	3/5 stars

Madlib Medicine Show #5 is a collection of previously unreleased Madlib production dating back to 1990 and stretches to 2000. Before he called himself The Beat Konducta, there was The Loop Digga, who made beats with his sampler in the basement known as Crate Digga's Palace. Beats were pulled from old beat tapes and floppy discs. The majority of the album is instrumental, but a few selections feature him rapping together with his Oxnard crew C.D.P., which also included his brother Oh No. A limited triple vinyl set was released featuring a bonus disc of 10 additional tracks from the same period.

=== Track List ===
1. "Warning (Intro)"
2. "Static Invazion"
3. "Stakeout"
4. "Rapper X Radio"
5. "Last Day's Music"
6. "Nothing from Nothing"
7. "Episode VII"
8. "Episode VIII"
9. "Episode IX"
10. "Episode X"
11. "Episode XI"
12. "Episode XII"
13. "Episode XIII"
14. "Episode XIV"
15. "Episode XV"
16. "Episode XVI"
17. "Episode XVII"
18. "Episode XVIII"
19. "Episode XIX"
20. "Episode XX"
21. "Further Adventures of Walkman Flavor"
22. "Episode XXII"
23. "Episode XXIII"
24. "Episode XXIV"
25. "Episode XXV"
26. "Episode XXVI"
27. "Episode XXVII"
28. "Live from Outer Space"
29. "Real Days"
30. "C.D.P. Assassins Pt. 1"
31. "C.D.P. Assassins Pt. 2 & 3"
32. "C.D.P. Assassins Pt. 4"
33. "C.D.P. Assassins Pt. 5"
34. "C.D.P. Assassins Pt. 6"

Madlib Medicine Show #5: Bonus Tracks

1. "On a Mission/Game Skit/Oh's Warning"
2. "Medicine Dub/Almost on Point/Rappin with Quas"
3. "D's Time/Phases/Whatchuthink"
4. "What's That? (Interlude)"
5. "Crate Digga Station"
6. "C.D.P. Assassins Pt. 7"
7. "Charlie Don't (Interlude)"
8. "Episode XLIII/Breakin' Shit Down"
9. "Episode XLIV/Raw Addict (Original Version)"
10. "I Said... (Outro)"

== #6: The Brain Wreck Show ==
Medicine Show #6: The Brain Wreck Show

Studio album by Madlib
- Released: June 22, 2010
- Recorded: 1968–1976
- Genres: Progressive rock, funk
- Length: 61:18
- Label: Madlib Invazion
- Producer: Madlib

"...is a 61-minute DJ mixtape of global psychedelic, progressive and hard rock & funk circa 1968–1976, culled from the isolated reaches of Madlib's 4-ton mountain of vinyl."

=== Track List ===
1. "World Leaders Plan Centralized Power & Remote Brain Control"
2. "It Has Widespread Support"
3. "Predicted 2000 Years Ago"
4. "It’s Almost Here"
5. "It Will Happen on 4/20"
6. "How to Avoid Being a Victim"
7. "Its Sudden and Complete Collapse Predicted"
8. "It Is Right on Time"
9. "The Real New Order"

== #7: High Jazz ==
Medicine Show #7: High Jazz

Studio album by Madlib and Yesterdays New Quintet
- Released: July 27, 2010
- Genres: Free jazz, jazz fusion
- Length: 61:29
- Label: Madlib Invazion
- Producer: Madlib

"The latest from Yesterdays Universe, produced and arranged by Madlib."

=== Track List ===
1. The Jackson Conti Band - "Steppin' into Tomorrow (Prelude)"
2. Generation Match - "Electronic Dimensions"
3. Jahari Massamba Unit - "Pretty Eyes"
4. The Kenny Cook Octet (Stanton Davis) - "High Jazz"
5. Yesterdays New Quintet - "Medley: Don't You Worry Bout a Thing (Live at Spear for the Moondog)"(Stevie Wonder & Miles Davis)
6. "Interlude"
7. The Big Black Foot Band feat. The Black Spirits - "Reality or Dream"
8. Russell Jenkins Jazz Express - "Drunk Again"
9. Poyser, Riggins & Jackson - "Funky Butt, Part 1"
10. Jahari Massamba Unit - "Wonderin'/Nightime"
11. R.M.C. - "Space & Time"
12. Yesterdays New Quintet - "Conquistador"
13. The Big Black Foot Band feat. The Black Spirits - "Tarzan's Theme"
14. "Interlude"
15. Joe McDuphrey Experience - "Kimo"

Madlib Medicine Show #7: Bonus Tracks

1. Jahari Massamba Unit - "Falling"
2. Yesterdays New Quintet - "Runnin' Fast (On the Runs)"
3. Sound Directions feat. Malcolm Catto - "Shady Cops"
4. The Eddie Prince Fusion Band - "The Struggle Is Over/Next Chapter"
5. O.D. - "Wasted (Themes Variations)"

== #8: Advanced Jazz ==
Medicine Show #8: Advanced Jazz

Studio album by Madlib
- Released: August 24, 2010
- Genres: Jazz fusion, free jazz, modal jazz, funk
- Length: 79:37
- Label: Madlib Invazion
- Producer: Madlib

Professional ratings
Review scores
Source	Rating
AllMusic	4/5 stars

"Imagine an 80-minute music history course taking place in a dusty, hazy studio with wall-to-wall jazz vinyl - records from the past 40 years – jazz, fusion, funky, obscure. This course will not be graded. There will be no lecture. Madlib’s at the turntable. Class is now in session."

=== Track List ===
1. "Miles"
2. "Ornette"
3. "Pharoah"
4. "Herbie"
5. "Mingus"
6. "Ra"
7. "Dolphy"
8. "Ranelin"
9. "Deodato"
10. "Coltrane"

== #9: Channel 85 Presents Nittyville ==
Medicine Show #9: Channel 85 Presents Nittyville

Studio album by Madlib and MC Frank Nitt
- Released: May 17, 2011 (CD); May 31, 2011 (Vinyl)
- Genre: Hip-hop
- Length: 43:48
- Label: Madlib Invazion
- Producer: Madlib

Professional ratings
Review scores
Source	Rating
AllMusic	4/5 stars

"One MC, one producer, and a rap record all about stunts, blunts and hip-hop."

=== Track List ===
1. "Nittyville (The Landing)"
2. "So Beautiful (Dues Paid)"
3. "Stageridin'"
4. "Smoke Theme for Dankery Harv"
5. "Jus' Follow"
6. "The Exclusive (Bar Scene) feat. The Professionals"
7. "Eyegotcha"
8. "Legalize It (Interlude)"
9. "Sunday Sinema"
10. "What Can U Tell Me feat. MED"
11. "The Truth (Interlude)"
12. "Red Light Green"
13. "Go There"
14. "Set It Off feat. Prime"

Nittyville Extras (bonus disc)

Nittyville Extras

Studio album by Madlib
- Released: 2011 (Digital)
- Genre: Hip-hop
- Length: 26:44
- Label: Madlib Invazion
- Producer: Madlib

1. Madlib - "Nittyville Radio"
2. Madlib - "Go There (Remix)"
3. Madlib - "Nightrider (Instrumental)"
4. Madlib - "Party the Pain Away"
5. Madlib - "The Couch (ft. Que D)"
6. Madlib - "9th Street (Instrumental)"
7. Madlib - "Jus Follow (Remix)"
8. Madlib - "Who's Smoking (Interlude)"
9. Madlib - "So Beautiful (Remix)"
10. Madlib - "Dr Feel (Interlude)"
11. Madlib - "Stalker"
12. Madlib - "Monkey Hustle (Instrumental)"

== #10: Black Soul ==
Medicine Show #10: Black Soul

Studio album by Madlib
- Released: October 26, 2010
- Genres: Soul, disco, funk
- Length: 76:45
- Label: Madlib Invazion
- Producer: Madlib

"Madlib Medicine Show No. 10 reminds us of the mastery Madlib has performed throughout his heralded body of work, sourcing inspiration by the likes of Don Blackman, ZZ Hill or the Sylvers and blowing you away with the original work that stems from it. With Black Soul, he's digging deep to give you a mix of 60s and 70s soul, disco and funk unlike you've ever heard."

=== Track List ===
1. "To Promote Illogical Thinking"
2. "To Increase Efficiency of Mentation and Perception"
3. "To Promote the Intoxicating Effect of Alcohol"
4. "The Induction of Hypnosis"
5. "To Withstand Privation, Torture and Coercion"
6. "To Promote Amnesia"
7. "May Result in Shock and Confusion"
8. "To Produce “Pure” Euphoria"
9. "To Alter Personality Structure"
- All track names are references to the goals of an illegal CIA covert operation codenamed, "MKULTRA"

== #11: Low Budget High Fi Music ==
Medicine Show #11: Low Budget High Fi Music

Studio album by Madlib
- Released: January 18, 2011
- Genre: Hip-hop
- Length: 60:59
- Label: Madlib Invazion
- Producers: Madlib, Jaylib

Professional ratings
Review scores
Source	Rating
AllMusic	4/5 stars

"A 28-track hip-hop album of exclusive Madlib collabos w/ A.G., Guilty Simpson, MED, Oh No, Strong Arm Steady and others. Karriem Riggins pops in for a Supreme Team session, Madlib & Oh No debut The Professionals, and we hear a Jaylib-era track from their never-realized second album. Low Budget High Fi also contains several Loop Digga instrumentals and of course interludes, outerludes and probably quaaludes."

=== Track List ===
1. Madlib - "Sounds of the Studio (Prelude)"
2. The Professionals - "Hold Up"
3. Madlib - "Handmade Hustle (Instrumental)"
4. The Professionals feat. Roc C - "Start Sumthin' (93033)"
5. Guilty Simpson - "Thoughts of an Old Flame"
6. Madlib - "Minze (Come Closer)"
7. Madlib - "Louder (Blast Your Radio Theme)" (Produced by Jaylib)
8. Madlib - "The Ride (Nightcoastin' Instrumental)
9. A.G. - "O.G. (Whirlwind Mix)"
10. Oh No - "O.G. (Underwater Mix)"
11. Frank Nitty - "Stageridin' (First Demo Double Image Mix)"
12. Madlib - "Love/Hate (Instrumental)"
13. Strong Arm Steady - Loose Girl (Electronic Drunk Demon Version)"
14. Madlib - "Smoke Break (Whodat?)"
15. Supreme Team - "Interview #4080"
16. Madlib - "Embryo Thought (Instrumental)"
17. Madlib - "The Adventures of Soul Bra and Docta Dick’em (Pts. 1 and 2)"
18. MED - "Cheaters (Episode #3) feat. Poke"
19. Madlib - "Interliberation (Interlude)"
20. Madlib - "Mic Check (Smoke Break II)"
21. L.M.D. - "Real Talk"
22. Madlib - "The Sound of Champions (Instrumental)"
23. Strong Arm Steady - "Charlie Hustle"
24. Madlib - " Girls (Prelude)"
25. Madlib - "Same"
26. MED - "Snakes 101"
27. J Rocc - "Girls"
28. J Rocc - "Uh (Outro)"

Beat Konducta Around the World (bonus disc)

Beat Konducta Around the World

Studio album by Madlib
- Released: 2011 (Digital)
- Genre: Hip-hop
- Length: 18:58
- Label: Madlib Invazion
- Producer: Madlib

1. Madlib - "The Middle East"
2. Madlib - "L.A. California (U.S.)"
3. Madlib - "Jamaica"
4. Madlib - "Memphis (U.S.)"
5. Madlib - "Oakland, California (U.S.)"
6. Madlib - "New York (U.S.)"
7. Madlib - "Brazil"
8. Madlib - "Asia"
9. Madlib - "Philadelphia (U.S.)"
10. Madlib - "India"
11. Madlib - "The Lost Gates"
12. Madlib - "London"
13. Madlib - "Keebler Elf Forest"
14. Madlib - "Detroit (U.S.)"

== #12: Raw Medicine (Madlib Remixes) ==
Medicine Show #12: Raw Medicine (Madlib Remixes)

Mixtape by Madlib
- Released: September 27, 2011
- Recorded: 2011
- Genre: Hip-hop
- Length: 60:41
- Label: Madlib Invazion
- Producer: Madlib

"Rounding out the 12-part Madlib Medicine Show series, Madlib flips the format with Raw Medicine: Madlib Remixes - part mixtape, part beat tape, featuring a host of un-suspecting collaborators that run the gamut from thugs, street poets, star emcees and underdogs. We ain't naming names. The show runs 60 minute with 30+ tracks."

=== Track List ===
The following track list is unofficial and adopted from Rappcats.com

1. Intro
2. Capone-n-Noreaga
3. Inspectah Deck's verse from 7L & Esoteric's “Speaking Real Words” / Rae's verse from Big Pun's “Fire Water”
4. Q-Tip – For The Nasty
5. Interlude
6. Royce da 5'9" – Buzzin'
7. Interlude
8. Doom's verse from De La Soul's Roc Co Kane Flow
9. J Dilla – Let's Take It Back
10. Remixes 2 Intro
11. Lord Tariq & Peter Gunz – Cross Bronx Expressway
12. Musiq Soulchild – Caught Up / Ghostface – Love Session
13. Frank N Dank – Ma Dukes
14. O-Solo – Monsta
15. Interlude
16. Clipse – Pussy
17. Skillz– Y'all Don't Wanna
18. Interlude
19. Madlib – The Wigflip
20. AZ – Never Change
21. Interlude
22. Royal Flush – Shines
23. Ghostface – Save Me Dear
24. Interlude
25. Phil Da Agony – Watch Out
26. Guilty Simpson (OJ Simpson) – Outside
27. QB's Finest – Da Bridge 2001
28. Interlude
29. Cappadonna – Black Boy
30. Beanie Sigel – Wanted
31. Interlude
32. M.E.D.
33. Kardinal Offishal – Belly Dancer
34. The Un – D.O.A.
35. Sadat X – verse from Diamond D's “Feel It”
36. Interlude
37. Outro

== #13: Black Tape ==
Medicine Show #13: Black Tape

Studio album by Madlib
- Released: March 1, 2012
- Recorded: 2011–2012
- Genre: Hip-hop
- Label: Madlib Invazion
- Producer: Madlib

Professional ratings
Review scores
Source	Rating
AllMusic	3/5 stars

"The secret Medicine Show. Ages 18+."

=== Track List ===
1. Intro|1:02
2. Skillz - Do It Real Big|1:04
3. Jadakiss - Run|1:44
4. GZA/Genius - When the Fat Lady Sings|0:53
5. 50 Cent - What Up Gangsta / Tony Touch, Large Professor & Pete Rock - Out da Box|3:07
6. Busta Rhymes - Get You Some|1:20
7. U.N. - Nothin' Lesser|1:58
8. Blaq Poet - A Message from Poet|2:29
9. Strong Arm Steady - Pressure|2:21
10. Interlude 1|0:25
11. M.E.D. - ???|0:42
12. Redman - Jungle Boogie|2:02
13. DOOM - Melody|1:12
14. Pharoahe Monch - Fuck You|1:44
15. Elite Terrorist - Wanna Battle|2:18
16. Interlude 2|1:29
17. Masta Ace - Out da Box|1:01
18. Vakill - Keep the Fame|1:21
19. Interlude 3|0:57
20. Strong Arm Steady - Chittlins & Pepsi|2:03
21. Mali - Get Hype|2:43
22. Interlude 4|1:19
23. Montage - Larger Than Life|2:12
24. Common - The Sun God|2:40
25. Nas - Nas Is Like|2:29
26. Interlude 5|1:27
27. Organized Konfusion - Somehow, Someway|2:59
28. Frank Nitty - Jus' Follow|2:21
29. Interlude 6|1:24
30. Talib Kweli - Get By|2:17
31. Beat Junkies - Sick Days|2:16
32. Interlude 7|1:21
33. Eminem - Any Man / Capone-N-Noreaga - Closer|2:41
34. Interlude 8|2:10
35. Outro|2:45

== Madlib Medicine Show: The Brick ==
Medicine Show: The Brick

Compilation album by Madlib
- Released: April 27, 2012
- Recorded: 2009–2012
- Genre: Hip-hop
- Label: Madlib Invazion
- Producer: Madlib

"The complete Madlib Medicine Show series, #1-13."

"Originally announced in 2010: “Madlib is launching Madlib Medicine Show, a 12-part music series (12 CD's, 6 LP's) on his own imprint, Madlib Invazion. Odd numbers, beginning with #1 in Jan. 2010, will be original hip-hop, remix, beat tape and jazz productions; even numbers will be mixtapes of funk, soul, Brazilian, psych, jazz and other undefined forms of music from the Beat Konducta's 4-ton* stack of vinyl.”

Years before this series was announced Madlib had talked about an idea to release an album a month. For this producer, whose work thrives on a freestyle cut & paste, sometimes blurring the lines between original work and DJ mixing, there was little time or patience for the normal marketing and promotion norms of the music industry. By the start of 2010, it was time to experiment.

All told, the series became 13 releases, plus a few extra cuts of vinyl, and took nearly twice as long as expected. Along the way, some records got complicated, a few other projects took hold, some of the listeners lost track, while many others stayed for the whole trip."

== Madlib Medicine Show: Pill Jar ==
Medicine Show: Pill Jar

Compilation album by Madlib
- Released: February 13, 2013
- Recorded: 2009–2012
- Genre: Hip-hop
- Label: Madlib Invazion
- Producer: Madlib

Free EP. Compilation of tracks from Madlib Medicine Show 1–12.

=== Track List ===
1. Static Invazion (from MMS #5)
2. Episode XVI (from MMS #5)
3. The Paper (from MMS #1)
4. What Can U Tell Me (from MMS #9)
5. The Frontline (Liberation) (from MMS #3)
6. African Voodoo Queen (Drama) (from MMS #3)
7. Interview #4080 (from MMS #11)
8. Funky Butt, Part 1 (from MMS #7)
