= Miles Away (album) =

2010 studio album by the Last Electro-Acoustic Space Jazz & Percussion Ensemble

Studio album by The Last Electro-Acoustic Space Jazz & Percussion Ensemble
- Released: February 23, 2010
- Genre: Jazz fusion, electro-funk
- Length: 59:50
- Label: Stones Throw
- Producer: Madlib

Yesterdays New Quintet chronology
Yesterdays Universe (2007)	Miles Away (2010)	Slave Riot (2010)

Miles Away is a jazz and fusion music album by Oxnard-based hip hop producer Madlib's Jazz virtual band The Last Electro-Acoustic Space Jazz & Percussion Ensemble. It's a group of fictional members all created by Madlib. It was released early in 2010 on Stones Throw Records in vinyl and CD format.

== Reception ==
Professional ratings
Review scores
Source	Rating
Tiny Mix Tapes	3.5/5 marks
AllMusic	4/5 stars

== Track listing ==
All tracks composed, arranged, and produced by Madlib.

1. "Derf (For Derf Reklaw)" - 8:06
2. "One For The Monica Lingas Band" - 6:28
3. "Horace (For Horace Tapscott)" - 5:10
4. "Waltz For Woody (For Woody Shaw)" - 3:57
5. "Shades of Phil (For Phil Ranelin)" - 5:05
6. "Black Renaissance (For Harry Whitaker)" - 6:07
7. "Tones For Larry Young" - 5:15
8. "Mystic Voyage (For Roy Ayers)" - 4:26
9. "Two Stories For Dwight (For Dwight Tribble)" - 5:53
10. "The Trane & The Pharoah (For John Coltrane & Pharoah Sanders)" - 9:23

== Personnel ==
Credits adapted from liner notes.

- Otis Jackson Jr. – drums, percussion, arrangement
- Emil Taylor – electric bass, fretless bass
- Mary Lou Hudson – congas, tambourine
- Chuck King – fender rhodes, wurlitzer
- Teddy Davis – electric flute, percussion
- Willie Austin – guitar, harp
- Kamala Walker – organ, accordion
- Lady Faye – percussion
- Clyde Harrison – acoustic piano
- Ahmad Miller – sitar, vibraphone
- Tanya Harrison – moog synthesizer
- Madlib – production
- Peanut Butter Wolf – executive producer
- Radek Drutis – artwork
- Kelly Hibbert – mastering
