= A Tribute to Brother Weldon =

Studio album by Monk Hughes & The Outer Realm
- Released: July 27, 2004
- Genre: Acid jazz, jazz rap
- Length: 73:32
- Label: Stones Throw
- Producer: Madlib

Yesterdays New Quintet chronology
Stevie (2004)	A Tribute to Brother Weldon (2004)	The Funky Side of Life (2005)

Madlib chronology
Stevie (2004)	A Tribute to Brother Weldon (2004)	Theme for a Broken Soul (2004)

A Tribute to Brother Weldon is a tribute album to jazz musician Weldon Irvine by hip hop producer Madlib's Jazz project under the alias of Monk Hughes. The album features music by Weldon Irvine and was released in 2004 following his death in 2002. It was released on Stones Throw Records in CD format. The track "Time" was previewed by Madlib at Red Bull Music Academy 2002 in São Paulo, Brazil.

== Track list ==
All tracks produced, arranged and composed by Madlib.

1. "Prelude/Run With The Sun (Afterlife)" - 9:01
2. "A Piece For Brother Weldon" - 5:10
3. "Irvine's Vine (Spirit Man's Lament)" - 4:10
4. "Time" - 5:51
5. "Welldone" - 3:44
6. "Liberated" - 4:08
7. "Keys" - 6:02
8. "Still Young, Gifted & Broke" - 4:32
9. "Nodlew's Sea" - 4:43
10. "Day Of Spirit Man" - 5:12
11. "Master Wel's Tune" - 3:57
12. "The Beginning, The Middle & The End" - 17:02

== Credits ==
- Bass, Electric, Space Piano - Monk Hughes
- Drums, Loops, Kalimba - Otis Jackson Jr.
- Electric Piano (Fender Rhodes), Arp, Piano - Joe McDuphrey
- Organ, Moog, Percussion - Morgan Adams III
- Exec. Producer - Peanut Butter Wolf
