= Angles Without Edges =

Studio album by Yesterdays New Quintet
- Released: September 11, 2001
- Recorded: 2000–2001; The Dump (Los Angeles, CA); The Bomb Shelter (Los Angeles, CA)
- Genre: Nu jazz, jazz rap
- Length: 67:09
- Label: Stones Throw
- Producer: Madlib

Yesterdays New Quintet chronology
Angles Without Edges (2001)	Stevie (2004)

Madlib chronology
Madlib Remixes (2000)	Angles Without Edges (2001)	Beat Konducta Vol. 0: Earth Sounds (2001)

Professional ratings
Review scores
Source	Rating
AllMusic	4/5 stars
Exclaim!	(favorable)
Pitchfork	6.8/10

Angles Without Edges is the debut album by hip-hop producer Madlib's jazz project, Yesterdays New Quintet. Presented as a fictional quintet or virtual band, Yesterdays New Quintet consists of members Monk Hughes, Ahmad Miller, Joe McDurfey, Malik Flavors, and Otis Jackson Jr, all pseudonyms used by Madlib (with the exception of Otis Jackson Jr, which is the producer's legal name). The album was released in 2001 by Stones Throw Records on compact disc and vinyl record.

Though not entirely devoid of samples, Madlib used this album to experiment with live instrumentation, recording in his studio and arranging the recordings.

== Track listing ==
All tracks produced by Madlib.

No.	Title	Length
1.	"Prelude"	1:59
2.	"Julani"	3:05
3.	"Papa"	4:34
4.	"Keeper of My Soul"	4:18
5.	"The One Who Knows"	3:43
6.	"The Birth of YNQ"	2:53
7.	"Paladium"	5:35
8.	"Life's Angles"	3:07
9.	"Thinking of You"	3:15
10.	"Uno Esta"	3:44
11.	"Rugged Tranquility"	4:07
12.	"Daylight"	3:55
13.	"Hot Water"	3:44
14.	"Mestizo Eyes"	3:55
15.	"Sun Goddess"	3:57
16.	"Kuhn's Theme"	2:32
17.	"Little Girl (Dakota's Song)"	2:21
18.	"Broken Dreams"	5:34
19.	"Last Day"	0:55

== Personnel ==
Credits adapted from liner notes.* Yesterdays New Quintet – keyboards, synthesizers, vibraphone, electric bass, kalimba, drums, percussion, electric guitar, clavinet, samples, loops, omnichord, programming* Jeff Jank – design* Peanut Butter Wolf – executive producer* Dave Tompkins – liner notes* Gene Grimaldi – mastering* B+ – photography*

== Song appearances ==
From 2004 to 2010, several songs from Angles Without Edges appeared as background music in commercial bumpers on Adult Swim, including "Sun Goddess", "Daylight", "Paladium", "Life's Angles", "Little Girl (Dakota's Song)", "Keeper of My Soul", "Rugged Tranquility", "Papa", "The One Who Knows", "Uno Esta", "Julani", "Mestizo Eyes", "Hot Water", "The Birth of YNQ", and "Kuhn's Theme".
