= The EP (Frank n Dank album) =

Studio album by Frank N Dank
- Released: May 3, 2007
- Recorded: 2007
- Genre: Hip-Hop
- Label: Dopeness Galore Records
- Producer: I.N.T. Kid Sublime; Wouda; Elsas; Y'skid; Kid Sundance

Frank N Dank chronology
Xtended Play Version 3.13 (2006)	The EP (2007)	The F.D.R. Project (2007)

The EP is Frank N Dank's fourth album. The album's production is entirely handled by Dutch producers such as I.N.T., Kid Sublime, Wouda, Y’skid and Elsas. The only single of the album is "Clap Hands".

== Track listing ==
#	Title	Producer(s)
1	"One Time For The..."	I.N.T., co-mixed by Wouda
2	"Dilla Words (Skit)"	Y'skid
3	"Why?"	Y'skid
4	"The Spaceraider (Skit)"	Kid Sublime, co-mixed by Wouda
5	"Spitkicker"	Elsas
6	"Part II (Skit)"	Elsas
7	"F-N-D (Skit)"	I.N.T., co-mixed by Wouda
8	"Ruff, Rugged & Raw"	Wouda
9	"Clap Hands"	Kid Sublime, co-mixed by Wouda
10	"Hit It (Skit)"	Wouda
11	"Outro"	I.N.T., co-mixed by Wouda
12	"Ruff, Rugged & Raw (Kid Sundance Remix)" (bonus track)	Kid Sundance
13	"Spitkicker (Wouda's Werkmix)" (bonus track)	Wouda

== Singles ==
Single information
"Clap Hands"
- Released: March 26, 2007
- B-side:
