= Space & Time (album) =

Space + Time

Studio album by R.M.C.
- Released: 2010 (Japan only)
- Genre: Jazz
- Label: Orochon
- Producer: Madlib, Morgan Adams III

Yesterdays New Quintet chronology
| Slave Riot (2010) | Space + Time (2010) |

Space + Time is a jazz music album by hip hop producer Madlib's 'Yesterday's New Quintet' fictional character R.M.C..

== Track listing ==
All tracks composed, arranged, and produced by Madlib.

1. "High Stakes Place"
2. "Space & Time"
3. "60 N' Fig"
4. "XU"
5. "Lotto Master"
6. "Solaris II"
