= Slave Riot =

Studio album by Young Jazz Rebels
- Released: March 23, 2010
- Genre: Jazz fusion, electro-funk, soul
- Length: 53:07
- Label: Stones Throw
- Producer: Madlib

Yesterdays New Quintet chronology
Miles Away (2010)	Slave Riot (2010)	Space & Time (2010)

Professional ratings
Review scores
Source	Rating
Pitchfork	6.7/10

Slave Riot is a jazz and fusion music album by Oxnard-based hip hop producer Madlib's Jazz virtual band Young Jazz Rebels. It's a group of fictional members all created by Madlib. It was released on March 23, 2010, on Stones Throw Records in vinyl and CD format.

== Track list ==
1. "Ancestors" - 1:42
2. "The Legend Of Mankind" - 2:12
3. "The Wind" - 2:17
4. "Forces Unseen" - 2:22
5. "On The Run From Mr. Charlie" - 3:17
6. "The Sun" - 3:13
7. "Hate/Love" - 2:30
8. "Newear" - 2:41
9. "Theme From Illusion Suite" - 2:00
10. "Primal Sound (The Moon)" - 1:23
11. "Nappy Headed History" - 3:14
12. "Young Day (Short Version)" - 2:26
13. "For Brother Sun Ra" - 2:26
14. "Hope" - 0:41
15. "Nino's Deeds (Alternate Take)" - 2:52
16. "Slave Riots (Parts 1-3, Before)" - 6:38
17. "Slave Riots (Parts 4-6, After)" - 7:01
18. "Black Freedom" - 4:04

== Personnel ==
Credits adopted for Discogs.

- Project Coordinator - Eothen "Egon" Alapatt
- Design - Jeff Jank
- Executive Producer - Peanut Butter Wolf
- Featuring - Brother Dave L, Juggy Lewis, Lamont Parker, Lena Hamilton, Mary Jane (9), Melvin Hampson, Monk Hughes, Tyrone Crumb
- Mastered By - Kelly Hibbert
- Producer - Madlib
- Written-By - Melvin Hampson (tracks: 3, 14)
- Written-By - Monk Hughes (tracks: 1, 6, 12, 18)
- Written-By - Stanley Cowell (tracks: 9)
- Written-By - Young Jazz Rebels (tracks: 2, 4, 5, 7, 8, 10, 11, 13, 15, 16, 17)
