= Psychedelic rap =

Microgenre

- Other names: Psychedelic hip-hop; psych-rap; acid rap
- Stylistic origins: Hip-hop; psychedelic rock; psychedelic soul; funk; jazz
- Cultural origins: 1980s, New York

Other topics
- Trip hop; progressive rap; sampledelia; alternative hip hop; cloud rap; chopped and screwed; acid rock

Psychedelic rap (also known as psychedelic hip-hop) is a microgenre that fuses hip-hop with psychedelia. The genre's sound was influenced by psychedelic rock and soul, funk and jazz, utilizing breaks and samples that create a hallucinogenic effect. Psychedelic drugs may also play a part in shaping the genre's sound.

== Characteristics ==
Psychedelic rap is defined by "deep musicality, anchored by dusty drum breaks and samples often lifted from jazz records", resulting in music that is "both comforting and otherworldly — both retro and Afrofuturistic". Some psychedelic rap artists, such as Flatbush Zombies, are influenced by psychedelic drugs. The genre has its roots in the psychedelic rock of Jimi Hendrix, whose "hypnotic, laidback vocal style" on songs like "Crosstown Traffic" would "[foreshadow] the stoned swagger of a West Coast hip-hop MC", according to Tidal magazine. Psychedelic soul, such as Sly Stone, and funk, were also key influences on psychedelic rap. Parliament-Funkadelic are among hip-hop's most sampled artists. Betty Davis was cited as another precursor to psychedelic rap, as her recordings "wove singularly freaky funkiness with proto-rap aggression", particularly on "Shut Off the Light," in which Davis has been described as "barking, screeching and howling in a spoken-sung style over a barbed-wire slap-bass riff". Her ex-husband, jazz musician Miles Davis, "chased head-trip sounds through tape-splicing studio experimentation and electric chaos", which predated sampling.

== History ==
=== 1980s–1990s ===
In the late 1980s, new-school hip-hop, as exemplified by LL Cool J and Run-DMC, led to the "philosophical introspection and radical, brainy beat-making" of Beastie Boys' 1989 album Paul's Boutique, which was a landmark sampledelia album, sampling sources which ranged from Curtis Mayfield's psychedelic soul song "Superfly" to Pink Floyd's progressive rock song "One of These Days". Beastie Boys were inspired to create a "psychedelic rap manifesto" in "B-Boy Bouillabaisse" by listening to the Beatles' Sgt. Pepper's Lonely Hearts Club Band, the Beach Boys' Pet Sounds and Hendrix. New York's Native Tongues collective, headlined by De La Soul, Jungle Brothers and A Tribe Called Quest, pioneered psych-rap. Although De La Soul were categorized as a psychedelic rap outfit, the group denied either being a psychedelic group or hippies. Shock G of Digital Underground, who translated P-Funk's musical language to hip-hop, was another pioneer of psychedelic rap.

Cypress Hill and Redman, in addition to psychedelic hip-hop, can also be classified as "weed rap"; the latter's 1992 release Whut? Thee Album was categorized as a psychedelic rap album, and Black Moon's psychedelic hip-hop defined the sound of 1990s hip-hop, while Poland's Kaliber 44 were labeled "psycho-rap" for their psychedelic rap music. The psychedelic rap rock band Pop Will Eat Itself charted in 1988 and 1991, while psychedelic rap group P.M. Dawn were signed to Gee Street Records in the early 1990s, and the psychedelic rap band New Kingdom released two influential albums in the late '90s. In 1996, Kool Keith released the psychedelic hip-hop concept album Dr. Octagonecologyst, about "a deadly, libidinous and doped-up doctor". Some experimental hip-hop artists, like Quasimoto, are also considered to be psychedelic. Though the "trip" in trip hop was more linked to dub music than psychedelia, the genre combined psychedelic rock with hip-hop.

=== 2000s–2010s ===
The commercially successful Atlanta rap duo OutKast became prominent purveyors of psychedelic hip-hop, described by NME as having become "the best in the world" at the style by the time of their 2000 hit single "Ms. Jackson." The group were "inspired by the Afrocentric psychedelics" of George Clinton and Sly Stone, and particularly by the psychedelic funk of Clinton's Parliament-Funkadelic collective. Although psych-rap would be predominantly underground in the early 2000s, many mainstream artists would be influenced by psychedelia in their lyrics, production and artwork, such as on D12's 2001 single "Purple Pills", noted for Eminem's hallucinogenic production.

In 2005, Edan released the album Beauty and the Beat, which was featured on Vice's list of "4 Essential Psych Rap Albums For Any Newcomer to the Genre" in 2025. Vice described the album as a "homage to 60s acid funk as much as an innovation in psych rap and an exhibition of Edan’s quick witted lyrical skills".

Flatbush Zombies, formed in 2010, would "reinvigorate psychedelic rap as a concept", according to Clash Music. In 2013, Chance the Rapper released Acid Rap, an album that displayed "nonsensical and exuberant lyrics alongside poignant social commentary and personal confessions", and experimental production which drew from jazz, blues, soul and rock and roll; Clash Music described the album's unclassifiable sound as "its own genre of music". THEESatisfaction were labeled as both "psychedelic space-rap/jazz" and "hippie hop".

Kid Cudi would breakthrough with "noir-trippy storytelling and tracks of mind-expanding atmosphere", while Danny Brown and Odd Future's Earl Sweatshirt would emerge as "psych-tinged" MCs. In a profile on the genre by Tidal magazine, it was noted that many of the most important works in contemporary hip-hop would be psychedelic, such as Travis Scott's 2018 album, ASTROWORLD, which "peerlessly filters contemporary hip-hop production through magic-mushroom sonics". Scott's Days Before Rodeo "pushed psychedelic trap into the mainstream".

Artists like Thundercat and Flying Lotus revived interest in P-Funk and jazz-influenced hip-hop. In a review of Ski Mask the Slump God's 2018 release Beware the Book of Eli, the reviewer named E-40's The Element of Surprise, Quasimoto's The Unseen and Young Thug's Jeffery as examples of psychedelic rap.

=== 2020s ===
In 2023, rapper Lil Yachty shifted his sound from "bubblegum trap" to psychedelic rock with Let's Start Here, a "maximalist and multi-genre undertaking" which GQ deemed "a spectacular statement from hip-hop's prevailing weirdo" and the rapper's "first great album". Metro Boomin's 2022 album Heroes & Villians was classified by Pitchfork as psychedelic trap and a shift from his signature sound and comfort zone.
