= Theme for a Broken Soul =

Studio album by DJ Rels
- Released: August 24, 2004
- Recorded: 2004
- Genre: Electronic music, broken beat, house
- Length: 62:19
- Label: Stones Throw
- Producer: DJ Rels

Madlib chronology
A Tribute to Brother Weldon (2004)	Theme for a Broken Soul (2004)	The Further Adventures of Lord Quas (2005)

Theme for a Broken Soul is an electronic and house music album by hip hop producer Madlib under the alias of DJ Rels. It was released on August 24, 2004 through Stones Throw Records. The album was inspired by the West London scene responsible for the short lived "broken beat" scene. Theme for a Broken Soul is really reminiscent to the West London sound which was heavily ruled by likes of 2000BLACK, Dego, Kaidi Tatham to mention a few.

== Critical reception ==
Professional ratings
Review scores
Source	Rating
AllMusic	3.5/5 stars
HipHopSite	3/5 stars
Prefix Magazine	6.0/10
RapReviews	8/10

Upon its release, Theme for a Broken Soul received generally favorable reviews from music critics. Josh Bush of AllMusic says "Madlib is surprisingly faithful here, each track sounding like it could be inserted on a broken beat mix album with few problems. Little character, to be sure, but solid results." Nikhil P. Yerawadekar of HipHopSite gave the album a three out of five, saying "This DJ Rels album, while never particularly offensive, is monotonous (most of its songs being in one narrow tempo range) and overall uninteresting. Madlib could have done a lot better than this album." Matthew Gasteier of Prefix Magazine gave the album a 6.0 out of ten, saying "Madlib often succeeds as DJ Rels, and he should be applauded for even trying to go in such a different direction. But save the applause for when you're on the dance floor. Personally, I'm staying home and putting on Madvillainy." Dan Mennella of RapReviews gave the album an eight out of ten, saying "When you're as well accomplished as Madlib is, you've earned the right to try something a little different like this. Heck, he's already made a career out of it."

== Track listing ==
- All tracks produced by DJ Rels

No.	Title	Length
1.	"Don't U Know"	5:13
2.	"Sunrise"	5:47
3.	"Broken Soul/Dawn"	9:07
4.	"Universal Peace"	6:52
5.	"Sao Paulo"	4:42
6.	"Eclipse Pt. 1 & 2"	4:39
7.	"Song for My Lady"	4:26
8.	"Moonride"	5:53
9.	"Waves"	4:55
10.	"The Doo (Do It)"	4:03
11.	"Diggin in Brownswood"	5:28
12.	"?"	1:14
Total length:		62:19
