= Blunted in the Bomb Shelter =

Compilation album by Madlib
- Released: November 4, 2002
- Recorded: 2002
- Genre: Ska; reggae; dub
- Length: 63:28
- Label: Antidote (catalog # ANTCD102)
- Producer: Madlib

Madlib chronology
Beat Konducta Vol. 0: Earth Sounds (2001)	Blunted in the Bomb Shelter (2002)	Shades of Blue (2003)

Blunted in the Bomb Shelter is a compilation album by hip-hop producer Madlib. This album is a collection of reggae, ska, and dub songs taken from the catalogs of Trojan Records. Compiled around 2001 to 2002, the album was first released in the format of two 12-inch LPs and later released on CD format.

== Track listing ==
The track listing is referenced from the CD format.

#	Title	Length	Original Artist
1A	"A Place in The Sun"	0:46	David Isaacs
1B	"Fire Corner"	0:46	King Stitt
1C	"Black Man Time"	0:46	I-Roy
2	"Flat Foot Hustlin"	1:48	Dillinger
3	"Jungle Lion"	1:14	Lee Perry & The Upsetters
4	"Walk Rastafari Way"	1:16	Mikey Dread
5	"Destruction Sound Battle"	1:13	Prince Far I
6	"Public Jestering"	1:11	Judge Winchester
7	"A Better Version"	0:55	King Tubby
8	"Bad Da"	1:35	Gregory Isaacs
9	"Black Magic Woman"	1:18	Dennis Brown
10	"Throne of Blood"	1:37	Prince Jammy
11	"Lottery Spin"	1:52	Zap Pow
12	"Star Trek"	1:37	The Vulcans
13	"Want Me Cock"	0:26	Owen & Leon Silveras
14	"Free Man"	0:22	The Ethiopians
15	"Man in the Street"	0:26	Don Drummond
16	"Don't Deal With Folly"	2:08	Prince Far I
17	"I Love Marijuana"	2:05	Linval Thompson
18	"Stop The Dubbing"	1:07	The Aggrovators
19	"Free From Chains"	1:53	Prince Jazzbo
20	"Sensimelia"	1:45	Barrington Levy
21	"Mission Impossible"	1:53	Roots Radics
22	"Golden Chickens"	1:51	Ramon & The Crystalites
23	"Herb Vendor"	2:08	Leroy Wallace
24	"Babylon Deh Pon Fire"	1:05	Truth, Fact & Correct
25	"Shaft"	1:04	The Chosen Few
26	"Sipreano"	1:23	The Upsetters
27	"Girl of My Dreams"	1:01	Cornell Campbell
28	"Rhythm Pleasure"	0:56	Jerry Lee Lewis
29	"Cocaine"	2:26	Sly & The Revolutionaries
30	"Love Life"	1:52	U Brown
31	"(Only Rasta Know The) Voice Of Jah"	1:45	Mikey Dread
32	"Teacher, Teacher (Teach The Children)"	0:47	Dennis Alcapone
33	"DJ's Choice"	1:26	Dennis Alcapone
34	"King Tubby's Special"	1:30	King Tubby and U-Roy
35	"Reggae Makosa"	1:30	Brent Dowe
36	"A Rougher Version"	0:35	King Tubby
37	"Cool Down Version"	1:14	King Tubby
38	"Space Flight"	1:03	I-Roy and Lee "Scratch" Perry
39	"On The Move"	1:09	Roland Alphonso
40	"Guns of Navarone"	1:35	The Skatalites
41	"Popcorn"	1:31	The Upsetters
42	"None Shall Escape the Judgment"	2:13	Johnny Clarke
43	"Freedom Style"	2:12	Trinity
44	"Starvation"	0:40	The Pioneers
45	"African People"	2:05	The Jay Boys
