= Stevie (album) =

Studio album by Yesterdays New Quintet
- Released: April 20, 2004
- Recorded: 2001–2003
- Genre: Nu jazz, R&B, funk
- Length: 37:45
- Label: Stones Throw
- Producer: Madlib

Yesterdays New Quintet chronology
Angles Without Edges (2001)	Stevie (2004)	A Tribute to Brother Weldon (2004)

Madlib chronology
Madvillainy (2004)	Stevie (2004)	A Tribute to Brother Weldon (2004)

Professional ratings
Review scores
Source	Rating
AllMusic	3/5 stars
HipHopDX	7/10
Pitchfork	8.5/10

Stevie is the second album released by Madlib's virtual band, Yesterdays New Quintet. As suggested by the title, the album is a tribute album to the R&B musician, Stevie Wonder. It was released in 2004 on Stones Throw Records.

== Track listing ==
All tracks produced by Madlib. All tracks composed by Yesterdays New Quintet.

1. "Prelude" – 0:29
2. "Superstition" – 3:06
3. "Visions" – 3:44
4. "Superwoman/Where Were You Last Winter" – 5:10
5. "Rocket Love Pt. 1" – 3:07
6. "You've Got It Bad Girl" – 3:43
7. "Send One Your Love" – 2:51
8. "Too High" – 2:36
9. "I Am Singing" – 4:47
10. "Golden Lady" – 3:46
11. "That Girl" – 4:26

== Personnel ==
Credits adopted from Discogs.

- Bass guitar – Monk Hughes
- Drums – Otis Jackson Jr.
- Keyboards – Joe McDuphrey
- Percussion – Malik Flavors
- Vibraphone – Ahmad Miller
- Written by – Stevie Wonder
