= Yesterdays Universe =

Studio album by Yesterdays New Quintet
- Released: July 17, 2007
- Recorded: 2006–2007
- Genre: Jazz rap
- Length: 73:42
- Label: Stones Throw Records
- Producer: Madlib

Yesterdays New Quintet chronology
The Funky Side of Life (2005)	Yesterdays Universe (2007)	Miles Away (2010)

Madlib chronology
Liberation (2007)	Yesterdays Universe (2007)	Beat Konducta Vol 3-4: Beat Konducta in India (2007)

Yesterdays Universe is an album by Yesterdays New Quintet, released on Stones Throw Records in 2007. The album, produced entirely by Madlib, marks the end of the group Yesterdays New Quintet as Madlib's jazz project and the beginning of Yesterdays Universe.

== Background ==
Most of these names and groups are, in fact, Madlib aliases, Madlib solo projects, or groups Madlib has with other artists such as Karriem Riggins and Ivan "Mamao" Conti of Azymuth.

The universe refers to Madlib's virtual band of animated jazz musicians, all of whom were created by Madlib. The groups include The Last Electro-Acoustic Space Jazz Ensemble, Kamala Walker and The Soul Tribe, Monk Hughes & The Outer Realm, The Eddie Prince Fusion Band, Joe McDuphrey Experience, The Jahari Massamba Unit, Yesterdays New Quintet, Young Jazz Rebels, Sound Directions, Jackson Conti, The Jazzistics, Malik Flavors, Ahmad Miller and Suntouch. Many of the tracks on the album are taken from previous Yesterdays Universe releases, most of which were released by Stones Throw exclusively on vinyl.

The song "Two for Strata-East" is a tribute to the jazz label Strata-East Records, founded in 1971 by Stanley Cowell and Charles Tolliver.

== Track listing ==
#	Title	Composer(s)	Performer(s)	Producer(s)	Time
1	"Bitches Brew (M. Davis)"	Miles Davis	Otis Jackson Jr. Trio	Madlib	
2	"Umoja (Unity)"	O. Jackson Jr. K. Riggins; I. Conti	The Jahari Massamba Unit; Karriem Riggins Trio	Madlib	
3	"Slave Riot (D. Smith)"	O. Jackson Jr. K. Riggins; I. Conti	Young Jazz Rebels	Madlib	
4	"One for the Monica Lingas Band"	O. Jackson Jr. K. Riggins; I. Conti	The Last Electro-Acoustic Space Jazz & Percussion Ensemble	Madlib	
5	"Street Talkin'"	O. Jackson Jr. K. Riggins; I. Conti	Kamala Walker & The Soul Tribe	Madlib	
6	"Marcus, Martin, & Malcolm"	O. Jackson Jr. K. Riggins; I. Conti	The Jazzistics	Madlib	
7	"Two for Strata East"	O. Jackson Jr. K. Riggins; I. Conti	Suntouch	Madlib	
8	"She's Gonna Stay"	O. Jackson Jr. K. Riggins; I. Conti	Sound Directions	Madlib	
9	"Cold Nights and Rainy Days"	O. Jackson Jr. K. Riggins; I. Conti	The Last Electro-Acoustic Spaze Jazz & Percussion Ensemble	Madlib	
10	"Free Son"	O. Jackson Jr. K. Riggins; I. Conti	Otis Jackson Jr. Trio	Madlib	
11	"Barumba (L.Eca, Bebeto)"	Luiz Eça & Bebeto	Jackson Conti	Madlib	
12	"Sunny C (California)"	O. Jackson Jr. A. Miller; K. Riggins; I. Conti	Ahmad Miller	Madlib	
13	"Mtume's Song"	O. Jackson Jr. K. Riggins; I. Conti	The Eddie Prince Fusion Band	Madlib	
14	"Vibes from the Tribes Suite (For Phil)" (Phil Ranelin)	Phil Ranelin	Yesterday's Universe All Stars	Madlib	
15	"Upa Neguinho" (Edu Lobo / Gianfrancesco Guarnieri)	Edu Lobo / Gianfrancesco Guarnieri	Jackson Conti	Madlib	
