= Shades of Blue: Madlib Invades Blue Note =

Shades of Blue

Remix album by Madlib
- Released: June 24, 2003
- Studio: The Bomb Shelter, LA
- Genre: Jazz rap; instrumental hip-hop; underground hip-hop; experimental hip-hop
- Length: 56:51
- Label: Blue Note
- Producer: Madlib

Madlib chronology
Blunted in the Bomb Shelter (2002)	Shades of Blue (2003)	Champion Sound (2003)

Shades of Blue: Madlib Invades Blue Note is a remix album by American hip-hop producer Madlib over the archives of Blue Note Records. It was officially released by Blue Note Records on June 24, 2003.

== Reception ==
Professional ratings
Review scores
Source	Rating
AllMusic	4/5 stars
The A.V. Club	favorable
Exclaim!	favorable
Pitchfork	8.6/10
Stylus Magazine	C+

Sam Samuelson of AllMusic said, "Intent listening doesn't really give much up, but for smooth subconscious grooves, it's perfect."

In 2014, Paste placed it at number 11 on their "12 Classic Hip-Hop Albums That Deserve More Attention" list.

== Track listing ==
No.	Title	Length
1.	"Introduction"	0:32
2.	"Slim's Return" (feat. Ahmad Miller and DJ Lord Such)	3:56
3.	"Distant Land"	3:58
4.	"Mystic Bounce"	3:56
5.	"Stormy" (feat. Morgan Adams Quartet Plus Two)	3:41
6.	"Blue Note Interlude"	0:42
7.	"Please Set Me at Ease" (feat. M.E.D.)	5:02
8.	"Funky Blue Note" (feat. Morgan Adams Quartet Plus Two)	3:07
9.	"Alfred Lion Interlude"	0:45
10.	"Stepping into Tomorrow"	7:36
11.	"Andrew Hill Break"	1:06
12.	"Montara" (feat. DJ Lord Such)	5:51
13.	"Song for My Father" (feat. Sound Directions)	5:46
14.	"Footprints" (feat. Yesterdays New Quintet)	4:58
15.	"Peace/Dolphin Dance" (feat. Joe McDuphrey Experience)	5:38
16.	"Outro"	0:17

== Charts ==
Chart (2003)	Peak position
US Top Jazz Albums (Billboard)	13
US Top Contemporary Jazz Albums (Billboard)	8
