= Frank n Dank =

American hip hop group

Frank N Dank
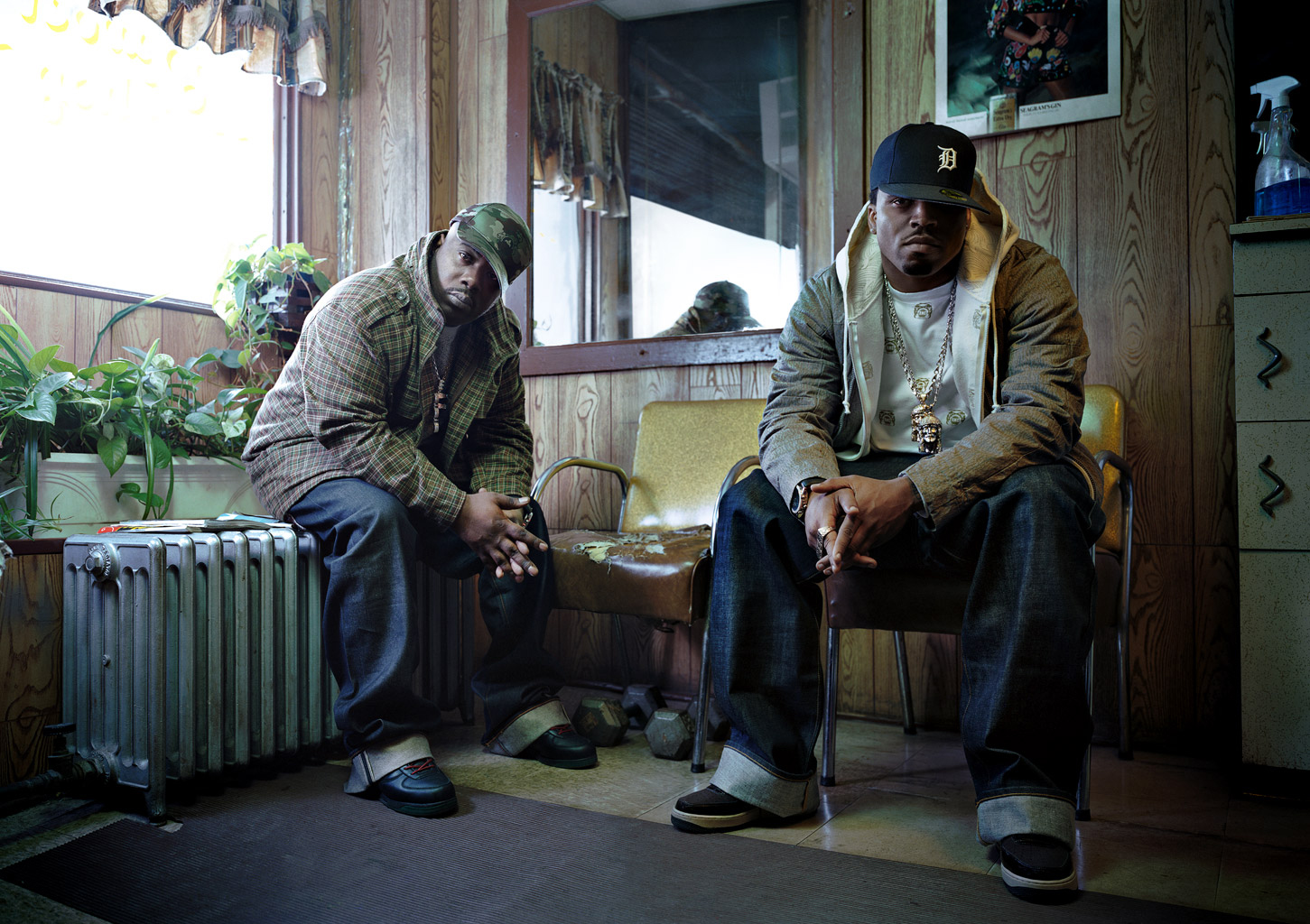
- Frank N Dank in 2007

Background information
- Origin: Detroit, Michigan, United States
- Genre: Hip hop
- Years active: 1999–present
- Labels: McNasty; MCA; Loose Zipper; Needillworks?; Chisel Sound; Dopeness Galore
- Members: Frank Nitt; Dankery Harv
- Website: www.myspace.com/frankndank

Frank N Dank (real names Frank Bush and Derrick Harvey) are an American hip hop group from Detroit, Michigan. They also go by the names Frank Nitt (previously known as Frank Nitty, which is a reference to the 1930s crime boss Frank Nitti) and Dankery Harv, and are best known for their many collaborations with the late J Dilla, as well as their party-driven, tongue-in-cheek raps.

== Career ==
The duo first came to public attention as guests on producer J Dilla's album, Welcome 2 Detroit in 2001. Prior to this, they had been performing in their hometown, Detroit, since the mid-1990s and had released the 12"s "Everybody Get Up!" and "Me and My Man" between "Love (A Thing of the Past)", both produced by J Dilla.

The group signed a recording deal with MCA Records, but their 2003 album, 48 Hours, was at first rejected by the label, reworked with new production and resubmitted by the group, and finally shelved by the label altogether. Bootlegs of the reworked version eventually surfaced on the underground. The album was entirely produced by J Dilla, who uses very few samples throughout the album, instead choosing to concoct synth-driven beats for the MCs to rhyme over. It is believed that the original version of 48 Hours was more sample based, and that this may have been a factor in it being rejected by MCA, due to sample clearances.

Frank n Dank released their follow-up albums, Xtended Play in 2004, and Xtended Play Version 3.13 in 2006. The album Xtended Play Version 3.13 contained production by J Dilla (who died before its release), and other producers. The song "MCA" details their uphill climb in the music industry.

Frank n Dank and J Dilla's European Vacation DVD included the last performances from J Dilla and Frank n Dank. Frank n Dank’s European Vacation was released on July 24, 2007.

== Discography ==
=== Studio ===
- 48 Hours
  - Released: August 5, 2003
  - Label: Loose Zipper
- Xtended Play LP
  - Released: 2004
  - Label: Needillworks?
- Xtended Play Version 3.13
  - Released: October 27, 2006
  - Label: Needillworks?/Chisel Sound
- The EP
  - Released: May 3, 2007
  - Label: Dopeness Galore

=== Mixtapes ===
- The Chronicles of Frank n Dank
  - Released: 2005
  - Label: Needillworks?

=== Singles ===
- 2000: "Everybody Get Up!" / "Give It Up II"
- 2000: "Me and My Man" (feat. Phat Kat) / "Love (A Thing of the Past)"
- 2000: "Eve (J Dilla Remix)" (Spacek feat. Frank n Dank)
- 2001: "Pause" (J Dilla feat. Frank n Dank)
- 2002: "Push" / "Where the Parties at?" / "I'll Bet You Will" (Extended Play)
- 2002: "Okay" / "Push" (White Label 12")
- 2002: "Take Dem Clothes Off" (feat. J Dilla) / "Off Ya Chest" (feat. J Dilla)
- 2003: "Ma Dukes" (feat. Tammy Luccas) / "Pimp Strut"
- 2003: "McNasty Filth" (Jaylib feat. Frank n Dank)
- 2004: "Nice 2 Meet U" (feat. Brick & Lace)
- 2004: "I Need That"
- 2004: "Sexy" (feat. DJ Dopey)
- 2006: "What Up" (prod. Lancecape)
- 2006: "The Hustle"
- 2006: "Nice 2 Meet U ('06 Version)" (feat. Brick & Lace)
- 2006: "MCA" (feat. Reign)
- 2006: "Smokesum" (Red Baron feat. Frank n Dank)
- 2007: "Clap Hands" (feat. Kid Sublime)
- 2007: "Puff Puff Pass"
- 2011: "Freaks"

=== Other albums ===
- The F.D.R. Project (with Young RJ)
  - Released: July 24, 2007
  - Label: Needillworks?
- The Concert Hall EP (by Frank Nitt)
  - Released: April 29, 2008
  - Label: Digipop
- D 2 H (by Dankery Harv)
  - Released: February 2, 2010
  - Label: Interscope Digital Distribution
- Jewels In My Backpack (by Frank Nitt)
  - Released: May 25, 2010
  - Label: Delicious Vinyl
- Madlib Medicine Show #9: Channel 85 Presents Nittyville (by Madlib and Frank Nitt)
  - Released: May 17, 2011
  - Label: Madlib Invazion
- The Smoke Musik EP (by Frank Nitt and DJ Rhettmatic)
  - Released: May 10, 2013
  - Label: Free album
- Sunset Blvd. (by Illa J and Frank Nitt as Yancey Boys)
  - Released: October 29, 2013
  - Label: Delicious Vinyl
- Organic. (by Dankery Harv )
  - Released: May 22, 2020
  - Label: OnTheRunRecords
- A NEW DAY (by Dankery Harv )
  - Released: July 4, 2020
  - Label: OnTheRunRecords
- 100% PURE (by Dankery Harv and NOCASINO )
  - Released: August 20, 2020
