= The Funky Side of Life =

Studio album by Sound Directions
- Released: October 7, 2005
- Genres: Jazz, funk
- Length: 33:00
- Label: Stones Throw
- Producer: Madlib

Yesterdays New Quintet chronology
A Tribute to Brother Weldon (2004)	The Funky Side of Life (2005)	Yesterdays Universe (2007)

The Funky Side of Life ratings
Review scores
Source	Rating
AllMusic	7/10 stars
Tiny Mix Tapes	5/5 stars

The Funky Side of Life is a jazz album released by Madlib's jazz project under the alias of Sound Directions. It features Madlib playing different instruments under different aliases as part of a single group, along with session musicians. This album was released in late 2005 under Stones Throw Records.

== Track listing ==
All tracks produced by Madlib.

1. "Directions" - 1:07
2. "Dice Game" - 3:48
3. "Wanda Vidal"(Marcos Valle) - 2:17
4. "Forty Days" (Billy Brooks) - 5:08
5. "Play Car" - 3:19
6. "Divine Image" (David Axelrod) - 2:19
7. "The Funk Side of Life" - 2:59
8. "Theme for Ivory Black" - 3:33
9. "The Horse" (Frank Brunson) - 2:49
10. "One for J.J. (Johnson)" (J.J. Johnson) - 2:23
11. "On the Hill" (Oliver Sain) - 3:18

== Personnel ==
Credits adapted from liner notes.

=== Sound Directions ===
- Morgan Adams III – vocals, keyboards, organ
- Otis Jackson Jr. – drums, kalimba, keyboards, sound effects, voices
- Derek Brooks – electric bass, synthesizer
- Joe Johnson – drums, percussion

=== Additional musicians ===
- Dan Ubick – guitar (tracks 4, 6, 7 and 11)
- Tracy Wannomae – alto saxophone, flute and bass clarinet (tracks 1, 6, 7, 9, 10 and 11)
- Kevin Lightning – baritone and tenor saxophone and flute (tracks 1, 2, 4, 6, 7 and 9)
- David Ralicke – tenor saxophone and trombone (tracks 1, 2, 4, 6, 7, 9, 10 and 11)
- Hoagie Haven – trumpet and flugelhorn (tracks 2, 4, 7, 9, 10 and 11)
- Todd Simon – trumpet, flugelhorn, keyboards and flute (tracks: 1, 2, 4, 6, 9, 10 and 11)
- Don Babatunde – drums (tracks 8 and 9)
- Malcom Catto – drums (track 7)
- D'Wayne Kelly – Hammond B-3 and harp string ensemble (track 6)

=== Additional personnel ===
- Madlib – production, arrangements, mixing
- Peanut Butter Wolf – executive producer
- Todd Simon – horn arrangement
- Kamala Walker – additional arrangements
- Connie Price – horn arrangement (track 11)
