= Si Phili =

British rapper

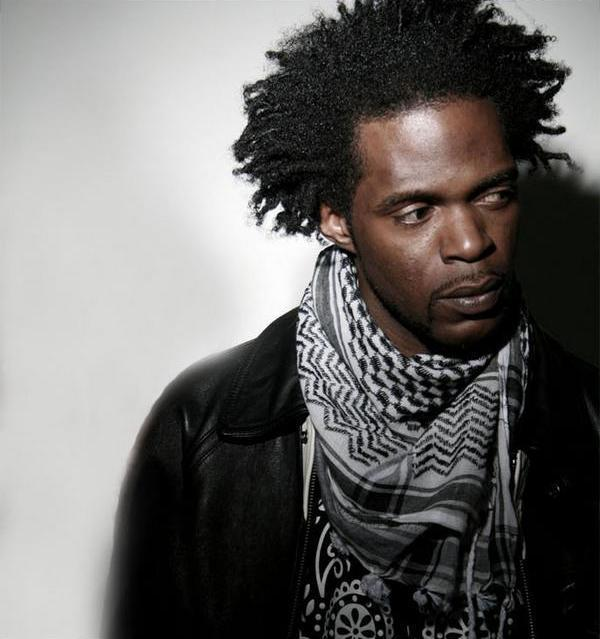
- Si Phili in 2008

Background information
- Born: Simon Philbert; 22 October 1974 (age 52)
- Origin: Luton, England
- Genre: Hip hop
- Years active: 1996–present
- Formerly of: Phi Life Cypher
- Website: siphili.com

Simon Philbert (born 22 October 1974), known professionally as Si Phili, is a British rapper. He was a member of the former UK hip hop group Phi Life Cypher, which split in 2012.

Since the split of PLC, Si Phili has launched a solo career and got together with battle rapper Dotz to form "Phili N Dotz". The duo released the album Phil N the Dotz in May 2014. They have toured across the UK and Europe.

== Biography ==
Phi Life Cypher was a hip hop trio composed of two MCs, Si Phili and Life MC, and DJ Nappa, who are all from Luton. The trio started making music together around 1996, and have since had much success on the UK underground circuit. Phi-Life Cypher made it to the final of Tim Westwood's Talent 2000 competition and ripping the mic on DJ Skitz's seminal posse cut 'Fingerprints of the Gods' projected them to the upper realms of the UK hip hop scene.

Si Phili, along with Phi Life Cypher, released "Clint Eastwood", the track on the Gorillaz' G-Sides, a compilation of the B-sides from the first three singles was released in Japan and quickly followed with international releases in early 2002. The new year also saw a complicated performance at the 2002 Brit Awards, featuring the band in 3D animation, weaving in and out of each other on four large screens along with rap accompaniment by Phi Life Cypher.

== Discography ==
=== Albums ===
- Millennium Metaphors (2000, Jazz Fudge)
- The Instrumentals (2000, Jazz Fudge)
- Higher Forces (2003)
- Playback (2006)

=== Singles and EPs ===
- "Baddest Man" (1998, white label)
- "Earth Rulers" (2000, Jazz Fudge)
- "Herbaholics" (2001, Jazz Fudge)
- The Chosen Few EP (with Task Force) (2002, Jazz Fudge)
- "Over" (2003, Zebra Traffic)
- "Rap It Up" (2004, Zebra Traffic)
- "Playback" (2006)

=== Guest appearances ===
- Gorillaz — "Clint Eastwood" (Phi Life Cypher version), "The Sounder" (edit)
- The Herbaliser — "Distinguished Jamaican English" (The Herbaliser remix)
- Skitz — "Fingerprints of the Gods", "Cordless Mics at 20 Paces"
- Mark B. & Blade — "Ya Don't See the Signs" (Phi Life Cypher remix)
- DJ Vadim — "Ghetto Rebels"
