= Yungun =

British hip hop artist

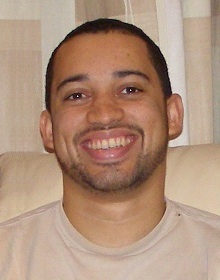

Yungun (a.k.a. Essa) is a British hip hop artist. He released his debut album The Essance on Janomi Records in 2004. He was born in North London, where he currently works and resides.

== Biography ==
He was educated at Eton College.

He began his musical career as a host and MC on pirate radio station Parlay in Harrow during the mid-1990s. There he formed the group Dupa Styles with fellow MCs M.E. Moon and Devise.

In 1998 Yungun made contact with Harry Love who began to play the role of Dupa Styles's DJ and Producer. Whilst still recording with the group, Yungun began a solo career, appearing on projects by LG & Lopez (City Breaks), Evil Ed (The Art of Celebration) Doc Brown (Out There) and Tommy Evans (Four Horsemen, Silent Mobius).

Yungun has worked with many different UK artists including Jehst and Lewis Parker.

Yungun tours both nationally and internationally, and regularly receives airplay from such DJs as Radio One's Steve Lamacq, Zane Lowe, Gilles Peterson Bethan and Huw, Vic Galloway and has performed a live studio set on Ras Kwame's show. Aside from this, Yungun has also presented a feature-length show for BBC Radio 1Xtra as well as being interviewed and featured on shows from presenters such as DJ Blakey, DJ Semtex, Rodney P and Skitz, DJ Kayper, Benji B and Bobby Friction. He has also been interviewed by Craig Charles on BBC 6 Music, and is regularly played on the station's 6mix show, as well as by numerous other Radio 6 DJs such as Tom Robinson, Phill Jupitus, Chris Hawkins Gary Burton, Liz Kershaw and Andrew Collins, and has had live concerts broadcast on GCap Media's XFM Station.

In 2005 Yungun performed with a full live band for the BBC Africa Season at BBC's Maida Vale Studios. The show was broadcast in a special feature show on 1Xtra.

He has been featured numerous publications including regular spots in Hip-Hop Connection. He has also performed on international festival tours, such as Love Planet and Hip-Hop Kemp, he also appeared at the 2006 Bestival Festival with The Nextmen. He also hosted the MTV Europe Music Awards and MTV's Cannes Film Festival party.

In 2006 he released a new album, Grown Man Business, with Mr Thing, to critical acclaim.

== Discography ==
=== Albums ===
- The Essance (2004, Janomi)
- Grown Man Business (Yungun and Mr Thing) (2006, Silent Soundz)

=== Singles ===
- "Bachelors Anthem" (2003, white label)
- "Dancing Shoes" (Mr. Thing and Yungun) (2003, Janomi)
- "Push" (2004, Janomi)
- "The Big Idea" (Lewis Parker and Yungun) (2004, Canteen)
- "Forget Me Not" (Yungun and Mr. Thing) (2006, Silent Soundz)
- "Jackin 4 Breaks" (Yungun and Mr. Thing) (2006, white label)

=== Compilation appearances ===
- £10 Bag Volume 2 (2003, Music from the Corner) ("Yungun")
- Low Life's Main Courses—'Food' (2003, Low Life) ("What Eye See")
- Low Life's Main Courses—'Food' Instrumentals (2003, Low Life) ("What Eye See" (instrumental))
- Young and Restless Volume 1 (2003, YNR) ("4 Horsemen", "City Breaks")
- Doc Brown presents…Citizen Smith Vol. 1 [Triple P/Poisonous Productions, 2004]
- A Slice of Paradise Volume 1 (2004, Fusionova) ("It Don't Matter")
- We Got Next (2004, HHC Magazine) ("The Big Idea")
- £10 Bag Volume 3 (2004, Music from the Corner) ("Push", "Outrageous")
- Bangers & Mash (2004, white label) ("City Breaks")
- Skitz—Homegrown Volume 1 (2004, React) ("Slumber")
- Undercover Cuts 13 (2004, Undercover Magazine) ("Push")
- Fabric Live 20 (2005, Fabric) ("Nico Suave")
- Evil Ed and K-Delight Live from Caesar's Palace (2005, Playing Around) ("Nico Suave")
- Skitz—Homegrown Volume 2 (2005, Silent Soundz) ("The Code")
- The Sickness (mixtape) (2005, Silent Soundz) ("Nico's Back")
- Fabric Live 26 (2006, Fabric) ("Alphabet Man", "Surprise")
- Above Board (mixtape) (2006, Antidote) ("Cross My Heart")
- Beats 'n' Rhymes (2007, Pistache) ("Peter Pan Syndrome", "Never Coming Down")

=== Guest appearances ===
- Tommy Evans – "4 Horsemen" (2001, YNR)
- LG & Lopez – "Life Long" (2001, Sit Tight)
- Delegates of Culture – "Pulse Reclusive" (2002, Delegates of Culture)
- Tommy Evans – "Silent Mobius" (2002, YNR)
- Doc Brown – "Out There" (2002, Janomi)
- LG & Lopez – "City Breaks" (2002, Sit Tight)
- Evil Ed – "The Art of Celebration" (2002, Hidden Identity)
- Jehst – "Adventures in New Bohemia" (remix) (2003, Low Life)
- Harry Love – "Surprize", "Live in London" (2004, Medication)
- Evil Ed – "Nico Suave", "The Cavalry" (2004, Janomi)
- Asaviour – "Money in the Bank" (remix) (2004, YNR)
- Beyond There – "Slumber" (2004, 72)
- Blufoot – "Alphabet Man" (radio mix) (2005, Scenario)
- Doc Brown – "Freestyle" (2005, Poisonous Poets)
- Ghost – "Vices/Verses" (radio mix) (2005, Breakin' Bread)
- Son of Scientist – "Slide" (2005, Main Squeeze)
- Doc Brown – "Never Coming Down" (2005, Janomi)
- Verb T and Harry Love – "Behind Your Eyes" (2006, Medication/Silent Soundz)
- Stylophonic – "Beatbox Show" (2006, Universal)
- Doc Brown – "The One" (2006, Hiptones)
- Asaviour – "Money in the Bank") (2006, Low Life)
- First Man – "That Girl", "Back for More" (2007, Grindin)
- Katalyst – "All You've Got" (2007, Invada)
