= Herbal Tonic (album) =

Compilation album by The Herbaliser
- Released: 14 June 2010
- Genre: Hip hop
- Length: 73:04
- Label: Ninja Tune

The Herbaliser chronology
Same as It Never Was (2008)	Herbal Tonic (2010)	There Were Seven (2012)

Herbal Tonic is a 2010 compilation album by British rap duo the Herbaliser. It was released by the Ninja Tune label on 14 June 2010. It consists of songs from the group's previously released albums on Ninja Tune, which were released between 1995 and 2010.

== Critical reception ==
Professional ratings
Review scores
Source	Rating
AllMusic	3.5/5 stars
The List	3/5
PopMatters	8/10
RapReviews	7/10
The Skinny	4/5 stars

Most critics gave Herbal Tonic favorable reviews; for example, Andy Fyfe of BBC Music described it as "as good a soundtrack to the last decade and a half as anyone can muster."

== Track listing ==
1. Gadget Funk
2. Nah' Mean Nah'm Sayin' (Featuring Jean Grae)
3. The Missing Suitcase
4. The Blend (Featuring Jean Grae)
5. Starlight (Featuring Roots Manuva)
6. Song For Mary
7. Mr Chombee Has The Flaw (From Session 2)
8. Something Wicked
9. Mrs Chombee Takes The Plunge (Remixed by DJ Food)
10. The Sensual Woman
11. It Ain't Nuttin' (Featuring MF Doom)
12. 8pt Agenda
13. Tea & Beer (Featuring Jean Grae)
14. Ginger Jumps The Fence (From Session 1)
15. March Of The Dead Things (Unreleased)
16. Stranded On Earth

== Personnel ==
- The Herbaliser

=== Featured artists ===
- Jessica Darling
- Jean Grae
- Latyrx
- MF Doom
- Roots Manuva
- Seaming To

=== Production and arrangements ===
- Chris Bowden – string arrangements
- Easy Access Orchestra – horn arrangements, horn engineer, producer
- Ollie Teeba – producer
- Jake Wherry – producer
