= Session One =

Live album by The Herbaliser
- Released: 26 May 2000
- Genre: Jazz, funk, hip hop
- Length: 42:14
- Label: Department H DEPTHLP001 (Vinyl); DEPTHCD001 (CD)
- Producer: Ollie Teeba/Jake Wherry

The Herbaliser chronology
Very Mercenary (1999)	Session One (2000)	Something Wicked this Way Comes (2002)

Session One is an album released by The Herbaliser on 26 May 2000. While the band had been together since the mid-1990s, contributing to and promoting Herbaliser's largely electronically produced albums, this was the first studio album recorded with a live band released under the group name The Herbaliser Band.

Each track is a live representation of a track from the first three Herbaliser albums, Remedies, Blow Your Headphones and Very Mercenary. Most tracks are completely instrumental, and vocals are only present in sample form on two tracks ("Who's the Realest?" and "The Sensual Woman").

The music mixes jazz, funk and hip hop with a classic big band sound.

== Track listing ==
1. "Who's the Realest?"
2. "Ginger Jumps The Fence"
3. "Shocka Zulu"
4. "Shattered Soul"
5. "The Sensual Woman"
6. "The Missing Suitcase"
7. "Goldrush"
8. "Forty Winks"

== Credits ==
The Herbaliser Band draws on the talents of a number of instrumentalists:

- Jake Wherry – Bass guitar
- Ollie Teeba – Turntables
- Mickey Moody – Drums
- Kaidi Tatham – Keyboards (ARP Pro Soloist, Hohner Clavinet D6, Korg Trinity, Fender Rhodes 73)
- Ralph Lamb – Trumpet, flugelhorn, additional keyboards
- Patrick Dawes – Percussion
- Andy Ross – Piccolo, flute, baritone and tenor saxophone
- Chris Bowden – Alto saxophone
- Matt Coleman – Trombone

== See also ==
- Remedies, by The Herbaliser
- Stampede, by The Quantic Soul Orchestra
- Man with a Movie Camera, by The Cinematic Orchestra
