= Something Wicked This Way Comes (The Herbaliser album) =

Studio album by The Herbaliser
- Released: 19 March 2002
- Studio: Train Trax Studios
- Genre: Nu jazz, hip hop
- Length: 54:18
- Label: Ninja Tune
- Producer: Jake Wherry, Ollie Teeba

The Herbaliser chronology
Session One (2000)	Something Wicked This Way Comes (2002)	Herbal Blend (2003)

Singles from Something Wicked This Way Comes
- 1. "Good Girl Gone Bad" Released: 2002; 2. "Something Wicked / Mr. Holmes" Released: 2002; 3. "Time 2 Build / Distinguished Jamaican English" Released: 2002

Professional ratings
Aggregate scores
Source	Rating
Metacritic	81/100
Review scores
Source	Rating
AllMusic	4/5 stars
Pitchfork	7.0/10

Something Wicked This Way Comes is the fourth studio album by English jazz hip hop group The Herbaliser. It was released via Ninja Tune on 19 March 2002. It peaked at number 71 on the UK Albums Chart.

== Critical reception ==
At Metacritic, which assigns a weighted average score out of 100 to reviews from mainstream critics, the album received an average score of 81% based on 10 reviews, indicating "universal acclaim".

Nic Kincaid of AllMusic gave the album 4 stars out of 5, calling it "a timely achievement in music, a genre-bending statement of creative poignancy." Brad Haywood of Pitchfork gave the album a 7.0 out of 10, saying, "The beats are just fine, but they lack the risk or innovation that could potentially make them truly engaging."

== Track listing ==
No.	Title	Length
1.	"Something Wicked" (featuring Seaming To)	5:10
2.	"Verbal Anime" (featuring Rakaa Iriscience)	3:46
3.	"Time 2 Build" (featuring Blade)	3:24
4.	"24 Carat Blag"	4:08
5.	"Mr. Holmes"	7:18
6.	"Good Girl Gone Bad" (featuring Wildflower)	4:07
7.	"The Hard Stuff"	2:01
8.	"Distinguished Jamaican English" (featuring Phi Life Cypher)	3:32
9.	"Worldwide Connected"	5:06
10.	"The Turnaround"	3:15
11.	"Battle of Bongo Hill"	4:52
12.	"It Ain't Nuttin'" (featuring MF Doom)	2:46
13.	"Unsungsong"	4:53

== Charts ==
Chart	Peak position
French Albums (SNEP)	113
UK Albums (OCC)	71
