= Herbal Blend =

Solid Steel Presents: Herbal Blend

Compilation album by The Herbaliser
- Released: 22 September 2003
- Genre: Hip hop, jazz
- Label: Ninja Tune; ZENCD083

The Herbaliser chronology
Something Wicked this Way Comes (2002)	Solid Steel Presents: Herbal Blend (2003)	Take London (2005)

Solid Steel chronology
Hexstatic: Listen & Learn (2002)	The Herbaliser: Herbal Blend (2003)	Amon Tobin: Recorded Live (2004)

Professional ratings
Review scores
Source	Rating
Allmusic	4.5/5 stars

Herbal Blend is a DJ mix album, mixed by The Herbaliser, released on 22 September 2003 as part of the Solid Steel mix series.

== Track listing ==
1. "Herbal Blend Intro"
2. "Laying The Trap" - Charles Bernstein / Verbal Anime (Acapella featuring Rakaa-Iriscience) - The Herbaliser
3. "The Broken Clock" - Cherrystones / Riddim Killa - Rodney P
4. "Exotica" - Harmonic 33
5. "Las Chicas" (The Herbaliser Remix) - The Easy Access Orchestra / Analyze (Acapella featuring Mr. Len) - Mass Influence
6. "Gangster Boogie" - Chicago Gangsters
7. "Uzi" (Pinky Ring) (Instrumental) - Wu-Tang Clan / It Ain't Nothin' (Acapella featuring MF Doom) - The Herbaliser
8. "Fuck The Police" (Instrumental) - Jay Dee / Sucker M.C.'s (Instrumental) - Run DMC
9. "The Number Song" (Cut Chemist Party mix) - DJ Shadow
10. "Tea & Beer" (Freestyle) (featuring Jean Grae) - The Herbaliser
11. "Pushin' On" - The Quantic Soul Orchestra
12. "Slick Cat" - Carol Kaye
13. "It's Up To You" - Steinski & Mass Media
14. "Time To Build" (P Brothers remix) - The Herbaliser
15. "Juice Crew Law" - MC Shan
16. "Mella" (The Herbaliser Drive Faster mix) - DJ Food
17. "Stars And Rockets" - Peter Thomas Sound Orchestra
18. "The Chase" - James William Guercio
19. "Groove Is In The Heart" (Jelly Jam Beats) - Deee-Lite
20. "Snake Bite" (The Herbaliser remix) - Fourth World
21. "Tilt" - Arcade Funk
22. "World Destruction" (featuring John Lydon) - Time Zone / The Missing Suitcase - The Herbaliser
