= DJ Yoda =

British turntablist (b. 1977)

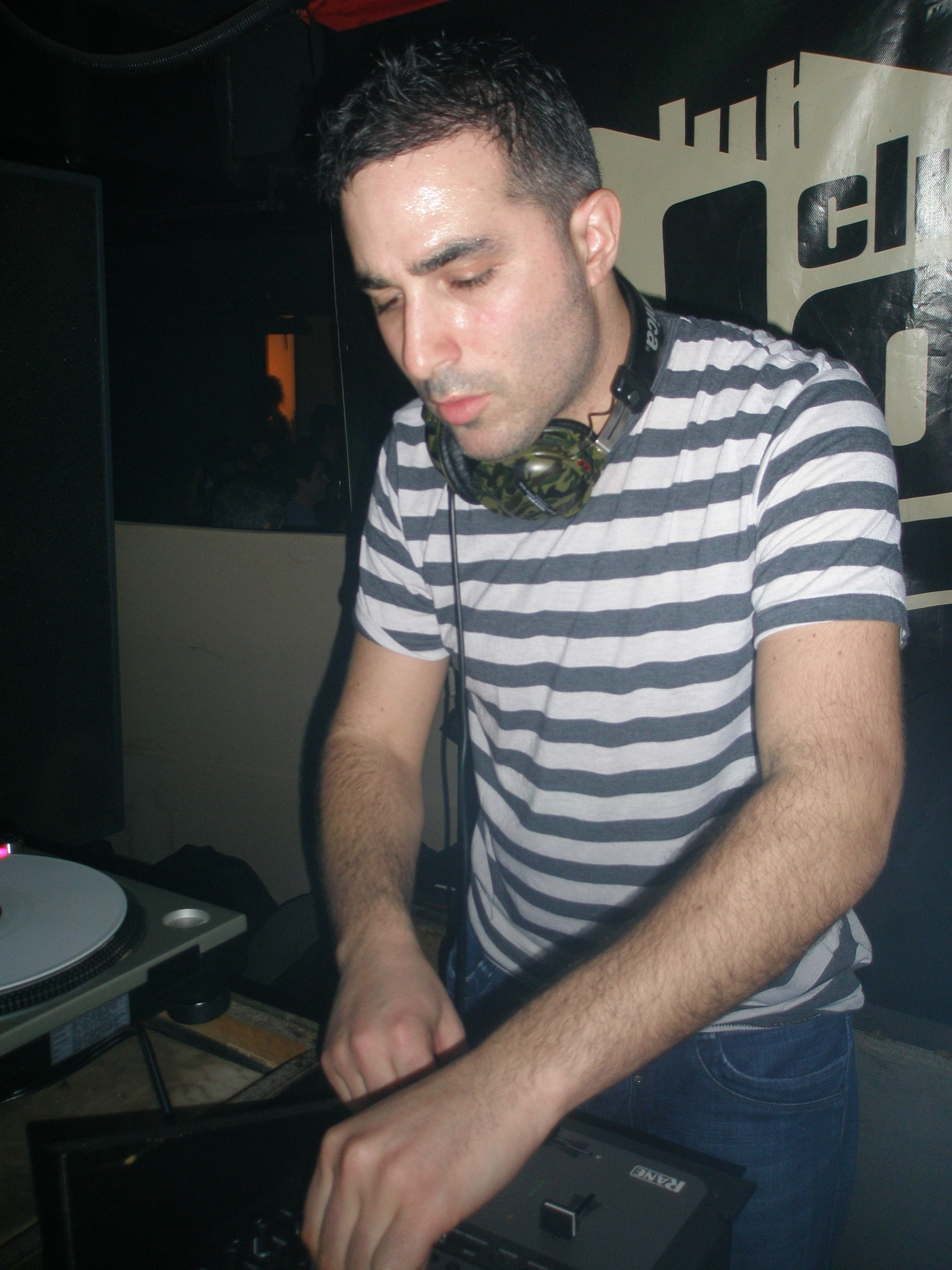
- DJ Yoda performing at Low Club in Madrid, Spain on February 17, 2008

Background information
- Born: Duncan Beiny; 28 November 1977 (age 48)
- Origin: London, England
- Genres: Hip hop; electronic; trip hop
- Occupation: DJ
- Years active: 1998–present
- Label: Antidote
- Website: djyoda.co.uk

Duncan Beiny (born 1977 in London, England), better known as DJ Yoda, is a hip hop DJ who uses samples to create an animated musical style. He is known for several awards and media industry achievements.

== Early life and career ==
After attending Highgate School, he studied English and American literature at the University of Warwick from 1995 to 1998. During this period, he began performing at Mojo, a popular Warwick hip hop and soul night at the student's union until he graduated. After he left university, he began releasing underground demo mix-tapes to small music shops. Through the popularity of these tapes, Antidote Records asked him to create an official mixtape, from which How to Cut & Paste Mix Tape Vol.1 was released.

He has won a DMC DJ of the Year award in the Scratch DJ category (2001) and was one of six nominees for best UK hip-hop DJ in the UK Hip-Hop Awards. He has also been nominated by Q magazine as one of the "Ten DJs To See Before You Die", has released a series of mix-tapes, and has toured the globe with Goldie and the Scratch Perverts.

Yoda released his debut album of original material, entitled The Amazing Adventures of DJ Yoda, on 2 October 2006 on Antidote Records. The album features guest vocalists, including Biz Markie, Sway, Ugly Duckling and MC Paul Barman. In addition to releasing his own material, he has also performed scratches on Danger Mouse and Jemini's Ghetto Pop Life.

He has been a regular guest on BBC Radio 1 appearing alongside Steve Lamacq and Annie Mac. In 2009, he was nominated for a Sony Radio Academy Award. In 2010, he also won the 9th Annual Independent Music Awards for Contemporary Classic Album with the Heritage Orchestra. He has been the hip-hop correspondent for IDJ magazines, and also wrote the DJ page for the now defunct Hip Hop Connection magazine, and has been part of the judging panel for the DMC DJ World Finals.

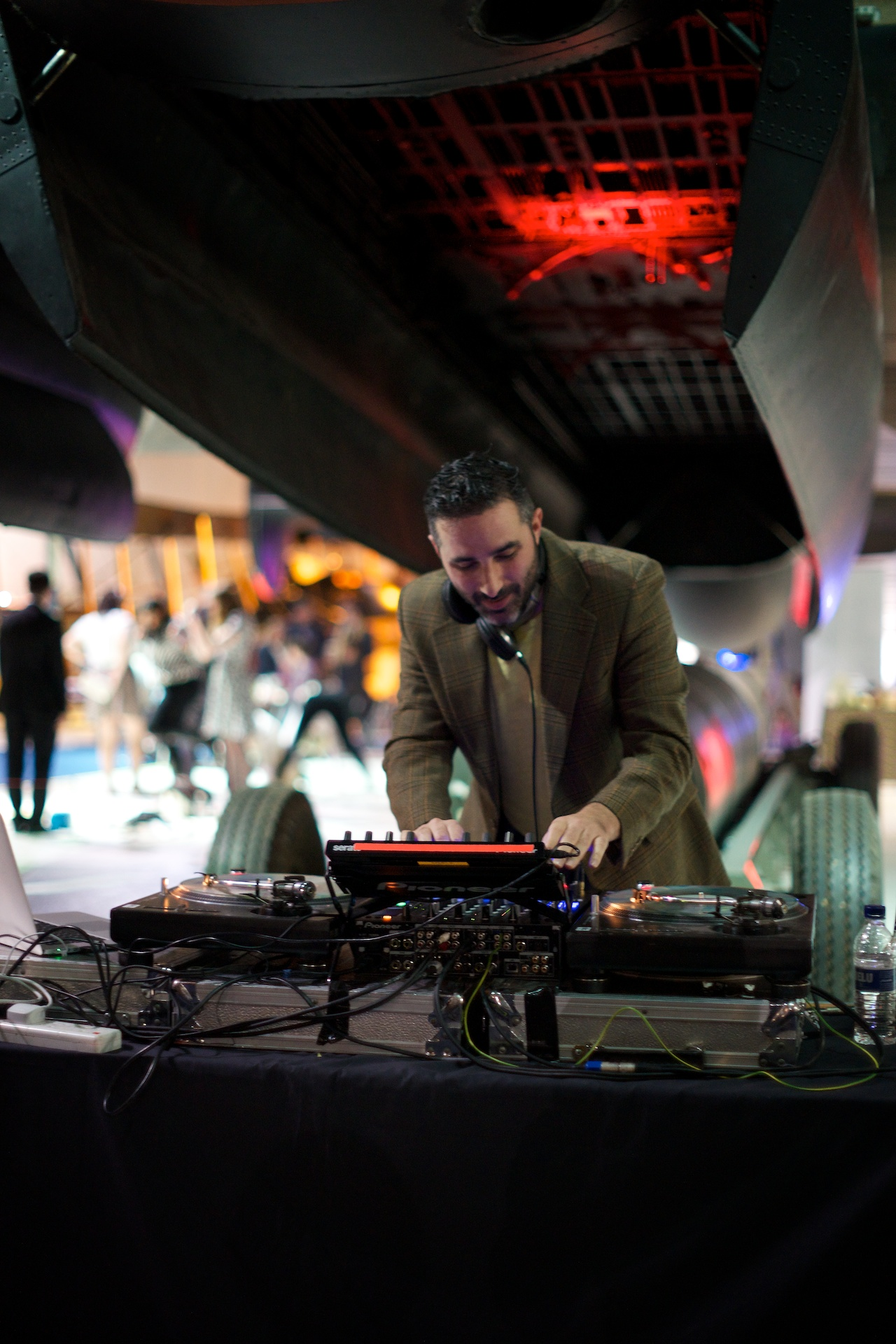
DJ Yoda performing in 2014

In 2014 he was commissioned to create DJ Yoda Goes to the Sci-Fi Movies as part of the BFI's Sonic Cinema event. He presented the first audio-visual radio mix on BBC Radio 6 Music. As part of their BBC Music Day, Radio 4 invited Yoda to mash-up the entire station, remixing The Archers, the Shipping Forecast, and John Humphrys.

In 2015 he was Dr. Dre's first choice to record a guest mix on his inaugural Beats 1 show for Apple Music, and performed at Banksy's pop-up Bemusement Park, Dismaland.

In 2016 his "Stranger Things Mix" racked up more than a quarter of a million plays on SoundCloud, culminating in his UK tour of Stranger Things: The Mixtape Live. That same year, his A History of Gaming premiered at the London Film Festival, charting nostalgic video games from the early 1980s onwards.

In 2019 he released Home Cooking featuring Nubya Garcia, Eva Lazarus, Edo.G, Theon Cross, Henry Wu and Joel Culpepper. The album was released on Lewis Recordings.

== Discography ==
=== Albums ===
- The Amazing Adventures of DJ Yoda (Antidote Records) (2006)
- Chop Suey (Get Involved Records) (2012)
- DJ Yoda Presents Breakfast of Champions (Get Involved Records) (2015)
- Home Cooking (Lewis Recordings) (2019)
- Prom Nite (Lewis Recordings) (2022)

=== EPs ===
- Wheels (Antidote Records) (2006)
- DJ Yoda & Friends (2011)

=== Singles ===
- DJ Yoda featuring People Under the Stairs – "Quid Control" (2002)
- "Wheels" (Antidote Records) (2006)
- "Playin' Around" (Antidote Records) (2007)
- "Charlie Sheen" (Get Involved) (2012)
- DJ Yoda featuring Man Like Me – "Idiot" (Get Involved) (2012)
- DJ Yoda featuring A Boy Called George – "Happy" (Get Involved) (2012)
- "And to the World / Click (Radio Edit)" (Get Involved) (2015)
- "Pebble Beach / 2468" (Get Involved) (2015)
- DJ Yoda featuring Scroobius Pip – "Sega RIP" (Get Involved)
- "Open Your Eye" (feat. Rex Domino & Shlomo) (Get Involved) (2015)
- "The Baddest" (Get Involved) (2015)

=== Mix CDs ===
- How to Cut and Paste Mix Tape Vol.1 (Antidote Records) (2001)
- Fisticuts (Spine Magazine) (2001)
- How to Cut and Paste Mix Tape Vol.2 (Antidote Records) (2002)
- How to Cut & Paste: The 80's Edition (Antidote Records) (2003)
- Dan Greenpeace & DJ Yoda – Unthugged (Antidote Records) (2003)
- Dan Greenpeace & DJ Yoda – Boxfresh (Boxfresh Records) (2004)
- Dan Greenpeace & DJ Yoda – Unthugged 2 (Antidote Record)
- Hey! Wha' Happened?! (2006)
- FabricLive.39 (fabric Records) (April 2008)
- Dan Greenpeace & DJ Yoda – Jews Paid (2008)
- Dan Greenpeace & DJ Yoda – Jews Paid Too (2008)
- How to Cut & Paste: Country & Western Edition (Antidote Records) (2009)
- How to Cut & Paste: The Thirties Edition (2009)
- How to Cut & Paste: The Asian Edition (2013)
- How to Cut & Paste: The Halloween Edition (2014)
- DJ Yoda presents Breakfast of Champions (2015)
- DJ Yoda presents Breakfast of Champions (Rotty Chimes Remixes) (2016)
- The Stranger Things Mixtape (2016)
- Make Mixtapes Great Again (2019)
- How to Cut and Paste Collection (2019)

=== Vinyl ===
- Piano Breaks (1998)
- Home Cooking (2019)

=== Cassette ===
- Jewbonics (1998)
- Dan Greenpeace & DJ Yoda – Jews Paid (1999)
- Dan Greenpeace & DJ Yoda – Jews Paid Too (1999)

=== Compositions ===
- Quid Control [12" vinyl] (Antidote Records) (2002)
- The Amazing Adventures Of (Antidote Records) (2006)

=== Video game appearances ===
- DJ Hero

=== DVDs ===
- DJ Yoda Goes to the Movies (promotional DVD, 2006)
- DJ Yoda Goes to the Movies 2 (2007)
