= Everyday Life =

Everyday life is the routine habits people perform.

Everyday Life may also refer to:

- Everyday Life (Coldplay album), 2019
  - "Everyday Life" (song), from the album of the same name
- Everyday Life (Life album), 2003
- Every Day Life, a rapcore band
- Nichijou (Japanese: 日常, Hepburn: Nichijō, lit. "Everyday Life") a 2006 Japanese manga series
