= This Week (album) =

Studio album by Jean Grae
- Released: September 21, 2004
- Studio: The Cutting Room Studios (New York, NY); The Bar Upstairs; The Brooklyn Academy; Dojo; The BK Firehouse; The Fyre Dept.
- Genre: Underground hip-hop
- Length: 1:01:21
- Label: Babygrande
- Producer: Chuck Wilson (exec.); Ruddy Rock (exec.); 9th Wonder; Belief; J. Cardim; LT Moe; Midi Mafia; Shan Boogs; Sid Roams; Will Tell; Adam Deitch

Jean Grae chronology
The Bootleg of the Bootleg EP (2003)	This Week (2004)	Jeanius (2008)

This Week is the second studio album by American rapper Jean Grae. It was released on September 21, 2004, via Babygrande Records. Recording sessions took place at The Cutting Room Studios in New York, at The Bar Upstairs, at The Brooklyn Academy, at Dojo, at The BK Firehouse and at The Fyre Dept. Production was handled by 9th Wonder, Belief, J. Cardim, LT Moe, Midi Mafia, Shan Boogs, Sid Roams, Will Tell and Adam Deitch, with Chuck Wilson and Ruddy Rock serving as executive producers. It features guest appearances from Block McCloud, Destruction, Ruddy Rock, Sinclair, The Genies and Tracey Moore.

== Critical reception ==
Professional ratings
Aggregate scores
Source	Rating
Metacritic	79/100
Review scores
Source	Rating
AllMusic	3.5/5 stars
Cokemachineglow	76/100%
HipHopDX	4/5
Now	4/5 Ns
Pitchfork	7.9/10
RapReviews	8/10
Spin	B+
The Village Voice	B+
Tom Hull	B+

This Week was met with generally favourable reviews from music critics. At Metacritic, which assigns a normalized rating out of 100 to reviews from mainstream publications, the album received an average score of 79, based on thirteen reviews.

Julianne Shepherd of Spin noted the rapper's vocal abilities, saying: "she finally showcases a flow as strong as her vitriol". Robert Christgau of The Village Voice wrote: "Grae can rhyme, and if she had a male larynx and a production budget, her hype men, chipmunk soul, minor-key piano hooks, and "I wanna rock a fella so bad" might stand underground on its head". Nin Chan of RapReviews wrote: "while I don't feel this to be anywhere near the seminal work that I feel she is utterly capable of, this is still essential listening from a highly relevant emcee". Jamin Warren of Pitchfork resumed: "while no track dips below the quality line, the album lacks thematic fluidity and spark". Peter Hepburn of Cokemachineglow concluded: "in the end, This Week suffers largely from the hype---there's no way this album could be as good as it was supposed to be". AllMusic's Andy Kellman stated: "Jean Grae continues to improve in every respect, but the negative aspect is that too many of the beats bleed into one another".

== Track listing ==
No.	Title	Writer(s)	Producer(s)	Length
1.	"Intro" (featuring Ruddy Rock and Tracey Moore)	Tsidi Ibrahim; Jonas Cardim	J. Cardim	2:32
2.	"A-Alikes"	Ibrahim; Joey Chavez; Tavish Graham	Sid Roams	3:46
3.	"Cuervo Loco" (Skit)		Will Tell	1:38
4.	"Going Crazy"	Ibrahim; Chavez	Joey Chavez	4:45
5.	"Skit"			4:05
6.	"Style Wars" (featuring Block McCloud)	Ibrahim; Ismael Diaz, Jr.; William Davis	Will Tell	3:59
7.	"Not Like Me"	Ibrahim; Jesse Shatkin	Belief	4:59
8.	"Supa Luv"	Ibrahim; Patrick Douthit	9th Wonder	4:12
9.	"Give It Up" (featuring Block McCloud)	Ibrahim; Shan Nicholson	Shan Boogs	2:23
10.	"Whatever" (featuring The Genies)	Ibrahim; Shatkin	Belief	4:57
11.	"The Wall"	Ibrahim; Todd Moore	LT Moe	1:24
12.	"Before the Spot (Skit)" (featuring Destruction)		Will Tell	4:43
13.	"You Don't Want It"	Ibrahim; Kevin Risto; Waynne Nugent	Midi Mafia	4:27
14.	"Watch Me"	Ibrahim; Chavez; Graham	Sid Roams	5:19
15.	"P.S."	Ibrahim; Cardim	J. Cardim	3:40
16.	"Don't Rush Me"		9th Wonder	4:32
17.	"Fyre Blazer"	Ibrahim; Adam Deitch	Adam Deitch
Total length:				1:01:21

== Charts ==
Chart (2004)	Peak position
US Independent Albums (Billboard)	47
US Top R&B/Hip-Hop Albums (Billboard)	83
