= Very Mercenary =

Studio album by The Herbaliser
- Released: 20 April 1999
- Genre: Jazz, hip hop
- Length: 68:34
- Label: Ninja Tune
- Producer: Jake Wherry, Ollie Teeba, Malachi

The Herbaliser chronology
Blow Your Headphones (1997)	Very Mercenary (1999)	Session One (2000)

Singles from Very Mercenary
- 1. "Wall Crawling Giant Insect Breaks" Released: 1998; 2. "Road of Many Signs / Moon Sequence" Released: 1999; 3. "The Missing Suitcase" Released: 1999

Professional ratings
Review scores
Source	Rating
AllMusic	4/5 stars
Pitchfork	4.2/10

Very Mercenary is the third studio album by The Herbaliser. It was released on Ninja Tune in 1999. It peaked at number 19 on the UK Independent Albums Chart.

== Critical reception ==
Keith Farley of AllMusic gave the album 4 stars out of 5, saying, "the Herbaliser's third album works in '60s spy-funk territory to a degree unseen in the group's discography."

== Track listing ==
No.	Title	Length
1.	"Intro"	1:01
2.	"Mission Improbable" (featuring What What)	3:09
3.	"Who's the Realest?"	(Note: uses samples of: the 1986 film Running Scared Gary DeVore and Jimmy Huston (writers) Jimmy Smits and Joe Pantoliano (speaking) Gang Starr (1992) Fat Joe (1998)) 4:44
4.	"When I Shine" (featuring Bahamadia)	3:54
5.	"Goldrush"	6:09
6.	"Moon Sequence"	6:20
7.	"Mind in the Frame" (featuring Blade)	5:11
8.	"Funny?"	0:52
9.	"Shattered Soul"	5:15
10.	"Road of Many Signs" (featuring The Dream Warriors)	4:53
11.	"Wall Crawling Giant Insect Breaks"	5:39
12.	"The Sensual Woman"	5:00
13.	"Let It Go" (featuring What What (Note: uses samples of songs by artists: Beastie Boys (1985) Skalpel (2000)))	5:26
14.	"Jake's Backache"	0:21
15.	"The Missing Suitcase"	5:33
16.	"Starlight" (featuring Roots Manuva)	5:07

Japanese edition bonus track
No.	Title	Length
17.	"Road of Many Signs (DJ Yas Remix)"	4:28

== Charts ==
Chart	Peak position
UK Independent Albums (OCC)	19
