= Life MC =

British rapper

Life MC, or simply Life, is a British rapper who gained prominence as a member of the Luton-based British hip hop group Phi Life Cypher with fellow rappers Si Phili and DJ Nappa. Life has released five solo albums to date as well as various mixtapes with DJ Nappa. He is known for freestyling. He has filmed several music videos in and around Luton.

== Discography ==
=== Albums ===
- Everyday Life (2003)
- Realities Of Life (2006)
- Outside Looking In (2008)
- Life Beyond Rap (2010)
- Gift of Life (2013)
- Sounds of the Underground (2014)

=== Mixtapes ===
- The Ultimate Flow Championship (2005)
- The Ultimate Flow Championship (2012)
- Da Throwback (2012)

=== With Phi Life Cypher ===
- Millennium Metaphors (2000, Jazz Fudge)
- The Instrumentals (2000, Jazz Fudge)
- Higher Forces (2003)
- Playback (2006)

=== With Task Force ===
- The Chosen Few EP (2002)
