= Everyday Life (Life MC album) =

Studio album by Life
- Released: 24 March 2003
- Genre: Hip hop
- Label: Zebra Traffic
- Producer: DJ Nappa

Everyday Life is the first solo album by rapper Life MC of the British hip hop group Phi Life Cypher. The album was produced by fellow Phi Life Cypher member DJ Nappa, and was released on 24 March 2003.

"In Memory" is dedicated to the memory of Stephen Lawrence.

"Time Crisis" uses a sample from "Montagues and Capulets" from the 1935 ballet Romeo and Juliet.

== Track listing ==
No.	Title	Length
1.	"Alpha"	1:13
2.	"Rock It Right"	4:01
3.	"Never Be a Crackhead"	3:47
4.	"Kung Fu"	3:52
5.	"Babylonians"	2:56
6.	"Always Living"	3:10
7.	"Tomorrow"	3:52
8.	"Moviedrome"	6:32
9.	"Pound for Pound"	4:57
10.	"In Memory"	4:53
11.	"Number One"	4:15
12.	"Slave's Revenge"	5:01
13.	"Trust"	4:23
14.	"Baddest Man"	4:36
15.	"Chosen One"	3:58
16.	"Time Crisis"	4:19
17.	"Omega"	0:44
