= Same as It Never Was (album) =

Studio album by The Herbaliser
- Released: 27 May 2008
- Genre: Jazz, soul, hip hop
- Length: 51:47
- Label: Studio !K7
- Producer: Jake Wherry, Ollie Teeba

The Herbaliser chronology
| FabricLive.26 (2006) | Same as It Never Was (2008) | There Were Seven (2012) |

Singles from Same as It Never Was
- 1. "Amores Bongo / Bongo Boom" Released: 2007; 2. "Can't Help This Feeling" Released: 2008

Professional ratings
Review scores
| Source | Rating |
|---|---|
| AllMusic | 3/5 stars |
| Pitchfork | 6.5/10 |

Same as It Never Was is the sixth studio album by The Herbaliser. It was released on Studio !K7 in 2008.

== Critical reception ==
John Bush of AllMusic gave the album 3 stars out of 5, saying: "There's no doubting the Herbaliser's ability to deliver exactly what they're attempting, but despite the excellent playing and good vocal features (when they occur), the songwriting and choice of material make this record inferior to the usual Herbaliser standard."

== Track listing ==
| No. | Title | Length |
|---|---|---|
| 1. | "Same as It Never Was" | 3:39 |
| 2. | "On Your Knees" (featuring Jessica Darling) | 4:12 |
| 3. | "Just Won't Stop" (featuring Yungun a.k.a. Essa) | 3:24 |
| 4. | "The Next Spot" | 5:33 |
| 5. | "Can't Help This Feeling" (featuring Jessica Darling) | 3:22 |
| 6. | "Amores Bongo" | 4:10 |
| 7. | "Street Karma (A Cautionary Tale)" (featuring Jean Grae) | 3:39 |
| 8. | "You're Not All That" (featuring Jessica Darling) | 4:35 |
| 9. | "Blackwater Drive" | 4:57 |
| 10. | "Game Set and Match" (featuring More or Les) | 4:14 |
| 11. | "Clap Your Hands" (featuring Jessica Darling) | 3:18 |
| 12. | "Stranded on Earth" (featuring Jessica Darling) | 6:44 |

== Charts ==
| Chart | Peak position |
|---|---|
| French Albums (SNEP) | 77 |
