= Blow Your Headphones =

Studio album by The Herbaliser
- Released: 11 March 1997
- Studio: Train Trax Studios
- Genre: Hip hop, trip hop
- Length: 71:52
- Label: Ninja Tune
- Producer: Jake Wherry, Ollie Teeba, Jonny Cuba, Kaidi Tatham, Malachi

The Herbaliser chronology
Remedies (1995)	Blow Your Headphones (1997)	Very Mercenary (1999)

Singles from Blow Your Headphones
- 1. "New + Improved / Theme from Control Centre" Released: 1997; 2. "The Blend" Released: 1997

Professional ratings
Review scores
Source	Rating
AllMusic	4/5 stars
Christgau's Consumer Guide	(neither)
The Evening Post	4/5 stars
Muzik	7/10
NME	6/10
Spin	8/10

Blow Your Headphones is the second studio album by The Herbaliser. It was released on Ninja Tune in 1997. It peaked at number 24 on the UK R&B Albums Chart.

== Critical reception ==
In 1999, Ryan Schreiber, the founder and then-editor-in-chief of Pitchfork, wrote that "...Blow Your Headphones was pretty decent, but it was kinda crappy for a Ninja Tune record." In 2015, Fact placed it at number 33 on the "50 Best Trip-Hop Albums of All Time" list.

== Track listing ==
No.	Title	Length
1.	"Opening Credits"	1:29
2.	"The Blend" (featuring What What)	4:46
3.	"Another Mother"	6:47
4.	"Excuse Me"	1:11
5.	"Ginger Jumps the Fence"	5:01
6.	"Put It on Tape"	3:42
7.	"New + Improved" (featuring What What)	3:58
8.	"Mr. Chombee Has the Flaw"	4:17
9.	"Intermission"	1:01
10.	"Saturday Night" (featuring Fabian & Big Ted)	5:06
11.	"Shocker Zulu"	5:15
12.	"Hardcore"	4:30
13.	"Shorty's Judgement"	5:45
14.	"More Styles"	1:40
15.	"A Mother (For Your Mind)"	(Note: uses samples of songs by artists: Lord Finesse feat. Marquee (1995) Skalpel (2000)) 6:37
16.	"Bring It" (featuring What What)	3:59
17.	"Theme from Control Centre (Reprise)"	4:40
18.	"End Credits"	(Note: uses a quote of Timothy Leary: from Psychedelic Prayers: And Other Meditations adapted from "sutra I" of the Tao Te Ching.) 2:15

Japanese edition bonus disc
No.	Title	Length
1.	"Mr. D.J. (Vocal Radio Edit)"	5:54
2.	"40 Winks (No Sleep Vadim! Mix)"	5:36
3.	"New + Improved (Wiseguys Remix)"	4:05

== Personnel ==
Credits adapted from liner notes.

- Jake Wherry – production, mixing
- Ollie Teeba – production, mixing, design concept
- Jonny Cuba – production (3, 15)
- Malachi – production (5, 6, 8)
- Kaidi Tatham – production (11), synthesizer (11)
- What What – vocals (2, 7, 16)
- Fabian – vocals (10)
- Big Ted – vocals (10)
- Patrick Dawes – percussion (8)
- Oliver Parfitt – synthesizer (17)
- No Sleep Nigel – mixing (1–6, 9–11, 13, 14, 16, 18)
- Justin Whillock – mixing (7, 8, 12, 15, 17)
- Openmind – design
- Strictly Kev – design concept
- Nancy Brown – photography
- Suzi Ninja – photography

== Charts ==
Chart	Peak position
UK R&B Albums (OCC)	24
