= Ghost (producer) =

British music producer

Ghost is a Scottish record producer based in London, who primarily produces British hip hop. His stage name is a reference to his tendency to spend a lot of time working in his studio, rather than being seen in public. He has been described by some journalists as one of the UK's top hip hop producers.

Ghost also presented the Midweek Session on London radio station Itch FM.

== Biography ==
Born in Glasgow, Ghost learnt how to produce music using his father's W30 sampling keyboard and Cubase.

Ghost made his debut in 2003 with the Ghost Stories EP. He was runner up in the Glastonbury Unsigned Talent contest in 2007 and had a track featured on the Glastonbury compilation CD for that year. Since 2007 he has been touring and DJing across the UK and Europe, including performances at Glastonbury, Hip Hop Kemp, The Big Chill, Bestival and the Jazz Cafe. He has also worked on a number of side projects, including Lingua Franca and Invisible Inc, a synth/electronic hip hop project with Kashmere and Verb T.

His debut album Seldom Seen Often Heard was described by Rapnews as "a great release which certainly provides value of money and a lot of playback moments". A single from the album, 2006's "Basic Instinct" featured vocals from Abstract Rude. Alternate versions of Ghost's first two albums have been released in Japan. His tracks have been included on several mix CDs and compilations, including DJ Yoda's Fabric Live mix.

Ghost has also remixed tracks for other artists. He released a remix project online entitled Remixes from the Edge, and a collaborative project, Invisible Inc – The Exit Strategy, with Verb T and Kashmere, via his own label, Musicforheads.

Ghost is currently program director at RDU-FM in Christchurch, New Zealand and hosts the Friday Drive Radio Show on RDU every week, focused on hip hop, dubstep, and electronic music.

== Discography ==
=== Albums ===
- Seldom Seen Often Heard (2006, Breakin Bread)
- Seldom Seen Often Heard (2006, CCR Records, Japan)
- My Soul Looks Like This Mix CD (2008, Breakin Bread)
- Freedom of Thought (2009, Breakin Bread)
- Freedom of Thought (2009, Guinness Records, Japan)
- Postcards from the Edge (2010, Musicforheads)

=== EPs and singles ===
- Ghost Stories EP (2003, Breakin Bread)
- Let Em Know EP (2005, Breakin Bread)
- The Payoff EP (2005, Breakin Bread)
- Basic Instinct EP (2006, Breakin Bread)
- It's All Love 7" single (2006, Breakin Bread)
- Freedom of Thought EP (2009, Breakin Bread)
