= FabricLive.39 =

Compilation album by DJ Yoda
- Released: April 2008
- Genre: Hip hop
- Label: Fabric
- Producer: DJ Yoda

DJ Yoda chronology
The Amazing Adventures of DJ Yoda (2006)	FabricLive.39 (2008)	How to Cut & Paste Country & Western Edition (2009)

FabricLive chronology
FabricLive.38 (2008)	FabricLive.39 (2008)	FabricLive.40 (2008)

FabricLive.39 is a 2008 mix album by English hip hop musician and producer DJ Yoda. The album was released as part of the FabricLive Mix Series.

== Track listing ==
1. 2 tracks mixed:
  1. DJ Yoda - Intro - DJ Yoda
  2. The Thunderclaps - Judgement Day (Donkey Work Re-Edit) - Ejectorseat
2. Violent Femmes - Blister in the Sun - Slash Records
3. Skibadee - Tika Toc - Ahead of the Game
4. Handsome Boy Modeling School - Holy Calamity (Bear Witness II) - Tommy Boy
5. Ice Cube - Jackin' For Beats - Priority
6. Ghost - It's all Love - Breakin' Bread
7. Jurassic 5 - Swing Set - Interscope Geffen
8. The Hot 8 Brass Band - Sexual Healing - Tru Thoughts
9. D-Nice - Crumbs on the Table - Zomba
10. Gang Starr - Just To Get a Rep - Virgin
11. 2 tracks mixed:
  1. Jean Jacques Perry - EVA - Vanguard
  2. DJ Yoda & Herve - Bonus Beats - DJ Yoda
12. The Chemical Brothers - Salmon Dance - Virgin
13. The Coral - In the Morning - Deltasonic
14. 2 tracks mixed:
  1. Bell Biv Devoe - Poison - MCA
  2. Tittsworth - Bonus Beats - Tittsworth
15. Run DMC - It's Tricky - Arista
16. 2 tracks mixed:
  1. Salt-n-Pepa - Push It - Island Def Jam
  2. Scottie B - Bonus Beats - Scottie B
17. DJ Class - Tear Da Club Up - Unruly
18. Bonde Do Role - Marina Gasolina - Domino
19. 2 tracks mixed:
  1. Minnie Ripperton - Lovin' You - Capitol Records
  2. Bamabounce - Bonus Beats
20. Collie Buddz - Come Around - Sony BMG
21. DJ Yoda ft. Sway - Chatterbox - Antidote
22. Adam F - Circles - EMI
23. DJ Zinc - Super Sharp Shooter - BMG
24. 3 tracks mixed:
  1. Wiley - Gangsters - Big Dada
  2. Skream - Make Me - Tempa
  3. DJ Yoda - Tip-Toe - Antidote
25. Lord Kitchener - London is the Place for Me - Honest Jons
