= Attack of the Attacking Things =

Studio album by Jean Grae
- Released: August 6, 2002
- Genres: Underground hip-hop, alternative hip-hop
- Length: 43:23
- Label: Third Earth Music
- Producers: Nasain Nahmeen, Mr. Len, Masta Ace, Da Beatminerz, Ev Price, Koichiro

Jean Grae chronology
Attack of the Attacking Things (2002)	The Bootleg of the Bootleg EP (2003)

Professional ratings
Review scores
Source	Rating
AllMusic	4/5 stars
Entertainment Weekly	A−
HipHopDX	4/5 stars
Pitchfork	6.9/10
RapReviews	9/10
Spin	8/10
Vibe	3.5/5 stars

Attack of the Attacking Things is the debut album by American rapper Jean Grae. It was recorded at Da Crib of Hitz, H.A.H, and Project Heat Studios in New York City.

== Critical reception ==
Del F. Cowie of Exclaim! wrote that "this complex and rewarding release proves that [Grae]'s a dope emcee, period." Nathan Rabin of The A.V. Club called it an "auspicious, uncompromising debut" and praised its "depth and substance", while commending Grae for "using her outsider position to level a thorough critique of hip-hop's misogyny and materialism." Harry Allen of The Village Voice observed an "unpolished, handcrafted feel" and wrote "what it lacks in flam and polish, however, Attack makes up for with the determined and singular power of a compelling personal vision; something too frequently missing in the contemporary hip-hop that Black people are widely being paid off to make." The newspaper's Robert Christgau gave the album a one-star honorable mention, indicating "a worthy effort consumers attuned to its overriding aesthetic or individual vision may well like." He cited "God's Gift" and "Live-4-U" as highlights and quipped, "Props for both the Stylistics and *NSync—I like that in an indie rapper".

== Track listing ==
No.	Title	Length
1.	"Intro" (Interlude)	1:14
2.	"What Would I Do" (Produced by Mr. Len.)	3:42
3.	"God's Gift" (Produced by Masta Ace.)	3:55
4.	"Block Party" (Featuring Apani B. Fly. Produced by Nasain Nahmeen.)	6:18
5.	"No Doubt" (Featuring Block McCloud. Produced by Nasain Nahmeen.)	4:27
6.	"Skit (Bubblin')" (Interlude)	0:38
7.	"Thank Ya!" (Produced by Nasain Nahmeen.)	2:59
8.	"Lovesong" (Produced by Da Beatminerz.)	6:08
9.	"Get It" (Produced by Nasain Nahmeen.)	3:52
10.	"Knock" (Produced by Mr. Len.)	3:42
11.	"Live 4 U" (Produced by Ev Price.)	4:32
12.	"Fadeout" (Produced by Koichiro.)	1:47

== Personnel ==
Credits adapted from Allmusic.

- Evil Dee – engineer, mixing, producer
- Jean Grae – vocals
- Masta Ace – producer
- Block McCloud – engineer, mixing, primary artist, vocals
- Mr. Len – cut, producer
- Mr. Walt – producer
- Evan Price – producer
