= FabricLive.38 =

Compilation album by DJ Craze
- Released: February 2008
- Genre: DJ
- Label: Fabric
- Producer: DJ Craze

DJ Craze chronology
Miami Heat (2005)	FabricLive.38 (2008)

FabricLive chronology
FabricLive.37 (2007)	FabricLive.38 (2007)	FabricLive.39 (2008)

Professional ratings
Review scores
Source	Rating
PopMatters	5/10 stars

FabricLive.38 is a DJ mix compilation album by DJ Craze, as part of the FabricLive Mix Series.

== Track listing ==
1. Craze - Intro Ft. Armanni Reign - Craze
2. N.O.R.E. - Set It Off Ft. Swizz Beatz and J. Ru$$ - Babygrande
3. The Cool Kids - I Rock - Chocolate Industries
4. The Cool Kids - Black Mags - Chocolate Industries
5. Bangers and Cash - Loose - Downtown
6. Tuff Crew - My Part Of Town - Warlock
7. Jan Hammer - Miami Vice Theme - Universal
8. 2 tracks mixed:
  1. Miami Jam Crew - Pretty Girls - Midtown
  2. DJ Blaqstarr - Shake It To The Ground Ft. Rye Rye (Acapella) - Mad Decent
9. Lushus - Ho Fo Sho - Craze
10. The Beat Club - Security - Warners
11. Chromeo - Bonafied Lovin' (Eli Escobar Remix Ft. Pase Rock) - Back Yard
12. Treasure Fingers - Cross The Dancefloor - Treasure Fingers
13. DJ Blaqstarr - Supastarr - Mad Decent
14. Coldcut - True Skool Ft. Roots Manuva (Switch Remix) - Ninja Tune
15. Earth, Wind & Fire - Brazilian Rhyme - Sony
16. Armand Van Helden - I Want Your Soul - Ministry Of Sound
17. Debbie Deb - When I Hear Music - Pandisc
18. Magic Mike - Magic Mike Cutz The Record - Cheetah
19. Quadrant Six - Body Mechanic - Atlantic
20. DJ Laz - Red Alert - Pandisc
21. Fresh Celeste and M4 Sers - Give It All To me - JR Records
22. Bangers And Cash - Shake That - "Downtown"
23. The Pase Rock - Lindsay Lohan's Revenge (Klever Remix) - Fully Fitted
24. Kazey & Bulldog - Big Truck - Dress-2-Sweat
25. The Chemical Brothers - Get Yourself High (Switches Rely on Rub) - EMI
26. Kid Sister - Pro Nails Rusko Remix feat. Kanye West - Fools Gold
27. DJ Assault - Pushin' (Deekline, Wizard & Freq Nasty Mix) - Rat
