= How to Cut and Paste Mix Tape Vol.2 =

Compilation album

Compilation album by DJ Yoda
- Released: 2001
- Genre: Hip-hop
- Label: Antidote; ANTCD101

DJ Yoda chronology
How to Cut and Paste Mix Tape Vol.1 (2001)	How to Cut and Paste Mix Tape Vol.2 (2001)	How to Cut & Paste: The 80's Edition (2003)

How to Cut and Paste Mix Tape Vol.2 is the second DJ mix album mixed by DJ Yoda.

== Track listing ==
1. "Intro" / "Star Wars Theme" (featuring Crash Crew) - DJ Yoda
2. "Ill Culinary Behaviour" - DJ Format
3. "Creatures, Breakin' and Names" (featuring Laura Lee, Jimmy Castor Bunch & New Birth) - DJ Yoda
4. "Glue" (featuring Biz Markie & Mr. Complex) - Beyond There
5. "Cucumbers, Needles, Sandwiches & Jazz" (featuring Freda Payne, Johnny Guitar Watson, Martine Girault, the Delfonics & Charlie Parker Septet) - DJ Yoda
6. "Lonely Piano" (featuring - Grinning Barns) - Quasimoto
7. "Yoda Meets the A-Team" - DJ Yoda
8. "Scratching & Keyboard Techniques" (featuring Dizzy Gillespie) - DJ Yoda
9. "Quid Control" (featuring People Under The Stairs) - DJ Yoda
10. "Mysterious Plot" (featuring Lee Dorsey) - DJ Yoda
11. "Billie Holiday Turntablised" - DJ Yoda
12. "We Got The Funk" - The Beatnuts
13. "On the Reggae-lar Part 2" (featuring Honey Boy Martin, Don Drummond, Dandy Livingstone, the Cimmarons, Hopeton Lewis, Pat Kelly & the Uniques) - DJ Yoda
14. "I Gotcha Opin" (Remix) - Black Moon
15. "Drop" - The Pharcyde
16. "One Two S**t" - A Tribe Called Quest
17. "Only When I'm Drunk" - Tha Alkaholiks
18. "Anything" (featuring Wu-Tang Clan) - SWV
19. "C.R.E.A.M." - Wu-Tang Clan
20. "Tony Mozzarelli Wants 80's Pop" / "The Godfather" - DJ Yoda
21. "Yoda's 80's Pop Megamix" (featuring Rick Astley, Bomb the Bass, Hall & Oates, Five Star & Taylor Dayne) - DJ Yoda
22. "Rhubarb Tart" (featuring John Cleese) - DJ Yoda
23. "George Formby Turntablised" - DJ Yoda
24. "Outro / Indiana Jones Theme" (featuring - Evelyn Glennie) - DJ Yoda

== Reception ==
The album was positively received, with AllMusic giving it a four star review, describing it as " a combination DJ-technique workshop, hip-hop compilation and adolescent joke-fest".
