= The Bootleg of the Bootleg EP =

The Bootleg Of The Bootleg EP

EP by Jean Grae
- Released: October 7, 2003
- Genre: Underground hip-hop
- Length: 65:42
- Label: Babygrande
- Producer: Bravo, William Tell, Block McCloud, Ruddy Rock

Jean Grae chronology
Attack of the Attacking Things (2002)	The Bootleg Of The Bootleg EP (2003)	This Week (2004)

The Bootleg of the Bootleg EP is an extended play by American rapper Jean Grae, released on October 7, 2003, by Babygrande Records. It was recorded at Building Block Studio, The Bar Upstairs, and The BK FireHouse in New York City.

== Critical reception ==
Professional ratings
Review scores
Source	Rating
AllMusic	3.5/5 stars
Robert Christgau	A−
Entertainment Weekly	A−
Pitchfork	7.9/10
RapReviews	7.5/10
Spin	B+

Allmusic's Andy Kellman felt that, despite the "weak spot" "Swing Blades" and a 45-minute hidden track of freestyles and "stray material", the EP's strong textures and soul samples suit "Grae's tough, agile, nothing-fancy flow." Michael Endelman of Entertainment Weekly praised Grae's "long strings of witty disses and unflinching self-analysis", and wrote that she has "skills to spare." Del F. Cowie of Exclaim! found her "cast-offs" to be better than most other rappers' "Grade A material" and asserted that "Grae has not only maintained her profile but has a made a strong case to be considered one of the most versatile MCs around." Robert Christgau of The Village Voice found the EP "looser in theme and execution, and also better than" her debut album, and wrote of Grae's change:

Throughout the six official songs she's all rage, bile, and despair, 150 degrees from the bootstraps autobiography and positive shout-outs of her debut; throughout, her dense, explosive literacy gurgles from the beats like an underground brook.

J. Victoria Sanders of PopMatters said that, although "it’s clear she's not afraid of being a maverick or holding her own on the mic", Grae is held back by her "monotone delivery" and, "even with a seamless style, it can be hard not to get distracted from her soft, linear rhyme slipping."

== Track listing ==
No.	Title	Length
1.	"Hater's Anthem"	5:13
2.	"Take Me"	3:36
3.	"Swing Blades" (Featuring Cannibal Ox.)	2:28
4.	"My Crew"	5:23
5.	"Code Red" (Featuring Block McCloud and Pumpkinhead.)	3:51
6.	"Chapter One: Destiny"	45:09

=== Chapter One: Destiny ===
No.	Title	Length
1.	"Breath Easy" (Samples beat from "Lyrical Exercise" by Jay-Z)
2.	"A Little Story" (Samples beat from "Day One" by D.I.T.C.)
3.	"You Don't Want It" (Samples beat from "Role Model" by Eminem)
4.	"Excuse Me Sir" (Samples beat from "Excuse Me Miss" by Jay-Z)
5.	"High" (Samples beat from "Purple" by Nas)
6.	"Keep Livin" (Samples beat from "On My Block" by Scarface)
7.	"You Don't Know" (Samples beat from "U Don't Know" by Jay-Z)
8.	"Bum Deal" (Featuring Natural Resource)
9.	"Negro Baseball League" (Featuring Natural Resource)
10.	"Dichotomy" (Featuring Pumpkinhead)
11.	"Spittin' Bars" (Featuring Bad Seed and Pumpkinhead)
12.	"Pure Hell" (Featuring Bad Seed and Pumpkinhead)	5:14

== Personnel ==
Credits adapted from Allmusic.

- Cannibal Ox – featured artist
- Jeff Chenault – design
- Dave Dar – mixing
- W. Eugene Davis – composer
- Zvi Edelman – A&R
- Jean Grae – primary artist
- T.J. Graham – composer
- Charles "Chase" Jones – promoter
- Emily Lazar – mastering
- Block McCloud – featured artist, mixing, producer
- Pumpkinhead – featured artist
- Sarah Register – assistant mastering engineer
- Ruddy Rock – A&R, executive producer, producer
- Jesse Stone – marketing
- William Tell – producer
- Chuck Wilson – executive producer
