= Will Tell =

Puerto Rican hip-hop producer (born 1973)

William Davis (born January 3, 1973), known professionally as Will Tell, is a Puerto Rican hip-hop producer. Adopted at an early age, he was raised in Brooklyn, New York. Will Tell’s lifelong journey with hip-hop music and culture began with attending talent shows at High School Redirection in Brownsville, where his mother was a teacher.

As a music producer, he has collaborated with Run DMC, Dres (Black Sheep), Jarobi (A Tribe called Quest), Sadat X (Brand Nubian), Talib Kweli, Sean Price, General Steele, Sticky Fingaz (ONYX), Mobb Deep, Rhazel (The Roots), Rhymefest, Ruste Juxx, Thirstin Howl III, Jean Grae, Planet Asia, Killah Priest (Wu Tang Clan), R.A. the Rugged Man, A.F.R.O., Hopsin, Hurricane G, Wordsworth, Shabam Sahdeeq, The Bad Seed, Funkmaster Flex, Tony Touch, Dave Chappelle, Brooklyn Academy, Word A’ Mouth, Dysfunctional Family, Pumpkinhead, C-Rayz Wallz, Milano, MF Grimm, Diobolique, and more.

In 2009, Will Tell and Sadat X created and developed the Brooklyn based wine tasting web series with a hip-hop spin called "True Wine Connnoisseurs.

== Discography ==
=== Albums ===
2011: No Features (Sadat X)
2010: Planet of the Grapes (Sadat X)
2008: Generation X (Sadat X)

=== Compilation albums ===
2004: Will Tell Vol. 10 - Academics
2004: Will Tell Vol. 9 - The Academy Awards
2003: Will Tell Vol. 8 - Soundscam
2002: Will Tell Vol. 7 - M.V.L.L.
2002: Will Tell Vol. 6 - The Best Icon
2001: Will Tell Vol. 5 - Unsigned Grime
2001: Will Tell Vol. 4 - Ready N Willin
2000: Will Tell Vol. 3 - Where There's a Will, There's a Way
1999: Will Tell Vol. 2 - Time Will Tell
1998: Will Tell Vol. 1 - Will Power

=== Collaborative albums ===
2017: Skillmatic (Thirstin Howl III)

- Skillmatic featuring Prodigy (Mobb Deep)
- Crime Lords featuring Sticky Fingers (Onyx)
- Old Gold Cipher featuring Richie Balance
- Barbaric Merits featuring Spit Gemz

2016: AGUA (Sadat X)

- Taken
- Industry Outcasts featuring R.A. the Rugged Man and Thirstin Howl III
- Agua
- Cut and Dry featuring Brand Nubian
- Imagine featuring Rhymefest
- Murder Soundtrack featuring A.F.R.O.
- Tommy is my Boy

2013: Legends Never Die (R.A. the Rugged Man)

- Tom Thumb featuring Tom Thumb
- Underground Hits featuring Hopsin and Ruste Juxx

2012: Love, Hell or Right (Sadat X)

- We Right Here featuring Dres (Black Sheep) and Jarobi (A Tribe Called Quest)

2012: Dysfunkshunal Familee (Family Reunion)

- I'm Dysfunkshunal featuring Sadat X

2011: Speed of Life (A Tribe called Quest and Black Sheep as Evitan)

- The Three Kings featuring Sadat X

2010: Wild Cowboys II (Sadat X)

- Return of the Bang Bang
- Nuclear Bomb
- Swerve featuring Swerv
- We Kewl

2010: Brown Water (The Bad Seed)

- Can Ya Hear Me

2010: Mami and Papi (Thirstin Howl III)

- I Love NY featuring Tony Touch and Hurricane G

2009: Natural born Skiller (Thirstin Howl III)

- Double Dosage featuring Sean Price and General Steele

2008: Sidewalk Stories (Milano)

- Take it Off
- Stay Low
- And Now

2007: The Beautiful Mix Tape (Talib Kweli)

- Style Wars (Remix) featuring Dave Chappelle

2006: Spittin Image (Block McClouds)

- Block Star
- Master's Degree featuring Killah Priest (Wu Tang Clan), Jean Grae and Pumpkinhead
- No You Won't featuring O.D.
- Chaos

2005: This Week (Jean Grae)

- Style Wars
- All album skits

2005: Skillitary (Thirstin Howl III)

- Party for Free featuring Sadat X

2003: Bootleg of the Bootleg (Jean Grae)

- Take Me (Top 25 on Billboards Rap Singles)

2003: For the Kids (The Bad Seed)

- They Love Me single (Top Ten on Billboards Rap Singles)

2003: The Mix Tape (FunkMaster Flex)

- They Love Me by Bad Seed

2002: A Beautiful Mind (Pumpkinhead)

- Park Slope
- Brooklyn Academy
- The Beginning
