= FabricLive.26 =

Compilation album by The Herbaliser
- Released: 6 February 2006
- Genres: Hip hop, funk
- Length: 70:24
- Label: Fabric
- Producer: The Herbaliser

The Herbaliser chronology
Take London (2005)	FabricLive.26 (2006)	Same as It Never Was (2008)

FabricLive chronology
FabricLive.25 (2005)	FabricLive.26 (2006)	FabricLive.27 (2006)

FabricLive.26 is a DJ mix album, mixed by English band The Herbaliser, recorded as part of the FabricLive albums and released on the Fabric label in February 2006.

== Track listing ==
1. Million Dan - "Dogz n Sledgez"
2. J-Sands (of The Lone Catalysts) - "Southern Lady"
3. 2 tracks mixed
  - RJD2 - "Ghostwriter"
  - Dynamic Syncopation - "Ground Zero" (feat. Mass Influence)
4. Blufoot - "Alphabet Man" (feat. Yungun)
5. Hurby's Machine - "I Got an Attitude" (feat. Antoinette)
6. Harry Love - "Surprize" (feat. Verb. T, Yungun & Mystro)
7. 2 tracks mixed
  - The Herbaliser - "None Other" (feat. Cappo)
  - DJ Format - "3 Feet Deep (Instrumental)" (feat. Abdominal & D-Sisive)
8. James Brown - "Talkin' Loud and Sayin' Nothing"
9. Lefties Soul Connection - "Welly Wanging"
10. J Rocc - "Play this (One)"
11. Eric B. & Rakim - "Paid in Full (Seven Minutes of Madness)" (Coldcut Remix)
12. Demon Boyz - "Glimity Glamity"
13. Cappo - "I.D.S.T."
14. The Nextmen - "Spin it Round" (feat. Dynamite MC)
15. The Jackson 5 - It's Great to be Here
16. Breakestra - "Family Rap" (feat. Chali 2na, Soup, Double K, Wolf & Munyungo Jackson)
17. Apathy - "It Takes a Seven Nation Army to Hold Us Back" (feat. Emilio Lopez)
18. The Herbaliser - "Gadget Funk"
19. Flying Fish - "Mr Matatwe" (Keep It Up)
20. Hero No.7 - "Keeping it Real?"
21. The Roots - "Boom!"
22. Dynamix 2 - "Just Give the DJ a Break" (12 Club Version)
23. Diplo - "Newsflash" (feat. Sandra Melody)
24. Bugz in the Attic - "Booty La La"

== Miscellanea ==
The Apathy track "It Takes a Seven Nation Army to Hold Us Back" is based on a sample of The White Stripes track, Seven Nation Army, and takes its title from that track combined with the Public Enemy album It Takes a Nation of Millions to Hold Us Back.
