= How to Cut & Paste: The Thirties Edition =

Compilation album by DJ Yoda
- Released: August 25, 2009
- Genre: Rap
- Label: Antidote Records

DJ Yoda chronology
How to Cut & Paste: Country & Western Edition (2009)	How to Cut & Paste: The Thirties Edition (2009)

How to Cut & Paste: The Thirties Edition is a studio album mixed by DJ Yoda. It is the fifth album in his Cut & Paste series.

== Track listing ==
1. Danny Kaye - "Beatin Bangin Scratchin"
2. Benny Goodman - "One O'Clock Jump"
3. Danny Kaye - "Ballin The Jack"
4. Louis Armstrong - "Cheesecake"
5. Cab Calloway - "Minnie The Moocher"
6. Thelonious Monk - "Black And Tan Fantasy"
7. Thelonious Monk - "Caravan"
8. Moondog - "Lament 1, Birds Lament"
9. Jeri Southern - "An Occasional Man"
10. Duke of Iron (Cecil Anderson) - "Ugly Woman"
11. Slim Gaillard - "Yip Roc Heresy"
12. Benny Goodman - "Ding Dong Daddy"
13. Champion Jack Dupree - "Walking The Blues"
14. Fats Waller - "Reefer Song"
15. Cab Calloway - "Reefer Man"
16. Duke Ellington - "Don't Mean a Thing"
17. Henry Thomas - "Red River Blues"
18. Harry McClintock - "Big Rock Candy Mountain"
19. Vera Ward Hall - "Trouble So Hard"
20. Bessie Jones - "Sometimes"
21. Robert Johnson - "Hellhound on my Trail"
22. The Marx Brothers - "Hello I must be Going"
