= Take London =

Studio album by The Herbaliser
- Released: 31 May 2005
- Genre: Hip hop
- Length: 60:41
- Label: Ninja Tune
- Producer: Jake Wherry, Ollie Teeba

The Herbaliser chronology
Herbal Blend (2003)	Take London (2005)	FabricLive.26 (2006)

Singles from Take London
- 1. "Generals" Released: 2005; 2. "Nah' Mean Nah'm Sayin'" Released: 2005

Professional ratings
Review scores
Source	Rating
AllMusic	3.5/5 stars

Take London is the fifth studio album by The Herbaliser. It was released on Ninja Tune in 2005.

== Critical reception ==
John Bush of AllMusic gave the album 3.5 stars out of 5, saying, "Ninja Tune fans may not have wished to hear a crucial production unit like the Herbaliser going down the same road already traveled by the Cinematic Orchestra and Chris Bowden, but the talents of all involved (especially [Jake] Wherry and [Ollie] Teeba) put this record over the top."

== Track listing ==
No.	Title	Length
1.	"Take London (Intro)"	0:32
2.	"Nah' Mean, Nah'm Sayin'" (featuring Jean Grae)	4:01
3.	"Song for Mary"	5:16
4.	"Generals" (featuring Trap Clappa, Cheech Marina, Daddy Mills, A.K., MacGuyver, and Jean Grae)	3:55
5.	"Gadget Funk"	4:07
6.	"Failure's No Option" (featuring Cappo)	3:01
7.	"Lord Lord" (featuring Roots Manuva)	4:08
8.	"Man Who Knows (Interlude)"	0:21
9.	"Kittyknapper"	2:37
10.	"Geddim'!!"	4:56
11.	"If You Close Your Eyes" (featuring Jean Grae)	4:25
12.	"Sonofanothamutha"	8:17
13.	"Twice Around" (featuring Jean Grae)	3:56
14.	"I Know a Bloke (Interlude)"	0:21
15.	"8 Men Strong"	5:14
16.	"Serge" (featuring Katerine)	5:34

Limited edition bonus disc
No.	Title	Length
1.	"More Tea, More Beer" (featuring Jean Grae)	2:37
2.	"Meteroic" (featuring Cappo)	2:50
3.	"I Am" (featuring Wildflower)	4:06
4.	"How to Keep a Girlfriend" (featuring Jean Grae)	4:15
5.	"None Other" (featuring Cappo)	3:30

== Charts ==
Chart	Peak position
French Albums (SNEP)	58
