= The Amazing Adventures of DJ Yoda =

Compilation album by DJ Yoda
- Released: 2 October 2006
- Genre: Hip-hop; electronica; trip hop
- Label: Antidote

DJ Yoda chronology
Unthugged (2003)	The Amazing Adventures of DJ Yoda (2006)	FabricLive.39 (2008)

The Amazing Adventures of DJ Yoda is the fourth studio album mixed by DJ Yoda.

== Track listing ==
1. Intro
2. He's A Nutbag
3. Wheels
4. Fertilizer
5. Breakfast Cereal ft. Biz Markie
6. Yoda In Reverse
7. Playin' Around ft. Jungle Brothers
8. Cuban Brothers FM
9. Let's Get Old ft. Princess Superstar
10. Fiddy
11. Holdin' Down The Block ft. Andy Cooper
12. Haunted House ft. Biz Markie
13. Bargain Hunters
14. Chatterbox ft. Sway
15. Tip Toe
16. Luke's Advice
17. Brush Off ft. Aspects
18. Zipper Scratch
19. Fresh Fly Fellas ft. Apathy, Kwest & Celph Titled
20. Duellin' Banjos
21. SALAAM ft. MC Paul Barman
22. Just Practising
23. Pussy Cat ft. Mr. David Viner
24. Darn That's The End
25. Muted Cartoons ft. Akinyele
