= Scratch: The Ultimate DJ =

- Developers: 7 Studios, Bedlam Games
- Publishers: Genius Products, Genco Media, Numark Industries
- Platforms: PlayStation 3, Xbox 360, iOS, Microsoft Windows
- Release: Cancelled
- Genre: Music

Scratch: The Ultimate DJ was a music video game announced by Genius Products in 2008. Similarly to Konami's Beatmania series, it would have employed a specialized turntable controller (called the "Scratch Deck"), which would have allowed the player to follow along to the rhythm game while simulating common DJ techniques, such as scratching.

The game had been held up in legal action between publisher Genius Products and former developer 7 Studios. A replacement developer, Bedlam Games had been announced following the lawsuit and the source code was returned to Genius as per a legal order.

On May 26, 2010, Numark announced that the game was coming to the iPhone, iPad and Microsoft Windows and were due for release later that year. However, nothing was released.

In September 2011, Bedlam Games laid off 90% of its staff and later shut its doors.

Since the closure of Bedlam, none of the parties have given any sort of statement regarding the future of the game. As of June 11, 2014 the website for Scratch no longer exists.

== Legal conflicts ==
On April 15, 2009, the publishers of Scratch: The Ultimate DJ, Genius Products and Numark, sued against Scratch's developer, 7 Studios and Activision. The lawsuit contends that Activision purchased 7 Studios to both gain access to proprietary technology and to delay publication of the game so DJ Hero could come out first. The Los Angeles Superior Court in which the suit was filed did not grant the requested restraining order against Activision on DJ Hero. Activision states that Scratch was already delayed by as early as October 2008, before they made contact with 7 Studios, and their acquisition of the developers did not impede them from completing Scratch. However, on April 20, the court reversed its decision, awarding Genius and Numark a temporary restraining order, and ordered the "immediate return" of all of the material from 7 Studios from Activision, including all source code related to Scratch. 7 Studios subsequently filed a counter-suit against Genius Products, claiming that they engaged in "unlawful and unsavoury business practices" that limited 7 Studios from completing the game as planned.

== Set list ==
The songs below had been confirmed to be in the game.

Song title	Artist
"Peter Piper"	Run-D.M.C.
"Intergalactic"	Beastie Boys
"Flashing Lights"	Kanye West
"Don't Sweat the Technique"	Eric B. & Rakim
"Friends"	Whodini
"Hot In Herre"	Nelly
"Push It"	Salt N Pepa
"B.O.B. (Bombs Over Baghdad)"	Outkast
"Let's Get It Started"	The Black Eyed Peas
"Lookin' Fly"	Murs
"Feel Good Inc."	Gorillaz
"Mastermind"	Deltron 3030
"Life in a Cage"	The Knux
"Iced Lightning"	RJD2
"Gifted"	N.A.S.A.
"Skanky Panky"	Kid Koala

In addition to these songs, Genius had announced that the game would include music from Gorillaz, Deltron 3030, Snoop Dogg and Mix Master Mike.

== See also ==
- DJ Hero, a similar game released that was developed by FreeStyleGames for Activision
