= How to Cut and Paste Mix Tape Vol.1 =

Compilation album by DJ Yoda

Mixtape by DJ Yoda
- Released: 2001
- Genre: Hip-hop
- Length: 60:50
- Labels: Antidote; ANTCD100

DJ Yoda chronology
How to Cut and Paste Mix Tape Vol.1 (2001)	How to Cut and Paste Mix Tape Vol.2 (2002)

How to Cut and Paste Mix Tape Vol.1 is a mixtape album released by DJ Yoda on the Antidote label in 2001.

== Track listing ==
1. Intro – Various Artists
2. It's a Stickup – Drummond, Willus
3. Irritating Dove – DJ Yoda & Cymande/Bob James
4. Eye on the Gold Chain – Ugly Duckling (2)
5. Gotta Rock – Stupid Poo & Treacherous 3/Kool Moe Dee
6. Scratch Skit – DJ Plus One
7. Mexican Policemen At The Alien Mardi Gras – DJ Yoda & Bob James
8. Yoda Meets the Thunderbirds – DJ Yoda
9. Roll With The Yaggfu – Yaggfu Front
10. Dunes And Sounds – DJ Yoda & Bob James
11. Scratch Skit 2 – DJ Benny G
12. Delta Ebonics – DJ Yoda
13. Give It To Y'all – Rock, Pete & Rocky Marciano/Trife
14. Perverted Disturbances – DJ Yoda & Cymande/Rimshots/Bob James
15. Salvation Barmy – Barman, MC Paul
16. Scratch Skit 3 – A-Trak
17. Sesame Sex – DJ Yoda
18. Global Warming – Nextmen & Kerosene
19. Jiving Question Remains – DJ Yoda & Bob James
20. Something For The People – Nigo & Biz Markie
21. Sugarhill Commercial – Various Artists
22. Scratch Skit 4 – DJ Spinbad
23. Dizzy Gillespie Plays The Sax – DJ Yoda & Dizzy Gillespie/Cymande/Parliament
24. Balti Taxi – DJ Yoda & Bob James
25. Astronaut – Quasimoto
26. Yoda Meets Dr Who – DJ Yoda
27. On The Reggae – Lar & Dennis Alcapone/Desmond Dekker/Harry J Allstars/Sly &The Revolutionaries/Roots Radics
28. Back Up – King Tee & Phil The Agony
29. Golf Food And Scratching – DJ Yoda & Fatback Band/Mother Freedom Band/Cymande
30. Mic Manipulator – Edan
31. French Collection – DJ Yoda & Bob James
32. Goin' To See My Baby – Car Trouble & William De Vaughan/Fatback Band
33. Automobile – Parliament
34. Scratch Skit 5 – DJ Yoda
35. Outro – Various Artists

== Reception ==
Professional ratings
Review scores
Source	Rating
AllMusic	4/5 stars

Rick Anderson of All Music Guide called How to Cut and Paste Vol.1 "a master class in DJ technique" which also demonstrates the humour that DJ Yoda is known for.
