= FabricLive.37 =

Compilation album by Caspa and Rusko
- Released: 10 December 2007
- Genre: Dubstep
- Label: Fabric
- Producer: Caspa & Rusko

FabricLive chronology
FabricLive.36 (2007)	FabricLive.37 (2007)	FabricLive.38 (2008)

Professional ratings
Review scores
Source	Rating
AllMusic	4/5 stars
Pitchfork	7.2/10

FabricLive.37 is a 2007 album by the British dubstep producers Caspa and Rusko. The album was released as part of the FabricLive Mix Series and was the first edition of the series to feature the dubstep genre of electronic music. Some of the tracks feature samples from the Guy Ritchie film Snatch, the Nick Love film The Business, the TV series The Armando Iannucci Shows and Willy Wonka & the Chocolate Factory. The album featured other notable primarily dubstep producers such as Skream, Coki, Buraka Som Sistema and many more.

== Reception ==
Red Bull Music UK described FabricLive.37 as "changing the course of [dubstep]", while Will Pritchard of Pitchfork wrote that it "helped transform dubstep from a bubbling scene to a global phenomenon".

== Track listing ==
No.	Title	Writer/Producer	Label	Length
1	Born To Do It	Caspa	Sub Soldiers	3:09
2	Girl From Codeine City	L-Wiz (Claes Rosén & Ola Näslund)	Dub Police	2:41
3	Cockney Violin	Caspa	Dub Police	2:41
4	Round the World Girls (Tes La Rok Remix)	Uncle Sam, Tes La Rok	Argon	1:59
5	Jahova	Rusko	Sub Soldiers	1:48
6	The Terminator	Caspa	Sub Soldiers	2:27
7	The Legacy	Cotti & Cluekid	-30	1:14
8	50,000 Watts VIP	Matty G	Argon	1:13
9	Africa VIP	The Others	Dub Police	3:34
10	V	Distance	Chest Plate	0:53
11	Big Headed Slags	Caspa	Sub Soldiers	2:10
12	Too Far	Rusko	Sub Soldiers	2:00
13	SpongeBob	Coki	DMZ	1:20
14	Louder	Caspa	Pitch Black	3:35
15	Well 'Ard	Caspa & The Others	Sub Soldiers	2:27
16	The Drop	Unitz	Dub Police	2:17
17	Hammer Time	Rusko	Sub Soldiers	2:32
18	Mr. Chips	Rusko	Dubplate	2:13
19	Look At My Eyes	Orien	Dub Police	1:47
20	Fun House	The Others	Dub Police	0:53
21	2 N A Q	Rusko	Sub Soldiers	1:25
22	Cockney Thug	Rusko	Sub Soldiers	2:05
23	Cockney Thug (Buraka Som Sistema Remix)	Buraka Som Sistema	Sub Soldiers	2:14
24	Guru (Power Hour)	Skream	Tempa	2:12
25	Beta Max	Rusko	Dubplate	2:41
26	I'm Lovin'	D1	Tempa	2:30
27	Rock Bottom	Caspa & Rusko	Destructive	3:23
28	Rainbow Tear Drops	Orien	Dub Police	3:06
29	Forever	ConQuest	Dub Police	6:49
