= The Herbaliser =

English jazz hip hop group

- Also known as: The Herbaliser Band
- Origin: London, England
- Genres: Hip hop, jazz, funk
- Years active: 1995–2021
- Labels: Ninja Tune, !K7
- Members: Ollie Teeba; Jake Wherry
- Website: herbaliser.com

The Herbaliser were an English jazz hip hop group formed by Jake Wherry and Ollie Teeba in London, England during the early 1990s. Although currently releasing on their own label and having previously been signed to !K7 Records, they were one of the best-known acts from the Ninja Tune independent record label. They have released 12 albums, including two DJ mixes: one for Ninja Tune's Solid Steel series and the other for Fabric's Live Mix series. The Herbaliser's album Same As It Never Was was their first release on !K7 Records. Their latest album Bring Out The Sound was released in 2018, on the BBE label.

Jake Wherry has also recorded solo tracks as The Meateaters, released on the Parisian Big Cheese label, and has worked with The Propheteers.

Ollie Teeba is also part of Soundsci with Jonny Cuba of Dynamic Syncopation, Audessey ex-Mass Influence, U-George The Hemisphere and Oxygen Sputnick Brown

== History ==
Jake Wherry grew up in South West London and played guitar and bass in a number of jazz, funk and rock bands in his teenage years. During this time, he met Patrick Carpenter aka PC, later one of the DJs behind DJ Food, and through him became aware of the Ninja Tune label. Ollie Teeba, (real name Oliver Lawrence Trattles) began DJing at 15 and played his first live sets to London audiences a year later.

Wherry and Teeba met years later at Wherry's Traintrax studio, and began recording together, collaborating with DJ Malachi, Kaidi Tatham of Bugz in the Attic and Ralph Lamb of Easy Access Orchestra. They developed a jazzy instrumental style of hip hop, due to an absence of available rappers. They passed their recordings on to Ninja Tune bosses Matt Black and Jonathan More of Coldcut and were signed shortly thereafter.

Inspired by the funk bands of previous decades, rather than performing simply with turntables, Jake Wherry decided to take a seven piece band on tour, which included Tatham, Lamb, Andrew Ross, Micah Moody Jnr and percussionist Patrick Dawes. The band performed in Toronto, Ontario on 1999.

As they progressed, they gained access to guest vocalists for appearances on their records, including What? What? (aka Jean Grae), Roots Manuva, MF Doom, Seaming To, Rakaa Iriscience of Dilated Peoples, Blade, Phi Life Cypher, Bahamadia, Dream Warriors and Insight.

The pair were subsequently employed to produce music for the likes of Motorola, the soundtracks to Guy Ritchie's Snatch and the PlayStation 2 game Tony Hawk's Underground. They were also commissioned to write the theme for ESPN's primetime NFL show Sunday Night Football.

The group have also provided production for artists including T Love, Princess Superstar and remixes for artists including DJ Food, Raw Stylus, Push Button Objects, Jaffa and label-mates Coldcut's "Atomic Moog", which reached number one on the UK singles chart.

In 2009, the band released its second live band album, Session Two. This was recorded at The Easy Access Orchestra's studio and mixed at Jake's Train Trax Studio.

Jake Wherry was featured in the Gimlet Media podcast Heavyweight featuring the collaborative production of a track with a fan. Since 2021, Wherry has been working on tracks with Portuguese-British singer Maya Blandy, with "Stardust", her debut track released in 2023, featuring house vocalist Kathy Brown.

== Discography ==
=== Albums ===
As The Herbaliser:

- Remedies (1995, Ninja Tune)
- Blow Your Headphones (1997, Ninja Tune)
- Very Mercenary (1999, Ninja Tune)
- Something Wicked this Way Comes (2002, Ninja Tune)
- Take London (2005, Ninja Tune)
- Same As It Never Was (2008, !K7 Records)
- There Were Seven (2012, Department H.)
- Bring Out The Sound (2018, BBE)

As The Herbaliser Band:

- Session One (2000, Department H.)
- Session Two (2009, !K7 Records)

DJ mix albums:

- Solid Steel Presents Herbal Blend (2003, Ninja Tune)
- FabricLive.26 (2006, Fabric)

=== Compilations ===
- Herbal Tonic (2010, Ninja Tune)

=== EPs ===
- The Real Killer/Blow It EP (1995)
- Repetitive Loop/Scratchy Noise EP (1995)
- The Flawed Hip-Hop EP (1996)
- New & Improved/Control Centre (1997)
- The Blend EP (1997)
- Wall Crawling Giant Insect Breaks EP (1998)
- Road of Many Signs/Moon Sequence EP (1999)
- Missing Suitcase EP (1999)
- 8 Point Agenda/Who's Really The Reallest? EP (1999)
- Good Girl Gone Bad EP (1999)
- Time 2 Build EP (1999)

=== Music videos ===
- The Blend, Directed by Unknown (1997)
- Wall Crawling Giant Insect Breaks, Directed by The Light Surgeons (1998)
- Atomic Moog 2000 (Post Nuclear Afterlife Lounge Mix), Directed by Channel Zero (1998)
- The Missing Suitcase, Directed by Jake Knight & Eye Candy (1999)
- Road of Many Signs (Ver. 1), Directed by Rob Heydon (1999)
- Road of Many Signs (Ver, 2), Directed by Unknown (1999)
- Something Wicked, Directed by Mao Mao (2002)
- Generals (Clean & Explicit Versions), Directed by Chris Ratcliffe (2005)
