= DJ Blakey =

English DJ (born 1985)

- Born: Richard Blake
- Origin: London, UK
- Genres: DJ
- Years active: 1999–present
- Website: https://soundcloud.com/djblakeyuk

DJ Blakey (born 3 September 1985) is a DJ from London, England. He won the UK DMC final in 2004.

== Career ==
Between 2004 and 2007, he hosted a weekly show on BBC 1Xtra.

He has held a residency at Fabric, London.

In 2007 he supported Jurassic 5 throughout their entire UK tour, and has also supported Nas in 2007 at the Bristol Academy, and Jay-Z in 2004 at the Prince's Trust Urban Music Festival.

He was employed by FreeStyleGames, a subsidiary of Activision, where he was working closely on the video game DJ Hero.

He collaborated with composer Daniel Pemberton as a scratch DJ on the score for the movies Spider-Man: Into the Spider-Verse and Spider-Man: Across the Spider-Verse.

== Trivia ==
- He contributed the first ever "Mini Mix" on Annie Mac's BBC Radio 1 show, days before competing in the 2004 DMC World Final.
- In 2001 at the UK ITF Final at Cargo nightclub in Shoreditch, London, he was asked to fill the place of a non showing DJ, as he had a bag of records with him. He placed 3rd.

== Discography ==
=== Singles ===
- If You See Me / Back Then (Slime Recordings) (Summer 2012)
