= Millennium Metaphors =

Studio album by Phi Life Cypher
- Released: 25 September 2000
- Genre: Hip hop
- Label: Jazz Fudge
- Producer: Skitz and others

Phi Life Cypher chronology
Millennium Metaphors (2000)	The Instrumentals (2000)

Millennium Metaphors is the debut studio album by the Luton-based hip hop group Phi Life Cypher. Its highly political lyrics have been likened to the early work of Public Enemy.

== Critical reception ==
Professional ratings
Review scores
Source	Rating
RapReviews	6.5/10

Tim Perry, in The Independent, wrote that the album got "across the current angst and disillusionment with Blair's Britain like no others" and that it was the "absolute flipside of the Lexus-and-diamonds rappers".

== Track listing ==
1. "Intro" - 1:05
2. "ABC" - 5:25
3. "Rhyme of the Times" - 4:12
4. "BBC" - 3:50
5. "Racists" - 4:26
6. "Drop Bombs" - 2:59
7. "Take Heed" - 3:50
8. "Verbal Wars" - 4:13
9. "Phi Life Phi Life" - 4:39
10. "Last Men Standing" - 3:35
11. "Fatcats" - 4:55
12. "Herbaholics" - 4:52
13. "Phi Life Is Here" - 3:38
14. "Tiks Sappan" - 1:21
15. "Bring It to Ya" - 4:35
16. "Bad Men from the West" - 4:43
17. "Class A Material" - 3:52
18. "Crazy Balheads" - 3:23
19. "Millennium Metaphors" - 4:21
20. "Shining" - 3:45
