= Home Cooking =

1924 film

- Produced by: Samuel V. Grand; Monty Banks
- Starring: Monty Banks
- Distributed by: Grand Asher Distributing
- Release date: February 29, 1924
- Running time: 2 reels
- Country: USA
- Language: Silent..English titles

Home Cooking is a 1924 silent short film directed by Herman C. Raymaker and produced by and starring Monty Banks.

A print survives in the Library of Congress collection.

== Cast ==
- Monty Banks
