= Remedies (The Herbaliser album) =

Studio album by The Herbaliser
- Released: October 1995
- Genre: Jazz, hip hop
- Length: 58:22
- Label: Ninja Tune; ZENCD018

The Herbaliser chronology
| Remedies (1995) | Blow Your Headphones (1997) |

Professional ratings
Review scores
| Source | Rating |
|---|---|
| AllMusic | 3/5 stars |
| The Encyclopedia of Popular Music | 3/5 stars |
| Muzik | 4/5 stars |

Remedies is the debut album by The Herbaliser, released on Ninja Tune in 1995.

== Critical reception ==
Peter Shapiro, in Drum 'n' Bass: The Rough Guide, called it "awash in sticky jazz toffee and narcotic atmospheres."

== Track listing ==
1. "Intro" 2:23 (Note: uses samples of songs by artists: A Tribe Called Quest (1993) Leaders of the New School (1991))
2. "Scratchy Noise" 7:18 (Note: uses samples of songs by artists: Ultramagnetic MC's feat. Godfather Don (1993))
3. "Blomp" 0:46
4. "Styles" 6:25 (Note: uses samples of songs by artists: A Tribe Called Quest (1991) Method Man feat. Carlton Fisk (1994) Showbiz & A.G. (1995))
5. "Interloodle" 1:36
6. "Bust a Nut" 4:31 (Note: uses samples of the musician: Johnny Pate (1973) co-composed with Kaidi Tatha, Malachi Trout)
7. "Herbalize It" 2:10
8. "Real Killer Pt. 2" 5:37 (Note: uses samples of the movies: Dirty Harry (1971) (screenplay by Fink, Fink, Riesner) True Romance (1993) (written by Quentin Tarantino) Zachariah (1971) (written by Austin, Bergman, Massot, Ossman, Proctor))
9. "Forty Winks" 3:06 (Note: co-composed with Malachi Trout)
10. "A Little Groove" 3:46
11. "Repetitive Loop (Re-Loop)" 5:57 (Note: uses samples of songs by artists: Brand Nubian (1990) The Notorious B.I.G. (2008))
12. "Ka Boink!!" 2:01
13. "Wrong Place" (featuring Fabian) 5:24
14. "Da Trax" 1:38 (Note: uses samples of the movie: The Petrified Forest (1936) (screenplay by Charles Kenyon, Delmer Daves) uses samples of the artists: Leaders of the New School (1991))
15. "Up 4 the Get Downs" 5:30 (Note: uses samples of songs by artists: Big L and Lord Finesse featuring: Grand Daddy I.U., Jay-Z, Party Arty (1995) Fab 5 Freddy (1983) Leaders of the New School (1991))
16. "Outro" 0:14

== Personnel ==
- Ollie Teeba - DJ
- Jake Wherry - bass
