= DJ Hero =

2009 video game

- Developers: FreeStyleGames; Exient Entertainment (Wii and PS2)
- Publisher: Activision
- Series: Hero
- Platforms: PlayStation 2, PlayStation 3, Wii, Xbox 360
- Release: NA: October 27, 2009; AU: October 28, 2009; EU: October 29, 2009
- Genre: Rhythm game
- Modes: Single-player, multiplayer

DJ Hero is a 2009 rhythm game developed by FreeStyleGames and published by Activision. It is the first spin-off of the Guitar Hero series. It was released on October 27, 2009, in North America and on October 29, 2009, in Europe. The game is based on turntablism, the act of creating a new musical work from one or more previously recorded songs using record players and sound effect generators, and features 94 remixes of two different songs across numerous genres.

To score points, the player must press buttons to activate accented beats, adjust their crossfade between the two songs, and "scratch" the turntable on the game's custom controller in time to marks that scroll on the screen to score points and perform well for the virtual crowd. The game features both a single player Career mode and cooperative and competitive multiplayer modes. The game also features a mode for selected songs for a DJ player to play alongside another player using a Guitar Hero guitar controller. Many DJ and mix artists have contributed to the game both in the game's development, the creation of mixes, and in lending their images for playable avatars in the game; these including DJ Shadow, Z-Trip, DJ AM, Grandmaster Flash, DJ Jazzy Jeff, and Daft Punk.

DJ Hero was generally well received by game journalists, praising the departure from the Guitar Hero series–style of gameplay, the use of the turntable controller to simulate the motions of a DJ and how the game's difficulty curve helps the player to become skilled on it, and the game's soundtrack; several smaller issues were identified as potential improvements for a possible sequel. However, the game did not perform as strongly as expected by industry analysts, believed to be due to the waning interest in music games during 2009; regardless, DJ Hero is stated by NPD Group to be the highest-grossing new intellectual property of 2009 in North America.

== Gameplay ==
DJ Hero presents the player with three tracks corresponding to the buttons on the turntable controller, along with features to insert beats or to adjust the crossfader. The game features avatars of several popular mix artists, including Daft Punk, shown here.

DJ Hero primarily simulates turntablism, a musical style used by disc jockeys to create a new mashup song by incorporating one or more previously recorded songs played on record players along with sound effect generators. The game features score attack gameplay similar to the Guitar Hero games. The controller consists of a wireless deck consisting of a movable turntable that supports 3 "stream" buttons, an effects dial, a crossfader, and a "Euphoria" button; a hidden panel contains additional controller buttons to interact with the gaming console outside of the game. A portion of the controller can be detached and reattached to adapt the unit for left-handed players. Notes travel in an arc across a spinning record on screen, and the player holds down one of the 3 stream buttons to play notes; two buttons reflect the two songs used in that particular mix, and the third represents samples to add to the mix which can be adjusted with the effects dial. The player must also constantly adjust the crossfader to match onscreen symbols, which alters the relative volume of the songs as to bring one song to the forefront of the mix for a short time. Certain tracks are shown on screen as a series of up or down arrow, representing scratching sections, requiring the player to turn the turntable in the direction of the arrows while holding down the button to score points, mimicking the scratching of the record needle on vinyl albums. "Euphoria" is equivalent to Guitar Hero's Star Power, collected by successfully completing specific phrases in the song mix, called Perfect Regions, and can be released by pressing the Euphoria button, doubling the player's current multiplier as well as automatic crossfading when active. There is also a "Rewind" meter that builds through consistent successful playing, and once full, allows the player to rewind the song to fix errors in their performance. The player must continue to perform well or their performance meter will drop and the music track will cut out. Failing the song is not possible, unlike in Guitar Hero games.

A single player career mode is available, as well both competitive and cooperative multiplayer modes ("DJ vs DJ"), playable locally or remotely. Ten songs have been specially mixed to also support gameplay with Guitar Hero and other compatible guitar controllers in a "DJ vs Guitar" mode, which uses gameplay UI elements from Guitar Hero 5. Players can also use a microphone for a non-scoring addition to the mix. A Party Play mode allows the game to automatically play the songs with the ability for a player to jump in and play at any time.

== Development ==
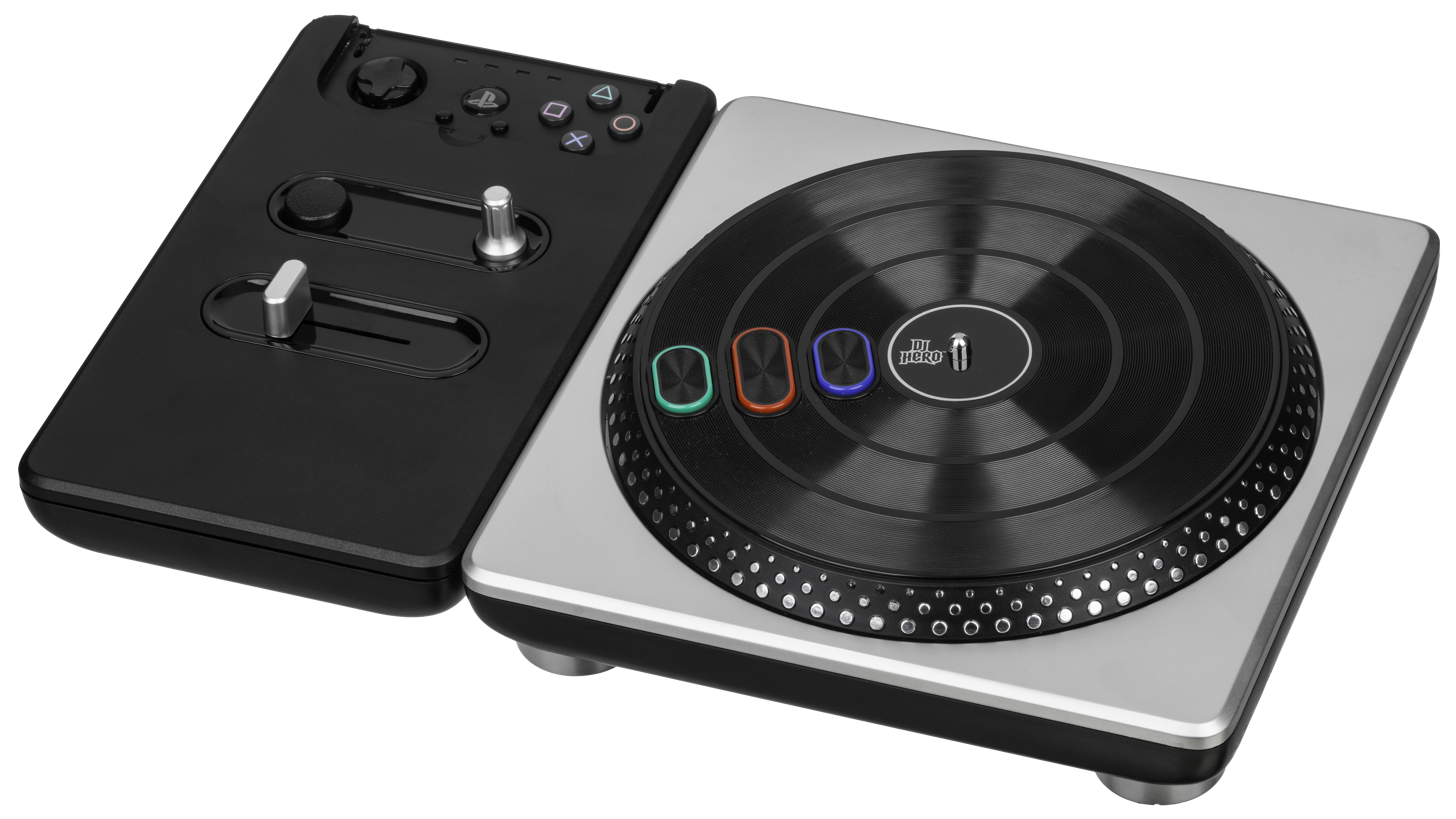
The turntable controller includes a rotatable turntable and three "stream" buttons, a crossfader, effects dial, and Euphoria button.

Activision had initially applied for a trademark on the name DJ Hero in early 2008, leading to speculation that Activision was making plans to compete against Konami's Beatmania series of music video games with their own DJ game as a possible spinoff of their popular Guitar Hero series. FreeStyleGames, a small developer of music games, was employed to help produce localized downloadable content for Guitar Hero games and develop another yet-to-be announced music game. This game was later revealed to be DJ Hero. Activision CEO Bobby Kotick confirmed the existence of DJ Hero in an interview with CNBC on January 20, 2009, revealing a release "later this year". Activision CFO Thomas Tippl stated that DJ Hero would be aimed at a broader audience than the Guitar Hero games primarily through the use of more contemporary music in its soundtrack. Producer Will Townsend stated they opted for a wide variety of music to "make sure that everybody has something in there that they want." DJ Hero was designed as a party game and to make the player "the life of the party", giving ways for them to be "in control of the music", according to Townsend.

FreeStyleGames teamed up with London based music production company Crossfade Cartel owned by Ofei Sakyi and Dan Neil to ensure the overall quality of the soundtrack. The 16 person music production team used a combination of MIDI software along with the music sequencer program, Ableton Live; the MIDI information was used to construct the gameplay elements such as crossfading and scratching with additional custom export software. Because of this nature, Neil stated that it was much easier to alter a mix to meet certain gameplay goals, taking only a few minutes to complete, compared with the development of songs for Guitar Hero.

The team worked alongside artists and DJs for incorporation of songs into the game. Neil stated they brought to artists and DJs working prototypes of the game and hardware to show them what the sampled music and final mixes sounded like, garnering interest from these groups. This led to securing of rights from several groups for their songs, though this did occur late in the development process. Mixing with celebrity DJs was performed either though electronic communications, or at FreeStyleGames' studios or the homes or studios of the DJs themselves; the team outlined the goals of the game and requested mixes that emphasized the gameplay featured, but avoided hampering the creativity of the artists.

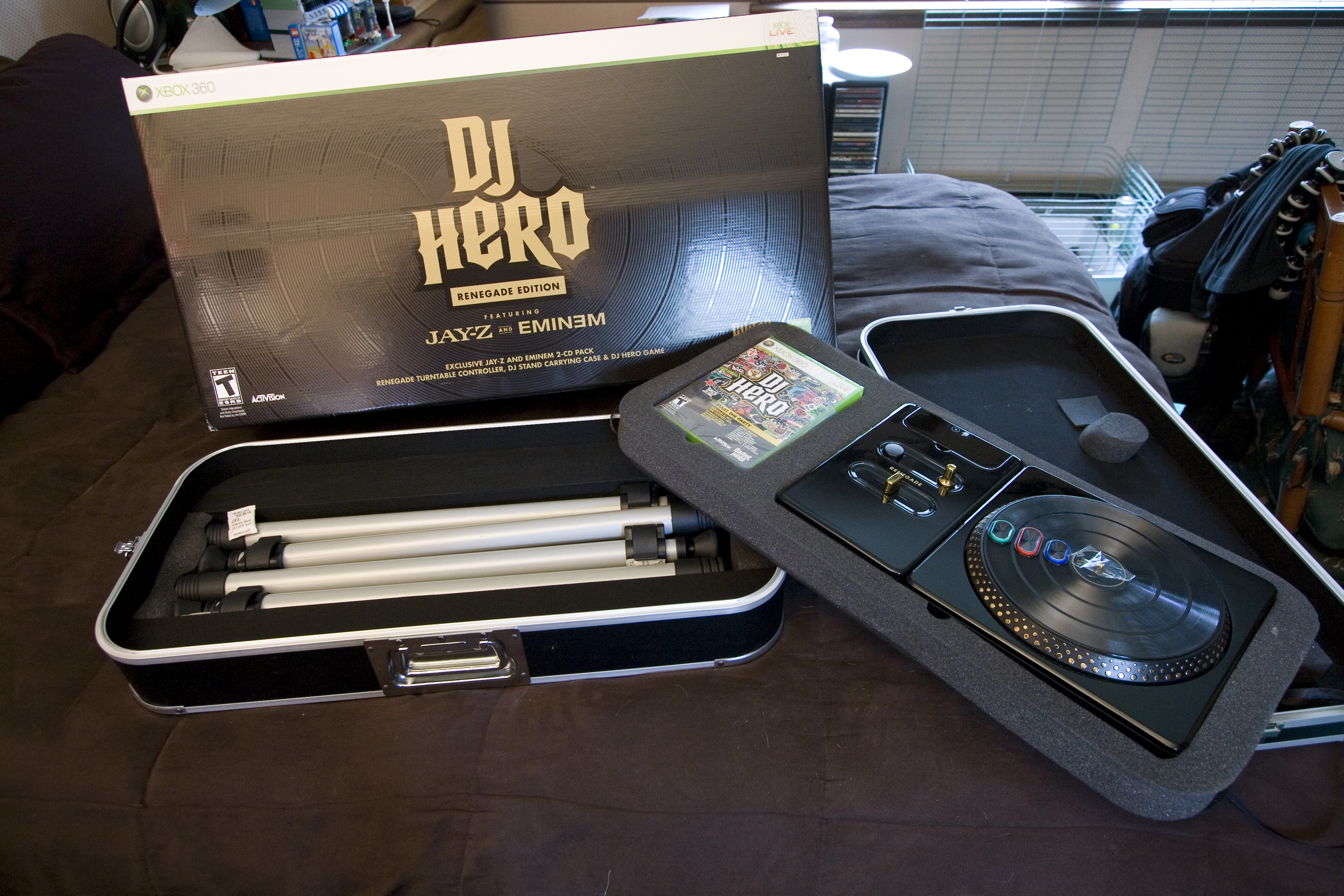
The "Renegade" edition of DJ Hero includes the turntable controller and a case that can be converted into a stand for the controller.

DJ Shadow was brought in by Activision during November and December 2008, at least a year into the development into the game, to help select individual songs, help with creating the mixes, and provide additional input for the game, and will also be a playable DJ avatar in the game. He was able to identify old effects samples that were used in the past for scratching for the developers to include the game. To create the mixes, DJ Shadow first created a "dry version" of each mix which did not include any embellishments. DJ Shadow then proceeded to build off that to create the "wet version" with added effects that was used as the base for the gameplay's mixes. Artists Eminem and Jay-Z have also served as consultants for the game; a special edition of DJ Hero was branded with their names, and included a limited edition of the controller, a music CD of their songs, a DJ stand, and a travel case for the units. This version is titled "Renegade Edition." Jay-Z stated that he "[loved] the freedom" that the game gives him, and was able to work closely with Activision to put in new mixes that he envisioned, and considered the game "a DJ's universe", while Eminem believed DJ Hero was a game that he could "see [himself] actually playing". DJs Z-Trip and DJ AM both created mixes for the game and will also be playable DJs in the game; Z-Trip will also help demonstrate the game at the 2009 E3 Conference. Cut Chemist and J.Period will also be assisting in creating mixes for the game. Grandmaster Flash and DJ Jazzy Jeff have contributed remixes to the soundtrack. All the Daft Punk remixes were created in-house by the team in London. All of these artists appeared as playable avatars. In the case of Daft Punk, a special venue inspired by the group's Alive 2007 tour was created, that Tim Riley, Vice President for Music Affairs at Activision, considered to be "the next best thing to being at a Daft Punk concert". David Guetta has also contributed three mixes that were made available as downloadable content for the game; Guetta would also serve as a spokesperson in the game's European marketing. As part of the game's promotion, the DJ Hero controller appears in the music video for Kid Cudi's "Make Her Say".

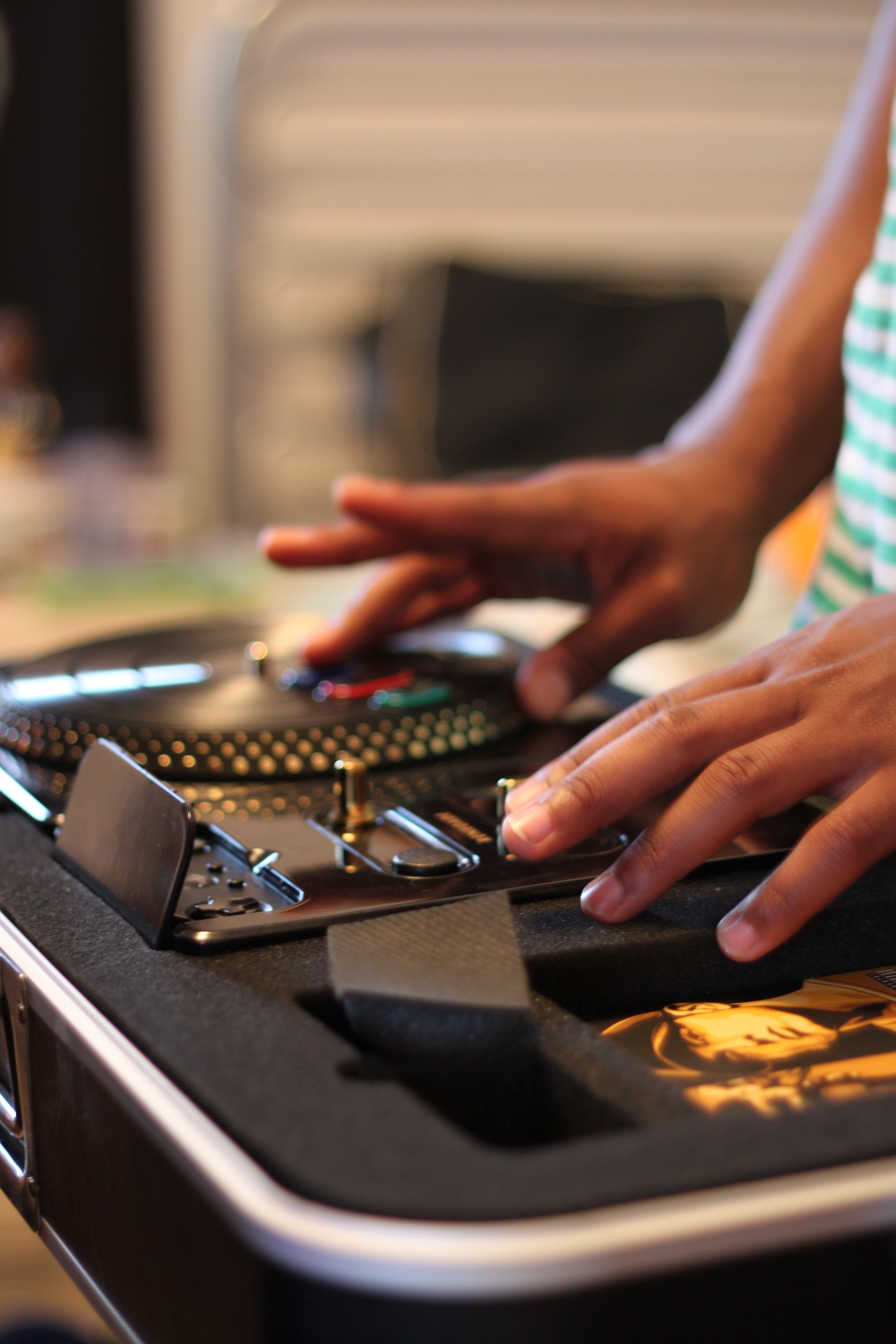
The "Renegade" edition of DJ Hero being played with the controller converted into a table

On August 28, 2009, DJ AM, a significant contributor to DJ Hero, was found dead in his apartment in New York City. His death did not affect the release of the game. Tim Riley, vice president of music affairs for Activision, stated that "We are deeply saddened by the loss of DJ AM. We hope that his work on the game will be a fitting tribute to his creative spirit and musical talent". Also, at least one promotional video for the game has included a screen commemorating the deceased DJ, with the message "DJ AM, 1973–2009. In memory of a visionary."

Neversoft's Brian Bright revealed that the use of Guitar Hero guitar controllers within DJ Hero arose when they tried to create mixes of guitar-heavy and rock tracks in the game; they felt something was missing in these mixes and added in the Guitar Hero-style of play alongside it. Bright has stated that, while too late for the planned release of Guitar Hero 5, they are looking towards future instrument controller interoperability, including use of the DJ Hero controller into gameplay for future Guitar Hero titles, or using drum controllers within DJ Hero.

=== DJ Hero 2 ===
DJ Hero 2 was officially announced in June 2010 and was released in October 2010, featuring more than 70 mashups from over 85 artists. The game includes several new gameplay modes, including an "Empire" career mode, head-to-head DJ battles, social multiplayer modes, and a jump-in and out Party Play mode similar to Guitar Hero 5. The game includes more vocal options for singing and rapping to songs, and a freestyle mode for players. Artists include Eminem, Daft Punk, Chamillionaire, Dr. Dre, Chemical Brothers, Kanye West, Metallica, Lady Gaga, and Rihanna, while Deadmau5, DJ Qbert, David Guetta and Tiësto are playable avatars in the game.

Prior to the game's announcement, Activision revealed a month before the game's release that it is actively seeking artists for downloadable content and a sequel to the game. One DJ in speculation to appear is DJ BJ, including mixer DJ Qbert. David Guetta has stated that he is set to work on the game's sequel to arrive late in 2010. Activision CEO Bobby Kotick stated that despite low sales of DJ Hero, they are committed to continuing the series, with the sequel due in 2010. The sequel, DJ Hero 2, was further confirmed during an Activision investors report for 2009, citing it as one of only 2 major Guitar Hero titles to be expected from Activision in 2010, with an expected late-2010 release date.

=== DJ Hero 3D ===
At Nintendo's E3 press conference on June 15, 2010, the Nintendo 3DS handheld console was revealed. At the conference Nintendo listed a number of publishers and franchises coming to the 3DS, one of whom was Activision with DJ Hero 3D, a new installment in the DJ Hero series and the first handheld DJ Hero title. The gameplay is similar in nature to DJ Hero, where the stylus and touchscreen are used to mimic scratching and crossfading between songs. It was later cancelled due to poor sales of DJ Hero 2.

=== Legal conflicts ===
On April 15, 2009, the publishers of Scratch: The Ultimate DJ, Genius Products and Numark, sued against Scratch's developer, 7 Studios and Activision. The lawsuit contends that Activision purchased 7 Studios to both gain access to proprietary technology and to delay publication of the game so DJ Hero could come out first. The Los Angeles Superior Court in which the suit was filed did not grant the requested restraining order against Activision on DJ Hero. Activision states that Scratch was already delayed by as early as October 2008, before they made contact with 7 Studios, and their acquisition of the developers did not impede them from completing Scratch. However, on April 20, the court reversed its decision, awarding Genius and Numark a temporary restraining order, and ordered the "immediate return" of all of the material from 7 Studios from Activision, including all source code related to Scratch. 7 Studios subsequently filed a counter-suit against Genius Products, claiming that they engaged in "unlawful and unsavoury business practices" that limited 7 Studios from completing the game as planned.

== Soundtrack ==
Over 100 individual songs based on master recordings were licensed by Activision, composed into 93 DJ mixes by both participating internationally known DJs and an in-house remix team. Unusually, the audio team also acted as the design team, playtesting all mixes and creating gameplay in tandem with producing the mixes. All mixes were produced using Ableton Live, with most of the scratch routines being performed by former DMC World DJ Champion DJ Blakey. All mixes used in the soundtrack were unique at the time of the game's release. Celebrity mix artists include DJ Shadow, DJ Z-Trip, DJ AM, and Daft Punk in addition to other mix artists listed below, although Daft Punk did not create their levels - they were all created by the in-house remix team. Initial industry speculation stated that DJ Tiësto would be involved with the game, but this was eventually denied. Mix Master Mike of the Beastie Boys was reported to have signed an exclusivity deal with 7 Studios to appear in their game Scratch: The Ultimate DJ, meaning that he would also not appear on DJ Hero.

The individual songs themselves were pulled from a large number of music genres, including Pop, Grunge, Soul, R&B, Techno, Hip Hop, House, Drum & Bass. Most mashup concepts were conceived by the in-house remix team. In addition to mixes using individual songs from both Eminem and Jay-Z, including Jay-Z's "Izzo (H.O.V.A.)" and "Dirt off Your Shoulder". Eminem also stated that he will have additional songs included later in the year as downloadable content for the game, such as the "Jay-Z vs. Eminem Mix Pack" released in March 2010, featuring three mash up-style songs combining the works of both artists. Universal Music Group is providing much of the content for the game.

== Reception ==
=== Reviews ===
Reception

Aggregate scores
Aggregator	Score
GameRankings	84.89%
Metacritic	84/100

Review scores
Publication	Score
1Up.com	B
Eurogamer	8/10
Game Informer	9/10
GameSpot	8/10
Giant Bomb	4/5
IGN	9/10 (US); 9.3/10 (UK); 7/10 (AU)

DJ Hero has received positive reviews from the gaming press, who consider the title as a fresh restart of the music genre given the large number of titles based on guitar play. The turntable peripheral was considered to be well designed to meet the needs of the game. The unit's weight, size, and shape, and ability to cater to both left- and right-handed players was commended. Many reviewers noted a need to alter the action of the crossfader, either by having better physical feedback to the player to indicate the center of the knob's track, or by reducing the width of the track to better handle the rapid crossfade maneuvers. Reviewers also noted that there was a certain weight to the turntable portion of the controller which made scratching imprecise, particularly with the inner blue button where only minimal torque can be applied. The learning curve of the game across the various mixes was highly commended by reviewers for helping players to get used to the new controller. When progressing from "Medium" to "Hard" and "Expert" levels and encountering more complex mixes, reviewers thought the game felt transformed, bringing a difficult but more rewarding experience to the player as they begin emulating every part of a real DJ's motions. Johnny Minkley of Eurogamer considered that while the learning curve is steep, with the "Easy" difficulty being "less thrilling and engaging" compared to Guitar Hero, the game was "structured fabulously to nudge you gradually closer to the summit" with each successive career set and difficulty mode. Cam Shae of IGN Australia felt that the changes in "Hard" mode over "Medium" were somewhat excessive, introducing both more crossfade effects and button-pressing, and felt these could have been introduced separately in "Hard" and "Expert" modes. Richard Li of 1UP.com noted that the inability to fail a song is both "a bane and a boon"; newer players would not feel frustration at trying to get used to the controller and would be able to quickly unlock all the sets in the game's career mode, but without knowing where they failed, they would not have an idea of where they need to hone their skills to improve their performance at the game. The omission of a practice mode was noted by Daemon Hatfield of IGN, believing it would help in some of the more complex mixes by the DJ celebrities. Reviewers believed that the small faults in DJ Hero can be easily fixed for potential sequels.

Reviewers found the on-disc soundtrack to be generally strong; Hatfield believed that "the entire soundtrack is superb and could easily stand on its own outside the game". Matt Helgeson of Game Informer considered it to be one of the "most adventurous" soundtracks of any music game, and said though it often relied too much on pop hits, it remained true to the spirit of the DJ mix scene. Minkley thought the game to have "vital, varied, surprising and vast musical content" and to be a fresh experience compared to previous music games. Other reviewers felt the soundtrack had some weak areas. Shae noted that many of the mixes felt like "random mash-ups that take disparate songs", which would be appropriate for a live DJ, but does not reflect well on the art of mixing that can be performed today. Li noted a clear distinction in the quality of the mixes between the early sets—those mostly created in-house by FreeStyleGames—and the latter sets centered on the work of famous DJs. While Ben Kuchera of Ars Technica felt the soundtrack was good, he asserted that individual songs were unrecognizable because of modifications made to them for the mixes, and that they were more difficult to adjust to within the gameplay itself.

Many reviews for DJ Hero felt the addition of the non-scoring freeform samples during certain parts of mixes were unnecessary and difficult to use, and with the limited number of samples available, ultimately would lead to overuse and make the mixes sound worse. Reviewers were critical of the game's lackluster multiplayer modes. The DJ-vs-DJ mode was considered poor as both players play the same mix, in consideration of current band-based music games where different players can play different parts of a song. This leads to minimal engagement between players, with each just attempting to maximize their score whenever possible on the controller. While some reviewers considered the DJ-vs-Guitar modes to be fun, others felt it was more a novelty due to the current tracks offered for this mode in the game. The game's graphics were also considered as a negative, often using many strobing lights and creating concerns about possible epileptic seizures that could occur while watching the game. The character designs of the non-celebrity avatars also continued to have the same Muppet-like appearances that occur in the Guitar Hero series, and are overly stereotyped.

Time named DJ Hero one of the ten best video games of 2009, considering it "the new contender for best party game". USA Today considered DJ Hero the best music game of the year. DJ Hero also won Best Soundtrack at the Spike Video Game Awards 2009. During the 13th Annual Interactive Achievement Awards, DJ Hero has been nominated for "Outstanding Achievement in Soundtrack" by the Academy of Interactive Arts & Sciences.

=== Sales ===
Prior to DJ Hero's release, game industry analysts had projected the title would sell 1.6 million units in its first fiscal quarter; however, after disappointing sales performances of Guitar Hero 5 and The Beatles: Rock Band in the month prior to DJ Hero's release, analysis had lowered that expectation to 600,000 units. NPD Group figures for the month of October reported only 123,000 units of the game were sold in the United States, below the 175,000 units projected by analysts. November sales in North America were estimated at 211,000 units. Through January 2010, the game has sold 789,000 units in North America. Ars Technica, in considering the game as a "flop" in its present market due to these numbers, attributes the failure being due to four factors: the game was not suited for social play, the cost was prohibitive in the current market, the mixes in the game were relatively unknown despite the individual songs being well-known, and there was a lack of familiarity with how a turntable works for mixing compared with a guitar or drum kit. However, despite these figures, Activision claims that DJ Hero is the highest-grossing new intellectual property of 2009 in North America based on NPD data, which reporters attribute to the game's higher cost. Activision's Dan Amirch cited total North American sales of over 1.2 million units by June 2010, and commented on the "long tail" of sales that made DJ Hero initially appear to be a failure but instead has been considered a successful title by his company but they ran out of business. They still make money off their games today.

== See also ==
- Beatmania and Beatmania IIDX, DJ simulation games developed by Konami
- Scratch: The Ultimate DJ, a similar game by Bedlam Studios which was ultimately cancelled
