= DJ Skitz =

British DJ and music producer

DJ Skitz or Skitz is a British DJ and music producer. He was born in 1970 in Cambridgeshire and started DJing in 1991. He has compiled a number of British hip hop compilations and other hip hop compilations. Along with Rodney P, he produced the first track to ever be played on BBC Radio 1Xtra in 2002, when the station launched; the BBC called Skitz a "hip-hop star". They also presented a weekly show on the station called "Original Fever", which formed the backbone of the radio station, until 2007. The Independent considered it the "show of the week" on the radio station. In 2008 he competed in the DMC UK DJ Championship. He had also created his own record label, Titan Sounds.

== History ==
In 1996, Skitz released a single "Where My Mind Is At" with Roots Manuva, which launched both of their careers, being noticed in both the hip hop and jazz scenes, as well as by Gilles Peterson and Patrick Forge. The track was sampled by Dallas Austin on Monica's track "Gone be Fine" on her 1998 album, The Boy Is Mine. In 1998, he released a second single, "Fingerprints Of The Gods", which was the only British track to feature in the Hip Hop Connection's top ten tracks of the year and which The Independent called "impressive". Speaking to The Independent at the time, he remarked how the genre was entering a new era and how the quality of British Hip Hop in general was improving. In 2000 he released "Dedication" featuring Rodney P rapping and the DJ, Deckwrecka; the single went on to win the best single at the UK Hip Hop awards in 2000.

=== Countryman ===
Skitz's debum album Countryman, released in 2001 on Ronin Records, is considered "ground breaking" in the British Hip Hop genre. Skitz told Billboard magazine that the album reflected his rural upbringing and that it "helps define the simplistic life most of us strive for". Estelle, who was then unknown, featured in the album on the track "Domestic Science" along with two other female MCs, Wildflower and Tempa. Estelle approached Skitz to create the tune, thinking it would be successful due to the 1990 single, "Ladies First" by Queen Latifah and Monie Love and because nothing similar had been made in the UK since the Cookie Crew in the 1980s. Other artists on the album included Roots Manuva, Rodney P, Skinnyman, Phi-Life Cypher, Taskforce and MC Dynamite and the DJs Tony Vegas and Primecuts from the Scratch Perverts. The Independent said the album provided "evidence of the rude health of the UK's hip-hop scene".

A BBC reviewer wrote that Skitz "delivered a consolidation of talent and attitudes of a musical movement that has been both struggling and hugely underrated for too long" and that it was "perhaps the best illustration of the state of home grown hip-hop today". The beats on the album were described as "a distinctive blend of breakbeat funk, jungle and reggae". Dotmusic.com said that Taskforce's track "The Junkyard" did for Highbury Estate, what Mobb Deep and Nas did for Queensbridge. Roots Manuva's "Inner City Folk" was based around a chorus sung by Valerie Ettiene from the acid jazz group Galliano. In 2004, Stylus Magazine said that Phi-Life Cypher were "the stand out guest act" on the album.

In June 2001, The Face ran a feature, including Skitz, which stated that there was a renaissance in British Hip Hop. In July 2001, the Los Angeles Times reported on how after 15 years of British rappers mimicking their American counterparts, they had recently created their own style. Skitz was introduced in the article as a "prominent British hip-hop DJ" and in it he discussed why British Hip Hop had not been successful before and how it was different from American Hip Hop. Later that year, Countryman was named the best UK Hip Hop album at the UK Hip Hop awards and Estelle was awarded best female Hip Hop artist for her performance on the album. This was at a time that there was an "astonishing increase in the numbers of great UK rap records being released". Interviewed by The Guardian, Rodney Smith, also known as Roots Manuva, said he considers Countryman to be "one of the greatest hip-hop records of all time".

== Album discography ==
- Countryman (2001)
- Badmeaningood Vol.1 (2002)
- Homegrown Volume 1 (2004)
- Homegrown Volume 2 (2005).
- Sticksman (2010)
