= Skalpel =

Polish nu jazz DJ/musician duo

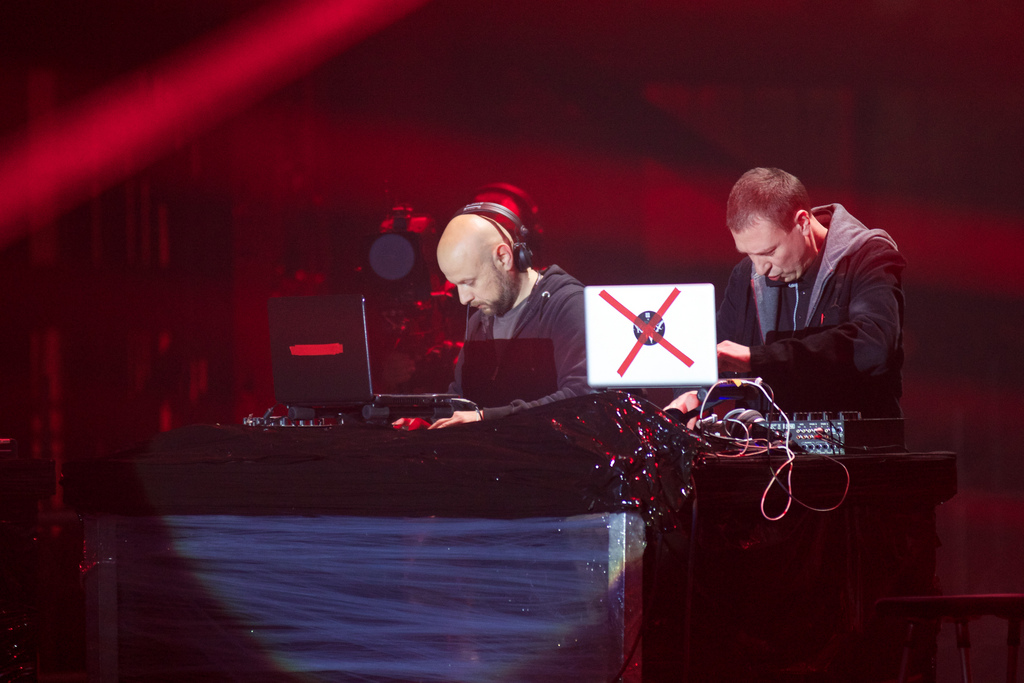

Background information
- Origin: Wrocław, Poland
- Genres: nu jazz, jazz, electronica, downtempo
- Years active: 1998–2006, 2012 (reunion), 2013–present
- Labels: Ninja Tune; NoPaper Records
- Members: Marcin Cichy; Igor Pudlo
- Website: skalpel.net

Skalpel are Polish nu jazz DJs, musicians and record producers, Marcin Cichy and Igor Pudło, from Wrocław, Poland. Their musical style is a distinctive blend of hip hop beats, laced with samples lifted from the rich seam of Polish jazz records of the 1960s and 1970s.

== History ==
In 2000, after interviewing DJ Vadim for a Polish hip hop magazine, Skalpel discussed samples, obscure breaks and the Polish music scene with him. That led to a combined tour with Skalpel and Vadim's live band, The Russian Percussion, during which they performed with four turntables. Later that year, Skalpel released a demo CD entitled Polish Jazz, which gained praise from the Polish music press, and they were subsequently picked up by the UK independent record label, Ninja Tune.

In 2001, they released the Virtual Cuts mixtape, which was composed of two live sessions. Between 2002 and 2004, five of their live DJ mix sets were aired on Ninja Tune's Solid Steel radio show.

Skalpel aim to resurrect the spirit of 60s and 70s Polish jazz, using samples to re-work it.

"The Polish music scene is very poor at the moment. Nothing really interesting happens. The majority of music on TV and radio is kind of 'World Idol'. Very little individuality – just copies of American music."

Skalpel's 2003 EP, Sculpture sold out upon release. It also led to a nomination for the prestigious Polish culture award, the Paszport Polityki.

Skalpel has released two albums. A self-titled album was released in 2004, followed by the double-album "Konfusion" in 2005.

In May 2014, the duo released a new EP, "Simple," and a few months later released "Transit," their first full-length studio album in almost nine years, on their own record label, PlugAudio.

In March 2020, Skalpel released their latest album, Highlight.

== Discography ==
=== Studio albums ===
Title	Album details	Peak chart positions
Title	Album details	POL
Skalpel	Released: May 17, 2004; Label: Ninja Tune/ Isound Labels; Formats: CD, LP, digital download	12
Konfusion	Released: September 26, 2005; Label: Ninja Tune/ Isound Labels; Formats: CD, LP, digital download	17
Transit	Released: October 10, 2014; Label: PlugAudio; Formats: CD, LP, digital download	49
Highlight	Release: March 20, 2020; Label: No Paper Records, K7!; Formats: CD, LP, digital download	13
Origins	Release: April 11, 2022; Label: No Paper Records, K7!; Formats: CD, LP, digital download	

=== Compilation albums ===
Title	Album details	Peak chart positions
Title	Album details	POL
1958 Breaks	Released: April 4, 2005; Label: Ninja Tune/Isound Labels; Formats: CD	25

=== Remix albums ===
Title	Album details
Virtual Cuts	Released: December, 2000; Label: Blend Records; Formats: CS

=== EPs ===
Title	Album details
Polish Jazz EP	Released: 2000; Label: Self-released; Formats: CD
1958	Released: August 27, 2003; Label: Ninja Tune; Formats: CD, LP, digital download
Sculpture	Released: March 24, 2003; Label: Ninja Tune; Formats: CD, LP, digital download
Break Out	Released: February 21, 2005; Label: Ninja Tune; Formats: LP, digital download
Simple	Released: May 2, 2014; Label: PlugAudio; Formats: CD, LP, digital download
