= Phi Life Cypher =

British hip hop group

- Origin: Luton, England
- Genres: Hip hop
- Years active: 1996–2012
- Past members: Life MC; Si Phili; DJ Nappa

Phi Life Cypher were a British hip hop group based in Luton, composed of two MCs, Si Phili and Life MC, and DJ Nappa. The trio started making music together around 1996, and since have had much success on the UK underground circuit. Phi-Life Cypher made it to the final of Tim Westwood's Talent 2000 competition and ripping the mic on DJ Skitz's seminal posse cut 'Fingerprints of the Gods' projected them to the upper realms of the UK hip hop scene.

Phi Life Cypher was featured on an earlier version of "Clint Eastwood" by Gorillaz, however Damon Albarn and Dan the Automator decided to use Del the Funky Homosapien instead. This version was later officially released on G-Sides, a compilation of B-sides which was released in Japan and quickly followed with international releases in early 2002. Phi Life Cypher did however perform the track with Gorillaz at the 2002 Brit Awards, featuring the band in 3D animation, weaving in and out of each other on four large screens along with their rap accompaniment. Phi Life Cypher also collaborated with Gorillaz on "The Sounder" and an unreleased version of "Starshine".

The group has toured with and appeared on tracks by Gorillaz and DJ Vadim.

== Discography ==
=== Albums ===
- Millennium Metaphors (2000, Jazz Fudge)
- The Instrumentals (2000, Jazz Fudge)
- Higher Forces (2003) featuring Skit-Slam
- Playback (2006)

=== EPs and singles ===
- "Baddest Man" (1998, white label)
- "Earth Rulers" (2000, Jazz Fudge)
- "Herbaholics" (2001, Jazz Fudge)
- The Chosen Few EP (with Task Force) (2002, Jazz Fudge)
- "Over" (2003, Zebra Traffic)
- "Rap It Up" (2004, Zebra Traffic)
- "Playback" (2006)

=== Guest appearances ===
- Gorillaz — "Clint Eastwood" (Phi Life Cypher version), "The Sounder", "Starshine (Alternate version)"
- The Herbaliser — "Distinguished Jamaican English" (The Herbaliser remix)
- Skitz — "Fingerprints of the Gods", "Cordless Mics at 20 Paces"
- Mark B. & Blade — "Ya Don't See the Signs" (Phi Life Cypher remix)
- DJ Vadim — "Ghetto Rebels" on USSR... The Art of Listening
