= Jean Grae =

South African-American musician and writer (born 1976)

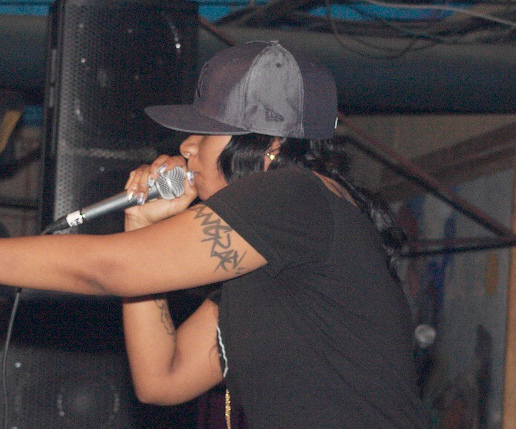
- Grae performing in 2006

Background information
- Also known as: What? What?
- Born: Tsidi Ibrahim; November 26, 1976 (age 49); Cape Town, South Africa
- Origin: New York City, U.S.
- Genres: Hip hop; progressive rap
- Occupation: Musician and writer
- Years active: 1990–present
- Labels: Blacksmith; Warner Bros.; Babygrande; Third Earth
- Formerly of: Crooklyn Dodgers
- Partner: Quelle Chris (2018-present)
- Parents: Sathima Bea Benjamin; Abdullah Ibrahim

Tsidi Ibrahim (born November 26, 1976), known professionally as Jean Grae, is a South African-born American musician and writer. She emerged in New York City's underground hip-hop scene and developed an international following. Throughout her music career, her distinctive style and lyricism gained recognition, with artists such as Talib Kweli, Jay-Z, and Black Thought of 'The Roots' expressing admiration for her work.

== Early life ==
Jean Grae was born Tsidi Ibrahim, in Cape Town, South Africa, on November 26, 1976. The child of South African jazz musicians Sathima Bea Benjamin and Abdullah Ibrahim, Grae was raised in the Hotel Chelsea, Manhattan, where the family moved after her birth. Grae studied vocal performance at Fiorello H. LaGuardia High School, before briefly studying music business at New York University.

== Career ==
=== 1996–1998: Career beginnings ===
Grae joined a hip hop group called Natural Resource along with rapper Ocean and disc jockey James "AGGIE" Barrett. In 1996, they released two 12-inch singles on their label, Makin' Records. They appeared on singles by Pumpkinhead and Bad Seed, as well as on the O.B.S. (Original Blunted Soldiers) double 12-inch single. She produced much of the material released under pseudonym "Run Run Shaw".

=== 1998–2004: Solo career ===
Natural Resource dissolved in 1998, after which Jean changed her stage name from What? What? to Jean Grae, a reference to the X-Men character Jean Grey. Grae released the LP Attack of the Attacking Things on August 6, 2002, and released This Week on September 21, 2004. She has recorded with major hip-hop artists such as Atmosphere, The Roots, Phonte, Mr. Len, Pharoahe Monch, The Herbaliser, Masta Ace and Immortal Technique.

Grae recorded an album with North Carolina producer 9th Wonder, entitled Jeanius; the unfinished recording was leaked online, and work stopped. However, at a release party for 9th Wonder's Dream Merchant Volume 2, Grae stated that Jeanius was still going to be released. It was released on June 24, 2008, on Zune Live Marketplace, then on disc on July 8, 2008. Grae's rapping was described by Robert Christgau as "remarkable for its rapidity, clarity and idiomatic cadence. The writing has a good-humored polysyllabic literacy."

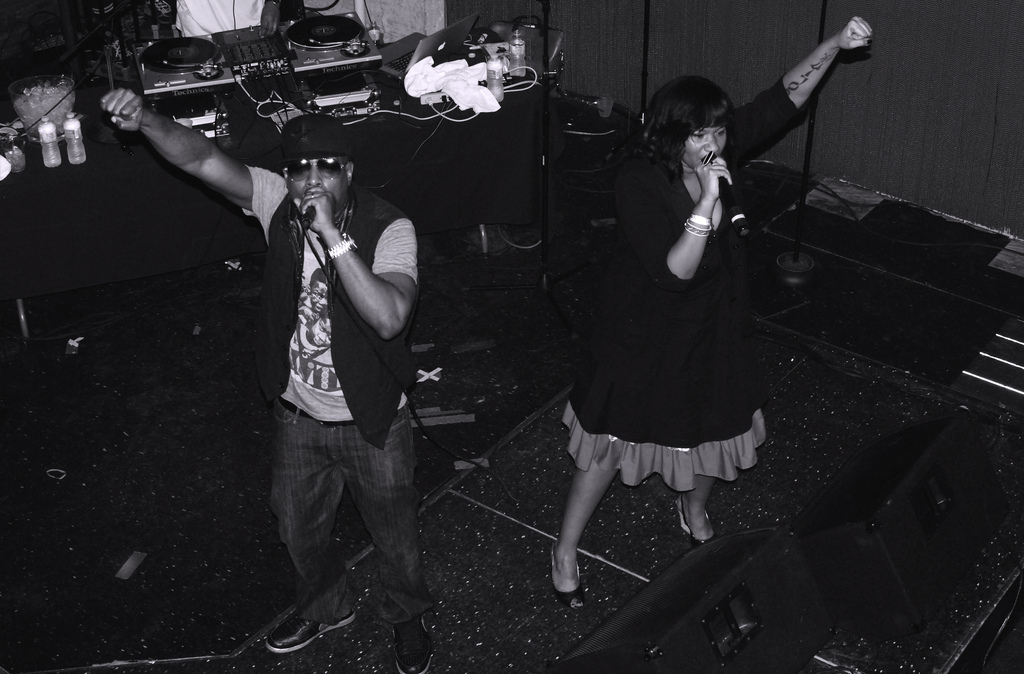
Talib Kweli and Grae in 2010

=== 2008–present: Freelance ===
On a blog, Grae stated: "I don't wanna complain anymore, I just wanna change some things about the way artists are treated and the way you guys are allowed to be involved, since it IS the digital age." Since then, Grae's music has been self-released through the artist's website and Bandcamp.

On June 25, 2011, Grae released a free mixtape entitled Cookies or Comas, which features guest appearances from Styles P, Talib Kweli and Pharoahe Monch; it also includes "Assassins" from Monch's W.A.R. album and "Uh Oh" From Talib Kweli's Gutter Rainbows. This was followed by the 10-track Dust Ruffle on January 2, 2013, featuring unreleased songs from 2004 to 2010. Between October and November 2013, Grae released EPs titled Gotham Down Cycle 1: Love in Infinity (Lo-Fi), Gotham Down Cycle II: Leviathan, Gotham Down Cycle 3: The Artemis Epoch. In December 2013, Grae combined them into Gotham Down Deluxe.

Grae branched out from music, releasing audiobook The State of Eh in January 2014, and writing, directing and starring in the online sitcom Life with Jeanie. In 2013, Grae had a supporting role in indie film Big Words and in 2015 appeared on the And The Crime Ring episode of CBS sitcom 2 Broke Girls. On October 2, 2016, Grae hosted the Golden Probes. On September 9, 2018, Grae and Quelle Chris released their 15 track joint album Everything's Fine, rated by Rolling Stone as the 22nd best Hip Hop Album of 2018.

Grae identifies as gender transcendent and uses she/her pronouns. Grae's rapping style relies on a complex interplay of shifting rhythms and slanted rhymes. An analysis by Matt Daniels for The Pudding indicated that Grae uses a higher-than-average range of vocabulary in her lyrics.

== Discography ==
=== Studio albums ===
- Attack of the Attacking Things (2002)
- This Week (2004)
- Jeanius (with 9th Wonder) (2008)
- Everything's Fine (with Quelle Chris) (2018)

=== Compilation albums ===
- Dust Ruffle (2012)
- Gotham Down Deluxe (2013)

=== EPs ===
- The Bootleg of the Bootleg EP (2003)
- Ho x 3: A Christmas Thingy (2012)
- Gotham Down: Cycle 1: Love In Infinity (Lo-Fi) (2013)
- Gotham Down: Cycle II: Leviathan (2013)
- Gotham Down: Cycle 3: The Artemis Epoch (2013)
- jeannie (2014)
- #5 (2014)
- The State of Eh. A Read Along Album Book Thing. By Jean Grae (2014)
- That's Not How You Do That: An Instructional Album for Adults (2014)
- That's Not How You Do That Either: Yet Another Instructional Album for Adults (2015)
- iSweatergawd (2015)
- Saix (2015)
- Jean Grae's CHRISTMAKWHANNUVUSWALIYEARS (2015)
- MERRYPOCALYPSE (with Quelle Chris) (2016)
- Sevvin (2016)

=== Mixtapes ===
- The Official Bootleg (2003)
- The Grae Files (2004)
- The Grae Mixtape (2004)
- Hurricane Jean The Mixtape (2005)
- Hurricane Jean: The Jeanius Strikes Again (2005)
- Cookies or Comas (2011)

=== Other song appearances ===
- Immortal Technique – "The Illest" (ft. Jean Grae and Pumpkinhead)
- Immortal Technique – "You Never Know" (ft. Jean Grae)
- Akir – "Tropical Fantasy" (ft. Jean Grae)
- The High & Mighty – "Hands On Experience" (ft. What?What?, Kool Keith and Bobbito)
- Tek 9 – "Keep It Hot" (ft. What?What?)
- Tek 9 – "Bruklon" (ft. What?What?)
- Mr. Lif – "Post Mortem"
- Atmosphere – "Insomnia 411" (ft. Roosevelt Franklin and Jean Grae)
- The Herbaliser – "Blow Your Headphones" – "The Blend"
- The Herbaliser – "Blow Your Headphones" – "New + Improved"
- The Herbaliser – "Blow Your Headphones" – Bring It"
- The Herbaliser – "Very Mercenary" – "Mission Improbable"
- The Herbaliser – "Very Mercenary" – "Let It Go"
- The Herbaliser – "Take London" – "Nah' Mean, Nah'm Sayin'"
- The Herbaliser – "Take London" – "Generals"
- The Herbaliser – "Take London" – "Close Your Eyes"
- The Herbaliser – "Take London" – "Twice Around"
- The Herbaliser – "Take London" (second edition's bonus disc) – "More Tea, More Beer"
- The Herbaliser – "Take London" (second edition's bonus disc) – "How To Keep A Girlfriend"
- The Herbaliser – "Same As It Never Was" – "Street Karma (A Cautionary Tale)"
- Masta Ace – "Disposable Arts" – "Hold U" (ft. Jean Grae)
- Masta Ace – "Soda and Soap" (ft. Jean Grae)
- Quelle Chris – "Being You Is Great, I Wish I Could Be You More Often" – "The Prestige" (ft. Jean Grae)
- Talib Kweli – "New York Shit" (ft. Jean Grae)
- Talib Kweli – "Say Something"
- Talib Kweli – "Where You Gonna Run" (ft. Jean Grae)
- Talib Kweli – "Uh Oh" (ft. Jean Grae)
- Talib Kweli – "Black Girl Pain" (ft. Jean Grae)
- Cannibal Ox – "Swing Blades" (ft. Jean Grae)
- Soul Daddy – "No Drank" (ft. Jean Grae)
- Ski Beatz – "Prowler 2" (ft. Jean Grae, Jay Electronica, Joell Ortiz & Mos Def)
- Wale – "Goodbye" (ft. Jean Grae)
- Diverse – "Under the hammer" (ft. Jean Grae)
- Joell Ortiz – "So Wrong" (ft. Talib Kweli, Brother Ali & Jean Grae)
- Lil B – "Base 4 Ya Face" (ft. Jean Grae & Phonte)
- DJ Jazzy Jeff – "Supa Jean" (ft. Jean Grae)
- Pharoahe Monch – "Assassins" (ft. Jean Grae & Royce Da 5'9")
- Sharkey – "Sharkey's Machine" – "Summer in the City (Lovin' It)"
- Rosco P. Coldchain – "It's Our World (Tryin' Times)" (ft. D.P. & Jean Grae)
- Maurice "Mobetta" Brown – "Back At The Ranch" (ft. Jean Grae)
- The Roots – "Somebody's Gotta Do It" (ft. Jean Grae)
- MC Frontalot - "Gold Locks"
- Rapsody - "Blankin Out Remix" (ft. Jean Grae)
- Sammus - "1080p" (feat. Jean Grae)
- Flying Pupa - "Can It"

== Publications ==
- — (2025). In My Remaining Years. New York, NY: Flatiron Books. ISBN 9781250857538. OCLC 1429661996.
