= Never Been Kissed =

1999 film by Raja Gosnell

- Theatrical release poster
- Directed by: Raja Gosnell
- Written by: Abby Kohn; Marc Silverstein
- Produced by: Sandy Isaac; Nancy Juvonen
- Starring: Drew Barrymore; David Arquette; Michael Vartan; Leelee Sobieski; Jeremy Jordan; Molly Shannon; Garry Marshall; John C. Reilly
- Cinematography: Alex Nepomniaschy
- Edited by: Debra Chiate; Marcelo Sansevieri
- Music by: David Newman
- Production companies: Fox 2000 Pictures; Flower Films; Bushwood Pictures; Never Been Kissed Productions
- Distributed by: 20th Century Fox
- Release date: April 9, 1999
- Running time: 107 minutes
- Country: United States
- Language: English
- Budget: $25 million
- Box office: $84.6 million

Never Been Kissed is a 1999 American romantic comedy film directed by Raja Gosnell, and starring Drew Barrymore, Jessica Alba, David Arquette, Michael Vartan, Leelee Sobieski, Jeremy Jordan, Molly Shannon, Garry Marshall, and John C. Reilly.

Shy newspaper reporter Josie Geller enrolls in high school undercover to do research for a story, inadvertently mutually falling for English teacher Sam Coulson.

Never Been Kissed was theatrically released on April 9, 1999, by 20th Century Fox. It received mixed reviews from critics but was a box-office success, grossing $84 million against a budget of $25 million.

== Plot ==
Josie Geller is an insecure 25-year-old copy editor for the Chicago Sun-Times who has never had a real relationship. One day, her editor-in-chief, Rigfort, assigns her to report undercover at a high school to help parents become more aware of their children's lives.

Her first day at South Glen South High School is miserable. Josie reverts to the old geek persona that ruined her first high school experience. She also has an unfortunate run-in with three obnoxious popular girls, Kirsten, Gibby and Kristin, and the school's most attractive and popular student, Guy Perkins. Josie loses hope but is reassured when a kind-hearted nerd named Aldys befriends her. Aldys, who loathes Guy and his gang, invites Josie to join the Denominators, a group of intelligent students.

Josie falls in love with her English teacher, Sam Coulson, and becomes the top student in his class. After reciting a romantic excerpt from Shakespeare to Sam, Josie has horrible flashbacks to when she read a romantic poem aloud in class to her high school crush, a popular boy named Billy Prince, who later asked her to their senior prom, making her dream come true. However, on the night of the prom, Billy arrives with another girl, and both of them hurl eggs and insults at Josie, humiliating her and breaking her heart.

One night while out driving with Aldys, Josie encounters Guy and his gang at a local hangout called "The Court", where promiscuity and underage drinking take place. Her managing editor, Augustus "Gus" Strauss, loses patience with Josie after a rival paper scoops the Court story and orders Josie to become friends with the popular kids. He arranges for her to wear a hidden camera, and soon the whole office becomes obsessed with her story.

Josie confides in her brother Rob about her fears. Rob, who was their high school's most popular boy in his teens, urges her to let go of her old self and start anew. To help her, Rob enrolls as a student and becomes an instant hit. He then uses his influence to draw Josie into the cool crowd, much to the dismay of Aldys.

Sam and Josie grow closer, but Sam struggles with his feelings as he thinks she's a student. Guy and Josie attend the prom as Rosalind and Orlando from Shakespeare's As You Like It. Anita, Gus and Josie's other co-workers watch through the camera and are overjoyed as she is voted prom queen. As Guy dances with Aldys as an alleged act of friendship, the mean girls attempt to dump dog food over Aldys. Outraged, Josie prevents the incident, throws her crown away, and reveals her true identity. She praises Aldys for her kindness and warns the students that one's persona in high school means nothing in the real world. Sam is hurt by her lies and states he wants nothing to do with her. Also angered is Rob, whose identity was revealed by Josie, who as a phony student received a second chance at baseball. Josie, ultimately making amends, secures him a baseball coaching job at the school.

Josie vows to give Gus a story and writes an account of her experience. In it, she admits she's never been kissed, describes the students of South Glen South, and avows her love for Sam; the entire city is moved by it. She writes she will stand in the middle of the baseball field with a countdown and wait for Sam to come and kiss her. Josie waits, but the clock runs out with no sign of Sam. On the verge of giving up, soft cheers from the crowd give way to a booming roar as Sam emerges to give her a romantic kiss. The movie ends with Sam telling her it took him forever to get here, a sentiment with which Josie agrees as they kiss again.

== Cast ==
- Drew Barrymore as Josie Geller
- David Arquette as Rob Geller
- Michael Vartan as Sam Coulson
- Leelee Sobieski as Aldys Martin
- Jeremy Jordan as Guy Perkins
- Molly Shannon as Anita Olefsky
- Garry Marshall as James Rigfort
- John C. Reilly as Augustus "Gus" Strauss
- Marley Shelton as Kristin Davis
- Jessica Alba as Kirsten Liosis
- Jordan Ladd as Gibby Zerefski
- Branden Williams as Tommy
- Sean Whalen as Merkin Burns
- Cress Williams as George
- Gregory Sporleder as Coach Romano
- James Franco as Jason Way
- Cory Hardrict as Packer
- Denny Kirkwood as Billy Prince
- Marissa Jaret Winokur as Sheila
- Maya McLaughlin as Lara
- Giuseppe Andrews as Denominator
- Alex Solowitz as Brett
- Octavia Spencer as Cynthia
- Martha Hackett as Mrs. Knox
- Jenny Bicks as Miss Haskell
- Katie Lansdale as Tracy
- Allen Covert as Roger in Op-Ed
- Sara Downing as Billy's Prom Date
- Carmen Llywelyn as Rob's Girlfriend

== Production ==
The film was inspired by a series of real life investigatory news articles written by Shann Jones (née Nix) on her experience as an undercover senior student in San Francisco's George Washington High School in 1992. At the time, Jones was working for San Francisco Chronicle. She undertook the assignment from the paper to investigate the adverse impact of California's school funding cuts resulted from the state's Proposition 13 property tax reduction.

Jackie Robinson Stadium was the location used for the climactic scene in which Josie waits for her first real kiss from Sam.

== Reception ==
=== Box office ===
The film was released in North America on April 9, 1999, in 2,455 theaters. It grossed $55.5 million in the United States and Canada, and $29.1 million in other markets, for a worldwide total of $84.6 million against a production budget of $25 million.

=== Critical reception ===
Critics gave mixed reviews to the film, with a "Rotten" score of 56% on review aggregation website Rotten Tomatoes based on 91 reviews, making it Gosnell's highest rated film. Its consensus reads, "Drew Barrymore's effervescent charm is almost enough to make you forgive this teen comedy's incredibly silly storyline." Metacritic, which uses a weighted average, assigned the film a score of 60 out of 100, based on 26 critics, indicating "mixed or average" reviews. Audiences polled by CinemaScore gave the film an average grade of "A−" on an A+ to F scale.

Film critic Roger Ebert- notably, at the time, the film reviewer for the real Sun-Times- was not as harsh on the film, giving it three out of four stars and saying, "The movie's screenplay is contrived and not blindingly original, but Barrymore illuminates it with sunniness, and creates a lovable character." He did express amusement at the deliberately inaccurate workplace of the paper presented in the film compared to how he viewed them, notably quipping that the hidden camera technology was not actually available for the paper- "and thank heavens, or my editors would have had to suffer through Baby Geniuses."

The film has since garnered a cult following. For the 20th anniversary of its initial release on April 9, 2019, Barrymore posted the following on social media:

Never Been Kissed was my partner Nancy Fallon and my first official movie at Flower Films. All we wanted to do was make something that felt like the way so many of us feel growing up. It's raw and ridiculous, beautiful and helps you decide what is important and what isn't. But we also loved humor. And if pain isn't mixed with insane laughter, then it doesn't work. Humor and humility are linked like besties! And everyone feels vulnerability while they are figuring out who they are and what they stand for. It also helps when you have the best cast and great music and everyone is making the same story! Josie Grossie forever.

== Soundtrack ==
Never Been Kissed: Music from the Motion Picture

Compilation album by Various
- Released: April 9, 1999
- Genre: Alternative rock
- Length: 53:08
- Label: Capitol

No.	Title	Writer(s)	Producer(s)	Length
1.	"Never You Mind" (Semisonic)	Dan Wilson; Jacob Slichter	Nick Launay	4:09
2.	"Standing By" (Willis)	Tim Seely	Dennis Herring	2:55
3.	"Lucky Denver Mint" (Jimmy Eat World)	Jimmy Eat World	Mark Trombino	3:26
4.	"Problem" (Remy Zero)	Remy Zero	David Bottrill; Remy Zero (co.)	3:30
5.	"Erase/Rewind" (The Cardigans)	Nina Persson; Peter Svensson	Tore Johansson	3:37
6.	"Closer to Myself" (Kendall Payne)	Ron Aniello; Kendall Payne	Ron Aniello	3:23
7.	"At My Most Beautiful" (R.E.M.)	Peter Buck; Michael Stipe; Mike Mills	Pat McCarthy; R.E.M.	3:35
8.	"Catch a Falling Star" (Block)	Paul Vance; Lee Pockriss	Mark Hutchins; Jamie Block	3:34
9.	"Candy in the Sun" (Swirl 360)	Denny Scott; Austin Hanks; Mark Hudson; Steve Greenberg (music producer)	Michael Mangini; Mark Hudson (voc.)	4:17
10.	"Until You Loved Me" (The Moffatts)	Phil Thornalley; David Munday	Glen Ballard	3:27
11.	"Cumbia de los Muertos" (Ozomatli)	Asdrubal Sierra; Chali 2na; Wil Dog; Raúl Pacheco; Ulises Bella; Jose Espinosa; Justin Porée; William Marrufo; Jiro Yamaguchi; Cut Chemist	T-Ray; Ozomatli (co.)	3:34
12.	"Watching the Wheels" (John Lennon and Yoko Ono)	John Lennon	John Lennon; Yoko Ono; Jack Douglas	3:31
13.	"Please Please Please Let Me Get What I Want" (The Smiths)	John Marr; Steven Morrissey	John Porter	1:53
14.	"Innocent Journey" (Sonichrome)	Chris Karn	Rick Neigher; Chris Karn (co.); Neal Avron (co.)	2:40
15.	"Don't Worry Baby" (The Beach Boys)	Brian Wilson; Roger Christian		2:08
16.	"A Girl Named Happiness (Never Been Kissed)" (Jeremy Jordan)	Jeremy Jordan; Chuck Luongo	Glen Ballard	3:29

== Television series ==
The November 6, 2020, episode of The Drew Barrymore Show featured Barrymore in the "Drew's News" segment reprising her role as Josie "Grossie" Geller. Sporting her satin pink prom dress, matching scrunchie and braces, Josie stepped straight out of 1988 for an interview with Barrymore - with no knowledge of anything that's happened since then. Josie subsequently became a recurring sketch comedy part of the series, with Barrymore interviewing the cast of Dear Evan Hansen in-character as Josie.

Barrymore once more portrayed Josie in a segment for the December 13, 2021, episode of The Drew Barrymore Show, when she interviewed Maya Erskine and Anna Konkle, who were themselves, in character as Maya Ishii-Peters and Anna Kone respectively from the TV series PEN15.
