= Ozomatli (album) =

Studio album by Ozomatli
- Released: June 16, 1998
- Recorded: 1997–98
- Studio: NRG Studios (North Hollywood, CA); Music Grinder Studios (Hollywood, CA)
- Genre: Funk; hip-hop; salsa; cumbia; dub; jazz; meringue; reggae; rock; Tejano; worldbeat
- Length: 49:44
- Label: Almo Sounds
- Producer: Ozomatli; T-Ray

Ozomatli chronology
Ozomatli (1998)	Embrace the Chaos (2001)

Singles from Ozomatli
- 1. "Cut Chemist Suite" Released: December 1998; 2. "Super Bowl Sundae" Released: May 10, 1999

Professional ratings
Review scores
Source	Rating
AllMusic	4/5 stars
Robert Christgau	(neither)
NME	7/10
Rolling Stone	4/5 stars

Ozomatli is the debut studio album by the American rock band Ozomatli. It was released on June 16, 1998, through Almo Sounds. The recording sessions took place at NRG Studios and Music Grinder Studios in Los Angeles. The production was handled by T-Ray and Ozomatli.

The album did not reach the Billboard 200, however it peaked at number 7 on Top Latin Albums, number 4 on the Latin Pop Albums and number 25 on the Heatseekers Albums in the United States. Its lead single, "Cut Chemist Suite", was released in late 1998 and peaked at No. 42 on the US Dance Club Songs chart. The follow-up single, "Super Bowl Sundae", was released on May 10, 1999.

== Track listing ==
No.	Title	Writer(s)	Length
1.	"Como Ves"	Jesus "Chuy" Perez	3:57
2.	"Cut Chemist Suite"	Charles Stewart; Willy Abers	4:32
3.	"Cumbia de los Muertos"	Raúl Pacheco; Asdru Sierra; Stewart	3:32
4.	"¿Dónde Se Fueron?"	Pacheco; Sierra	4:18
5.	"Eva"	Pacheco; Ulises Bella; Jose Espinoza	3:09
6.	"O Le Le"	Stewart; Abers; Bella; Carlos Guaico	5:00
7.	"Chango"	Sierra; Justin Porée	4:28
8.	"Super Bowl Sundae"	Sierra; Stewart; Abers	4:45
9.	"Aquí No Será"	Enrique Ramírez	4:19
10.	"Chota"	Pacheco; Sierra; Stewart; Abers; Oskar Cartaya	3:47
11.	"Coming War"	Pacheco; Sierra; Stewart; Abers; Bella	3:55
12.	"La Misma Canción"	Pacheco; Pablo Castorena	4:02
Total length:			49:44

Special bonus tracks recorded live for "2 Meter Sessies" at NPS/VARA Radio, the Netherlands on May 15, 1999
No.	Title	Writer(s)	Length
13.	"Cut Chemist Suite"	Stewart; Abers	6:47
14.	"Como Ves"	Perez	2:58

== Personnel ==
Ozomatli

- Raúl Pacheco – lead vocals, guitar, co-producer
- Asdru Sierra – lead vocals, trumpet, co-producer
- Ulises Bella – vocals, guitar, clarinet, bass clarinet, tenor saxophone, co-producer
- Willy "Wil-Dog" Abers – vocals, bass, co-producer
- Charles "Chali 2na" Stewart – rap vocals, co-producer
- William Marrufo – vocals, drums, co-producer
- Jose Espinoza – alto saxophone, co-producer
- Jiro Yamaguchi – tabla, percussion, co-producer
- Justin "El Niño" Porée – percussion, co-producer
- Lucas "Cut Chemist" MacFadden – turntables, co-producer

Additional musicians

- David Ralicke – trombone, baritone saxophone
- Alfredo Ortiz – timbales (tracks: 1, 5)
- Carlos Guaico – Fender Rhodes electric piano (tracks: 6, 11)
- Tony Lujan – trumpet (track 6)
- Paul Livingstone – 9 string fretless guitar (track 8)
- David Hidalgo – accordion and requinto doble (tracks: 9, 12)
- Tylana Enomoto – violin (track 9)

Technical personnel

- Todd "T-Ray" Ray – producer, mixing
- Anton Pukshansky – engineering, mixing
- Jay Gordon – engineering assistant
- John Ewing Jr. – engineering assistant
- Patrick Shevelin – mixing assistant
- Stephen Marcussen – mastering
- Tony Maxwell – creative direction
- Tom Recchion – art direction, design
- Luis Ramirez – logo
- Brian "B+" Cross – photography
- Andy Olyphant – A&R

Additional personnel

- Andy Mendoza – drums (tracks: 13, 14)
- DJ Kid W.I.K. – turntables (tracks: 13, 14)
- Jan Douwe Kroeske – program producer (tracks: 13, 14)
- Gert De Bruijn – engineering (tracks: 13, 14)

== Charts ==
Chart (1998)	Peak position
US Top Latin Albums (Billboard)	7
US Latin Pop Albums (Billboard)	4
US Heatseekers Albums (Billboard)	25
