= Dos Mundos =

Dos Mundos may refer to:

- Dos Mundos (Rick Trevino album), 1993
- Dos Mundos: Evolución + Tradición, a 2009 album by Alejandro Fernández
- Dos Mundos (newspaper), a bilingual newspaper in Kansas City
