= Los Super Seven =

American supergroup

Los Super Seven is an American supergroup which debuted in 1998. According to Allmusic's Stephen Thomas Erlewine, "Los Super Seven isn't a band, per se – it's a collective, organized by manager Dan Goodman, who comes up with a concept for each of the group's albums and assembles a band to fit." The collective has released three albums to date, with wildly varying personnel. Only Ruben Ramos and Rick Trevino are featured on all three releases.

The group won a Grammy Award for Best Mexican/Mexican-American Album in 1999 for its self-titled album. Their musical style has changed with each incarnation, blending sounds from Tejano, mariachi, Cuban, Afro-Peruvian, Brazilian, blues, rhythm and blues, country, jazz, and rock. The personnel included the members of Texas Tornados, Los Lobos, Calexico, Ozomatli, and others.

== Discography ==
- Los Super Seven (1998)
- Canto (2001)
- Heard It on the X (2005)

== Members ==
=== Members on Los Super Seven ===
- Joe Ely (died 2025) – guitar, vocals
- Freddy Fender – vocals (died 2006)
- David Hidalgo (of Los Lobos) – guitar, vocals
- Flaco Jiménez – accordion, vocals (died 2025)
- Ruben Ramos – vocals
- Cesar Rosas (of Los Lobos) – guitar, vocals
- Rick Treviño – guitar, vocals
- Doug Sahm – vocals (died 1999)
- Max Baca – bajo sexto, vocals
- Joel Guzman – accordion, vocals
- Steve Berlin (of Los Lobos) – Producer
- Rick Clark – Music consultant
- Dan Goodman – Executive producer
- Dave McNair – Engineer/mixer

=== Members on Canto ===
- Wil-Dog Abers (of Ozomatli) – bass
- Susana Baca – vocals
- David Hidalgo (of Los Lobos) – bass, guitar, percussion, arranger, drums, vocals, requinto
- Raul Malo (of the Mavericks) – vocals (died 2025)
- Ruben Ramos – vocals
- Rick Treviño – vocals
- Cesar Rosas (of Los Lobos) – bass, guitar, vocals, guitarron, jarana
- Alberto Salas – piano, arranger
- Caetano Veloso – guitar, vocals
- Conrad Lozano (of Los Lobos) – guitarron
- Louie Perez (of Los Lobos)
- Cougar Estrada – percussion, drums
- Steve Berlin (of Los Lobos) - Producer
- Rick Clark – Music consultant
- Dan Goodman – Executive producer
- Dave McNair – Engineer/mixer

=== Members on Heard It on the X ===
- Clarence "Gatemouth" Brown – guitar, vocals (died 2005)
- Rodney Crowell – vocals
- Joe Ely (died 2025) – vocals
- Freddy Fender – vocals
- John Hiatt – vocals
- Lyle Lovett – vocals
- Raul Malo – vocals (died 2025)
- Ruben Ramos – vocals
- Delbert McClinton – vocals
- Rick Trevino – vocals
- Joey Burns (of Calexico) – nylon-string acoustic guitar, electric bass, upright bass, piano, arranger
- John Convertino (of Calexico) – drums, percussion
- Paul Niehaus (of Calexico) – pedal steel guitar, baritone electric guitar, 6-string bass guitar
- Jacob Valenzuela (of Calexico) – trumpet
- Martin Wenk (of Calexico) – trumpet, vibes, claves
- Volker Zander (of Calexico) – upright bass
- Flaco Jiménez – accordion
- Denny Freeman – electric guitar, piano (died 2021)
- John Contreras – acoustic guitar, vihuela
- Max Baca – bajo sexto, backing vocals
- Adolph Ortiz - guitarron, backing vocals
- Augie Meyers – piano
- Hunt Sales – drums
- Redd Volkaert – electric guitar
- Charlie Sexton – guitars, lap steel guitar, piano, percussion, producer
- Rick Clark, Dan Goodman, Charlie Sexton – Producers
- Dave McNair – Engineer/mixer
- Texas Treefort Studios – Recording complex, Austin TX

== Awards and nominations ==
Year	Organization	Award	Nominee/Work	Result
1999	Grammy Awards	Best Mexican/Mexican-American Album	Los Super Seven	Won
