= Canto (Los Super Seven album) =

Studio album by Los Super Seven
- Released: March 13, 2001
- Genre: Tex-Mex. Latin rock, chicano rock
- Length: 51:40
- Label: Legacy
- Producer: Steve Berlin

Los Super Seven chronology
Los Super Seven (1998)	Canto (2001)	Heard It on the X (2005)

Professional ratings
Aggregate scores
Source	Rating
Metacritic	91/100
Review scores
Source	Rating
Allmusic	4/5 stars

Canto is the second studio album by Latin supergroup Los Super Seven. It was released in March 2001, under Legacy Recordings.

== Track listing ==
No.	Title	Writer(s)	Length
1.	"Siboney"	Ernesto Lecuona	5:20
2.	"Calle Dieceseis"	David Hidalgo, Louie Pérez	2:57
3.	"El Que Siembre Su Maiz"	Rick Trevino	4:25
4.	"El Pescador"	Lorenzo Barcelata, Cesar Rosas	4:30
5.	"Me Voy Pa'L Pueblo"	Raul Malo, Merceditas Valdés	5:25
6.	"Compay Gato"	Ruben Ramos	4:21
7.	"Qualquem Coisa"		3:56
8.	"Teresa"	David Hidalgo, Louie Pérez	5:28
9.	"Drumi Drumi Mobila"	Susana Baca	5:27
10.	"Campesino"	Cesar Rosas	3:15
11.	"Paloma Guaramera"	Rick Trevino	3:02
12.	"Baby"	Caetano Veloso	3:34

== Charts ==
Chart (2001)	Peak position
US Billboard Top Latin Albums	8
US Billboard Latin Pop Albums	6
