= Fire Away (album) =

Studio album by Ozomatli
- Released: April 20, 2010
- Recorded: c. 2008
- Genre: Funk; hip-hop
- Length: 36:31
- Label: Mercer Street; Downtown; V2
- Producer: Tony Berg

Ozomatli chronology
Don't Mess with the Dragon (2007)	Fire Away (2010)	Ozomatli Presents Ozokidz (2012)

Singles from Fire Away
- 1. "Elysian Persuasion" Released: April 2010; 2. "Gay Vatos In Love" Released: May 2010

Fire Away is the fifth studio album by American band Ozomatli. It was released on April 20, 2010, through Downtown Music. Production was handled by Tony Berg. The album peaked at number 189 on the Billboard 200 and number 31 on the Independent Albums chart in the United States.

== Critical reception ==
Professional ratings
Aggregate scores
Source	Rating
Metacritic	64/100
Review scores
Source	Rating
AllMusic	3.5/5 stars
Billboard	4/5
Clash	7/10
Consequence Of Sound	C+
Glide	2.5/5
OC Weekly	C
PopMatters	6/10
Robert Christgau	(choice cut)
Slant	3/5 stars
Spectrum Culture	3.5/5

Fire Away was met with generally favorable reviews from music critics. At Metacritic, which assigns a normalized rating out of 100 to reviews from mainstream publications, the album received an average score of 64, based on nine reviews.

Ayala Ben-Yehuda of Billboard praised the album, stating: "on its fifth studio album, "Fire Away", Ozomatli shows a remarkable ability to innovate with its most expansive and energetic set in years". Ryan Drever of Clash found that the album offers "another rich dose of positive energy and musical diversity". AllMusic's Thom Jurek wrote: "now a septet, Ozomatli are tighter than ever. Berg manages to keep the grit and dirt in the band's live sound while adding just enough studio ambience to make the album jump hard".

In mixed reviews, Crispin Kott of PopMatters resumed: "though it might pain those fans who prefer Ozomatli to be Ozomatli, the album's best tracks are those on which the band finally comes to realize they can be whatever they want to be". Matthew Cole of Slant stated: "while their verses might be disappointingly lightweight this time out, Ozomatli provides more than enough substance where it counts". Uncut reviewer wrote that the album "makes an energetic fist of recapturing in the studio their raucous collision of salsa, hip-hop, funk and R&B".

== Track listing ==
No.	Title	Writer(s)	Length
1.	"Are You Ready?"	Willy "Wil Dog" Abers; Ulises Bella; Raúl Pacheco; Justin "El Niño" Porée; Asdru Sierra; Jiro Yamaguchi	3:17
2.	"45"	Abers; Bella; Pacheco; Porée; Sierra; Yamaguchi; Tony Berg	3:02
3.	"It's Only Paper"	Abers; Bella; Pacheco; Porée; Sierra; Yamaguchi; Berg	2:47
4.	"Elysian Persuasion"	Abers; Bella; Pacheco; Porée; Sierra; Yamaguchi	3:16
5.	"Gay Vatos in Love"	Abers; Bella; Pacheco; Porée; Sierra; Yamaguchi; Berg	3:16
6.	"Yeah, Yeah, Yeah, Yeah"	Shane MacGowan	3:04
7.	"It's Only Time"	Abers; Bella; Pacheco; Porée; Sierra; Yamaguchi	4:14
8.	"Nadas Por Free"	Abers; Bella; Pacheco; Porée; Sierra; Yamaguchi	2:56
9.	"Malagasy Shock"	Abers; Bella; Pacheco; Porée; Sierra; Yamaguchi	2:58
10.	"Love Comes Down"	Abers; Bella; Pacheco; Porée; Sierra; Yamaguchi; Berg	5:29
11.	"Caballito"	Abers; Bella; Pacheco; Porée; Sierra; Yamaguchi; Ilka Cortes	2:12
Total length:			36:31

== Charts ==
Chart (2010)	Peak position
US Billboard 200	189
US Independent Albums (Billboard)	31
