= Street Signs (album) =

Studio album by Ozomatli
- Released: June 22, 2004
- Studio: Glenwood Studios (Burbank, CA); Beatdown Studios; G Digital Recording; Mountain Mouth Studios; Dog Dropping Studios (Los Angeles, CA); The Plant (Sausalito, CA); Music Lane Recordings (Austin, TX)
- Length: 51:40
- Label: Real World; Concord
- Producer: T-Ray; Ozomatli; Chali 2na; Daniel Lewis; Don Corleon; Jason Roberts; J. B. Eckl; KC Porter

Ozomatli chronology
Embrace the Chaos (2001)	Street Signs (2004)	Live at the Fillmore (2005)

Singles from Street Signs
- 1. "Saturday Night" Released: August 18, 2005; 2. "Santiago" Released: October 25, 2005

Professional ratings
Review scores
Source	Rating
AllMusic	3.5/5 stars
Entertainment Weekly	B
Now	4/5
RapReviews	8.5/10
The Guardian	3/5 stars

Street Signs is the third studio album by American rock band Ozomatli. It was released on June 22, 2004, through Real World Records and Concord Records. Recording sessions took place at Glenwood Place Studios in Burbank, Beatdown Studios, G Digital Recording, Mountain Mouth Studios, and Dog Dropping Studios in Los Angeles, with additional recording at The Plant in Sausalito, California and Music Lane Recordings in Austin, Texas. Production was handled by the band themselves, together with T-Ray, Chali 2na, Daniel Lewis, Don Corleon, Jason Roberts, J. B. Eckl and KC Porter.

The album peaked at number 125 on the Billboard 200, number two on the Top Latin Albums, Latin Pop Albums and Heatseekers Albums, and number seven on the Independent Albums chart in the United States.

It won the Grammy Award for Best Latin Rock or Alternative Album at the 47th Annual Grammy Awards, as well as the Latin Grammy Award for Best Alternative Music Album at the 6th Annual Latin Grammy Awards. Street Signs was included in Robert Dimery's 2005 book 1001 Albums You Must Hear Before You Die.

The song "Saturday Night" was featured in the video games Madden NFL 2005, MX vs. ATV Unleashed, and Sleeping Dogs, in the soundtrack to the 2013 film Turbo, and the trailer for the 2010 comedy film Hot Tub Time Machine.

== Track listing ==
No.	Title	Writer(s)	Producer(s)	Length
1.	"Believe"	Ozomatli	T-Ray; Ozomatli	5:02
2.	"Love and Hope"	Ozomatli; Karl Cameron Porter; Jason B. Eckl	T-Ray; Ozomatli	4:24
3.	"Street Signs"	Ozomatli	T-Ray; Ozomatli	3:46
4.	"(Who Discovered) America?"	Ozomatli; Porter; Jason Roberts	T-Ray; K. C. Porter; Jason Roberts; JB Eckl; Ozomatli (co.)	4:35
5.	"Who's to Blame"	Ozomatli; Daniel Lewis; Donovan Bennett	Daniel Lewis; Don Corleon; Chali 2na	3:13
6.	"Te Estoy Buscando"	Ozomatli	T-Ray; Ozomatli	3:50
7.	"Saturday Night"	Ozomatli	T-Ray; Ozomatli	3:59
8.	"Déjame en Paz"	Ozomatli	T-Ray; Ozomatli	3:29
9.	"Santiago"	Ozomatli	T-Ray; Ozomatli	5:10
10.	"Ya Viene el Sol" (The Beatle Bob Remix)	Ozomatli	Ozomatli	3:39
11.	"Doña Isabelle"	Ozomatli; Eddie Palmieri	T-Ray; Ozomatli	1:05
12.	"Nadie Te Tira"	Ozomatli	T-Ray; Ozomatli	4:48
13.	"Cuando Canto"	Ozomatli	T-Ray; Ozomatli	4:40
Total length:				51:40

No.	Title	Length
14.	"Como Me Deule"	3:41
15.	"Believe (Live)"	5:49

== Personnel ==
Ozomatli

- Asdru Sierra – lead vocals, acoustic guitar, piano, trumpet
- Raúl Pacheco – lead vocals, guitar, jarana, tres
- Justin "El Niño" Porée – rap vocals, percussion, re-mixing (track 10)
- Jabulani "Jabu" Smith-Freeman – rap vocals
- Ulises Bella – vocals, keyboards, saxophone, melodica, requinto
- Jiro Yamaguchi – vocals, percussion, tabla, orchestral and percussion arrangement
- Willy "Wil-Dog" Abers – backing vocals, bass, orchestral and percussion arrangement
- Sheffer Bruton – trombone
- Mario Calire – drums
- Rene "DJ Spinobi" Dominguez – turntables

Additional musicians

- Hassan Hakmoun – additional vocals (track 1)
- Paul Livingstone – sitar (track 1)
- Christopher Lennertz – orchestral arrangement (track 1, 2, 9, 13)
- Forte Music City of Prague Orchestra – strings (tracks: 1, 2, 9, 13)
- Les Yeux Noirs – strings (tracks: 1, 2)
- Walter Miranda – piano (tracks: 3, 9)
- Karl Cameron Porter – piano & producer (track 4)
- Jason Roberts – programming & producer (track 4)
- Chali 2na – rap vocals & producer (track 5)
- Cut Chemist – turntables (track 8)
- Greg Porée – acoustic guitar (track 9)
- David Hidalgo – arpa jarocha & requinto (track 9)
- Beatle Bob – introduction (track 10)
- Eddie Palmieri – piano (tracks: 11, 12)

Technical personnel

- Ozomatli – producers, engineering, re-mixing (track 10)
- Todd Ray – producer (tracks: 1–4, 6–9, 11–13)
- Donovan "Don Corleon" Bennett – producer (track 5)
- Daniel "Blaxxx" Lewis – producer (track 5)
- Anton Pukshansky – engineering
- Robert Carranza – engineering
- Seth Presant – additional engineering
- Bob Salcedo – additional engineering
- Kennie Takahashi – additional engineering
- John Hanes – digital audio editor, re-mixing (track 10)
- Serban Ghenea – mixing engineer, re-mixing (track 10)
- Tim Roberts – mixing assistant
- Chris Gehringer – mastering
- John Burk – executive producer, A&R
- Christian Lantry – photography
- Chris Dunn – A&R
- Mary Hogan – A&R
- Bob O'Connor – A&R

== Charts ==
Chart (2004)	Peak position
US Billboard 200	125
US Top Latin Albums (Billboard)	2
US Latin Pop Albums (Billboard)	2
US Independent Albums (Billboard)	7
US Heatseekers Albums (Billboard)	2
