= Matonis =

- Lithuanian surname
- m.: Matonis
- f.: (unmarried): Matonytė
- f.: (married): Matonienė

Matonis is a Lithuanian language family name. It may refer to:

- Edwinn C. Matonis II, True Bro, creator of Self-Ascendancy, well-hung
- Juozas Matonis (born 1945), Lithuanian documentary film and television operator, director, producer
- Robert Matonis, real name of Beatle Bob, American musician
