= Live at the Fillmore (Ozomatli album) =

Live album by Ozomatli
- Released: August 23, 2005
- Label: Concord Records

Ozomatli chronology
Street Signs (2004)	Live at the Fillmore (2005)	Don't Mess with the Dragon (2007)

Professional ratings
Review scores
Source	Rating
AllMusic	3.5/5 stars
Rolling Stone	3/5 stars

Live at the Fillmore is a live album by Ozomatli, released in 2005. The album was released as a CD/DVD, the DVD being the same performance, with extra tracks and special features. It was recorded at The Fillmore, an auditorium in San Francisco.

== Critical reception ==
AllMusic wrote: "Passionate, diverse, fiercely independent, and ardently political, Ozomatli have an ace in the hole: they're one of the best dance bands in recent memory." The Orlando Sentinel wrote that the album "is no substitute for being there, but it hints at how wonderful the band is on stage." The Denver Post called the album "excellent," writing that it "captures the spirit of the show."

== CD Track Listing ==
1. Dos Cosas Ciertas - 3:50
2. Believe - 6:39
3. (Who Discovered) America? - 4:11
4. Eva - 4:59
5. Saturday Night - 4:16
6. Cuando Canto - 5:15
7. Chango - 4:46
8. Love and Hope - 4:57
9. Como Ves - 2:45
10. La Misma Canción - 7:54

== DVD Chapter Listing ==
1. Intro
2. Dos Cosas Ciertas
3. Believe
4. (Who Discovered) America?
5. Street Signs
6. Elevation; Coming Up Part 2
7. Cumbia de los Muertos
8. Saturday Night
9. Cuando Canto
10. Chango
11. Esa Morena
12. Love and Hope
13. Como Ves
14. La Misma Canción
15. Samba

== Personnel ==
Ozomatli

- Wil-Dog Abers – bass, vocals
- Ulises Bella – saxophone, vocals, clarinet
- Sheffer Bruton – trombone
- Mario Calire – drums
- DJ Spinobi – turntables
- Jabu – rap
- Raúl Pacheco – guitar, vocals
- Justin Porée – percussion, rap vocals
- Asdru Sierra – lead vocals, trumpet, keyboard
- Jiro Yamaguchi – percussion, tabla
