= J. B. Eckl =

Canadian musician

JB Eckl /ˈɛkəl/ is a Canadian songwriter, producer, and recording artist. Eckl lives in California.

After doing some guitar session work with Latin pop producer KC Porter, Eckl signed as a staff songwriter for Porter's Insignia Music, a joint venture with Paramount subsidiary Famous Music Publishing. A standout song placement from this period is ‘Right Direction’ on the En Vogue album EV3.

In 1995, he was asked to go on tour playing guitar with the 1970s funk band War. He spent two years touring with them and playing with many influential musicians, most notably Carlos Santana. He later worked with KC Porter again to write and produce two tracks, including ‘Primavera,’ for Santana's 2000 album Supernatural, and another track on its 2002 follow up, Shaman. The Shaman track, 'One of These Days' features Eckl's lead vocal, along with Los Angeles band Ozomatli. Eckl and Ozomatli performed this song on stage with Santana at the Hollywood Bowl at the time of Shaman's release. Eckl also worked with Santana on the song ‘Olympic Festival’ which appeared on the soundtrack for the film Girlfight. Another collaboration with Ozomatli, ‘Who Discovered America?,’ appeared on their 2004 album Street Signs, winning Eckl a Latin Grammy.

He was a featured artist on two tracks from the Out of the Dark album in 2001 by British acid-jazz duo Outside, and the track "Tonight" by Samantha James from her 2010 album Subconscious. A member of the Bahá’í Faith, Eckl has also released several Bahá’í-inspired collaborative albums with Gospel musician Eric Dozier under the Badasht Project. In 2004 he composed the soundtrack for the South African film Cape of Good Hope. He also co-produced a solo album for his former War boss Lonnie Jordan called War Stories, released in 2007 on Concord Records subsidiary Stax, along with fellow band alumnus Pancho Tomaselli.

Eckl co-wrote ‘Flying Home (Sully’s Theme)’ with Clint Eastwood and jazz vocalist Tierney Sutton for the Eastwood-directed film Sully in 2016. He was hired in 2017 by Meta Platforms to develop a global music library called the Meta Sound Collection.

Eckl has a music YouTube page with 15,000 subscribers, and is currently creating a video series called ‘Sacred Riffs’ for actor Rainn Wilson’s Soul Boom social media channels.

== Interviews ==
- Eckl, JB (2019-01-28). "Episode 33: JB Eckl". Baha’i Blogcast with Rainn Wilson (Interview). Interviewed by Rainn Wilson. Baha'i Blog.
- Eckl, JB (2014-03-16). "Visionaries: An Interview with JB Eckl of Badasht" (Interview). Interviewed by Naysan Naraqi. Baha'i Blog.
- Eckl, JB (2018-09-02). "S2 EP2 – Guitarist JB Eckl" (Interview). Interviewed by The Helix Hour. Music Gear Network. Archived from the original on 2021-12-21.
- Eckl, JB (2015-07-08). ""A Night of Oneness" at the House of Blues Features Great Music for an Excellent Cause" (Interview). Interviewed by Ed Simon. The Los Angeles Beat.
