= Los Super Seven (album) =

Studio album by Los Super Seven
- Released: September 15, 1998
- Genre: Tex-Mex, Chicano rock, Latin rock
- Length: 41:25
- Label: RCA Nashville
- Producer: Steve Berlin

Los Super Seven chronology
Los Super Seven (1998)	Canto (2001)

Los Super Seven is a studio album released by supergroup Los Super Seven. It was released in September 15, 1998, by RCA Nashville. Freddy Fender and Flaco Jiménez, both from Texas Tornados, formed Los Super Seven, with Joe Ely, Rick Trevino, David Hidalgo and Cesar Rosas (of Los Lobos fame), and Tejano vocalist Ruben Ramos. The album peaked at number one in the Billboard Regional Mexican Albums chart and reached top ten in the Billboard Top Latin Song chart. Los Super Seven earned them the Grammy Award for Best Mexican-American Performance at the 41st Grammy Awards. A portion of the proceeds of the album was donated to the National Council of La Raza, a non-profit organization that represents Latino interests and causes.

== Track listing ==
1. El Canoero (The Canoeist) – 3:19
2. Piensa en Mí (Think of Me) – 3:53
3. Mi Ranchito (My Ranch) – 3:51
4. Un Beso al Viento (A Kiss to the Wind) – 2:31
5. La Sirena (The Mermaid) – 2:53
6. Un Lunes por la Mañana (Early on a Monday Morning) – 3:18
7. Deportee (Plane Wreck at Los Gatos) – 3:38
8. La Morena – 2:55
9. Margarita – 3:25
10. La Madrugada (The Dawn) – 2:40
11. El Ausente (The Absentee) – 3:39
12. Río de Tenampa – 4:23
13. Las Norteñitas – 1:00

== Chart performance ==
Chart (1998)	Peak position
US Billboard Top Latin Albums	8
US Billboard Regional Mexican Albums	1
