= Embrace the Chaos =

Studio album by Ozomatli
- Released: September 11, 2001
- Genre: Alternative hip hop; latin jazz
- Length: 45:05
- Label: Interscope
- Producer: Bob Power; Mario Caldato Jr.; Ozomatli; Steve Berlin

Ozomatli chronology
Ozomatli (1998)	Embrace the Chaos (2001)	Street Signs (2004)

Singles from Embrace the Chaos
- 1. "Vocal Artillery" Released: October 22, 2002

Professional ratings
Review scores
Source	Rating
AllMusic	4/5 stars
Spin	8/10
The Village Voice	(2-star Honorable Mention)

Embrace the Chaos is the second studio album by the American rock band Ozomatli. It was released on September 11, 2001 via Interscope Records. Production was handled by Bob Power, Steve Berlin, Mario C. and Ozomatli. The album peaked at number 138 on the Billboard 200, number two on the Heatseekers Albums, and topped both the Top Latin Albums and Latin Pop Albums charts in the United States. It won the Grammy Award for Best Latin Rock/Alternative Album at the 44th Annual Grammy Awards.

== Track listing ==
No.	Title	Writer(s)	Producer(s)	Length
1.	"Pá Lante"	Ozomatli	Steve Berlin; Ozomatli (co.)	5:03
2.	"1234"	Ozomatli; José Espinosa; David Jolicoeur; Kelvin Mercer	Bob Power	3:07
3.	"Dos Cosas Ciertas"	Ozomatli; Espinosa; Andy Mendoza; Anthony Stout	Mario Caldato Jr.	3:28
4.	"Vocal Artillery"	Ozomatli; Espinosa; Stout; Mone Smith; William James Adams	Bob Power	4:59
5.	"Guerrillero"	Ozomatli; Espinosa; Mendoza; David Hidalgo; Louie Pérez	Bob Power	4:29
6.	"Embrace the Chaos"	Ozomatli; Espinosa; Lonnie Rashid Lynn	Bob Power	4:18
7.	"Pensativo (Interlude)"	Asdru Sierra	Steve Berlin; Ozomatli (co.)	2:33
8.	"Timido"	Ozomatli; Espinosa; Mendoza	Steve Berlin; Ozomatli (co.)	5:18
9.	"Lo Que Dice"	Ozomatli; Espinosa; Mendoza	Bob Power	3:20
10.	"Mi Alma"	Ozomatli; Espinosa; Mendoza	Steve Berlin	5:09
11.	"Sueños en Realidad"	Ozomatli; Espinosa; Mendoza	Mario Caldato Jr.	3:21
Total length:				45:05

== Personnel ==
Ozomatli

- Willy "Wil-Dog" Abers – electric bass, guitar, Ampeg Baby Bass, vocals
- Ulises Bella – bass clarinet, guitar, piano, saxophone (baritone and tenor), vocals
- Raúl Pacheco – guitar, jarana, tres, vocals
- Justin Porée – percussion, rap, vocals
- Kanetic Source - (rap vocals)
- Asdru Sierra – trumpet, vocals
- Jiro Yamaguchi – percussion, tabla, vocals
- Andy Mendoza – drums

Additional musicians

- Common - rap on "Embrace the Chaos"
- Cut Chemist – turntables
- De La Soul – rap on "1234"
- David Hidalgo – violin
- Harry Kim – trumpet
- Prince Diabaté – kora
- Walter Miranda – piano
- Bob Power – slide guitar, Fender Rhodes
- Alberto Salas – piano
- Arturo Velasco – trombone

Technical personnel

- Steve Berlin – producing
- Ryan Boesch – assistant engineer
- Kevin Breen – assistant engineer
- Robert Breen – assistant engineer
- Mario Caldato Jr. – producing, mixing
- Robert Carranza – engineer, mixing
- Tom Coyne – mastering
- Kevin Dean – assistant engineer
- Dave McNair – engineer, mixing
- Sean Murphy – photography
- Ozomatli – producing
- Justin Porée – drum programming
- Bob Power – producer, engineer, mixing
- Francesca Restrepo – Art direction, design
- Alberto Salas – arranger
- Peter Young – photography, cover photo

== Charts ==
Chart (2001)	Peak position
US Billboard 200	138
US Top Latin Albums (Billboard)	1
US Latin Pop Albums (Billboard)	1
US Heatseekers Albums (Billboard)	2
