= Honky Tonk Crowd (Marty Stuart song) =

Single by Rick Trevino

from the album Rick Trevino
- B-side: "Un Momento Allá"
- Released: February 8, 1994
- Genre: Country
- Length: 2:47
- Label: Columbia 77535
- Songwriter: Marty Stuart
- Producer: Steve Buckingham

Rick Trevino singles chronology
"Just Enough Rope" (1993)	"Honky Tonk Crowd" (1994)	"She Can't Say I Didn't Cry" (1994)

"Honky Tonk Crowd" is a song written by Marty Stuart and found on his album This One's Gonna Hurt You.

It was later recorded by Rick Trevino, who released it in February 1994 as the second single from his eponymous debut album in 1994 (see infobox). It reached number 35 on the Billboard Hot Country Songs chart and number 29 on the Canadian RPM country Tracks chart in mid-1994.

== Critical reception ==
Larry Flick, of Billboard magazine gave a mixed review of the song, calling it a "competently performed dancefloor anthem. No more, no less."

== Music video ==
The music video was directed by Gerry Wenner and premiered in January 1994.

== Chart performance ==
"Honky Tonk Crowd" debuted at number 68 on the U.S. Billboard Hot Country Singles & Tracks for the week of February 12, 1994.

Chart (1994)	Peak position
Canada Country Singles (RPM)	29
US Hot Country Songs (Billboard)	35
