= Rick Trevino =

American singer

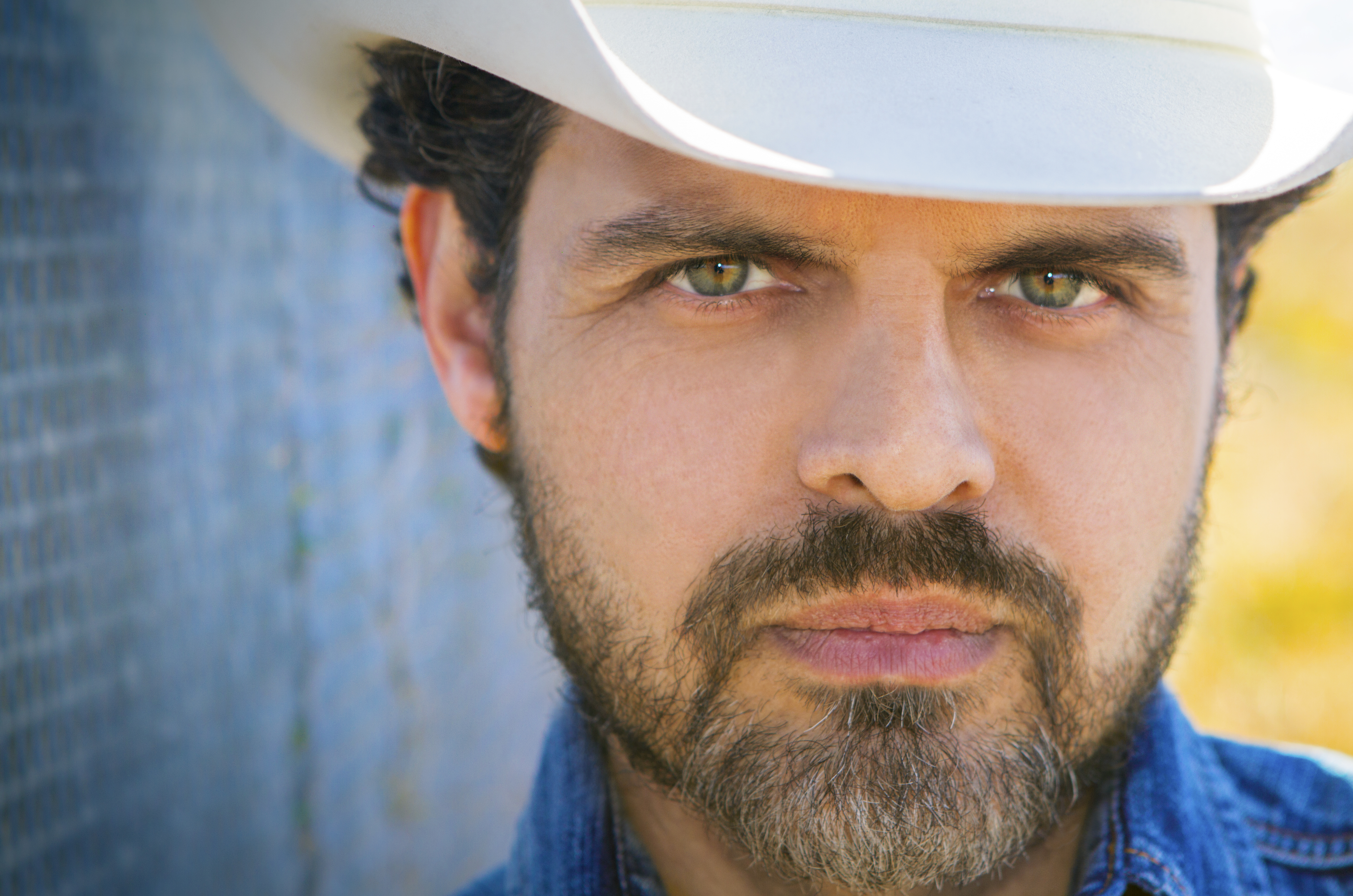
- Trevino in 2016.

Background information
- Also known as: Rick Treviño
- Born: Ricardo Treviño Jr. May 16, 1971 (age 55); Austin, Texas, U.S.
- Genres: Country
- Occupations: Singer, songwriter
- Instruments: Vocals; guitar; piano
- Years active: 1993–present
- Labels: Columbia Nashville; Vanguard; Warner Nashville
- Formerly of: Los Super Seven
- Website: Official website

Ricardo Treviño Jr. (born May 16, 1971), known professionally as Rick Trevino, is an American country music artist. Signed to Columbia Nashville in 1993, Trevino began his career that year with the release of his debut single "Just Enough Rope", the first mainstream country music single to feature separate English and Spanish versions. The song was included on his debut album Dos Mundos; a self-titled album followed a year later. Trevino has charted a total of fourteen singles on the Billboard Hot Country Songs chart and recorded seven studio albums. His highest-charting single, "Running Out of Reasons to Run", reached No. 1 on that chart in 1996.

== Biography ==
=== Early years ===
Ricardo Treviño Jr. was born May 16, 1971, in Houston, Texas. He is the son of Ricardo Treviño Sr., a Tejano musician, and Linda Chavez. His music career began when he started taking piano lessons at the age of five. He plays rhythm guitar as well as keyboards.

Trevino graduated from Westwood High School in Austin, Texas. Although he was offered a baseball scholarship to Memphis State University, Trevino chose instead to study music at Texas A&M University. While a student, Trevino played in a rock band and then a George Strait-influenced country band called Bandera. In December 1991, a representative of the Sony label, Paul Jarosik, was stranded in Austin due to flooding conditions and visited a small club where Trevino regularly played. Although Trevino was not performing that evening, the representative saw several articles on the walls which praised Trevino. Employees of the club gave him a tape of Trevino's music, which the label representative then passed onto music producer Steve Buckingham. Buckingham made a special trip to Austin just to hear Trevino perform and signed him to Sony. Trevino left school to pursue his music career.

=== 1993: Dos Mundos ===
At the insistence of Columbia Nashville, his first album, Dos Mundos, was an almost entirely Spanish country album. Trevino, who is not a native Spanish speaker and needed lessons before he could record the album, was displeased with the decision. "I didn't like that a bit because I didn't want people to think I was a Tejano artist...Everybody thinks I'm a Tejano singer crossing over to the country format." The album was certified gold (selling over 500,000 copies).

=== 1993–1995: Rick Trevino ===
Seven months later, in 1994, Sony released his first English album, Rick Trevino. Rick Trevino was certified gold (selling over 500,000 copies) and featured the hits "She Can't Say I Didn't Cry" and "Doctor Time." He released his debut single, "Just Enough Rope" ("Bastante Cordón") on September 7, 1993. It appeared in English on Rick Trevino and in Spanish on Dos Mundos, while a version of the song which combined the two languages was also released to radio. This became the first mainstream country single to be released in both English and Spanish. The album's third single, "She Can't Say I Didn't Cry", became Trevino's first chart-topper, spending one week at the top of the Gavin Report country singles charts.

The following year in 1995, Trevino was shortlisted for the Academy of Country Music Award for Top New Male Vocalist.

=== 1995–1996: Looking for the Light ===
The follow-up English album, Looking for the Light, was released in 1995 and included the top-ten hit "Bobbie Ann Mason." Trevino also recorded a Spanish version of the album, titled Un Rayo de Luz ("A Ray of Light").

In the late 1990s he joined an all-star group of Mexican-American singers, including members of Los Lobos, Freddy Fender, Ruben Ramos, and Flaco Jimenez, to create the supergoup Los Super Seven. The group won a Grammy in 1998 for Best Mexican-American Music Performance for their self-titled debut album. Another two albums followed – Canto in 2001 (also released live on DVD) and Heard It On The X in 2005 (both albums included Raul Malo of The Mavericks among others).

=== 1996–1997: Learning as You Go ===
Trevino's 1996 album Learning as You Go, produced his first and only Billboard Number One single in "Running Out of Reasons to Run" with "Learning As You Go" reaching #1 on the Radio & Records Chart and #2 on the Billboard Country Chart. The third single, "I Only Get This Way With You" reached #7 on the Billboard Country Chart. As with Looking for the Light, Learning As You Go also featured a separate Spanish-language version, titled Mi Vida Eres Tú ("My Life Is You").

=== 1998: Departure from Sony ===
Trevino asked to leave his contract with Sony in the hopes of moving in a different musical direction. Sony refused to release him from the contract, and Trevino cut a new album and released the single "Only Lonely Me" on August 18, 1998. Before the album could be released, Sony agreed to release Trevino, and the album was shelved. The same year Trevino appeared on compilation CD Tribute To Tradition (released on Columbia label) with a cover version of "City Lights" (#1 country classic recorded by Ray Price in 1958).

=== 1999–2002: Continued touring and Mi Son ===
Trevino continued to tour and released a Spanish-language album, Mi Son, that contained only ballads and had little hint of his country music roots. Without a new album or record deal, however, Trevino's touring schedule slowed, and most of his band quit.

During this time, Trevino began collaborating with Raul Malo, former frontman of country band The Mavericks. The two had met while working on the second Los Super Seven album. Their collaborations helped bring Trevino to the attention of producer Paul Worley, who helped Trevino get a contract with Warner Brothers.

=== 2002–2004: In My Dreams ===
For his next album, In My Dreams, Trevino "wanted to do a country record that had a Latin flavor to it." He wrote or cowrote every song on the album except for the final track, a cover of the Bryan Adams song "Have You Ever Really Loved a Woman?" The title track, "In My Dreams" became a single and remained on the charts for twenty weeks, falling just shy of the Top 40 on the Billboard country charts. Trevino was disappointed with the final ranking, but said the album "opened a lot of doors for me. It made people take me a little more seriously than 'Bobbie Ann Mason.'"

=== 2004–present: Single releases and Whole Town Blue ===
Trevino's Warner Records single release, Separate Ways, failed to reach the Top 40 on Billboard's Hot Country Songs chart and the planned release of the Whole Town Blue album was cancelled. The album was subsequently released in 2011 on one CD with his previous album on the Warner label as In My Dreams / Whole Town Blue. A Christmas album titled Oh Ven, Emanuel was self-released in 2009 and was still available through his website as of 2016. His collaboration with Los Lobos on "Wasted Days and Wasted Nights" was released as a single in 2010.

== Discography ==
=== Studio albums ===
Title	Album details	Peak chart positions			Certifications (sales thresholds)
Title	Album details	US Country	US	US Latin	Certifications (sales thresholds)
Dos Mundos^{[A]}	Release date: September 14, 1993; Label: Columbia Records	—	—	20	
Rick Trevino^{[B]}	Release date: February 22, 1994; Label: Columbia Records	23	119	—	US: Gold
Looking for the Light	Release date: February 7, 1995; Label: Columbia Records	17	121	22	
Learning as You Go	Release date: June 25, 1996; Label: Columbia Records	17	117	—	
Mi Son^{[A]}	Release date: January 23, 2001; Label: Vanguard Records	—	—	—	
In My Dreams	Release date: September 9, 2003; Label: Warner Records	58	—	—	
Oh Ven, Emanuel	Release date: 2009; Label: Self-released	—	—	—	
Whole Town Blue	Release date: March 7, 2011; Label: Warner Records	—	—	—	
"—" denotes releases that did not chart

=== Compilation albums ===
Title	Album details
Best of Rick Trevino	Release date: August 5, 1997; Label: Sony International
Corazón de Rick Trevino^{[A]}	Release date: January 12, 1999; Label: Sony International
Super Hits	Release date: September 14, 1999; Label: Sony Special Products
Mano a Mano^{[A]}	Release date: February 20, 2001; Label: Sony International
Nuestra Tradición^{[A]}	Release date: July 24, 2007; Label: Norte

Notes

- A Spanish-language albums.
- B Rick Trevino also charted at number 5 on the US Top Heatseekers chart.

=== Singles ===
Year	Single	Peak chart positions		Album
Year	Single	US Country	CAN Country	Album
1993	"Un Momento Allá"	—	—	Dos Mundos
1993	"Just Enough Rope" ("Bastante Cordón")	44	71	Rick Trevino
1994	"Honky Tonk Crowd"	35	29	Rick Trevino
1994	"She Can't Say I Didn't Cry"	3	11	Rick Trevino
1994	"Doctor Time"	5	3	Rick Trevino
1995	"Looking for the Light"	43	30	Looking for the Light
1995	"Bobbie Ann Mason"	6	6	Looking for the Light
1995	"Save This One for Me"	45	—	Looking for the Light
1996	"Learning as You Go"	2	36	Learning as You Go
1996	"Running Out of Reasons to Run"	1	16	Learning as You Go
1997	"I Only Get This Way with You"	7	26	Learning as You Go
1997	"See Rock City"	44	54	Learning as You Go
1998	"Only Lonely Me"	52	94	—N/a
2003	"In My Dreams"	41	—	In My Dreams
2003	"Overnight Success"	—	—	In My Dreams
2007	"Separate Ways"	59	—	Whole Town Blue
2010	"Wasted Days and Wasted Nights" (with Los Lobos)	—	—	—N/a
2010	"Better in Texas"	—	—	Whole Town Blue
2016	"Cowboys Like Me"	—	—	—N/a
2018	"I Am a Mexican" (feat. Flaco Jimenez)	—	—	—N/a
2020	"Cinco De Mayo"	—	—	—N/a
2024	"The Ride"	—	—	—
"—" denotes releases that did not chart

=== Music videos ===
Year	Video	Director
1993	"Just Enough Rope"	Greg Aldridge/Marc Ball
1994	"Honky Tonk Crowd"	Gerry Wenner
1994	"She Can't Say I Didn't Cry"	Gerry Wenner
1994	"Doctor Time"	Gerry Wenner
1995	"Looking For the Light"	Martin Kahan
1995	"Bobbie Ann Mason"	Martin Kahan
1995	"Save This One for Me"	Martin Kahan
1996	"Learning as You Go"	Jon Small
1996	"Running Out of Reasons to Run"	Martin Kahan
2003	"In My Dreams"	Peter Zavadil
2007	"Separate Ways"	Peter Zavadil
2018	"I Am A Mexican"	
2024	"The Ride"	Gilbert “Gibby” Villaseñor

== Awards and nominations ==
=== Grammy Awards ===
Year	Nominee / work	Award	Result
1998	Los Super Seven (with Los Super Seven)	Best Mexican/Mexican-American Album	Won

=== Academy of Country Music Awards ===
Year	Nominee / work	Award	Result
1995	Rick Trevino	Top New Male Vocalist	Shortlisted
