= Rick Trevino (album) =

Studio album by Rick Trevino
- Released: February 22, 1994
- Recorded: 1993
- Studio: The Doghouse; Nightingale Studio; Sound Emporium (Nashville, Tennessee)
- Genre: Country
- Length: 34:30
- Label: Columbia Nashville
- Producer: Steve Buckingham

Rick Trevino chronology
Dos Mundos (1993)	Rick Trevino (1994)	Looking for the Light (1995)

Singles from Rick Trevino
- 1. "Just Enough Rope" Released: September 7, 1993; 2. "Honky Tonk Crowd" Released: February 8, 1994; 3. "She Can't Say I Didn't Cry" Released: May 31, 1994; 4. "Doctor Time" Released: October 4, 1994

Professional ratings
Review scores
Source	Rating
AllMusic	4/5 stars

Rick Trevino is the second studio album by the Hispanic-American country music singer of the same name. His second major-label album, it was released in 1994 on Columbia Records Nashville. It produced the singles "Just Enough Rope", "Honky Tonk Crowd", "She Can't Say I Didn't Cry", and "Doctor Time", which peaked at #44, #35, #3, and #5, respectively, on the Billboard country charts. "Walk out Backwards" was a top ten country single for Bill Anderson in 1960 and appeared on his 1962 album Bill Anderson Sings Country Heart Songs. Trevino also recorded "Walk Out Backwards" in Spanish on his previous album, 1993's Dos Mundos. "Honky Tonk Crowd" by Marty Stuart appeared on his 1992 album This One's Gonna Hurt You.

== Track listing ==
No.	Title	Writer(s)	Length
1.	"Honky Tonk Crowd"	Marty Stuart	2:47
2.	"Doctor Time"	Susan Longacre, Lonnie Wilson	3:05
3.	"She Can't Say I Didn't Cry"	Troy Martin, Tony Martin, Reese Wilson	3:17
4.	"Walk Out Backwards"	Bill Anderson	2:40
5.	"Life Can Turn on a Dime"	Allen Shamblin, Austin Cunningham, Reneé C. Willis	2:53
6.	"Just Enough Rope"	Karen Staley, Steve Dean	3:12
7.	"She Just Left Me Lounge"	Todd Snider	3:12
8.	"What I'll Know Then"	Larry Boone, Rick Bowles	3:29
9.	"It Only Hurts When I Laugh"	Kostas, Stuart	2:27
10.	"Un Momento Allá"	Mike McGuire, Billy Maddox, Billy Henderson	3:11^{A}
11.	"Just Enough Rope" (Bilingual version)	Staley, Dean	4:17^{A}

^{A}Spanish translation by José Flores and Victor Guerra.

== Personnel ==
Musicians

- Eddie Bayers – drums
- Mark Casstevens – acoustic guitar
- Paul Franklin – steel guitar
- Sonny Garrish – steel guitar
- Steve Gibson – acoustic guitar, mandolin
- Rob Hajacos – fiddle
- David Hungate – bass guitar
- Roy Huskey Jr. – upright bass
- John Barlow Jarvis – piano
- Brent Mason – electric guitar
- Randy McCormick – piano
- Joey Miskulin – accordion
- Don Potter – acoustic guitar
- Tom Robb – bass guitar
- Hargus "Pig" Robbins – piano
- John Wesley Ryles – background vocals
- Rick Trevino – lead vocals, background vocals, acoustic guitar, piano
- Dennis Wilson – background vocals

Production

- Chuck Ainlay – mixing
- Steve Buckingham – producer
- Pat Hutchinson – assistant engineer
- Ken Hutton – assistant engineer
- Cari Landers – assistant producer
- Graham Lewis – assistant engineer
- Marshall Morgan – engineer, mixing
- Toby Seay – assistant engineer
- Ed Simonton – assistant engineer

== Chart performance ==
Chart (1994)	Peak position
U.S. Billboard Top Country Albums	23
U.S. Billboard 200	119
U.S. Billboard Top Heatseekers	5
