= I Only Get This Way with You =

Single by Rick Trevino

from the album Learning as You Go
- Released: March 31, 1997
- Genre: Country
- Length: 3:38
- Label: Columbia
- Songwriters: Dave Loggins; Alan Ray
- Producers: Steve Buckingham; Doug Johnson

Rick Trevino singles chronology
"Running Out of Reasons to Run" (1996)	"I Only Get This Way with You" (1997)	"See Rock City" (1997)

"I Only Get This Way with You" is a song written by Dave Loggins and Alan Ray, and recorded by American country music artist Rick Trevino. It was released in March 1997 as the third single from the album Learning as You Go. The song reached number 7 on the Billboard Hot Country Singles & Tracks chart.

== Critical reception ==
Deborah Evans Price, of Billboard magazine reviewed the song favorably calling it "well crafted" and "sweetly sentimental". Price goes on to say that Trevino turns in a "warm, thoughtful performance that gives the song a light, dreamy quality."

== Chart performance ==
"I Only Get This Way with You" debuted at number 67 on the U.S. Billboard Hot Country Singles & Tracks for the week of March 22, 1997.

Chart (1997)	Peak position
Canada Country Singles (RPM)	26
US Hot Country Songs (Billboard)	7

=== Year-end charts ===
Chart (1997)	Position
US Country Songs (Billboard)	62
