= Learning as You Go (song) =

Single by Rick Trevino

from the album Learning as You Go
- B-side: "I'm Here for You"
- Released: June 3, 1996
- Genre: Country
- Label: Columbia
- Songwriters: Larry Boone; Billy Lawson
- Producers: Steve Buckingham; Doug Johnson

Rick Trevino singles chronology
"Save This One for Me" (1995)	"Learning as You Go" (1996)	"Running Out of Reasons to Run" (1996)

"Learning as You Go" is a song written by Larry Boone and Billy Lawson, and recorded by American country music artist Rick Trevino. It was released in June 1996 as the first single and title track from the album Learning as You Go. The single reached number 2 on the Billboard Hot Country Singles & Tracks chart.

== Content ==
The song offers a unique twist on the phrase, "learning as you go" as the narrator states that he is learning about relationships now that his significant other has left him.

== Critical reception ==
Deborah Evans Price, of Billboard magazine reviewed the song favorably saying that Trevino has finally recorded a song that he can "sink his teeth into." She says that the song should be a strong contender for airplay in the summer.

== Music video ==
The music video was directed by Jon Small and premiered in May 1996.

== Chart performance ==
"Learning as You Go" debuted at number 63 on the U.S. Billboard Hot Country Singles & Tracks for the week of June 1, 1996.

Chart (1996)	Peak position
Canada Country Singles (RPM)	28
US Hot Country Songs (Billboard)	2

=== Year-end charts ===
Chart (1996)	Position
US Country Songs (Billboard)	32
