= El Gato Negro (song) =

Corrido song

"El Gato Negro" ('The Black Cat') is a very popular corrido whose words and music were written by Salomé Gutiérrez, R. and published by San Antonio Music Publishers, Inc., In 1987 it was performed by Tejano music singer Ruben Ramos and his band The Mexican Revolution. The hit single has been Ramos' trademark since then and has earned him the nickname El Gato Negro. The song tells the story of a young man named El Gato Negro and his bad luck with the law.
