= Don't Mess with the Dragon =

Studio album by Ozomatli
- Released: March 27, 2007
- Length: 42:24
- Label: Concord
- Producer: KC Porter; Ozomatli

Ozomatli chronology
Live at the Fillmore (2005)	Don't Mess with the Dragon (2007)	Fire Away (2010)

Don't Mess with the Dragon is the fourth studio album by American rock band Ozomatli. It was released on March 27, 2007, through Concord Records. Production was handled by the band themselves together with KC Porter. The album peaked at number 154 on the Billboard 200 albums chart in the United States.

== Critical reception ==
Professional ratings
Aggregate scores
Source	Rating
Metacritic	74/100
Review scores
Source	Rating
AllMusic	3/5 stars
Glide	4/5
Los Angeles Times	3/4 stars
PopMatters	8/10
Spin	3/5 stars
Sputnikmusic	4/5

Don't Mess with the Dragon was met with generally favorable reviews from music critics. At Metacritic, which assigns a normalized rating out of 100 to reviews from mainstream publications, the album received an average score of 74, based on eight reviews.

Lana Cooper of PopMatters wrote: "nearly everything about Don't Mess With the Dragon is as fluid and serpentine as the album's namesake". Natalie Nichols of Los Angeles Times found that the band "makes its kitchen-sink musical fusion feel seamless in any given number... Still, "Dragon" can be dizzying in its sheer variety". In her mixed review for AllMusic, Marisa Brown wrote: "it's not that any of these tracks are bad: Ozomatli is comprised of talented enough musicians, and have been doing it for long enough now, that they're able to pretty much successfully pull off anything they try, but these songs move so far from the sociopolitical salsa on which they created themselves that it's almost hard to recognize them as from the same band". Writing for Spin, Mikael Wood stated: "[They] downplay the hip-hop boom-bap... in favor of busy pop jams that mirror the overstimulation of 21st-century life".

== Track listing ==
No.	Title	Length
1.	"Can't Stop"	2:56
2.	"City of Angels"	3:16
3.	"After Party"	3:45
4.	"Don't Mess with the Dragon"	3:23
5.	"La Gallina"	3:05
6.	"Magnolia Soul"	3:21
7.	"Here We Go"	2:38
8.	"La Temperatura"	3:03
9.	"Violeta"	3:53
10.	"Creo"	3:15
11.	"When I Close My Eyes"	3:46
12.	"La Segunda Mano"	6:03
Total length:		42:24

Japanese bonus tracks
No.	Title	Length
13.	"Casas De Carton"	3:58
14.	"La Gallina (Remix)"	3:30

== Charts ==
Chart (2007)	Peak position
US Billboard 200	154
