= Learning as You Go =

Studio album by Rick Trevino
- Released: June 25, 1996; September 24, 1996 (Mi Vida Eres Tú)
- Recorded: 1995–1996
- Genre: Country
- Length: 32:37
- Label: Columbia Nashville
- Producer: Steve Buckingham; Doug Johnson

Rick Trevino chronology
Looking for the Light (1995)	Learning as You Go (1996)	Mi Son (2001)

Mi Vida Eres Tú
- Spanish-language cover

Professional ratings
Review scores
Source	Rating
Allmusic	link

Learning As You Go is the fourth album by Hispanic-American country music singer Rick Trevino. It features "Running Out Of Reasons To Run", which was Trevino's only number-one single on the Billboard Hot Country Singles & Tracks chart. The title track was a #2 hit on the same chart and also reached #1 on the R&R chart, while "I Only Get This Way with You" and "See Rock City" peaked at #7 and #44, respectively.

The album was also released in Spanish under the title Mi Vida Eres Tú ("My Life Is You"), with Spanish-language versions of most of the songs on Learning as You Go.

== Track listing (Learning as You Go) ==
No.	Title	Writer(s)	Length
1.	"Learning as You Go"	Larry Boone, Billy Lawson	3:30
2.	"Running Out of Reasons to Run"	George Teren, Bob Regan	3:05
3.	"I Only Get This Way with You"	Dave Loggins, Alan Ray	3:37
4.	"See Rock City"	Bob DiPiero, John Jarrard, Mark D. Sanders	3:11
5.	"Oh Jenny"	Zack Turner, Tim Nichols	3:07
6.	"Serious Love"	Don Devaney, John Scott Sherrill, David Munyon	3:29
7.	"I Wish He Wouldn't Treat Her That Way"	Rick Orozco, Tony Martin, Reese Wilson	3:12
8.	"Anytime"	Sanders, DiPiero, Jarrard	2:41
9.	"Mary's Just a Plain Jane"	John Ramey, Bobby Taylor, Gene Dobbins	3:21
10.	"I'm Here for You"	Rick Trevino, Gary Harrison	3:23

== Track listing (Mi Vida Eres Tú) ==
1. "Mi Vida Eres Tú (I Only Get This Way with You)" - 3:28^{1}
  - bilingual version of "I Only Get This Way with You"
2. "Estoy Tán Solo" - 3:29^{1}
3. "Se Escapan Mis Razones" - 3:05^{1}
4. "Oh Jenny" - 3:07^{2}
5. "Serio Amor" - 3:30^{2}
6. "Mi Vida Eres Tú" - 3:45^{1}
7. "Me Duele Que la Trate Tan Bien" - 3:13^{1}
8. "Vico Por Ti" - 3:20^{1}
9. "Donde Vas" - 2:41^{2}
10. "Serio Amor" - 4:30^{2}
  - Dance mix
11. "I Only Get This Way with You" - 3:36
  - English-language version
- ^{1}Spanish translation by Manny Benito.
- ^{2}Spanish translation by Frank Varona.

== Personnel (Learning as You Go) ==
- Eddie Bayers – drums
- Steve Buckingham – acoustic guitar
- Dan Dugmore – steel guitar
- Larry Franklin – fiddle, mandolin
- Paul Franklin – steel guitar
- Steve Gibson – acoustic guitar, mandolin
- John Hobbs – piano, keyboards
- Dann Huff – electric guitar
- David Hungate – bass guitar
- Roy Huskey Jr. – upright bass
- Liana Manis – background vocals
- Brent Mason – electric guitar
- Joey Miskulin – accordion
- Farrell Morris – percussion
- Steve Nathan – piano
- Michael Rhodes – bass guitar
- Brent Rowan – electric guitar
- John Wesley Ryles – background vocals
- Joe Spivey – fiddle, mandolin
- Rick Trevino – lead vocals
- Billy Joe Walker Jr. – acoustic guitar
- Biff Watson – acoustic guitar
- Dennis Wilson – background vocals
- Lonnie Wilson – drums
- Reggie Young – electric guitar

== Chart performance ==
Chart (1996)	Peak position
U.S. Billboard Top Country Albums	17
U.S. Billboard 200	117
