= Running Out of Reasons to Run =

Single by Rick Trevino

from the album Learning as You Go
- B-side: "See Rock City"
- Released: November 5, 1996
- Genre: Country
- Length: 3:05
- Label: Columbia
- Songwriters: George Teren; Bob Regan
- Producers: Steve Buckingham; Doug Johnson

Rick Trevino singles chronology
"Learning as You Go" (1996)	"Running Out of Reasons to Run" (1996)	"I Only Get This Way with You" (1997)

"Running Out of Reasons to Run" is a song written by George Teren and Bob Regan, and recorded by American country music artist Rick Trevino. It was released in October 1996 as the second single from his CD Learning as You Go. The song reached the top of the Billboard Hot Country Singles & Tracks chart, Trevino's only Number One on that chart. The song's B-side, "See Rock City", later served as the album's fourth single.

On the Spanish-language version of Trevino's album (titled Mi Vida Eres Tú, English: 'My life is you'), the song was translated into Spanish as "Se Escapan Mis Razones", with translation by Manny Benito.

== Content ==
The song is an up-tempo about a man who has fallen in love so deeply that he doesn't want to move on.

== Critical reception ==
Larry Flick, of Billboard magazine reviewed the song favorably saying that steel guitar and piano "weave their way appealingly through the melody." He goes on to call Trevino's vocal performance "convincing."

== Music video ==
The music video was directed by Martin Kahan and premiered in April 1997.

== Chart positions ==
"Running Out of Reasons to Run" debuted at number 65 on the U.S. Billboard Hot Country Singles & Tracks for the week of October 26, 1996.

Chart (1996–1997)	Peak position
Canada Country Singles (RPM)	6
US Hot Country Songs (Billboard)	1

=== Year-end charts ===
Chart (1997)	Position
Canada Country Tracks (RPM)	85
US Country Songs (Billboard)	47
