= Bobbie Ann Mason (song) =

Single by Rick Trevino

from the album Looking for the Light
- B-side: "San Antonio Rose to You"
- Released: May 2, 1995
- Genre: Country
- Length: 3:15
- Label: Columbia
- Songwriter: Mark D. Sanders
- Producers: Steve Buckingham, Blake Chancey

Rick Trevino singles chronology
"Looking for the Light" (1995)	"Bobbie Ann Mason" (1995)	"Save This One for Me" (1995)

"Bobbie Ann Mason" is a song written by Mark D. Sanders, and recorded by American country music artist Rick Trevino. It was released in May 1995 as the second single from the album Looking for the Light. The song reached number 6 on both the Billboard Hot Country Singles & Tracks and the Canadian RPM Country Tracks chart.

== Content ==
The song is an uptempo, in which the narrator discusses his high school crush, Bobbie Ann Mason. Songwriter Mark Sanders has written that he was inspired to choose the name "Bobbie Ann Mason" for the character in the song because he loved the books In Country and Shiloh and Other Stories by the novelist Bobbie Ann Mason. Sanders wrote that he later received a phone call from Mason, and commented, "It turned out that she was a little put off that I used her name in the song, but I think she got over that."

== Critical reception ==
Deborah Evans Price, of Billboard magazine reviewed the song unfavorably saying that the song is "slick, safe and not very exciting at all."

== Music video ==
The music video was directed by Martin Kahan and premiered in April 1995.

== Personnel ==
- Paul Franklin – steel guitar
- John Jorgenson – electric guitar
- Larry Marrs – bass guitar
- Steve Nathan – piano
- John Wesley Ryles – background vocals
- Rick Trevino – lead vocals
- Blaine Sprouse – fiddle
- Steve Turner – drums
- John Willis – acoustic guitar
- Dennis Wilson – background vocals

== Chart performance ==
"Bobbie Ann Mason" debuted at number 68 on the U.S. Billboard Hot Country Singles & Tracks for the week of May 6, 1995.

Chart (1995)	Peak position
Canada Country Singles (RPM)	6
US Hot Country Songs (Billboard)	6

=== Year-end charts ===
Chart (1995)	Position
US Country Songs (Billboard)	65
