= Looking for the Light =

Studio album by Rick Trevino
- Released: February 7, 1995; March 7, 1995 (Un Rayo de Luz)
- Recorded: 1994
- Genre: Country
- Length: 34:52
- Label: Columbia Nashville
- Producer: Blake Chancey and Steve Buckingham; Cari Landers (Un Rayo de Luz)

Rick Trevino chronology
Rick Trevino (1994)	Looking for the Light (1995)	Learning as You Go (1996)

Un Rayo de Luz

Singles from Looking for the Light
- 1. "Looking for the Light" Released: February 7, 1995; 2. "Bobbie Ann Mason" Released: May 2, 1995; 3. "Save This One for Me" Released: September 9, 1995

Looking for the Light is the third studio album by Hispanic-American country music artist Rick Trevino, released on February 7, 1995. Although its second single "Bobbie Ann Mason" was a Top Ten hit on the Hot Country Singles & Tracks (now Hot Country Songs) charts in 1995, neither of the album's other singles — "Save This One for Me" or the title track — reached Top 40.

The album was also released in Spanish under the title Un Rayo de Luz ("A Ray of Light"), with Spanish-language versions of most of the songs on Looking for the Light. This version charted at #22 on the Top Latin Albums charts.

== Critical reception ==
Entertainment Weekly gave the album a B, saying that Trevino "mixes cliche-ridden heartbreak songs with muscular two-step" and citing "Poor, Broke, Mixed-Up Mess of a Heart" and "Save This One for Me" as standouts. Chris Dickinson gave a three-star review in New Country magazine, comparing Trevino's voice to George Strait's and citing the title track as a "truly vulnerable" performance, although he thought that Trevino sounded too young and forced on "Save This One for Me" and "Bobbie Ann Mason".

== Track listing ==
No.	Title	Writer(s)	Length
1.	"Full Deck of Cards"	Kostas, Melanie Dyer	3:05
2.	"Looking for the Light"	Liz Hengber, Tim Mensy	4:08
3.	"Family Reunion"	Pebe Sebert, John Scott Sherrill	2:39
4.	"You Are to Me"	Mark Cawley, Kye Fleming, Mary Ann Kennedy	3:32
5.	"She Used to Say That to Me"	Jim Lauderdale, Sherrill	2:52
6.	"Poor, Broke, Mixed-Up Mess of a Heart"	Tommy Collins, Merle Haggard	2:15
7.	"I Want a Girl in a Pick-Up Truck"	Bryan Kennedy	2:34
8.	"Save This One for Me"	Mark D. Sanders, Verlon Thompson	3:02
9.	"The Pain"	Rusty Golden, Danny Mayo	3:13
10.	"Bobbie Ann Mason"	Sanders	3:16
11.	"San Antonio Rose to You"	Rick Trevino	4:16

== Track listing (Un Rayo de Luz) ==
1. "Perdí la Partida"
2. "Un Rayo de Luz"
  - bilingual version
3. "Tú Para Mi"
4. "Eso Me Dijo"
5. "Corazón Soñador"
6. "Me la Guardan Para Mi"
7. "Alivia el Dolor"
8. "Tu Eres Mi Verdad"
9. "Ella No Podrá Decir Que No Me Vió Llorar"
10. "Un Rayo de Luz"

== Personnel ==
Tracks 1, 3, 4, 6 - 9, 11

- Eddie Bayers - drums
- Mark Casstevens - acoustic guitar
- Sonny Garrish - steel guitar
- Rob Hajacos - fiddle
- Joey Miskulin - accordion on "I Want a Girl in a Pick-Up Truck"
- Michael Rhodes - bass guitar
- Hargus "Pig" Robbins - piano (Tracks 4 & 11)
- Matt Rollings - piano
- Brent Rowan - electric guitar
- John Wesley Ryles - background vocals
- Rick Trevino - lead vocals
- Dennis Wilson - background vocals

Tracks 2, 5, 10

- Paul Franklin - steel guitar
- John Jorgenson - electric guitar
- Larry Marrs - bass guitar
- Tim Mensy - background vocals on "Looking for the Light"
- Steve Nathan - piano
- John Wesley Ryles - background vocals
- Blaine Sprouse - fiddle
- Rick Trevino - lead vocals
- Steve Turner - drums
- John Willis - acoustic guitar
- Dennis Wilson - background vocals

== Charts ==
=== Weekly charts ===
Chart (1995)	Peak position
US Billboard 200	121
US Top Country Albums (Billboard)	17
US Top Latin Albums (Billboard) Un Rayo De Luz	22

=== Year-end charts ===
Chart (1995)	Position
US Top Country Albums (Billboard)	57
