= Clara A. Reyes =

- Born: 1937; Guadalajara, Jalisco, Mexico
- Died: February 17, 2024 (aged 86)
- Education: University of Guadalajara

Clara A. Reyes (1937 - February 17, 2024) was a Mexican-American woman who founded Dos Mundos Newspaper, Missouri's first Latino bilingual newspaper in Kansas City.

== Early life and education ==
Reyes was born in 1937 in Guadalajara, Jalisco, into a family of 10. She attended the University of Guadalajara and graduated with her dental degree in 1964.

== Career ==
Reyes moved to Kansas City, Missouri, in 1964 to further her dental education. However, her dental degree was not recognized in the United States, and Reyes decided to not return to school due to its cost. Reyes worked as an interpreter and real estate agent.

In 1981, Reyes and her husband founded Dos Mundos Newspaper, Missouri's first Latino bilingual newspaper in Kansas City. In 2006, the couple founded three Spanish-language radio stations: 1250 KYYS-AM, 1340 KDTD-AM, and KYZZ 1480-AM.

In the 1980s and 1990s, Reyes worked with the mayor of Kansas City to improve and beautify Southwest Boulevard.

Reyes became interested in promoting business careers to Latina residents, and served with multiple organizations, including MANA de Kansas City, the Hispanic Chamber of Commerce of Greater Kansas City, the National Federation of Hispanic Owned Publications, and Hispanic Women against Cancer.

== Personal life and death ==
Reyes met Manuel Reyes (d. 2018) while visiting Kansas City around the same time she earned her degree in 1964. Manuel visited Clara in Guadalajara during their courtship. The two moved to Kansas City after they were married. The couple then moved to Overland Park, where they raised two children.

Reyes died on February 17, 2024, following a diagnosis of stage 4 metastatic breast cancer.

== Awards and recognitions ==
- Ohtli Award, Mexican consulate in Kansas City
- 2005 Latino Publisher of the Year, National Association of Hispanic Publications
- 2025 Inductee, Starr Women's Hall of Fame, University of Missouri–Kansas City
