= Paul Livingstone =

- Genres: Hindustani classical music, Raga, Jazz, World music
- Occupations: Composer, Musician
- Instruments: Sitar, fretless guitar and requinto jarocho
- Years active: 1970–present
- Website: Tanpura.com

Paul Livingstone is an American sitarist, composer and multi-instrumentalist. He is one of the few American disciples of Pandit Ravi Shankar, also trained under Rajeev Taranath and Amiya Dasgupta all of the Senia Maihar Gharana.

== Career ==
Paul began his study of sitar and tabla at age 15 living in India. He has performed classical raga music with several of the leading tabla players of India and Nepal including Pandit Swapan Chaudhuri, Abhijit Banerjee, Pandit Shashanka Shekhar Bakshi and Hom Nath Upadhaya. Paul also performs on fretless guitar and Requinto jarocho of his own design. As a composer and director he leads his own Arohi Ensemble plays 'raga jazz chamber music' as well as composing for film, TV, theater and dance He has recorded and or toured with a number of popular artists such as Ozomatli, Alanis Morissette, Beck, HopPo! (Rubén Albarrán of Café Tacvba), and Build an Ark.

Paul has also performed in several music festivals around the world such as the World Festival of Sacred Music and Cumbe Tajin in Mexico. Paul was on the music faculty for 5 years at the California Institute of the Arts, founded the Sangeet School of World music in Los Angeles and has taught creative world music workshops in the US, Mexico Spain & India. Paul also published 'Sitar Talim' a workbook for learning sitar. Paul has taught Indian and creative music for 3 years inner city teenage youth through the Music LA program with support from the Disney corporation, the City of Los Angeles, Cultural Affairs Department and Mayor Antonio Villaraigosa's office.

== Discography ==
=== Albums ===
- Arohi CD (2003) – Paul Livingstone and Arohi are a dynamic ensemble blending Classical Indian, Brazilian and Middle Eastern disciplines with a Jazz sensibility, incorporating new & traditional instruments & authentic styles from over 10 different cultures.
- Salaam Suite CD (2006) – Combining diverse world music and accessible popular styles these songs pull together cutting edge youth culture and authentic music traditions for a message to call us into positive change for the world. This middle eastern creative world music, features members of American groups Ozomatli, Quetzal & Kan Zaman and includes virtuoso artists from South East Asia performing whirling & humorous fresh protest songs, laments, unity anthems, while world Hip Hop grooves & improvisations of traditional Arabic music flow in and out of the album.
- Vinaya CD (2007) – Evening ragas of North Indian classical tradition featuring Paul Livingstone on sitar & Vinayak Netke from Mumbai on tabla. These traditional ragas are made fresh by improvisation and interactive play between the instruments. Features ragas Puriya Dhanashree, Kedar (raga) and Hemant.
- Live Classical Raga (2009) – Paul teams up with Abhijit Banerjee one of the leading tabla players of Kolkata, India with a live concert recording featuring ragas, Marwa, Vatchaspati & Anandi Kalyan.
- Tilak Shyam (2010) – This new release by Los Angeles-based 'Arohi Ensemble' was produced in celebration of Pandit Ravi Shankar's 90th birthday. Composed for an east/west Indian chamber ensemble, it features a dynamic collaboration of virtuoso artists from India and America. This new work is based on a composite raga which Raviji created in 1954 and features four of Ravi's direct disciples, including sarod player Partho Sarothy, sitarist Paul Livingstone, bansuri player Pedro Eustache and cellist Barry Phillips, along with two of the leading percussionists of India, Abhijit Banerjee (musician) on tabla and Somnath Roy on ghatam. This recording is only presently available via digital download.

=== Films ===
==== Composer ====
- Kavi (short) 2009
- Swaroop: Boving Bliss (TV movie) 2001
- Turbans (short) 2000

== Awards and recognitions ==
- APPEX Fellowship in Ubud, Bali (from UCLA/CIP), 2004
- Los Angeles Music Week Award, 2005
- Grammy Award, played sitar Ozomatli's 'Street Signs", Street Signs 2005
