= Serban Ghenea =

Canadian record producer (born 1969)

Serban Ghenea Șerban Ghenea
- Born: Șerban Ghenea; September 13, 1969 (age 57); Bucharest, Romania
- Genres: Pop; hip hop; electronic
- Occupations: Audio engineer; mixer; record producer
- Years active: 1994–present
- Website: serbanghenea.com

Serban Ghenea (Romanian: Șerban Ghenea) is a Romanian-Canadian audio engineer and mixer. He has been nominated for a Grammy Award a total of 61 times and has won 24 times.

== Early life and education ==
Ghenea was born in Romania, and in 1976 he moved to Montreal with his family. He later attended John Abbott College, Concordia University, then McGill University.

Ghenea's son, Alex, is also a mixer and producer. At the 66th (2024) and 67th (2025) Annual Grammy Awards, Șerban and Alex were both nominated in the Best Dance Pop Recording category with separate recordings.

== Career ==
Ghenea's career began through a chance meeting with Teddy Riley in 1993 while visiting his girlfriend (now wife), that led to Riley hiring him as an in-house mixing and recording engineer. Throughout his career, Ghenea has worked with artists in pop music, including Beyonce, Juice Wrld, Ariana Grande, Bee Gees, Adele, Taylor Swift, The Weeknd, Lady Gaga, Demi Lovato, Sabrina Carpenter, Bruno Mars, Britney Spears, Justin Timberlake, and Katy Perry. With Riley, Ghenea worked on projects that included Michael Jackson and Blackstreet. Working at MixStar Studios in Virginia Beach, Virginia, with engineer John Hanes, Ghenea mixed several songs from Swift's Folklore album, and several from Adele's 30 album.

== Awards and nominations ==
=== Grammy Awards ===
The Grammy Awards are awarded annually by the National Academy of Recording Arts and Sciences. Ghenea has won 24 Grammy awards and 3 Latin Grammy awards from 66 total nominations.

Year	Award	Nominated work	Result
Grammy Awards
2004	Best Pop Vocal Album	Justified	Won
2004	Album of the Year	Justified	Nominated
2005	Album of the Year	Confessions	Nominated
2005	Best Latin Rock/Alternative Album	Street Signs	Won
2006	Best Pop Vocal Album	Breakaway	Won
2007	Album of the Year	FutureSex/LoveSounds	Nominated
2008	Best Engineered Album, Non-Classical	Don't Mess With The Dragon	Nominated
2010	Best Dance Recording	"Womanizer"	Nominated
2011	Best Dance Recording	"In For The Kill"	Nominated
2011	Best Electronic/Dance Album	La Roux	Won
2011	Album of the Year	Teenage Dream	Nominated
2013	Best Pop Vocal Album	Stronger	Won
2013	Record of the Year	"Stronger (What Doesn't Kill You)"	Nominated
2013	Record of the Year	"We Are Never Ever Getting Back Together"	Nominated
2014	Album of the Year	Red	Nominated
2015	Record of the Year	"Shake It Off"	Nominated
2016	Record of the Year	"Uptown Funk"	Won
2016	Record of the Year	"Can't Feel My Face"	Nominated
2016	Record of the Year	"Blank Space"	Nominated
2016	Best Pop Vocal Album	1989	Won
2016	Album of the Year	1989	Won
2016	Album of the Year	Beauty Behind the Madness	Nominated
2017	Album of the Year	25	Won
2018	Album of the Year	Melodrama	Nominated
2018	Album of the Year	24K Magic	Won
2018	Best Engineered Album, Non-Classical	24K Magic	Won
2018	Best R&B Album	24K Magic	Won
2018	Record Of The Year	"24K Magic"	Won
2018	Best Urban Contemporary Album	Starboy	Won
2019	Best Alternative Music Album	Colors	Won
2019	Best Engineered Album, Non-Classical	Colors	Won
2019	Best Engineered Album, Non-Classical	Head Over Heels	Nominated
2020	Record of the Year	"7 rings"	Nominated
2020	Album of the Year	thank u, next	Nominated
2021	Album of the Year	folklore	Won
2021	Best Engineered Album, Non-Classical	Hyperspace	Won
2022	Record of the Year	"Leave The Door Open"	Won
2022	Record of the Year	"Montero (Call Me By Your Name)"	Nominated
2022	Record of the Year	"Kiss Me More"	Nominated
2022	Album of the Year	Montero	Nominated
2022	Album of the Year	Planet Her (Deluxe)	Nominated
2023	Album of the Year	30	Nominated
2023	Album of the Year	Good Morning Gorgeous (Deluxe)	Nominated
2023	Album of the Year	Music Of The Spheres	Nominated
2023	Album of the Year	Special	Nominated
2023	Best Dance/Electronic Recording	"I'm Good (Blue)"	Nominated
2023	Record of the Year	"Good Morning Gorgeous"	Nominated
2024	Best Pop Vocal Album	Midnights	Won
2024	Album of the Year	Midnights	Won
2024	Album of the Year	GUTS	Nominated
2024	Best Pop Dance Recording	"One In A Million"	Nominated
2024	Best Pop Dance Recording	"Baby Don't Hurt Me"	Nominated
2024	Record Of The Year	"Anti-Hero"	Nominated
2024	Record Of The Year	"vampire"	Nominated
2024	Record Of The Year	"Worship"	Nominated
2025	Record Of The Year	"Fortnight"	Nominated
2025	Best Dance Pop Recording	"yes, and?"	Nominated
2025	Best Rock Album	Hackney Diamonds	Won
2025	Best Pop Vocal Album	Short n' Sweet	Won
2025	Best Engineered Album, Non-Classical	Short n' Sweet	Nominated
2025	Album Of The Year	Short n' Sweet	Nominated
2025	Album Of The Year	The Tortured Poets Department	Nominated
2026	Album Of The Year	MAYHEM	Nominated
2026	Album Of The Year	Man's Best Friend	Nominated
2026	Best Dance Pop Recording	"Abracadabra"	Won
2026	Record of the Year	"Abracadabra"	Nominated
2026	Record of the Year	"APT."	Nominated
2026	Record of the Year	"Manchild"	Nominated
2027	Record of the Year	"I Just Might"	Pending
2027	Record of the Year	"The Fate of Ophelia"	Pending
2027	Album of the Year	The Romantic	Pending
2027	Album of the Year	The Life of a Showgirl	Pending
2027	Best Engineered Album, Non-Classical	Middle of Nowhere	Pending
Latin Grammy Awards
2005	Best Alternative Music Album	Street Signs	Won
2005	Best Engineered Album	Street Signs	Nominated
2006	Best Engineered Album	Fijación Oral Vol. 1	Won
2006	Album of the Year	Fijación Oral Vol. 1	Won
2022	Album of the Year	Dharma	Nominated
