= Doctor Time =

Single by Rick Trevino

from the album Rick Trevino
- B-side: "What I'll Know Then"
- Released: October 4, 1994
- Genre: Country
- Length: 3:05
- Label: Columbia 77708
- Songwriters: Susan Longacre; Lonnie Wilson
- Producer: Steve Buckingham

Rick Trevino singles chronology
"She Can't Say I Didn't Cry" (1994)	"Doctor Time" (1994)	"Looking for the Light" (1995)

"Doctor Time" is a song written by Susan Longacre and Lonnie Wilson, and recorded by American country music artist Rick Trevino. It was released in October 1994 as the fourth and final single from Trevino's self-titled debut album. It was his second top ten hit on the country charts, reaching number 5 on the Billboard Hot Country Songs chart and his first top ten single in Canada, reaching number 3 on the Canadian RPM country Tracks chart in 1995.

== Content ==
"Doctor Time" is an up-tempo honky-tonk number performed with a steady drum beat accompanied by steel guitar and fiddle. The song's lyrics are inspired by the idea that time heals all hurts. The narrator is asking "Doctor Time" to have mercy on him and heal his heartache.

== Music video ==
The music video was directed by Gerry Wenner and premiered in October 1994.

== Chart performance ==
"Doctor Time" debuted on the U.S. Billboard Hot Country Singles & Tracks for the week of October 8, 1994.

Chart (1994–1995)	Peak position
Canada Country Singles (RPM)	3
US Hot Country Songs (Billboard)	5

=== Year-end charts ===
Chart (1995)	Position
Canada Country Tracks (RPM)	39
