= Non-Stop: Mexico to Jamaica =

Studio album by Ozomatli
- Released: May 5, 2017
- Recorded: Yellow Room Music
- Genre: Alternative rock, latin, pop, reggae, indie, rock
- Length: 46:44
- Label: Cleopatra Records
- Producer: Sly & Robble

Ozomatli chronology
Place in the Sun (2014)	Non-Stop: Mexico to Jamaica (2017)

Professional ratings
Review scores
Source	Rating
AllMusic	4/5 stars

Non-Stop: Mexico to Jamaica is the eighth studio album by Ozomatli, released on Cleopatra Records in May 2017.

== Track listing ==
No.	Title	originally recorded by	Length
1.	"Eres"	Café Tacuba	4:00
2.	"Como la Flor"	Selena	3:40
3.	"Oye Mi Amor"	Maná	3:48
4.	"Bésame Mucho (feat. Herb Alpert)"	Emilio Tuero	2:52
5.	"Noa Noa"	Juan Gabriel	3:09
6.	"La Bamba"	Traditional	3:20
7.	"Solamente Una Vez"	Ana María González	2:28
8.	"Andar Conmigo"	Julieta Venegas	3:42
9.	"De Paisano a Paisano"	Los Tigres del Norte	3:22
10.	"Evil Ways"	Santana	3:27
11.	"Tragos Amargos"	Ramón Ayala	3:13
12.	"Volver, Volver"	Vicente Fernández	3:18
13.	"Land of 1000 Dances"	Chris Kenner	3:20
14.	"Come and Get Your Love"	Redbone	3:05
