= She Can't Say I Didn't Cry =

Single by Rick Trevino

from the album Rick Trevino
- B-side: "She Left Me Lounge"
- Released: May 31, 1994
- Genre: Country
- Length: 3:17
- Label: Columbia 77535
- Songwriters: Troy Martin; Tony Martin; Reese Wilson
- Producer: Steve Buckingham

Rick Trevino singles chronology
"Honky Tonk Crowd" (1994)	"She Can't Say I Didn't Cry" (1994)	"Doctor Time" (1994)

"She Can't Say I Didn't Cry" is a song written by Troy Martin, Tony Martin and Reese Wilson. It was first recorded by Zaca Creek for their 1993 Giant Records album Broken Heartland before it was recorded by American country music artist Rick Trevino. It was released in May 1994 as the third single from his self-titled debut album. It was his first top ten hit on the country charts, reaching number 3 on the Billboard Hot Country Songs chart and number 11 on the Canadian RPM country Tracks chart in late 1994.

== Content ==
"She Can't Say I Didn't Cry" is a mid-tempo ballad performed primarily with acoustic guitar and piano, being accompanied by steel guitar and drums when the chorus builds up.

The narrator of the song responds to things his former lover said of their relationship by admitting that he can't deny that he broke her heart and did nothing to make her stay. He then says in the chorus that she can't say he didn't cry about it afterward.

== Critical reception ==
Deborah Evans Price, of Billboard magazine reviewed the song negatively saying that while Trevino proves himself to be a "competent ballad singer", the song "doesn't give him a lot to work with."

== Music video ==
The music video was directed by Gerry Wenner and premiered in May 1994.

== Chart performance ==
"She Can't Say I Didn't Cry" debuted at number 66 on the U.S. Billboard Hot Country Singles & Tracks for the week of June 4, 1994.

Chart (1994)	Peak position
Canada Country Singles (RPM)	11
US Hot Country Songs (Billboard)	3

=== Year-end charts ===
Chart (1994)	Position
US Country Songs (Billboard)	59
