= Dos Mundos (newspaper) =

- Type: Weekly Newspaper
- Format: Tabloid
- Owner(s): Clara and Manuel Reyes
- Publisher: Manuel Reyes
- Editor: Clara Reyes
- Founded: June 1981
- Language: Spanish and English
- Headquarters: Kansas City, MO United States
- Circulation: 20,000 copies
- ISSN: 1553-3646
- OCLC number: 35125086
- Website: dosmundos.com/webpress/;

Dos Mundos is a weekly bilingual Spanish-English newspaper serving the Kansas City metropolitan area. It was started in June 1981 by Clara Reyes who is the current owner and editor. It currently has a circulation of 20,000.

== History ==
Originally from Guadalajara, Mexico, Clara Reyes started Dos Mundos in 1981, with her husband Manuel Reyes and $5000. Manuel started working full-time in advertising sales starting in 1983.

Started to be an aid to recent immigrants and create a network of Spanish speakers the paper has always been published in both English and Spanish.

The Reyes Media Group was started in October 2006 and has three radio stations for news, sports, and music.

In 2014, Reyes Media Group launched the Mi Zocalo mobile app to keep

As of 2018 the paper's circulation was 20,000.

Reyes Media Group currently owns and prints Dos Mundos.
