= Dos Mundos (Rick Trevino album) =

Studio album by Rick Trevino
- Released: September 14, 1993
- Recorded: 1993
- Genre: Country
- Length: 31:12
- Label: Columbia Nashville
- Producer: Steve Buckingham

Rick Trevino chronology
Dos Mundos (1993)	Rick Trevino (1994)

Dos Mundos is the debut album of country music artist Rick Trevino, released in 1993 on Columbia Records. Its title is Spanish for "Two Worlds". The album produced no chart singles, although "Bastante Cordón" would be re-recorded in English as "Just Enough Rope" and serve as the first single to Trevino's self-titled second album. Also included is a Spanish-language cover of Bill Anderson's "Walk Out Backwards", which Trevino later covered in English on his 1994 self-titled album.

== Track listing ==
1. "Salte de Espalda" (Bill Anderson) – 2:40^{A}
  - Spanish-language version of "Walk Out Backwards"
2. "No Perdí la Razón" (Flores Peregrino, Kim Williams, Lonnie Wilson) – 2:49
3. "Tal Como Ayer" (Larry Boone, Peregrino) – 3:26
4. "Bastante Cordón" (Karen Staley, Steve Dean) – 4:17^{B}
  - Spanish-language version of "Just Enough Rope"
5. "Un Momento Allá" (Mike McGuire, Billy Maddox, Billy Henderson) – 3:11^{B}
6. "Change for a Quarter Moon" (Jeff Crossan) – 3:06
7. "Podría Volar" (Victor Guerra, Jeffrey M. Tweel) – 3:19
8. "Si Quieres Conmigo" (Boone, Guerra, William Robinson) – 3:25
9. "A Quarter at a Time" (Boone, Paul Nelson) – 2:39
10. "Si Tú Ves a un Hombre Llorar" (Guerra, Peregrino, Rick Trevino) – 3:25
- ^{A}Spanish-language translation by Flores Peregrino
- ^{B}Spanish-language translation by Flores Peregrino and Victor Guerra

== Personnel ==
- Eddie Bayers - drums
- Mark Casstevens - acoustic guitar
- Paul Franklin - steel guitar
- Sonny Garrish - steel guitar
- Steve Gibson - acoustic guitar, mandolin
- Rob Hajacos - fiddle
- David Hungate - bass guitar
- John Barlow Jarvis - piano
- Randy McCormick - piano
- Brent Mason - electric guitar
- Tom Robb - bass guitar
- Rick Trevino - lead vocals, background vocals
