= Beatle Bob =

American dancer (1953–2023)

- Born: Robert E. Matonis; January 12, 1953; St. Louis, Missouri, U.S.
- Died: July 27, 2023 (aged 70); St. Louis, Missouri, U.S.
- Education: University of Missouri–St. Louis
- Occupations: Dancer, nightclub performer
- Years active: 1960–2023

Robert E. Matonis (January 12, 1953 – July 27, 2023), better known as Beatle Bob, was an American dancer and a well-known figure in the St. Louis, Missouri music scene. He was known for his arrhythmic dance moves, Beatles-inspired "mop top" hairstyle, and tailored 1960s-style suits. He was often seen doing his characteristic dancing at a wide range of concerts, both in the crowd and onstage with the performers. His constant presence and dancing was welcomed by some concertgoers and an aggravation to others. He allegedly went to at least one live show every night from Christmas Eve 1996, and saw over 10,000 bands.

== Early life ==
Beatle Bob was born Robert Matonis in St. Louis on January 12, 1953. His parents divorced when he was very young. He grew up between his mother's house on the South Side of St. Louis, his grandparents' house in Baden, and a nearby Catholic boarding school, Mount Providence (now part of the University of Missouri–St. Louis campus). It was at Mount Providence that Matonis acquired the nickname "Beatle Bob". One day during sixth-grade geography class, he was reading a Beatles magazine concealed within an open textbook. When the nun caught him, she snatched the magazine from him and exclaimed, "That will be enough of that, Beatle Bob!" The name stuck. In 1966, while at Mount Providence, Matonis and fellow pupil Ed Zachow established a rock & roll newsletter entitled U.S. - the United Saviours. After discovering The Beatles at a local record store near his mother's house on Michigan Avenue, Southside Music, Matonis and friends created a Beatles museum in one of their basements and charged visitors to get in. As a youth, Matonis was also an autograph hunter.

After Mount Providence, Matonis attended Augustinian Academy in South St. Louis, and then Southwest High School, graduating in 1971. Academic records state that he graduated from the University of Missouri–St. Louis in 1983 with a degree in social work, though Matonis himself has cited 1983 as the date of his graduation. According to his employment record, he worked as a loader for the United Parcel Service from 1983 to 1997.

Matonis first adopted "Beatle Bob" as a nickname in 1980, when he began contributing to the now-defunct music magazine Jet Lag. His first review was of a concert by Jan and Dean.

== Personal life ==
In interviews in 2004 and 2006, Matonis stated that his main job was working as a social worker with troubled youths in St. Louis, as well as freelancing for the monthly St. Louis restaurant review magazine Sauce and other music magazines.

Matonis was single. He was a vegetarian from 1981, and never smoked, drank alcohol, or took drugs. In the 2004 interview he said that he averaged four hours sleep a night. He did not drive, and relied on rides from friends or public transport to attend shows. He was 6ft 3in (190.5 cm).

Matonis was diagnosed with ALS in February 2022. He died from complications of the disease in St. Louis, on July 27, 2023, at the age of 70.

== Concert attendance ==
Matonis said that his first concert, at the age of seven, was when his uncle took him to a Jerry Lee Lewis show in Ste. Genevieve, Missouri, on 7 November 1960.

Matonis started attending concerts in St. Louis in the late 1970s, and by the early 1980s had become a recognisable figure on the local concert circuit. According to one local musician, Matonis came to be considered a tastemaker, and his attendance at a concert meant that the band in question was "cool". Among local audiences, "there's a saying that if Beatle Bob is there, you're at the right show". Matonis claimed to have been to at least one live show every night since Christmas Eve 1996, and seen over 10,000 bands over the last decade, which he chronicled in a "dance diary".

On 10 August 2010, Matonis hosted a show at the Blueberry Hill Duck Room in St. Louis to mark his 5,000th consecutive day of live shows.

Matonis also regularly attended music festivals around the United States, including Bonnaroo Music Festival in Manchester, Tennessee, City Stages, SXSW, Lollapalooza, Sleazefest (which includes a Beatle Bob Dance Contest), and the New Orleans Jazz and Heritage Festival. He was the emcee at the final Guided by Voices show at Metro in Chicago on December 31, 2004, and introduced Sleater-Kinney at their last touring show during Lollapalooza in 2006. He introduced Camper van Beethoven and The Flaming Lips at Wakarusa Music & Camping Festival in Lawrence, Kansas in June 2006. He also emceed the "Last Call at the Nights" on January 19, 2007, the final show held at Mississippi Nights on Laclede's Landing in St. Louis. On August 3, 2007, Matonis was seen at the Lollapalooza Festival in Chicago, Illinois, dancing onstage with The Polyphonic Spree and introducing a Mississippi band, Colour Revolt. He also introduced the Sam Roberts Band onstage on August 4, 2007, and spent their set dancing offstage. He was seen again on August 5 at Lollapalooza introducing the rock band Dios and dancing with them onstage, and later introducing indie rock band Yo La Tengo. He introduced Cornmeal at Wakarusa Music & Camping Festival in 2011. He was in Columbia, Missouri on September 30, 2016, at The Roots N Blues N BBQ Festival.

Matonis cited the James Brown & the Famous Flames concert at the Kiel Auditorium in St. Louis on April 21, 1968, as his all-time favorite.

On January 23, 2023, Matonis announced on social media that due to the effects of ALS, his concert streak would be coming to an end. According to Matonis, the streak lasted from December 25, 1996 until January 23, 2023, a total of 9,439 nights, interrupted for 85 nights in 2020 due to the COVID-19 pandemic.

== Other music industry activities ==
As well as contributing to Jet Lag for around ten years, Matonis wrote a monthly "Top Ten" of local concerts for Sauce Magazine, and a regular column for Night Times Magazine from 1995 to 1998. He also used to produce an annual Phil Spector Christmas Special for local community radio station, KDHX, although members of the local music scene have disputed his claims that he hosted a regular radio show or owned a radio station.

Beatle Bob and his dancing are featured in the video for "My Kind of Soldier" by Guided By Voices, and in Lit's DVD "All Access".

== Dancing ==
Matonis described his dancing style as a combination of 1960s dances including The Duck, The Twist, The Frug, and The Loco-Motion. According to Matonis, "my signature move is I get my right leg and I twist it behind my left like a bowling move, like you're bowling and then I twirl my right hand to the side like you're rolling dice". Another common move involves a slow-motion tai chi style movement. A profile for local public radio station KWMU described it as "the most awkward, yet intense version of the "white man dance" you've ever seen". Matonis almost always danced alone, and his dancing style did not change according to the genre of music at the concert. Though he started dancing in 1975, Matonis cited the main inspiration for his solo dancing as observing a friend dancing compulsively at a Dwight Twilley concert in 1975.

In 2003, Louisiana-based roots rock band Dash Rip Rock recorded a song about Matonis' dancing entitled "Do The Beatle Bob".

== Reception ==
Matonis received both positive and negative reception of his dancing and concert attendance. Robert Schneider of The Apples in Stereo said that "in a business that breeds pretension, it's heartwarming to see someone respond so honestly to the music". Local club owner Bob Putnam described Matonis as "the glue that keeps the St. Louis music scene together", adding that for local bands who are unlikely to find career success, seeing Matonis dancing in front of them can make them feel special.

However, Matonis also faced criticism from other concert-goers. He was repeatedly accused of stealing merchandise, and misrepresenting his own connections to the music industry, and musicians took issue with the fact that he rarely paid money to see live music, robbing the performing artist of revenues. One strategy involves securing free entry to events by claiming to be associated with local radio station KDHX, for which he was criticised by staff at the station. He was banned from several clubs and record stores in the St. Louis area. Matonis himself claimed that most of these incidents were a result of misunderstandings.

Some concert-goers also found his frenetic dancing disruptive and selfish; a website was set up by a local music fan, beatlebobsitdown.com, for other audience members to post complaints about Matonis. In their blog, St. Louis indie-rock band So Many Dynamos remarked, "So what's the problem? Well, he always gets into shows free, always shows up late, and always pushes his way past everybody to get to the front right by the stage. This is extra annoying because we always try to make our shows as comfortable as possible for us and for the people that like our band... The other issue is that I have personally seen him steal things from show patrons and from bands. Once, I went to a show, saw him walk to the back of the venue where some kid had set his jacket, drape it over his arm, and walk out."
