= William Marrufo =

American drummer

William Jesus Marrufo
- Genres: Latin, Hip hop
- Occupation: Drummer

William Jesus Marrufo was the drummer for the band Ozomatli.

On January 5, 2005, Marrufo was arrested for beating, slashing and stabbing his mother to death with two meat cleavers and a boning knife. Marrufo informed detectives that he believed his mother was possessed by Satan and that he was trying to save her soul. He was convicted in 2006 of first degree murder with an enhancement for the personal use of a deadly weapon. Marrufo was subsequently found not guilty by reason of insanity and was placed into a state mental institution.
