= Ruben Ramos (musician) =

American singer

- Born: Rubén Pérez Ramos
- Origin: Sugar Land, Texas, U.S.
- Genres: Tejano, Mariachi
- Years active: 1960–present
- Website: rubenramos.com

Ruben Ramos, also known as El Gato Negro, is an American Tejano music performer. Beginning his music career in the late 1960s, Ruben's fame has grown throughout the years as he formed his distinct musical style. In March 1998, Ruben was inducted into the Tejano Music Awards Hall of Fame and later won Best Male Vocalist in 1999. His band, The Mexican Revolution, also won album of the year in 2008.

== Early life ==
Ruben Ramos was born into a family music legacy dating back to post-World War I Texas. Ruben's uncles began performing just after World War I in 1919 as Juan Manuel Perez y Los Serenaders. Meanwhile, Ruben's father, Alfonso Ramos Sr., worked the cotton fields and the railroads; he also played the fiddle while his mother, Elvira Perez, played the guitar at family gatherings. At the end of World War II, Ruben's Uncle Justin re-formed the band as Justin Perez and His Ex-GIs. Ruben's sister, Inez, joined the band as a singer in 1947. Then, in his early teens, Ruben's older brother Alfonso Ramos Jr. joined their uncle's group.

In the mid-1950s, the band became the Alfonso Ramos Orchestra. Ruben continued with the band on weekends, increasingly singing English cover R&B tunes, even after landing a "good job" with the state insurance department. Now, all five Ramos brothers were performing. As the orchestra's drummer, Ruben performed throughout the 1960s with Alfonso's band. The band played a mix of tunes, from cha chas and cumbias to boleros and rancheras. Ruben provided the vocals and pushed many of the English songs the band played.

== Career ==
=== The "Revolution" ===
In 1969, Ruben formed a new band called "The Mexican Revolution." He chose the name 'Mexican Revolution' due to the emergence of the Chicano and civil rights movements. During that period, the band played the Chicano circuit from Dallas-Fort Worth to the Rio Grande Valley. By 1981, "Tejano" had become the new term for the music he had been playing, so Ruben changed the band name to the Texas Revolution.

In 1985, Alfonso and Ruben reunited for a series of albums and were both named best vocal duo at the 1987 Tejano music Awards. By this time, Ramos had scored with the regional hit "El Gato Negro" (The Black Cat), which also became his nickname. In the '90s, Ruben continued playing with a live horn section, eschewing the trend by many bands to substitute synthesizers and keyboards. Ruben later changed the band's name to The Mexican Revolution in the early 2000s. Thanks to brother "Pia" Ramos, bringing to mind the early battles of the Mexican Revolution, which the ancestors of the Perez family had fought in, the band decided to pay homage to the past by changing its name to the Mexican Revolution.

The band consists of: Ruben Ramos (vocals/percussion), Rick Fuentes (accordion/keys/bass/guitar/vocals), Bobby Dominguez (bass), Joe Ramos (guitar/keys/vocals), Christopher Rivera (drums/vocals), Don Wise (tenor saxophone), Fabian Hernandez (alto and tenor saxophones), William "Wild Bill" Perkins (trumpet), Duane Hargis (trumpet). Mark Ramos (Ruben's son) is the stage manager and runs the light and special effects show, while Ruben's other son, Ruben Renee Ramos, works as the sound engineer.

Ruben Ramos & The Mexican Revolution have been nominated for a Grammy Award two years in a row, for the 35th Anniversary album, and the Viva La Revolucion album. The latter won the 2009 Grammy for "Best Tejano album".
