= Wil-Dog Abers =

- Also known as: Breakdance Willy, El Gavachillo, Married Man
- Born: Willy Abers
- Origin: Los Angeles
- Occupation: Bassist
- Instrument: Bass guitar
- Years active: 1998-present
- Member of: Ozomatli
- Formerly of: Los Super Seven
- Website: www.myspace.com/wildogsbanda

Willy "Wil-Dog" Abers is a bassist primarily for the LA-based Ozomatli band, but has also played in Los Super Seven, a Latin rock supergroup.

== Early life ==
Wil-Dog, also sometimes called "Breakdance Willy" as he is an accomplished breakdancer. He is of Jewish descent. His father was in the Revolutionary Communist Party, and he was raised mostly by his grandparents. From an early age, he saw, first-hand, police violence, racism, and anti-Semitism. He dropped out of high-school in the 11th grade and spent all his time stealing, smoking marijuana, and living out of his car. Eventually, he joined an at-risk youth-center, where he found his purpose and joined Ozomatli. Wil-Dog is a Pisces.

== Career ==
Ozomatli cut their self-titled first CD in 1998. In 2001, Wil-Dog participated in the recording of two albums, Ozomatli's second album Embrace the Chaos and Los Super Seven's Canto. Other Ozomatli albums followed, including the Coming Up EP, their third album Street Signs and the live CD / DVD Live at the Filmore. Aside from playing bass, Wil-Dog contributed songwriting and backup vocals. He endorses the "Variax Bass 700". He and fellow band member Justin Porée have also provided the voice of the announcer in the Dance Dance Revolution series since the release of Dance Dance Revolution X.

In 2012, he began a side project billing himself as "El Gavachillo" singing traditional Mexican banda music.
