= Ozomatli =

American rock band

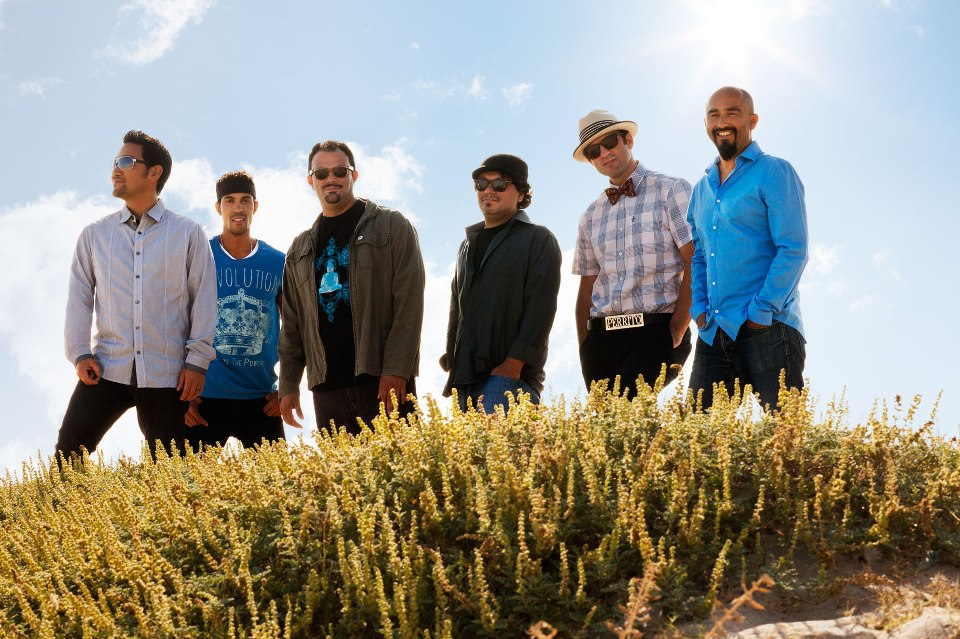
- Ozomatli 2012

Background information
- Origin: Los Angeles, California, U.S.
- Genres: Rap rock; Chicano rock; funk; hip hop; Latin rock; world fusion
- Years active: 1995–present
- Labels: Almo Sounds (1998–1999); Interscope (2001–2002); Concord/Real World (2004–2007); Downtown/Mercer Street (2010); Hornblow/Vanguard (2012–); Cleopatra Records (2017); ONErpm (2019); Blue Élan Records (2021–)
- Website: www.ozomatli.com

Ozomatli is an American rock band, formed in 1995 in Los Angeles. They are known both for their vocal activist viewpoints and incorporating a wide array of musical styles – including salsa, jazz, funk, reggae, hip hop, and others. The group formed in 1995 and has since released seven studio albums. Although the band has had many member changes over the years and has sometimes had as many as ten members, the current six members have been in the band since its debut album.

In 1998, Ozomatli released its self-titled debut album, and soon after opened for Santana on their Supernatural Tour. The group released Embrace the Chaos in 2001, followed by Street Signs in 2004. Don't Mess with the Dragon followed in 2007, which saw the band experimenting with a more diverse array of musical styles. The group composed music for Happy Feet 2 and recorded Ozomatli Presents Ozokidz, a family-friendly album. From 2011 to 2014, Ozomatli also served as the house band for stand-up comedian Gabriel Iglesias' television show, Gabriel Iglesias Presents Stand Up Revolution.

The group is also known for advocating for promoting various social causes, such as farm-workers' rights and immigration reform.

== History ==
=== 1995–1998: Formation and debut album ===
Ozomatli take their name from the Nahuatl word from the astrological symbol of the monkey, taken from the Aztec calendar. Ozomatli is also a god of dance, fire, the new harvest, and music. In 1995, all the members met while attempting to form a workers union within Los Angeles. Though they were not able to win recognition, they were given an abandoned building for one month. The building turned into a cultural arts center, and within it Ozomatli was born.

In a 2007 NPR interview, band members Jiro Yamaguchi and Ulises Bella describe Ozomatli:

You drive down Sunset Boulevard and turn off your stereo and roll down your windows and all the music that comes out of each and every different car, whether it's salsa, cumbia, merengue, or Hip Hop, funk or whatever, it's that crazy blend that's going on between that cacophony of sound is Ozomatli, y'know?

The band's first album, Ozomatli, was released on June 16, 1998, on Almo Sounds. At the time, in addition to the band's six constant members, namely vocalist/trumpet player Asdru Sierra, vocalist/guitarist Raul Pacheco, sax and clarinet player Ulises Bella, bassist Wil-Dog Abers and percussionists Justin 'El Niño' Porée and Jiro Yamaguchi, Ozomatli also featured MC Chali 2na, turntablist Cut Chemist, drummer William Marrufo, and saxophone player Jose Espinoza. The album featured the band's trademark mix of several types of Latin music: tropical genres like merengue and cumbia, Mexican styles like norteño, along with Jamaican music like ska and reggae, mixed with a heavy dose of American hip-hop and funk, often with a few genres mixed together in the same song. The band sang its socially-conscious (but sometimes humorous) lyrics mostly in Spanish, while Chali 2na's rapped in English.

The album reached mainstream success following an appearance on the late night talk show Vibe!. It reached No. 7 on the Billboard Latin Albums chart (71 weeks) and No. 4 on the Billboard Latin Pop Albums chart (50 weeks). Two singles released from the album were "Cut Chemist Suite" and "Super Bowl Sundae". In 1999, Ozomatli joined Mana and Carlos Santana on tour following Santana's release of Supernatural, and in 2002, the band appeared on "One of These Days", the penultimate track on the latter's album Shaman.

=== 1999–2005: Embrace the Chaos and Street Signs ===
Ozomatli's second album, Embrace the Chaos, was released on September 11, 2001, the same day as the September 11 attacks. Although many American bands cancelled their concerts, Ozomatli gained some recognition for continuing to play their concerts, all the while continuing their commitment to social justice and progressive politics, in addition to the rising anti-war movement. The album featured a similar mix of Latin and hip-hop music as the debut had, with the lyrics taking an even more political stance. In 2002, Embrace the Chaos won a Grammy for the Best Latin Rock/Alternative Album.

By the album's release, the band had experienced several member changes: drummer William Marrufo had been replaced by Andy Mendoza, and MC Chali 2na, turntablist Cut Chemist, and saxophone player Jose Espinoza had all left. With no official MC for the rap vocals, the band used a variety of guest MCs on the album, including Kanetic Source. Percussionist Justin Porée also did some of the rap vocals for the first time. Rene 'DJ Spinobi' Dominguez also appeared on turntables as a guest. While touring for the album, Kanetic Source and DJ Spinobi both joined the lineup.

In 2003, Ozomatli released a six-song EP through Concord Records, featuring a collaboration with the Kumbia Kings on "Mi Gente". In addition to Kanetic Source and DJ Spinobi, the album also featured new members Sheffer Bruton on trombone and Mario Calire on drums. The EP featured mostly the band's Latin-influenced side, with most lyrics in Spanish, although the song 'Let Me Dream' was the first song sung (as opposed to rapped) entirely in English that would appear on their recorded releases.

Before recording their next album, Kanetic Source was replaced by M.C. Jabu Smith-Freeman. The resulting 10-man lineup: the core of Sierra, Pacheco, Bella, Abers, Porée and Yamaguichi joined by Bruton, Calire, MC Jabu and Dj Spinobi would last for the next few years.

In 2004, Street Signs was released under Concord Records. In 2001, the album won the Grammy for "Best Latin Rock/Alternative Album2005, The album also won the Latin Grammy Award for Best Alternative Music Album in 2005. ". In addition to MC Jabu's rap vocals, Porée played a bigger role than before as second MC, and original MC Chali 2na guested on one song as well. The album expanded the band's sound even farther, with a Middle-Eastern influence featured on some tracks. While it was still predominantly in Spanish, the band was also singing more in English as well.

In 2005, Ozomatli released their live album Live at the Fillmore, recorded at The Fillmore in San Francisco.

=== 2006–2009: Don't Mess with the Dragon ===
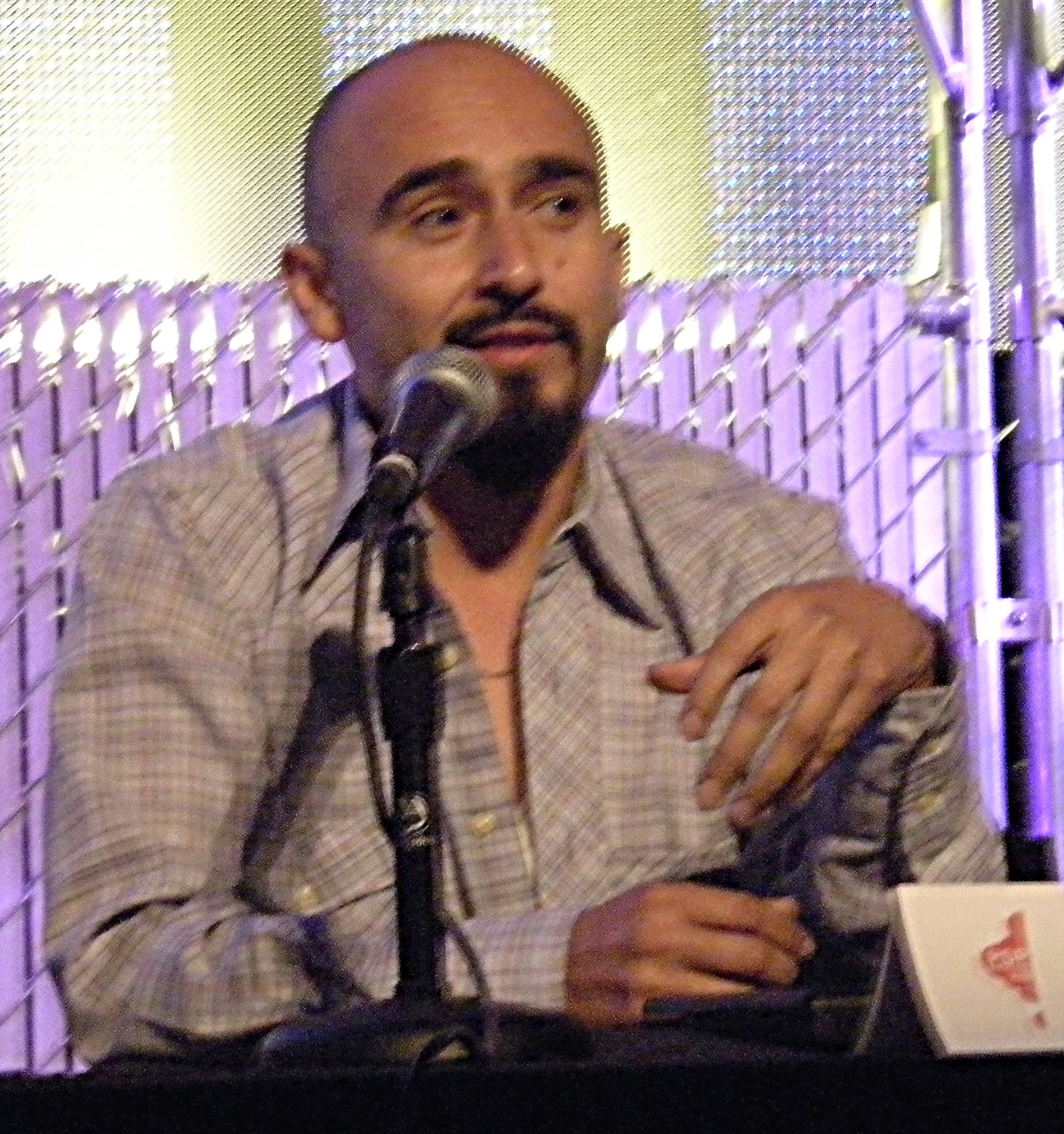
Guitarist Raúl Pacheco on the keynote panel of 2008 Pop Conference

In 2006, Ozomatli were invited by the U.S. State Department to serve as official Cultural Ambassadors on a series of government-sponsored international tours. The band has since traveled to Asia, Africa, South America, the Middle East, Tunisia, India, Jordan, Nepal, Myanmar, Vietnam, Thailand, and China.

In late 2006, shortly before the release of Don't Mess With the Dragon, DJ Spinobi left the band to pursue personal projects (but stuck around until the album's release, as he appears in the photos and is credited as a member). This was the end of the longest lasting Ozomatli lineup, and the first of many lineup changes that would occur over the next year and a half.

April 3, 2007, saw the release of their fourth studio album Don't Mess With The Dragon, which was co-produced by K. C. Porter and released on Concord Records. The genre-crossing album was written at a local Los Angeles Latino art gallery, Tropico de Nopal. The album includes songs such as "After Party", which pays homage to old-school Chicano R&B, "When I Close My Eyes", which nods back to Fishbone and Oingo Boingo, "La Segunda Mano", which features the vocals of Quetzal's Martha Gonzales blending son jarocho with hip-hop, "City of Angels", which celebrates the city of Los Angeles, and "Temperatura", which was inspired by the May 2006 pro-immigration marches. The band also experimented with a more accessible Latin-pop sound on songs like "Can't Stop" and "Here We Go", and for the first time featured more English lyrics than Spanish lyrics.

On September 20, 2007, Ozomatli announced that MC Jabu was leaving the group on amicable terms. He would not be officially replaced, although Tre Hardson would take his place on tour in 2007 and 2008.

In early 2008, the group did a song for the Los Angeles Dodgers called "Can't Stop the Blue", their first recording with Tre Hardson. In the video, LA drummer Chris Cano is seen in place of Calire. Shortly thereafter, Sheffer Bruton and Tre Hardson were no longer seen playing with the group, and Mario Calire appeared back on the drumseat. In the summer of 2008, Ozomatli announced Chali 2na would be joining them for their Fall 2008 tour, although he did not permanently rejoin the band. Later that year, group members Wil-dog and Justin contributed their voices to the Konami music game Dance Dance Revolution X as in-game announcers.

=== 2010–present: Stripped-down lineup ===
In 2010, Ozomatli released their fifth full-length album, "Fire Away", which was recorded by a stripped-down lineup, featuring the six constant members plus Carire on drums. Justin Porée, in addition to his percussion duties, also became the band's only MC on the album and also sang some lead vocals as well. Bassist Abers also got his first lead vocal spot on the song 'Caballito.' While the band's sound remained an eclectic mix, there was a noticeable drop in the influence of Latin musics, and not many lyrics in Spanish. Several of the songs featured a more accessible, R&B-based sound. The album also had fewer overtly political songs, although the track 'Gay Vatos in Love' made a clear statement of support for LGBT rights.

In 2010, Ozomatli helped celebrate the Boston Pops 125th Anniversary, accompanied by the Boston Symphony Orchestra. Since that first orchestral collaboration, they have gone on to perform with the National Symphony Orchestra at the Kennedy Center, the Colorado Symphony, the San Diego Symphony, and the New York Pops.

Ozomatli made an appearance at TEDxSF – the first musical talk ever given at any TED conference – mixing discussion and sound to explore the challenges and promises of musical identities in a global age.

Ozomatli has also been involved in composing and scoring and contributing music to Happy Feet 2 and Elmo's Musical Monsterpiece for Warner Brothers Interactive, SIMS for EA Games, music for PBS Kids, the films A Better Life and Harlistas, and for the TV Show Standup Revolution on Comedy Central.

In this period of time, the band focused on Ozomatli Presents Ozokidz, a special family-friendly set geared towards performing for children and adults alike. The album was released on Hornblow Recordings in September 2012.

The next record was Place in the Sun released in 2014, and featuring Dave Stewart's production and co-writing, released on Vanguard. The album featured somewhat of a return to the Latin-flavored sounds of the band's earlier work, with more lyrics in Spanish than the previous two albums, although English remained the primary language. It was recorded by the same lineup as the previous album, with Carire on drums. Calire subsequently left the band, and percussionist Jiro Yamaguchi took over the drum seat, leaving the band with six members.

Ozomatli celebrated their 20th anniversary as a performing band in 2015, with all remaining members having been in the band since its debut album,

The band's next project, released in May 2017, was Nonstop Mexico to Jamaica, an album of songs that have been a big part of the Mexican and Mexican-American community's heritage, culling from Selena, Cafe Tacuba, Mana, and many others. As reflected in the title, the songs are approached reggae style and the project was being produced by Jamaican reggae legends, Sly and Robbie. Although the album contains be some English-language lyrics, the album was the band's first Spanish-dominated release since Street Signs.

In 2021, Ozomatli released a cover of Ramon Ayala's "La Rama Del Mezquite", featuring Cherine Anderson. As part of their 25th anniversary, the band also announced a new album in development, to be released via Blue Élan Records.

== Social and political activism ==
Ozomatli create music to: give voice to and reveal the culture and lives of Latinos; fight for workers' rights; and promote a global unity within both the city and the world. They promote this through their music, during their TEDxSF talk, and as Cultural Ambassadors of the US.

Ozomatli created music for the award-winning documentary feature film Seeds for Liberation (2026) by director Matthew Solomon. The film discusses the Free Palestine movement.

== Members ==
=== Current members ===
- Wil-Dog Abers: Bass, marimbula, backing vocals, occasional lead vocals
- Raúl Pacheco: Guitar, tres, jarana, vocals
- Justin 'El Niño' Porée: Percussion, rap vocals, lead vocals, backing vocals
- Asdrubal Sierra: Trumpet, lead vocals, piano
- Ulises Bella: Saxophone, background vocals, requinto jarocho, keyboard, melodica
- Jiro Yamaguchi: Drums, percussion, backing vocals

=== Past/Guest members ===
- Chali 2na: Rap vocals on Ozomatli and as a guest on "Street Signs"
- Cut Chemist: Turntables on Ozomatli and as a guest on Embrace the Chaos
- William Marrufo: drums on Ozomatli
- Jose Espinosa: Alto sax on Ozomatli (DOB Unknown – January 5, 2011)
- DJ Infamous: Turntables on tour 1998
- Kid.W.I.K.: Turntables on tour 1998–2000
- Kanetic Source: Rap vocals on Embrace The Chaos and Coming Up EP
- Andy Mendoza: drums on Embrace the Chaos
- Rene 'DJ Spinobi' Dominguez: Turntables on Embrace the Chaos (as guest), Coming Up EP, Street Signs, and Don't Mess with the Dragon
- M.C. Jabu Smith-Freeman: Rap vocals on Street Signs and Don't Mess with the Dragon
- Tre Hardson (The Pharcyde): rap vocals, background vocals on tours in fall 2007 and early 2008
- Chris Cano: Drums (during Mario Calire's frequent absences in 2008)
- Sheffer Bruton: Trombone on Street Signs and Don't Mess with the Dragon
- Mario Calire: Drums
- Wally Valdez: Drums
- Michael Duffy: Drums

== Discography ==
=== Studio albums ===
- Ozomatli (1998) Almo Sounds
- Embrace the Chaos (2001) Interscope
- Street Signs (2004) Concord Records, Real World Records
- Don't Mess with the Dragon (2007) Concord Records
- Fire Away (2010) Downtown Records, Mercer Street
- Ozomatli Presents Ozokidz (2012) Hornblow Records
- Place in the Sun (2014)
- Non-Stop: Mexico to Jamaica (2017)
- Marching On (2020) Blue Élan Records

=== Live albums ===
- Live at the Fillmore (2005) Concord Records

=== EPs ===
- Ya Llego EP (1997)
- Coming Up EP (2003)

=== Other contributions ===
- Eklektikos Live (2005) – "Believe"
- Change is Now: Renewing America's Promise (2009) – "Can't Stop"
- Piranha 3D (2010) – Nadas por Free

== Non-album tracks ==
- "One of these Days" with Santana on Shaman
- "April 29, 1992 (Miami)", a Sublime cover on the Sublime tribute album, Look at All the Love We Found
- "Ebin", another Sublime cover from another tribute album, Forever Free
- "Whipped Cream (Anthony Marinelli Remix)" and "Love Potion #9 (Anthony Marinelli Remix)" with Herb Alpert on Whipped Cream & Other Delights - Rewhipped
- "Let The Horn Blow", "Plato", and "En Este Varrio" with Delinquent Habits on their New and Improved album
- "Nubes" a Caifanes cover from Nos Vamos Juntos, a tribute to Jaguares and Caifanes.
- "La Luz del Ritmo", a Los Fabulosos Cadillacs cover from Carnaval Toda la Vida, a tribute album.
- They performed a version of the theme song to Weeds, "Little Boxes"
- Some of the members of Ozomatli including Wil-Dog Abers, Justin Poree, Ulises Bella, Raul Pacheco performed on the song "Morena" by David Rolas. This song was also produced by Wil-Dog Abers and also features Taboo of the Black Eyed Peas.
- "Monster" for The David Lynch Foundation (DLF) ‘Download for Good’ campaign through PledgeMusic.
- Wrote and composed the music to the Happy Feet Two Videogame soundtrack.
- "Jardinero" composed for the film A Better Life.
- Ozo currently serves as the house band to Gabriel Iglesias Presents Stand Up Revolution, where they wrote and premiered the music video for the song "Hey! It's Fluffy!" featuring Iglesias.
- "La Rama Del Mezquite," featuring Cherine Anderson.
