= Z-trip discography =

This is a complete listing of musical compositions, tracks, single, albums and EPs by DJ Z-Trip.

== Albums ==
- Z-Trip & Talib Kweli: "Attack The Block" (2012)
- Z-Trip: "Victory Lap" (Hard Left Records) (2009)
- Z-Trip: "Party for Change" (Hard Left Records) (2008)
- Z-Trip & Lateef: Ahead of the Curve Quannum Projects (2007)
- Z-Trip: Shifting Gears Hollywood Records (2005)
- Z-Trip: Uneasy Listening, Vol. 1 (Independent release in collaboration with DJ P) (1999)

== EPs ==
- Z-Trip & MSTRKRFT: Soundclash of the Titans (2007) Album Art by Shepard Fairey
- Z-Trip: Listen to the DJ 12-inch (feat. Soup of Jurassic 5) (2005, Hollywood Records)
- Z-Trip: Shock and Awe 12-inch (feat. Chuck D of Public Enemy) (2005, Hollywood Records)
- Z-Trip: Breakfast Club 10-inch (feat. Murs and Supernatural) (2005, Hard Left Records)
- Z-Trip & Space Travelers: Black Hole / Further Explorations Into the Black Hole 12-inch (2000, Future Primitive Sound)
- Z-Trip: Rhythmic Metaphor 12-inch (release year unknown, Ubiquity Records)

== Soundtracks ==
- Z-Trip: Sound & Vision (2012)
- Z-Trip: All Pro (Production) (2007, Decon Records)
- Various Artists: skate. (Soundtrack) (Composer) (2007)
- Z-Trip & Garron Chang: Infamy (Movie Theme) (composer) (2006)
- Various Artists: Small Soldiers (Soundtrack) ("Tom Sawyer (Z-Trip Remix)" track) (1997)

== Video games ==
- DJ Hero
- Skate

== Remixes ==
- Dead Weather "Treat me like your mother" (Z-Trip Remix Feat Slug of Atmosphere) available on iTunes
- Bassnectar "Cozza Frenzy"(Z-Trip Remix)avail on beatport.com
- Public Enemy vs Justice "Bring the Justice" (Z-Trip Remix) avail on DJ Hero Activision (2009)
- Beastie Boys Vs Queen "Brass Dust" (Z-Trip Remix) avail on DJ Hero Activison (2009)
- Jackson 5 "I want You Back" (Z-Trip remix) Motown remixed 2007, available on iTunes
- Rush: Tom Sawyer (Z-Trip Remix) (Short Version of the Remix) (1998) Small Soldiers Soundtrack, on iTunes
- Nirvana: Lounge Act (Z-Trip Remix)(2007) Skate VG Soundtrack, on iTunes
- Z-Trip & Run Run Run: Fade into You (Z-Trip Remix) (with Instrumental) (2006) Feast Soundtrack, on iTunes
- Z-Trip: M@shUptight (2007)
- Z-Trip: Smaller Babies (Z-Trip Remix) The Truth Campaign

== Proper mixtapes ==
- Z-Trip & Radar: Live @ Future Primitive Volume 2 (1998)
- Z-Trip: Mixed, Scratched, Tweaked & Abused
- Z-Trip: Urban Revolutions: The Future Primitive Sound Collective (1999)
- Z-Trip: Live in L.A. (2004)

== Promo mixtapes/EPs ==
- Z-Trip: Mixed, Scratched, Tweaked & Abused
- Z-Trip: Slow Motion
- Z-Trip: Urban Revolutions Megamix (1999)
- Z-Trip: The Unknown
- Z-Trip: The Motown Breakdown Part 1 (2004)
- Z-Trip: B-boy Breaks 3
- Z-Trip & DJ P: Uneasy Listening, Vol. 1
- Z-Trip & Emile: Best Friends (The Long Lost Bombshelter Mix CD) (1997)
- Z-Trip & Murs: The End of the Beginning Sampler Mix
- Z-Trip: Put a Tight Grip on Your Face
- Z-Trip: White Label 2007 (2007)

== Internet only mixes ==
- Z-Trip: Live on Power 106 FM - 8.6.06
- Z-Trip: Live in Seattle - WA, USA 10.21.00
- Z-Trip: Live on Groove Radio - Toronto, Canada 5.2.01
- Z-Trip: Live on Future Primitive Radio - San Fran, USA 5.18.01
- Z-Trip: Live on Dublab 02.25.00
- Z-Trip: Live @ Rootdown 02.24.00
- Z-Trip: Live @ Rootdown 2003 (aka, The Anti-War Mix; aka, Z-Trip: For Those About to Vote)
- Z-Trip: Live @ Baltic Room 11/17/01
- Z-Trip: Live @ WFNX Radio
- Z-Trip: Live UCLA 05.30.03
- Z-Trip: Live @ DjScene.com
- Z-Trip: Live @ Seattle Tasty Show 10/21/00
- Z-Trip: Live @ Scratch Movie Party
- Z-Trip: Live @ Bonnaroo Festival
- Z-Trip: Live @ Scratch Movie Party
- Z-Trip: Live @ Beta Lounge 05.18.01
- Z-Trip: Live @ The Fox Boulder 05.25.03
- Z-Trip & DJ P: Live @ The Last Supper Club - Seattle, USA 12.7.00
- Z-Trip & DJ P: Live on Groovetech
- Z-Trip & DJ Mel: Live @ Thursday Uprock, Austin, TX 11.08.01
- Z-Trip & Emile: Hip Hop Mix 02.12.99
- Z-Trip, Emile & Radar: Acid Reign
- Z-Trip: Obama Mix
- Z-Trip: Obama Mix part 2: Victory Lap

== Production ==
- LL Cool J: Whaddup (ft. Z-Trip, Tom Morello & Chuck D) (S-BRO Music Group/429 Records, 2013) (Production)
- Public Enemy: Most of My Heroes Still... (Enemy Records, 2012) (Production)
- Datsik & Z-Trip: Double Trouble (Dim Mak Records, 2012) (Production)
- Z-Trip & N.A.S.A.: The People Tree (ft. David Byrne, Chali 2na and Gift of Gab) (2008)
- Busta Rhymes - "Killin' Em " (ft. LL Cool J) (Additional Production, 2012)
- Z-Trip & N.A.S.A.: Money (ft. David Byrne, Chuck D, Ras Congo, Seu Jorge) (2008)
- Z-Trip & Rush: Tom Sawyer (Z-Trip Remix) (Full Version of the Remix) (2007)
- Z-Trip & Supernatural: Down Under Freestyle (2006)
- Z-Trip & Run Run Run: Fade Into You (Z-Trip Remix) (with Instrumental) (2006)
- Z-Trip & Murs: Kiss (Remix) (2006)
- Z-Trip: M@shUptight (2007)
- Beck - The Information (2006, Interscope Records) (Additional Production)
- Z-Trip & Galactic: Zed Tripplen (Live) (2003)
- Meat Beat Manifesto - What Does It All Mean? (2002, Run Recordings) (Additional Production)
- Meat Beat Manifesto - RUOK (2002, Run Recordings) (Additional Production)
- Z-Trip & Rush: Tom Sawyer (Z-Trip Remix) (Short Version of the Remix) (1998)
