= Work It Out (Jurassic 5 song) =

Single by Jurassic 5 featuring Dave Matthews Band

from the album Feedback
- B-side: "In the House"
- Released: July 11, 2006
- Recorded: 2005
- Genre: Alternative hip hop
- Length: 3:51
- Label: Interscope
- Songwriter(s): Carter Beauford; Dante Givens; Soup; Roland Kovac; Stefan Lessard; Dave Matthews; DJ Nu-Mark; Chali 2na; Marc Stuart; Boyd Tinsley

Jurassic 5 singles chronology
"Canto De Ossanha" (2006)	"Work It Out" (2006)	"Customer Service" (2016)

Dave Matthews Band singles chronology
"Smooth Rider" (2006)	"Work It Out" (2006)	"Funny the Way It Is" (2009)

"Work It Out" is a song by hip hop group Jurassic 5 released as the third single from their fourth studio album Feedback . The track features Dave Matthews Band and vocals by lead singer Dave Matthews on the chorus. The song was later included on the soundtrack of basketball game NBA Live 07.

== Music video ==
The video for the song (directed by The Malloys) is a satirical parody of senior members of the U.S. government. The clip begins with a number of government-issue black SUVs screeching to a halt before Secret Service agents secure the area. A character similar in appearance to President George W. Bush then exits one of the SUVs and goes jogging around the town, wearing a grey singlet top and blue boxer shorts. The video mocks Bush's response to Hurricane Katrina as the character runs past a drinks stand marked "Disaster Relief," where he grabs a bottle of water and pours it all over himself. Rising fuel prices are also satirized, as the Bush character runs past a gas station, and sticks the number 10 over the original price of $3.07. The character then engages in an aerobics session with two other suit-wearing characters similar in appearances to Secretary of State Condoleezza Rice and Vice President Dick Cheney. The Cheney character is also depicted driving around the town on a segway, chasing young people away from an unemployment office into a military recruitment office, where a sign in the window reads "See Iraq!" Finally, Cheney's heart condition is mocked towards the end of the video when his character collapses and paramedics attempt to revive him using a defibrillator. Also parodied is NSA warrantless surveillance; the George W. Bush character tugging on the cord of a payphone, dragging an NSA agent out of the bushes behind the phone.

== Track listing ==
=== CD single ===
1. "Work It Out" (Radio edit)
2. "Work It Out" (Instrumental)

=== 12" single ===
==== A-side ====
1. "Work It Out" (DJ Saygın version)
2. "Work It Out" (Instrumental)
3. "Work It Out" (Acapella)

==== B-side ====
1. "In the House" (Main)
2. "In the House" (Instrumental)
3. "In the House" (Acapella)

== Chart performance ==
Chart (2006)	Peak position
UK Singles Chart	116
