= Axis of Justice: Concert Series Volume 1 =

Live album including DVD by Various Artists
- Released: November 16, 2004
- Length: 51:04
- Label: Columbia/Serjical Strike/Axis of Justice
- Producers: Serj Tankian, Tom Morello

Axis of Justice: Concert Series Volume 1 is a live CD/DVD by various artists in support of the Axis of Justice organization.

== Track listing ==
CD
No.	Title	Writer(s)	Length
1.	"Where the Streets Have No Name"	U2	5:08
2.	"(What's So Funny 'Bout) Peace, Love, and Understanding"	Nick Lowe	2:16
3.	"Alice in My Fantasies"	George Clinton Jr., Grace Cook	3:37
4.	"Piano Improvisation"	Serj Tankian	1:36
5.	"Charades"	Tankian, Daron Malakian	3:36
6.	"Until the End"	The Nightwatchman	4:16
7.	"I Feel Good Again"	Junior Kimbrough	3:35
8.	"Get Up, Stand Up"	Bob Marley, Peter Tosh	4:10
9.	"Union Song"	The Nightwatchman	2:58
10.	"(Free Jam)"	Flea, Brad Wilk, Tankian	2:14
11.	"What's Golden"	Dante Givens, Mark Postic, Charles Stewart, Courtney Henderson, Lucas MacFadden, Marc Stuart	3:05
12.	"Freedom"	Givens, Postic, Stewart, Henderson, MacFadden, Stuart, Julius Brookington	3:16
13.	"Speak on It"	Knowledge, Tankian	2:52
14.	"Chimes of Freedom"	Bob Dylan	5:51
15.	"Jeffrey Are You Listening?"	Tankian, Tom Morello, Wilk, Brian O'Connor	1:07

DVD
No.	Title	Writer(s)	Length
1.	"Airplane Skit"
2.	"President Evil" (Iraq Poem)	Knowledge
3.	"Speak on It" (Armenian Genocide Poem)	Knowledge, Tankian
4.	"Until the End"	The Nightwatchman
5.	"The Road I Must Travel"	The Nightwatchman
6.	"Piano Improvisation"	Tankian
7.	"Charades"	Tankian, Malakian
8.	"(Free Jam)" (No Lyrics)	Flea, Wilk, Tankian
9.	"Chimes of Freedom"	Dylan
10.	"Alice in My Fantasies"	Clinton Jr., Cook
11.	"Where the Streets Have No Name"	Bono, The Edge, U2

Additional DVD Bonus Footage
No.	Title	Writer(s)	Length
12.	"Bomb Day in Paris"	Wayne Kramer
13.	"5 Million Ways to Kill a CEO"	Boots Riley
14.	"Improvisational Noise"	Tankian
15.	"Get Up, Stand Up"	Marley, Tosh

Audio: (Excerpts from The Axis Of Justice radio network)

- Interview with Michael Moore
- Interview with Janeane Garofalo
- Rants and raves with Serj And Tom

== Personnel ==
=== CD ===
1. Where the Streets Have No Name

- Performed By:

Flea (Bass)
Brad Wilk (Drums)
Tom Morello (Acoustic Guitar)
Pete Yorn (Guitar/Vocals)
Tim Walker (Electric guitar)
Serj Tankian (Vocals)
Maynard James Keenan (Vocals)
Jonny Polonksy (Keyboards)

2. (What's So Funny 'Bout) Peace, Love and Understanding

- Performed By:

Chris Cornell
Maynard James Keenan

3. Alice in My Fantasies

- Performed By:

Flea (Bass)
Brad Wilk (Drums)
Tom Morello (Guitar)
Pete Yorn (Guitar)
Serj Tankian (Vocals)

4. Piano Improvisation

- Performed By:

Serj Tankian

5. Charades

- Performed By:

Serj Tankian (Vocals/Piano)

6. Until the End

- Performed By:

The Nightwatchman

7. I Feel Good Again

- Performed By:

Pete Yorn (Vocals/Guitar)
Simon Petty (Acoustic Guitar)
Tim Walker (Lead Guitar/Pedal Steel)
Malcolm Cross (Drums/Percussion/Piano)
Sid Jordan (Bass/Piano)
Joe Mora (Guitar)

8. Get Up, Stand Up

- Performed By:

Serj Tankian (Vocals)
Tom Morello (Guitar/Vocals)
Wayne Kramer (Guitar/Vocal)
Flea (Bass)
John Dolmayan (Drums)

9. Union Song

- Performed By:

The Nightwatchman

10. (Free Jam)

- Performed By:

Flea (Bass)
Brad Wilk (Drums)
Serj Tankian (Piano)

11. What's Golden

- Performed By:

Jurassic 5

12. Freedom

- Performed By:

Jurassic 5

13. Speak on It

- Performed By:

Knowledge
Serj Tankian

14. Chimes of Freedom

- Performed By:

Tom Morello (Guitar/Vocals)
Serj Tankian (Piano/Vocals)
Pete Yorn (Guitar/Vocals)
Flea (Bass)
Brad Wilk (Drums)

15. Jeffrey Are You Listening?

- Performed By:

Serj Tankian (Words/Melodica)
Tom Morello (Guitars)
Brad Wilk (Drums)
Brian O'Conner (Bass)

- Tracks 1, 3–7, 9–14 Recorded live at Axis Of Justice Concert Series at The Avalon, Hollywood, CA, by Howard Karp and assisted by Ronny Mikkelsen on 7/19/04
- Track 2 Recorded live @ Lollapalooza, Seattle, WA, on 8/23/03
- Track 8 Recorded live @ The Axis Of Justice Concert Series at The Troubadour, Hollywood, CA on 3/31/04 by Bobby Crown
- Track 15 Recorded at Serjical Strike Studios, 2004
- Produced By Serj Tankian
- All Audio Mixed by David Bianco
- Street Audio Mixed at Scream Studios, Studio City, CA except Tracks 2, 15 (Mixed at Mad Dog Studios, Burbank, CA)
- Assistant Engineer at Scream Studios: Alex "Odd Jobs" Uychocde
- 5.1 Audio Mixed at Mad Dog Studios, Burbank, CA
- Assistant Engineer at Mad Dog Studios: Rafael Serrano
- Mastered at Oasis Mastering, Studio City, CA
- Mastered by Eddy Schreyer
- Art Direction and Design by Brandy Flower
- Photograph by Jim Wright, Kevin Estrada, Hampig Koulayan, George Tonikian, Darren Doane

=== DVD ===
1. Airplane Skit

- Performed By:

Ahmed Ahmed (Spoken Word, Comedian)

2. President Evil

- Performed By:

Knowledge (Spoken Word)

3. Speak on It

- Performed By:

Knowledge (Spoken Word)
Serj Tankian (Piano)

4. Until the End

- Performed By:

The Nightwatchman

5. The Road I Must Travel

- Performed By:

The Nightwatchman (Acoustic Guitar/Vocals)
Serj Tankian (Piano)
Pete Yorn (Acoustic Guitar)
Brad Wilk (Drums)
Jonny Polonsky (Bass)

6. Piano Improvisation

- Performed By:

Serj Tankian

7. Charades

- Performed By:

Serj Tankian (Vocals/Piano)

8. (Free Jam)

- Performed By:

Flea (Bass)
Brad Wilk (Drums)
Serj Tankian (Piano)

9. Chimes of Freedom

- Performed By:

Tom Morello (Guitar/Vocals)
Serj Tankian (Piano/Vocals)
Pete Yorn (Guitar/Vocals)
Flea (Bass)
Brad Wilk (Drums)

10. Alice in My Fantasies

- Performed By:

Flea (Bass)
Brad Wilk (Drums)
Tom Morello (Guitar)
Pete Yorn (Guitar)
Serj Tankian (Vocals)

11. Where the Streets Have No Name

- Performed By:

Flea (Bass)
Brad Wilk (Drums)
Tom Morello (Acoustic Guitar)
Pete Yorn (Guitar/Vocals)
Tim Walker (Electric guitar)
Serj Tankian (Vocals)
Maynard James Keenan (Vocals)
Jonny Polonsky (Keyboards)

12. Bomb Day in Paris

- Performed By:

Wayne Kramer (Spoken Word and Guitar)
Flea (Bass)
John Dolmayan (Drums)

13. 5 Million Ways to Kill a CEO

- Performed By:

Boots Riley (Vocals)
Tom Morello (Acoustic Guitar)

14. Improvizational Noise

- Performed By:

Serj Tankian

15. Get Up, Stand Up

- Performed By:

Serj Tankian (Vocals)
Tom Morello (Guitar/Vocals)
Wayne Kramer (Guitar/Vocal)
Flea (Bass)
John Dolmayan (Drums)

- Recorded live at Axis Of Justice Concert Series at The Avalon, Hollywood, CA, on 7/19/04
- Bonus Footage Recorded Live at The Axis Of Justice Concert Series at the Troubadour, Hollywood on 3/31/04
- An XDOANEX Production
- Directed by J. Graf
- Produced by Darren Doane
- Executive Producers: Serj Tankian and Tom Morello
- DVD Design Billy Maddox II
