= Jurassic 5 (album) =

Studio album by Jurassic 5
- Released: June 1, 1998
- Genre: Hip-hop
- Length: 37:04
- Labels: Pan, PAN015CD
- Producers: Cut Chemist; DJ Nu-Mark

Jurassic 5 chronology
Jurassic 5 EP (1997)	Jurassic 5 (1998)	Quality Control (2000)

Professional ratings
Review scores
Source	Rating
The Guardian	4/5 stars
Muzik	5/5 stars
NME	8/10
Select	4/5

Jurassic 5 is the debut album by American hip-hop group Jurassic 5. This album contains all the songs from the Jurassic 5 EP plus a few additional tracks. Pan Records repackaged and released it as Jurassic 5 in 1998.

NME named it the 9th best album of 1998.

== Background ==
The correct title is Jurassic 5. However, in some listings, it is referred to wrongly as the Jurassic 5 LP, as "LP" confusingly appears on the album sleeve (including the CD version) artwork, which was used to distinguish it from the Jurassic 5 EP.

The Jurassic 5 logos on the album and the EP were designed by Chali 2na.

== Track listing ==
All tracks produced by DJ Nu-Mark and Cut Chemist.

Jurassic 5 track listing
No.	Title	Writer(s)	Length
1.	"In the Flesh"	Mark Potsic; Dante Givens; Marc Stuart; Charles Stewart; Courtenay Henderson; Lucas MacFadden	4:05
2.	"Quality Control Part II"	Potsic; MacFadden	0:39
3.	"Jayou"	Potsic; Givens; Stuart; Stewart; Henderson; MacFadden	2:58
4.	"Lesson 6: The Lecture"	MacFadden	5:32
5.	"Concrete Schoolyard"	Potsic; Givens; Stuart; Stewart; Henderson; MacFadden	5:21
6.	"Setup"	Potsic; MacFadden	0:30
7.	"Action Satisfaction"	Potsic; Givens; Stuart; Stewart; Henderson; MacFadden	3:58
8.	"Sausage Gut"	Potsic; MacFadden	0:19
9.	"Improvise"	Potsic; Givens; Stuart; Stewart; Henderson; MacFadden	3:43
10.	"Blacktop Beat"	MacFadden	1:25
11.	"Without a Doubt"	Potsic; Givens; Stuart; Stewart; Henderson; MacFadden	3:00
12.	"Lesson 6 (Reprise)"	MacFadden	1:39
13.	"Action Satisfaction" (Dub)	Potsic; MacFadden	3:55

The album is sometimes listed with a "Cuts and Scratches" track inserted before the last way.

== Charts ==
Chart performance for Jurassic 5
Chart (1998)	Peak position
UK Albums (Official Charts)	70
