= What's Golden =

Single by Jurassic 5

from the album Power in Numbers
- B-side: "High Fidelity"
- Released: 2002
- Recorded: 2000
- Genre: Hip hop
- Length: 3:09
- Label: Interscope
- Songwriters: James Boxley; Dante Givens; Soup; Cut Chemist; DJ Nu-Mark; Chuck D; Eric Sadler; Chali 2na; Marc Stuart

Jurassic 5 singles chronology
"The Influence" (2000)	"What's Golden / High Fidelity" (2002)	"Freedom / One of Them" (2002)

"What's Golden" is a song by American hip hop group Jurassic 5, from their third studio album, Power in Numbers. It features samples from Public Enemy's "Prophets of Rage" and Clive Hicks's "Look Hear".

The song was featured in the 2002 video game ATV Offroad Fury 2, 2025 video game skate., as well as in the 2016 video game Forza Horizon 3.

== Single track listing ==
All tracks are written by Jurassic 5.

No.	Title	Length
1.	"What's Golden"	3:09
2.	"High Fidelity"	3:07

== Music video ==
The music video shows the band members, along with many unknown people, dancing in a hip hop club. All these people are later shown in a variety of urban settings (such as a cornfield, a bus, a dark alley, and the inner city) with Chali 2na, Mark 7even, Akil, and Soup rapping, seemingly oblivious to these settings.

== Critical reception ==
Allmusic reviewer John Bush cited "What's Golden", along with "A Day at the Races" as "old-school anthems" among the darker songs elsewhere in the album.

== Charts ==
Chart (2002)	Peak position
US Hot R&B/Hip-Hop Songs (Billboard)	90
