= Feedback (Jurassic 5 album) =

Studio album by Jurassic 5
- Released: July 25, 2006
- Genre: Hip-hop
- Length: 58:28
- Label: Interscope
- Producers: DJ Nu-Mark; Salaam Remi; Scott Storch; Bean One; Exile

Jurassic 5 chronology
Power in Numbers (2002)	Feedback (2006)

Professional ratings
Aggregate scores
Source	Rating
Metacritic	57/100
Review scores
Source	Rating
AllMusic	3/5 stars
HipHopDX	3.5/5
Okayplayer	4/5 stars
Pitchfork	4.1/10
Rolling Stone	2.5/5 stars
XXL	3/5 stars

Feedback is the fourth studio album by American hip-hop group Jurassic 5. It was released on July 25, 2006. It is the only album the band released as a quintet, in the wake of Cut Chemist's departure earlier that year.

== Critical reception ==
At Metacritic, which assigns a weighted average score out of 100 to reviews from mainstream critics, Feedback received an average score of 57% based on 26 reviews, indicating "mixed or average reviews".

== Track listing ==
Feedback track listing
No.	Title	Writer(s)	Producer(s)	Length
1.	"Back 4 U"	Courtenay Henderson; Charles Stewart; Dante Givens; Mark Potsic; Marc Stuart; Anne Dudley; Trevor Horn; J. J. Jeczalik; Gary Langan; Paul Morley	DJ Nu-Mark	3:16
2.	"Radio"	Henderson; Stewart; Givens; Potsic; Stuart; Salaam Remi Gibbs; Barry Bailey; George Belton; Darryl Calloway; Charles Fleming; Larry Miller; Reginald Payne	Salaam Remi	3:51
3.	"Brown Girl (Suga Plum)" (featuring Brick & Lace)	Henderson; Stewart; Givens; Potsic; Stuart; Scott Storch; Franz Reuther	Scott Storch	3:44
4.	"Gotta Understand"	Henderson; Stewart; Givens; Potsic; Stuart; Calvin Stocker; Curtis Mayfield	Bean One	3:47
5.	"In the House"	Henderson; Stewart; Givens; Potsic; Stuart; Glenn Grainger	DJ Nu-Mark	4:54
6.	"Baby Please"	Henderson; Stewart; Givens; Potsic; Stuart; Aleksander Manfredi; Al Green; Mabon Hodges	Exile	3:26
7.	"Work It Out" (featuring Dave Matthews)	Henderson; Stewart; Givens; Potsic; Stuart; Dave Matthews; Roland Kovac	DJ Nu-Mark	3:51
8.	"Where We At" (featuring Mos Def)	Henderson; Stewart; Givens; Potsic; Stuart	DJ Nu-Mark	3:00
9.	"Get It Together"	Henderson; Stewart; Givens; Potsic; Stuart; Gibbs; Barrett Strong; Norman Whitfield	Salaam Remi	3:33
10.	"Future Sound"	Henderson; Stewart; Givens; Potsic; Stuart; Harry Nilsson	DJ Nu-Mark	3:12
11.	"J Resume (skit)"	Henderson; Stewart; Givens; Potsic; Stuart	DJ Nu-Mark	0:38
12.	"Red Hot"	Henderson; Stewart; Givens; Potsic; Stuart; Kenny Gonzalez; Bosco Mann	DJ Nu-Mark	3:43
13.	"Turn It Out"	Henderson; Stewart; Givens; Potsic; Stuart	DJ Nu-Mark	3:17
14.	"End Up Like This"	Henderson; Stewart; Givens; Potsic; Stuart; Gibbs; Marvin Gaye; Anna Gordy Gaye; James Nyx Jr.; Elgie Stover	Salaam Remi	3:57
15.	"Canto De Ossanha"	Baden Powell; Vinicius de Moraes	DJ Nu-Mark	4:19

The UK special edition version of the album also contains a bonus track, "A Day at the Races" (Live at Brixton Academy). Another UK edition contains "What's Golden", also recorded at Brixton Academy.

Sample credits

- "Back 4 U" contains a sample of "Beat Box"; written by Anne Dudley, Trevor Horn, J. J. Jeczalik, Gary Langan, and Paul Morley; as performed by Art of Noise.
- "Radio" contains elements from "On the Radio", written by Barry Bailey, George Belton, Darryl Calloway, Charles Fleming, Larry Miller, and Reginald Payne.
- "Brown Girl (Suga Plum)" contains elements from "Brown Girl in the Ring", written by Franz Reuther.
- "Gotta Understand" contains a sample of "Mr. Welfare Man", written and performed by Curtis Mayfield.
- "In the House" contains a sample of "Shine Your Light", written by Glenn Grainger, as performed by the Graingers.
- "Baby Please" contains a sample of "Love and Happiness", written by Al Green and Mabon Hodges, as performed by Al Green.
- "Work It Out" contains a sample of "World Soul", written and performed by Roland Kovac.
- "Get It Together" contains a sample of "That's the Way Love Is", written by Barrett Strong and Norman Whitfield, as performed by Marvin Gaye.
- "Future Sound" contains a sample of "One", written by Harry Nilsson as performed by Three Dog Night.
- "Red Hot" contains a sample of "Nervous Like Me", written by Kenny Gonzalez and Bosco Mann, as performed by the Dap Kings.
- "End Up Like This" contains a sample of "Just to Keep You Satisfied"; written by Marvin Gaye, Anna Gordy Gaye, James Nyx Jr., and Elgie Stover; as performed by Marvin Gaye.

== Singles ==
Singles from Feedback
Title	Single information
"Red Hot"	Released: September 9, 2005; B-side:
"Canto De Ossanha"	Released: March 24, 2006; B-side: "Turn It Out"
"Work It Out"	Released: July 11, 2006; B-side: "In the House"

== Charts ==
Chart performance for Feedback
Chart (2006)	Peak position
Australian Albums (ARIA)	36
French Albums (SNEP)	136
New Zealand Albums (RMNZ)	39
Swiss Albums (Schweizer Hitparade)	25
UK Albums (Official Charts)	59
US Billboard 200	15
US Top R&B/Hip-Hop Albums (Billboard)	12
US Top Rap Albums (Billboard)	6
US Indie Store Album Sales (Billboard)	4
