= Keith Schofield =

American director

- Born: Los Angeles, California, U.S.
- Occupation: Director
- Years active: 2004–present
- Known for: Music videos, Television commercials
- Awards: Best Rock Video, UK Music Video Awards (2008); Silver, British Television Advertising Awards (2009); Gold Lion, Cannes Lions (2009)
- Website: keithschofield.com

Keith Schofield is an American director of music video and television commercials based in Los Angeles, California.

Schofield received the "Best Rock Video" award at the 2008 UK Music Video Awards, for his direction of Supergrass's "Bad Blood" video. Schofield's works have been described by Anthem Magazine as "sensations that regale viewers with a joyous vitality" and by Wired as incorporating "visual gags worthy of Chuck Jones."

In addition to music videos, Schofield has directed commercials for Virgin Mobile and Jennie O. The viral video Schofield directed for Diesel entitled "Diesel SFW XXX", comically altered archive porn footage, won a Silver at the 2009 British Television Advertising Awards and a Gold Lion at Cannes Lions 2009.

Schofield is currently working on his feature-length debut, Not Safe for Life, set to begin filming on March 18, 2026 in Bulgaria.

== Music videos ==
Year	Artist	Song title
2004	The Notwist	"One with the Freaks"
2005	DJ Format (feat. Abdominal and D-Sisive)	"3 Feet Deep"
2005	One Block Radius	"Loud and Clear"
2005	Hard 'N Phirm	"π"
2006	Death Cab for Cutie	"Jealousy Rides With Me"
2006	Wintergreen	"When I Wake Up"
2006	Goose	"British Mode"
2007	Minus the Bear	"Knights"
2007	Wintergreen	"Can't Sit Still"
2008	Supergrass	"Bad Blood"
2008	The Brighton Port Authority (feat. David Byrne & Dizzee Rascal)	"Toe Jam"
2008	Ladyhawke	"Dusk Till Dawn"
2008	The Ting Tings	"Be the One"
2008	CSS	"Move"
2009	MIMS	"Move (If You Wanna)"
2009	Lenny Kravitz	"Let Love Rule (Justice Remix)"
2009	Charlotte Gainsbourg (feat. Beck)	"Heaven Can Wait"
2010	David Guetta (feat. Kid Cudi)	"Memories"
2010	Chromeo	"Don't Turn the Lights On"
2011	Cut Copy	"Need You Now"
2011	Duck Sauce	"Big Bad Wolf"
2012	Electric Guest	"This Head I Hold"
2013	Darwin Deez	"You Can't Be My Girl"
2015	Joywave	"Somebody New"
2016	Jacob Plant (feat. Stylo G)	"Bike Engine"
2020	Duck Sauce	"Mesmerize"
