= Power in Numbers =

Studio album by Jurassic 5
- Released: October 8, 2002
- Genre: Alternative hip-hop
- Length: 56:11
- Label: Interscope
- Producers: Cut Chemist; DJ Nu-Mark; Juju; Sa-Ra Creative Partners

Jurassic 5 chronology
Quality Control (2000)	Power in Numbers (2002)	Feedback (2006)

Alternative cover
- Re-issue cover

Power in Numbers is the third studio album by American hip-hop group Jurassic 5, released on October 8, 2002, by Interscope Records.

== Musical style ==
Power in Numbers picks up where their previous album, Quality Control "left off", with a short double bass sample playing the same riff that the last song on Quality Control, "Swing Set", ended with.

The album features a number of differing song styles. One track, "React", composed by Jurassic 5 DJ Cut Chemist, is sample-based and contains no raps. "A Day at the Races" is based around a sample of David Axelrod's "Urizen" from the album Song of Innocence. "Acetate Prophets" has the same structure, but is much longer and also features production from Jurassic 5's other DJ, DJ Nu-Mark. Many tracks start or end with a sample of speech, usually inserted by Cut Chemist. The track "DDT" is an a cappella track rapped by renowned underground emcee Kool Keith, featuring no raps by Jurassic 5 themselves.

== Release ==
The album later had a limited re-release, which came with an accompanying DVD. The DVD consists of three featurettes on the group, one of which is a live performance. The UK version of this re-release also included an additional track on the CD, an alternative version of the track "Thin Line", featuring Mýa in place of Nelly Furtado.

== Critical reception ==
Professional ratings
Aggregate scores
Source	Rating
Metacritic	76/100
Review scores
Source	Rating
AllMusic	4/5 stars
Drowned in Sound	8/10
Entertainment Weekly	B−
The Guardian	5/5 stars
Los Angeles Times	3/4 stars
Pitchfork	7.1/10
Q	4/5 stars
Resident Advisor	4.5/5
Rolling Stone	3/5 stars
Spin	7/10

At Metacritic, which assigns a weighted average score out of 100 to reviews from mainstream critics, Power in Numbers received an average score of 76% based on 20 reviews, indicating "generally favorable reviews".

The album was also included in the book 1001 Albums You Must Hear Before You Die.

== Track listing ==
Power in Numbers track listing
No.	Title	Writer(s)	Producer(s)	Length
1.	"This Is"	Dante Givens; Mark Potsic; Charles Stewart; Courtenay Henderson; Lucas Macfadden; Marc Stuart	Cut Chemist	0:53
2.	"Freedom"	Givens; Potsic; Stewart; Henderson; Macfadden; Stuart	DJ Nu-Mark	3:19
3.	"If You Only Knew"	Givens; Potsic; Stewart; Henderson; Macfadden; Stuart	Juju	3:51
4.	"Break"	Givens; Potsic; Stewart; Henderson; Macfadden; Stuart; Ernest Burt; Michael Franklin	Cut Chemist	3:16
5.	"React"	Givens; Potsic; Stewart; Henderson; Macfadden; Stuart	Cut Chemist	0:56
6.	"A Day at the Races" (featuring Percee P and Big Daddy Kane)	Givens; Potsic; Stewart; Henderson; Macfadden; Stuart; Antonio Hardy; John Percy Simon; David Axelrod	Cut Chemist	4:02
7.	"Remember His Name"	Givens; Potsic; Stewart; Henderson; Macfadden; Stuart	DJ Nu-Mark	3:44
8.	"What's Golden"	Givens; Potsic; Stewart; Henderson; Macfadden; Stuart	DJ Nu-Mark	3:09
9.	"Thin Line" (featuring Nelly Furtado)	Givens; Potsic; Stewart; Henderson; Macfadden; Stuart; Nelly Furtado; Charles Stepney; Richard Rudolph	Cut Chemist	4:45
10.	"After School Special"	Givens; Potsic; Stewart; Henderson; Macfadden; Stuart	DJ Nu-Mark	2:41
11.	"High Fidelity"	Givens; Potsic; Stewart; Henderson; Macfadden; Stuart	DJ Nu-Mark	3:07
12.	"Sum of Us"	Givens; Potsic; Stewart; Henderson; Macfadden; Stuart	DJ Nu-Mark	3:28
13.	"DDT" (featuring Kool Keith)			0:42
14.	"One of Them" (featuring Juju)	Givens; Potsic; Stewart; Henderson; Macfadden; Stuart	Juju	3:18
15.	"Hey"	Givens; Potsic; Stewart; Henderson; Macfadden; Stuart; Shafiq Husayn; Om'Mas Keith; Taz Arnold	Sa-Ra Creative Partners	4:25
16.	"I Am Somebody"	Givens; Potsic; Stewart; Henderson; Macfadden; Stuart; Kenneth Gamble; Leon Huff; Roland Chambers	Cut Chemist	4:05
17.	"Acetate Prophets"	Givens; Potsic; Stewart; Henderson; Macfadden; Stuart	Cut Chemist, DJ Nu-Mark	6:31

Sample credits

- "Freedom" contains samples from "This Feeling", written and performed by Julius Brockington.
- "Break" contains elements from "Love to Hate", written by Ernest Burt and Michael Franklin, and performed by Freddie North.
- "A Day at the Races" contains excerpts from "Urizen", written and performed by David Axelrod.
- "What's Golden" contains elements from "Prophets of Rage"; written by Carlton Ridenhour, Hank Shocklee, and Eric Sadler; and performed by Public Enemy.
- "Thin Line" contains elements from "Les Fleurs", written by Charles Stepney and Richard Rudolph, and performed by Minnie Riperton.
- "After School Special" contains samples from "Ben" written by Bill Cosby and Stu Gardner, and performed by Bill Cosby.
- "I Am Somebody" contains elements from "Love in Them There Hills", written by Kenneth Gamble, Leon Huff, and Roland Chambers.
- "Acetate Prophets" contains samples from "Golden Scarab", written and performed by Ray Manzarek.

== Singles ==
Singles from Power in Numbers
Title	Single information
"What's Golden"	Released: October 22, 2002; B-side: "High Fidelity"
"If You Only Knew"	Released: November 25, 2003 (Australia only); B-side: "Quality Control" (Live), "Concrete Schoolyard" (Live), "If You Only Knew" (Live)
"Freedom"	Released: December 2, 2003; B-side: "One of Them"
"Hey"	Released: January 27, 2004; B-side: "If You Only Knew"

== Chart positions ==
=== Weekly charts ===
Weekly chart performance for Power in Numbers
Chart (2002)	Peak position
Australian Albums (ARIA)	16
New Zealand Albums (RMNZ)	22
Swiss Albums (Schweizer Hitparade)	96
UK Albums (Official Charts)	46
US Billboard 200	15
US Top R&B/Hip-Hop Albums (Billboard)	13

=== Year-end charts ===
Year-end chart performance for Power in Numbers
Chart (2002)	Position
Canadian R&B Albums (Nielsen SoundScan)	82
Canadian Rap Albums (Nielsen SoundScan)	43

== Certifications ==
Certifications for Power in Numbers
Region	Certification	Certified units/sales
United Kingdom (BPI)	Gold	100,000^{‡}
^{‡} Sales+streaming figures based on certification alone.
