= Quality Control (album) =

Studio album by Jurassic 5
- Released: June 6, 2000
- Genre: Alternative hip-hop
- Length: 53:36
- Label: Interscope
- Producers: Cut Chemist; DJ Nu-Mark; Shafiq Husayn

Jurassic 5 chronology
Jurassic 5 (1998)	Quality Control (2000)	Power in Numbers (2002)

Singles from Quality Control
- 1. "W.O.E. Is Me (World of Entertainment)" Released: 2000; 2. "Quality Control" Released: 2000

Quality Control is the second studio album by American alternative hip-hop group Jurassic 5. It was released on June 6, 2000, by Interscope Records.

== Critical reception ==
Professional ratings
Aggregate scores
Source	Rating
Metacritic	77/100
Review scores
Source	Rating
AllMusic	5/5 stars
Entertainment Weekly	B
The Guardian	4/5 stars
The Independent	4/5 stars
Los Angeles Times	3.5/4 stars
Mixmag	4/5
NME	6/10
Pitchfork	6.1/10
Rolling Stone	3.5/5 stars
The Source	3.5/5 stars

At Metacritic, which assigns a normalized rating out of 100 to reviews from professional publications, Quality Control received an average score of 77 based on 17 reviews, indicating "generally favorable reviews".

In 2015, it was included in Paste's list of "10 Hip-Hop Albums for People Who Don't Like Hip-Hop".

== Track listing ==
Quality Control track listing
No.	Title	Writer(s)	Producer(s)	Length
1.	"How We Get Along"	Dante Givens; Mark Potsic; Charles Stewart; Courtenay Henderson; Lucas Macfadden; Marc Stuart	DJ Nu-Mark	1:14
2.	"The Influence"	Givens; Potsic; Stewart; Henderson; Macfadden; Stuart; Marty Paich	DJ Nu-Mark	3:56
3.	"Great Expectations"	Givens; Potsic; Stewart; Henderson; Macfadden; Stuart; Larry Coryell	DJ Nu-Mark; Cut Chemist (co.)	3:37
4.	"Quality Control (Intro)"	Givens; Potsic; Stewart; Henderson; Macfadden; Stuart	Cut Chemist	0:31
5.	"Quality Control"	Givens; Potsic; Stewart; Henderson; Macfadden; Stuart; Clarence Reid	Cut Chemist	4:48
6.	"Contact"	Givens; Potsic; Stewart; Henderson; Macfadden; Stuart	Cut Chemist	1:15
7.	"LAUSD"	Givens; Potsic; Stewart; Henderson; Macfadden; Stuart; Willie Dixon	Cut Chemist	4:07
8.	"W.O.E. Is Me (World of Entertainment)"	Givens; Potsic; Stewart; Henderson; Macfadden; Stuart; Thomas Clausen	DJ Nu-Mark	3:57
9.	"Monkey Bars"	Givens; Potsic; Stewart; Henderson; Macfadden; Stuart; Tony Maiden; Yvette Stevens; Bobby Watson	DJ Nu-Mark	4:06
10.	"Jurass Finish First"	Givens; Potsic; Stewart; Henderson; Macfadden; Stuart; Shelly Manne	DJ Nu-Mark	4:35
11.	"Contribution"	Givens; Stewart; Henderson; Stuart; Shafiq Husayn; Potsic; Macfadden	Shafiq Husayn	3:45
12.	"Twelve"	Givens; Stewart; Henderson; Stuart; Husayn; Potsic; Macfadden	Shafiq Husayn	4:25
13.	"The Game"	Givens; Potsic; Stewart; Henderson; Macfadden; Stuart; David Porter; Isaac Hayes	Cut Chemist; DJ Nu-Mark (co.)	4:34
14.	"Improvise"	Givens; Potsic; Stewart; Henderson; Macfadden; Stuart; Quincy Jones	DJ Nu-Mark	3:28
15.	"Swing Set"	Givens; Potsic; Stewart; Henderson; Macfadden; Stuart; Ray Bauduc; Bob Haggart; Bob Crosby; Gil Rodin	Cut Chemist; DJ Nu-Mark	5:18

Sample credits

- "The Influence" contains excerpts from "Some Minor Changes", written by Marty Paich and performed by The Hi-Lo's.
- "Great Expectations" contains interpolations from "The Great Escape", written by Larry Coryell.
- "Quality Control" contains samples from "One Less Dick" and "Second Show", written by Clarence Reid, and performed by Blowfly.
- "Contact" contains vocal samples from "(Do the) Push and Pull", performed by Rufus Thomas.
- "LAUSD" contains samples from "I Just Want to Make Love to You", written by Willie Dixon, and performed by Cold Blood.
- "W.O.E. Is Me (World of Entertainment)" contains "Bio Rhythm #9", written by Thomas Clausen
- Intro preceding "W.O.E. Is Me" contains excerpts from "Movin' On Up" (Theme from The Jeffersons), written by Ja'Net DuBois and Jeff Barry.
- "Monkey Bars" contains a sample from "Somebody's Watching You"; written by Tony Maiden, Yvette Stevens, and Bobby Watson; performed by Rufus featuring Chaka Khan.
- "Jurass Finish First" contains samples from "Flip", written and performed by Shelly Manne.
- "The Game" contains excerpts from "Soul Man", written by David Porter and Isaac Hayes.
- Improvise" contains a sample from "The Hot Rock", written and performed by Quincy Jones.
- "Swing Set" contains excerpts from "Big Noise from Winnetka", written by Ray Bauduc, Bob Haggart, Bob Crosby, and Gil Rodin; and performed by Sandy Nelson.
- "Swing Set" contains excerpts from the soundtrack album Animal House.

== Charts ==
Chart performance for Quality Control
Chart (2000)	Peak position
Australian Albums (ARIA)	69
Canada Top Albums/CDs (RPM)	51
Scottish Albums (Official Charts)	23
Swedish Albums (Sverigetopplistan)	37
UK Albums (Official Charts)	23
UK Dance Albums (OCC)	2
US Billboard 200	43
US Top R&B/Hip-Hop Albums (Billboard)	33

== Certifications ==
Certifications for Quality Control
Region	Certification	Certified units/sales
United Kingdom (BPI)	Gold	100,000^{‡}
^{‡} Sales+streaming figures based on certification alone.
