= Music for the Mature B-Boy =

Studio album by DJ Format
- Released: 25 March 2003
- Genre: Hip hop
- Length: 45:38
- Label: Genuine
- Producer: DJ Format

DJ Format chronology
Music for the Mature B-Boy (2003)	If You Can't Join 'Em… Beat 'Em (2005)

Music for the Mature B-Boy is the first studio album by DJ Format.

== Track listing ==
1. "Intro
2. "Ill Culinary Behaviour" (featuring Abdominal)
3. "We Know Something You Don't Know" (featuring Chali 2na & Akil)
4. "Last Bongo In Brighton (Remix)"
5. "The Hit Song" (featuring Abdominal)
6. "Here Comes The Fuzz"
7. "B-Boy Code Pt.2" (featuring Fatski)
8. "Vicious Battle Raps" (featuring Abdominal)
9. "Charity Shop Sound Clash" (featuring Aspects)
10. "Little Bit Of Soul"
11. "English Lesson (Remix)"

== Singles ==
UK singles with release dates:

- "We Know Something You Don't Know" (10 March 2003)
- "The Hit Song" (23 June 2003)
- "Vicious Battle Raps" (27 October 2003)
