= We Know Something You Don't Know =

Single by DJ Format (feat. Chali 2na & Akil)

from the album Music for the Mature B-Boy
- Released: 10 March 2003
- Genre: Hip Hop
- Length: 4:49
- Label: Genuine
- Songwriters: DJ Format, Chali 2na, Dante Givens

DJ Format (feat. Chali 2na & Akil) singles chronology
"We Know Something You Don't Know" (2003)	"The Hit Song" (2003)

"We Know Something You Don't Know" is a song from DJ Format's 2003 album Music for the Mature B-Boy. It was released as the first single from the album on 10 March 2003 and reached #73 in the UK Singles Chart.

== Track listing ==
1. "We Know Something You Don't Know" (feat. Chali 2na & Akil)
2. "Here Comes the Fuzz"
3. "As the Drums Pound" (feat. Abdominal)

== Music video ==
The five furry-costumed B-boys in the "We Know Something You Don't Know" video

The music video, directed by Ruben Fleischer, features five dancers cavorting around downtown Los Angeles and b-boying in cartoonish animal costumes.

=== Influence ===
The breakdancing animals became a bit of an internet phenomenon, spreading mostly through short animated gifs—despite the fact that few knew where they came from or the song they were associated with. In particular, a breakdancing sequence involving the dancer in the bear suit was parodied and redrawn many times with different characters in his place.

Another phenomenon involving the breakdancing animals is a looped flash video which was first posted on 4chan's /f/ board and then later adapted into a website, it uses the chorus of the song "Petit Love" by Smile.dk on repeat.

=== Trivia ===
- The animal costumes from this video were later used in a video for another DJ Format track, "The Hit Song." The song uses the line "more hits than Germans surfing fetish websites," as the camera pans out on a website depicting two men in 2na's Shark costume.
- The shark costume was used yet again in the video for the DJ Format song "Vicious Battle Raps." An unknown person wearing the costume can be seen dancing in the background towards the end of the video. The same costume, in a gray color, is used by Steveston-London Secondary School as their mascot.
