= Z-Trip =

American DJ and producer (born 1971)

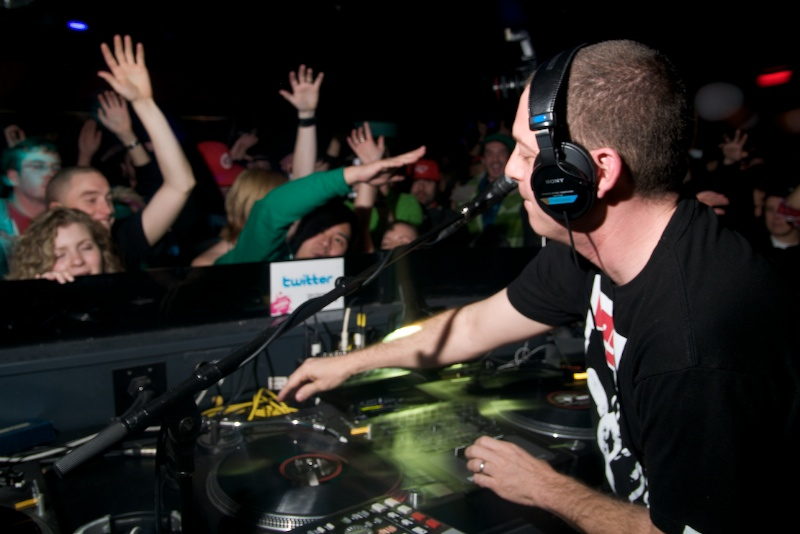
- Z-Trip performing in 2009

Background information
- Born: July 22, 1971 (age 55)
- Origin: Phoenix, Arizona, U.S.
- Genres: Hip-hop, rock, house
- Occupations: Producer, DJ, musician
- Instruments: Turntables, drums, sampler, 808 programming
- Years active: 1989–present
- Labels: Quannum Projects; Hollywood; Hard Left
- Website: www.djztrip.com

Zach Sciacca (born July 22, 1971), better known as DJ Z-Trip, is an American DJ and producer. He is a pioneer of the mashup movement.

He was the 2009 recipient of the "America's Best DJ Award". As a producer he has worked with artists across different genres including LL Cool J, Public Enemy, Kasabian and Dan the Automator. As of 2012, he has also been featured as LL Cool J's touring DJ. He collaborated with Talib Kweli on the mixtape Attack the Block. In 2012, Z-Trip launched a new mixer with Rane and Serato called the 62-Z.

== Life and career ==
Z-Trip was born in Queens, New York, then moved to Phoenix, Arizona, as a teen. He was known early in his career for performing with the Bombshelter DJs (along with Bombshelter's founder Emile Ananian and DJ Radar). He became widely known when his collaboration with DJ P, "Uneasy Listening, Vol. 1", was released in 2001. Only 1000 copies were made, but the album was soon distributed over the Internet in MP3 format. Uneasy Listening topped many critics' best album of year lists, including Rolling Stone, Spin, Entertainment Weekly, URB, the Los Angeles Times and New York Times. Since then, he has become well known worldwide for his sold-out shows and eclectic style, including headlining slots at the Coachella Valley Music and Arts Festival and an opening slot for the Rolling Stones. He was also a part of Operation MySpace, a concert scheduled for American troops stationed in Kuwait; this show was simulcast on MySpace and the FX cable channel.

His album Shifting Gears marked his major-label debut. Released on Hollywood Records in 2005, the album features guest artists Supernatural, Murs, Lyrics Born, Luke Sick, Aceyalone, Mystic, Prince Whipper Whip, Busdriver, Chester Bennington (from Linkin Park), Chuck D (from Public Enemy) and Soup and Chali 2na (from Jurassic 5). Shifting Gears received both critical and commercial acclaim. Rolling Stone gave the album four stars. It also charted 3 Top Ten Singles, in the U.S. As of August 2006, Z-Trip has left Hollywood Records.

Z-Trip also composed an original score for EA Games' release Skate. With his remix of "Lounge Act", he became the first and (as of July 2010) the only DJ to have a remix approved by Nirvana and Kurt Cobain's estate.

Z-Trip is featured in the 2001 documentary Scratch. His educational segment "How To Rock A Party" was placed in prominent rotation on MTV and placed as an extra on the Scratch DVD. He is also featured in 2005's Scratch, All The Way Live concert film alongside Mix Master Mike of the Beastie Boys.

In 2007, Z-Trip released an EP with MSTRKRFT entitled Soundclash of the Titans, which featured artwork by longtime Z-Trip friend and collaborator Shepard Fairey, of Obey Giant fame. In 2008, Z-Trip became politically motivated and did an album encouraging people to vote for Barack Obama entitled Party For Change, which was hailed as "great". After Obama's win, he created an album entitled Victory Lap that served as the soundtrack for the inauguration night parties around the world. Both albums were licensed under Creative Commons, made available for free download on the artist's website with cover art created by Fairey.

He performs with Serato Live as well as traditional vinyl, preferring to edit with Pro Tools. In 2013, Z-Trip collaborated with reggae artist Lee "Scratch" Perry on a remix of the Bob Marley track "Punky Reggae Party", which was made into a limited-edition pressing by Serato.

Z-Trip was voted America's Best DJ in 2009 by DJ Times Magazine and has placed in the competition's Top 10 every year since. Shortly after, he was named the #1 DJ in Club District's yearly "Top 10 DJ's in America" poll. In October 2009, Z-Trip became the headlining resident DJ of Rain Nightclub on Friday nights, located at the Palms Casino Resort in Las Vegas. As a part of this ongoing residency, entitled "Z-Trip's Revolution", he had multiple guests perform alongside him, including Too Short, De La Soul, Three Six Mafia, and Xzibit. The night was put on hiatus in late 2010 as Z-Trip began to work on his follow-up to Shifting Gears.

2011 marked the beginning of Z-Trip's collaboration with hip-hop icon LL Cool J with performances at the South by Southwest Festival and a special guest appearance by the rapper during Z-Trip's headlining set at the Hollywood Palladium, among others. The duo then embarked upon a multiple date tour entitled "Kings of the Mic," which saw them criss-cross the United States, joined by hip-hop artists including Public Enemy, Ice Cube and De La Soul, which was heralded as "in-your-face and unfettered".

In 2012, Z-Trip collaborated with dubstep artist Datsik to produce the track 'Double Trouble,' featured on Datsik's first studio album, Vitamin D.

In 2023, Z-Trip performed with LL Cool J for New Year's Eve festivities during Dick Clark's New Year's Rockin' Eve on 31 December 2023.

== Production discography ==
Remixes

- Bob Marley – "Punky Reggae Party (Z-Trip Remix ft. Lee Scratch Perry)" (2013, Island Records)
- will.i.am – T.H.E. Feat Mick Jagger, Wolfgang Gartner (Z-Trip Remix) (2012, Interscope Records)
- Kasabian – "Days Are Forgotten" (Z-Trip Remix ft. LL Cool J) (2011)
- Beastie Boys – "Don't Play No Game That I Can't Win feat. Santigold (Z-Trip's Evil Twin Remix)" (2011)
- Daft Punk – "Derezzed" (Z-Trip's "Off The Grid" Remix) (2011)
- Far East Movement – "Rocketeer (DJ Z-Trip Afterburner Dub Remix)" (2011)
- Jared Evan – "I'm in Love With You (Z-Trip Remix)" (2011)
- Rye Rye ft. MIA – "Sunshine" (2011)
- Dead Weather "Treat Me Like Your Mother" (Z-Trip Remix Feat Slug of Atmosphere) (2010)
- Afrika Bambaataa and The Soul Sonic Force – "Planet Rock" mixed with The Crystal Method – "Busy Child (Still Busy After All These Years Remix)" avail on DJ Hero 2 Activision (2010)
- Missy Elliott – "Get Ur Freak On" Mixed With Dillinja and Skibadee – "Twist 'Em Out" avail on DJ Hero 2 Activision (2010)
- Murs vs Foreigner "DJ Hero" (Z-Trip Remix) avail on DJ Hero Activision (2010)
- Bassnectar "Cozza Frenzy" (Z-Trip Hellrazor Remix) (2009)
- Public Enemy vs Justice "Bring the Justice" (Z-Trip Remix) avail on DJ Hero Activision (2009)
- Beastie Boys Vs Queen "Brass Dust" (Z-Trip Remix) avail on DJ Hero Activision (2009)
- Z-Trip: Smaller Babies (Z-Trip's Banjo Breaks Remix) The Truth Campaign (2008)
- Nirvana: Lounge Act (Z-Trip Remix) (2007) Skate VG Soundtrack
- Jackson 5 "I Want You Back" (Z-Trip remix) Motown Remixed (2007)
- Z-Trip: M@shUptight (2007)
- Z-Trip & Run Run Run: Fade into You (Z-Trip Remix) (with Instrumental) (2006) Feast of Love Soundtrack
- DJ Shadow – Right Thing (Z-Trip "Set The Party Off Remix in Three Parts") (2004) (appears on The Private Repress, Island Records)
- Butthole Surfers – Shame of Life (Z-Trip Remix) (2001, Hollywood Records)
- Rush: Tom Sawyer (Z-Trip Remix) (Short Version of the Remix) (1998) Small Soldiers Soundtrack

Production

- LL Cool J: Whaddup (ft. Z-Trip, Tom Morello & Chuck D) (S-BRO Music Group/429 Records, 2013) (Production)
- Public Enemy: Most of My Heroes Still... (Enemy Records, 2012) (Production)
- Datsik & Z-Trip: Double Trouble (Dim Mak Records, 2012) (Production)
- Z-Trip & NASA: The People Tree (ft. David Byrne, Chali 2na and Gift of Gab) (2008)
- Busta Rhymes – "Killin' Em" (ft. LL Cool J) (Additional Production, 2012)
- Z-Trip & NASA: Money (ft. David Byrne, Chuck D, Ras Congo, Seu Jorge) (2008)
- Z-Trip & Rush: Tom Sawyer (Z-Trip Remix) (Full Version of the Remix) (2007)
- Z-Trip & Supernatural: Down Under Freestyle (2006)
- Z-Trip & Run Run Run: Fade Into You (Z-Trip Remix) (with Instrumental) (2006)
- Z-Trip & Murs: Kiss (Remix) (2006)
- Z-Trip: M@shUptight (2007)
- Beck – The Information (2006, Interscope Records) (Additional Production)
- Z-Trip & Galactic: Zed Tripplen (Live) (2003)
- Meat Beat Manifesto – What Does It All Mean? (2002, Run Recordings) (Additional Production)
- Meat Beat Manifesto – RUOK (2002, Run Recordings) (Additional Production)
- Z-Trip & Rush: Tom Sawyer (Z-Trip Remix) (Short Version of the Remix) (1998)
- Joey Valence & Brae – NO HANDS (2024

Albums

- Z-Trip & Talib Kweli: "Attack The Block" (2012)
- Z-Trip: "Victory Lap" (Hard Left Records) (2009)
- Z-Trip: "Party for Change" (Hard Left Records) (2008)
- Z-Trip & Lateef: Ahead of the Curve Quannum Projects (2007)
- Z-Trip: Shifting Gears (Hollywood Records) (2005)
- Z-Trip: Uneasy Listening, Vol. 1 (Independent release in collaboration with DJ P) (1999)

EPs

- Z-Trip & MSTRKRFT: Soundclash of the Titans (2007) Album Art by Shepard Fairey
- Z-Trip: Listen to the DJ 12-inch (feat. Soup of Jurassic 5) (2005, Hollywood Records)
- Z-Trip: Shock and Awe 12-inch (feat. Chuck D of Public Enemy) (2005, Hollywood Records)
- Z-Trip: Breakfast Club 10-inch (feat. Murs and Supernatural) (2005, Hard Left Records)
- Z-Trip & Space Travelers: Black Hole / Further Explorations into the Black Hole 12-inch (2000, Future Primitive Sound)
- Z-Trip: Rhythmic Metaphor 12-inch (release year unknown, Ubiquity Records)

Soundtracks

- Z-Trip: Sound & Vision (2012)
- Z-Trip: All Pro (Production) (2007, Decon Records)
- Various Artists: skate. (Soundtrack) (Composer) (2007)
- Z-Trip & Garron Chang: Infamy (Movie Theme) (composer) (2006)
- Various Artists: Small Soldiers (Soundtrack) ("Tom Sawyer (Z-Trip Remix)" track) (1997)

== Video game projects ==
- DJ Hero 2 (2010)
- EA Sports MMA (2010)
- DJ Hero (2009)
- All Pro Football 2K8
- Skate (2007)
- XIII Soundtrack (2003, Future Primitive Sound / Ubisoft)
