= William Hundley =

American photographer (born 1976)

William Hundley (born 1976) is an American artist born in St. Paul, Minnesota, who lives and works in Austin, Texas.

In 2006 he began an ongoing series of photographs that he titled "Entoptic Phenomena" in which he photographs people jumping underneath fabrics and other various materials. The instant of the jump can be thought of as super ephemeral sculpture, lasting only a few seconds before reverting to their base components. The resulting photographs appear to have been made by computer manipulation, but Hundley stresses that "they are just photographs" and that there were absolutely no computer applications used in creating the images. He goes on to say that having "acrobatic models" is the key to the success of the imagery. A few of his "Entoptic Phenomena" photographs were featured in the 2007 Texas Biennial in which he was awarded the Juror's Choice Award.

In 2008 he started a new series of photographs "w/ cheeseburgers" that went on to become wildly popular or "viral" on the internet, primarily due to the photograph "Chihuahua on Cheeseburgers".

Another series of photographs, entitled "Little Naked Person Storage", consists of photographs of naked people hiding in various places around the average American household.

In an article on Sight Unseen, Hundley is quoted as saying, "My work started with the influence of Erwin Wurm and Maurizio Cattelan, these absurdists. I love the practical-joke nature of it; if I can make humor and beautiful aesthetics come together, that's the biggest powerhouse I can imagine."

His photography has been featured in numerous publications and countless blogs and websites. In 2007 Hundley was nominated for Best Artist in the Austin Critics Table Awards.

Though not initially mentioned in the credits, a few of his ideas were re-created in the music video "Heaven Can Wait" by Charlotte Gainsbourg featuring Beck. Eventually the director, Keith Schofield, contacted Hundley to apologize for not crediting his work as "inspiration" for portions of the video.

Although most widely known for his photography, Hundley's work also includes sculptures and installation and has been exhibited across the US and in Berlin. Recent works have focused on assembled collages and a series of tribal inspired masks with the idea of gathering objects from contemporary culture and using them in a "tribal" way.

He recently contributed to the TEDx event in Austin, TX in February 2011.

In 2011, a Hundley photograph is to be published in Adbusters magazine and he will also have an exhibition at Show & Tell Gallery in Toronto, Canada.
