= Fish Outta Water =

Studio album by Chali 2na
- Released: June 23, 2009
- Genre: Hip hop
- Length: 53:47
- Label: Decon
- Producers: Bean One; DJ Babu; Vitamin D; Jake One; Emile; DJ Nu-Mark; FDNY; Scott Storch; Nick Fury; Stephen Marley; Justin "Nino" Poree

Chali 2na chronology
Fish Market (2004)	Fish Outta Water (2009)	Fish Market Part 2 (2010)

Singles from Fish Outta Water
- 1. "International" / "Controlled Coincidence" Released: 2004

Fish Outta Water is the first solo studio album by Chali 2na, a front member of Jurassic 5. It was released on Decon in 2009. It features guest appearances from Talib Kweli, Anthony Hamilton, Beenie Man, Elzhi, and the Marley brothers Damian and Stephen. It peaked at number 44 on the Billboard Heatseekers Albums chart.

== Critical reception ==
Professional ratings
Aggregate scores
Source	Rating
Metacritic	70/100
Review scores
Source	Rating
HipHopDX	3.0/5
Now	4/5 stars
PopMatters	6/10 stars
RapReviews	8/10
The Skinny	4/5 stars
Spin	favorable

At Metacritic, which assigns a weighted average score out of 100 to reviews from mainstream critics, the album received an average score of 70, based on 7 reviews, indicating "generally favorable reviews".

Ryan Drever of The Skinny gave the album 4 stars out of 5, writing, "In a bid to assert himself as a strong, diverse talent all on his own, there are notable stylistic shifts peppered throughout these 15 cuts." Mosi Reeves of Spin stated that "Chali 2na uses his cavernous baritone as another resonant instrument in the mix, while his lyrics, which address police brutality ('Guns Up') and fatherhood ('Righteous Way'), lend subtext for deeper listening."

== Track listing ==
No.	Title	Producer(s)	Length
1.	"Get Focused"	Bean One	1:52
2.	"International" (feat. Beenie Man)	DJ Babu	3:32
3.	"So Crazy"	Vitamin D	4:00
4.	"Lock Shit Down" (feat. Talib Kweli)	Jake One	3:42
5.	"Don't Stop" (feat. Anthony Hamilton)	Emile	3:11
6.	"Keep Goin'" (feat. Choklate)	Jake One	3:49
7.	"Comin' Thru"	DJ Nu-Mark	3:30
8.	"F.O.W."	FDNY	2:09
9.	"Love's Gonna Getcha"	Scott Storch	3:54
10.	"Righteous Way"	Nick Fury	4:03
11.	"When Will I See You Again" (feat. Elzhi)	FDNY	3:48
12.	"Guns Up" (feat. Stephen Marley and Damian Marley)	Stephen Marley	4:53
13.	"Graff Time"	DJ Nu-Mark	3:01
14.	"Controlled Coincidence" (feat. Kanetic Source)	Justin "Nino" Poree	3:30
15.	"4 Be Be" (feat. Ming Xia)	Emile	4:52
Total length:			53:47

== Charts ==
Chart	Peak position
US Heatseekers Albums (Billboard)	44
