= Aspects (band) =

Hip hop band

- Origin: Bristol, England
- Genres: Hip hop
- Years active: 1996–present

Aspects are an English hip hop group from Bristol, England; the outfit's core members being emcees El Eye, Mantis and Bubber Loui.

== Career ==
The band formed in 1996 and were once part of a larger collective of artists known as FSH (Fantastic Super Heroes). Aspects, formerly Earthbound Aspects, were born of the Hip Hop movement in their native city and the culture's well documented renaissance at that time.

After a number of EPs, Aspects released their debut album Correct English to critical acclaim in 2001. The album featured the singles "Best Music" (also containing "Intrigue" remixed by DJ Vadim) and "My Genre." On its release "My Genre" became Single of the Week in the NME. The group gained international exposure with the song and the accompanying video was rotated on BBC Radio 1 in the UK and MTV Europe respectively. At this time the group appeared on and recorded exclusive radio sessions for Dan Greenpeace and Zane Lowe, Steve Lamacq, Tim Westwood and the late John Peel (see List of Peel sessions), among others. The title track and third official single, "Correct English" never appeared on the album but was released as a double A side (along with "We Get Fowl"). It is a collaborative track with Task Force. In 2007 Hip Hop Connection magazine (issue 214) ranked Aspects' Correct English No. 28 in the 50 Best British Albums Ever.

After the demise of their original stable, Hombre Records, Aspects were signed to Antidote Records (a subsidiary of Sanctuary Records), who released their sophomore LP Mystery Theatre? in 2004, along with singles for "Impact" and "Off The Lip". The latter entered the UK Indie Chart at No. 16 and the UK Top 200 at No. 81. "Off the Lip" is a "Surfin' USA" for the UK Hip Hop generation" according to a review published in The Independent, "making them one of only a handful of UK acts to produce genuinely original Hip Hop."

Their third studio album, Left Hand Path was released in 2013. It was described by Uncut as, "a masterful collage of gothic moods and virtuoso rhyming". Upon its release, Clash considered the material "a relieving alternative to conventional, safe music" and "playfully groundbreaking".

The group have performed extensively and were attached to UK tours from Princess Superstar, Arrested Development, De La Soul and The Bees. Aspects have recorded and collaborated with numerous artists, among them DJ Yoda, DJ Format, DJ Vadim, Junior Disprol, Hundred Strong, Mr. Jason of Porn Theatre Ushers, Si Begg, Quantic, The Bees and Little Barrie.

== Personnel ==
Members:

- El Eye (Ian Merchant), MC
- BeelziBubber Loucifur a.k.a. Bubber Loui (Alexander Parsons), MC
- Old Mantis a.k.a. Probe Mantis a.k.a. Leather Apron (Benjamin Weaver), MC
- The Printer's Devil a.k.a. Monkey Moo (Rory Donnelly), beatbox

Other founder/affiliate members:

- Specify (Ryan Jarrett), producer
- 7STU7 a.k.a. Stanley Matthews a.k.a. Big Stu (Stuart Matthews), engineer
- Nu Balance (Nick Burt), DJ
- Nick Fury (Scott McDougal), producer
- Salsa (Phil Rees), production, design and media
- Tech 12 (Ben Walters), tour manager, tour DJ

== Studio albums ==
2001: Correct English (2001, Hombré)
2004: Mystery Theatre? (2004, Antidote/Sanctuary)
2013: Left Hand Path (2013, Psycho Boogie)

== EPs ==
2012 EP (Hombré, 1998)
Revenge Of The Nerds (Hombré 1999)

== Singles ==
- "Sounds Of Earth" (Hombré 2000)
- "Best Music" (Hombré, 2001)
- "My Genre" (Hombré, 2001)
- "Psychoboogie" (White Label, 2001)
- "We Get Fowl/Correct English" (Hombré, 2001)
- "Impact" (Antidote, 2004)
- "Off The Lip" feat. The Bees (Antidote, 2004)
- "The Freedumb Song" (White Label, 2005)
- "BeaTTape" (White Label, 2012)

== Mixtapes ==
Rockrap (2005)
Kings' English (2013)

== See also ==
- Fabric Live 27
- Late Night Tales: Matt Helders
