= Abdominal (rapper) =

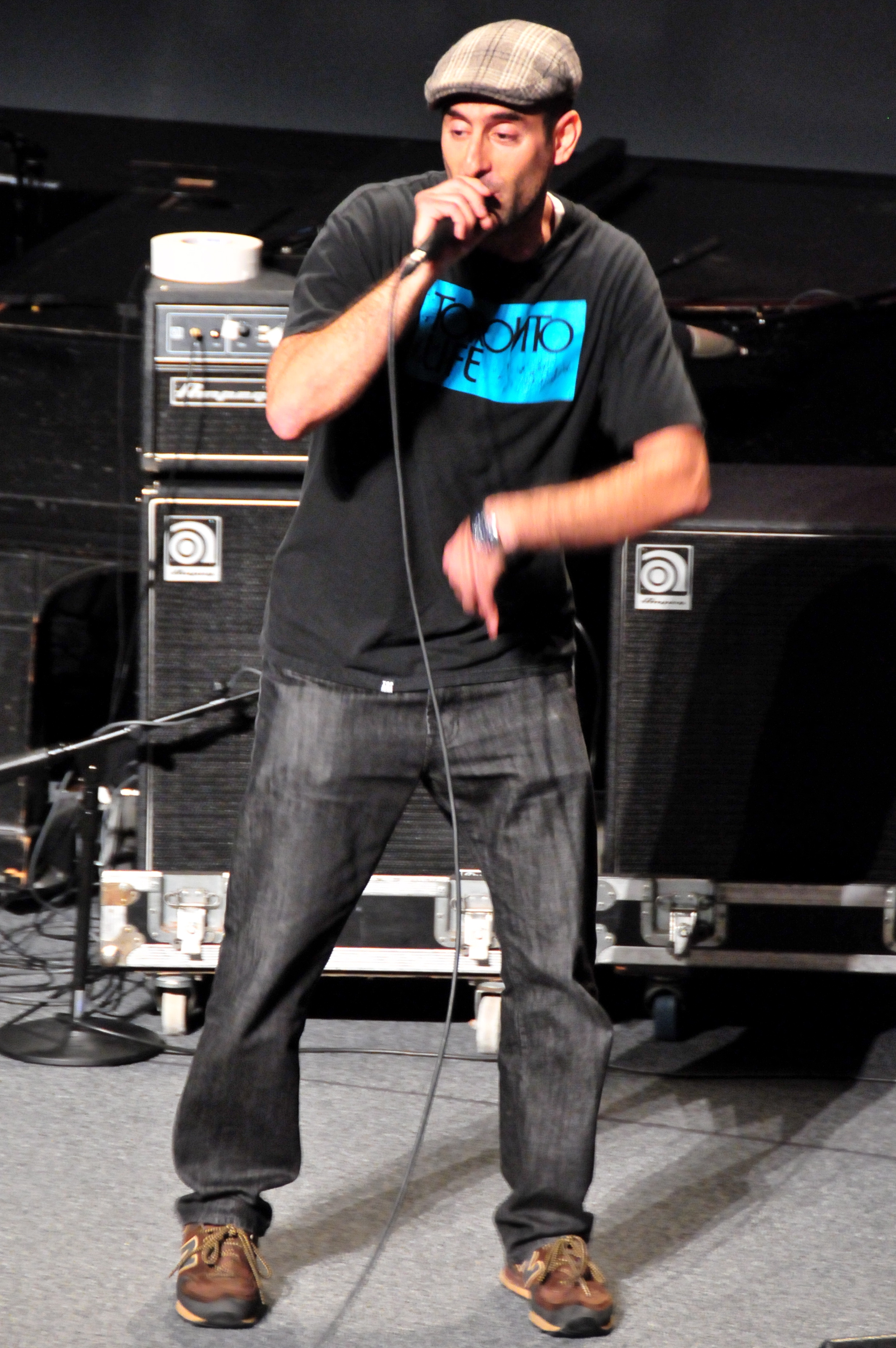
- Abdominal at the 2008 Poptech conference.

Background information
- Birth name: Andrew Bernstein
- Also known as: Abs
- Born: February 7, 1974 (age 51)
- Origin: Toronto, Ontario, Canada
- Genres: Hip hop
- Occupation: Rapper
- Years active: 1998–present
- Labels: Pinwheel Music; Antidote Records; Do Right! Music; Tuneup Productions
- Website: mcabdominal.com

Andrew Bernstein (born February 7, 1974), better known by his stage name Abdominal, is a Canadian rapper from Toronto, Ontario.

== Biography ==
Andy Bernstein grew up in Toronto and attended Northern Secondary School in the late 80s and early 90s, gaining a reputation there for his cartoons and graphic design work. Using the name Abdominal, he formed his first rap crew with DJ Serious and Scott C. called Rushholme and they started recording tracks. A chance meeting in 1998 with DJ Fase led to them teaming up as Abs & Fase. They began recording and released the limited single "Vinyl Frontier". This drew the attention of DJ Format and led to them collaborating. Abdominal's raps became a standout feature on DJ Format's first album, Music For the Mature B-Boy, released in 2003. From 2003 to 2005 they toured as part of Jurassic 5's European tour while in 2004 Abs and Fase released an album called Flowtation Device. Abdominal also appeared on DJ Format's second album, If You Can't Join 'Em... Beat 'Em, in 2005, alongside fellow Canadian rapper, D-Sisive.

His first solo album, Escape from the Pigeon Hole, was released in May 2007 in the United Kingdom by Antidote Records and features collaborations with DJ Format, Cut Chemist, DJ Fase, DJ Serious, Notes to Self, Circle Research, Young Einstein from hip-hop group Ugly Duckling and jazz musician Elizabeth Shepherd.

Aside from being a recording artist Abdominal also appears regularly at the Supermarket Club in Toronto hosting 'Do Right Saturdays' alongside DJ Fase and others from the Toronto hip hop scene.

In June 2007 Abdominal toured the UK with DJ Fase. During their performance at the Jazz Café in London, Abdominal & DJ Fase were joined by DJ Format onstage for a version of Format's song, "Ill Culinary Behaviour".

His song "Pedal Pusher", co-written with Rodney Pleasant, won the 2007 SOCAN Songwriting Prize, awarded for the best song in Canadian independent music by the Society of Composers, Authors and Music Publishers of Canada, as voted by the fans.

In 2008 he collaborated with UK duo Jellybass, on a track called "Transatlantic". Jellybass and Abdominal embarked on a mini-tour of the UK which featured a mixture of Jellybass live music, collaborative tracks and some Jellybass remixes of DJ Format/ Abdominal tracks.

In 2012 he released Sitting Music, credited to 'Abdominal and The Obliques'. The album features no sampling, relying solely on live instruments. The band toured the UK in early 2015.

In February 2015, Abdominal and his mother Sharon Singer traveled to Fort McMurray, AB, and became the first duo to present (and rap) on stage at TEDxFortMcMurray with "Courage: Why I Wrote a Rap Song with my Mom".

In late 2015 Abdominal and DJ Format reunited for a tour of the UK and also released two new tracks.

== Discography ==
Albums

- Ab Flex (1998)
- Flowtation Device (2001) (with DJ Fase)
- Escape from the Pigeon Hole (2007)
- Sitting Music (2012) (with The Obliques)
- Still Hungry (2017) (with DJ Format)

Remix albums

- Pedal Workout Remix EP (2009)
- Still Hungry: The Remixes (2017) (with DJ Format)

Live albums

- Freestyles Volume 1 (2005)
- Off the Top: Freestyles Volume 2 (2005)

Singles

- "The Vinyl Frontier / Fly Antics" (1999) (with DJ Fase)
- "A Good Day / Slow & Deliberate" (2004) (with DJ Fase)
- "Abdominal Workout" (2007)
- "Pedal Pusher" (2007)
- "The A-B-D" (2016) (with DJ 33 UK)
