= Jurassic 5 (EP) =

EP by Jurassic 5
- Released: October 13, 1997
- Genre: Hip-hop
- Length: 23:31
- Labels: Rumble Records, J0001, Interscope, INTD-90289
- Producers: Cut Chemist; DJ Nu-Mark

Jurassic 5 chronology
Jurassic 5 (1997)	Jurassic 5 (1998)

Professional ratings
Review scores
Source	Rating
AllMusic	4.5/5 stars
RapReviews	8.5/10
Rolling Stone	4/5 stars
The Rolling Stone Album Guide	4/5 stars
Spin	4/5 stars

Jurassic 5 is the first official release by American hip-hop group Jurassic 5. It is an EP that includes much of the material that would later appear on the full-length album Jurassic 5.

== Release ==
The first version of the EP to be released contained nine tracks and was available in CD single or double-12" single formats. It was released in October 1997 on the band's own short-lived label, Rumble Records.

Although the label only released one record, it did give the band a platform and allowed them to be heard.

"I urge every independent artist to put something out first. Prove yourself to yourself, to people that pick up the records, then the [labels] will come looking for you. If they know that you can score, they gonna pass the ball to you." — Akil

The band signed to a major label, Interscope Records, in 1999. Their first release on Interscope was the re-issue of the Jurassic 5 EP in an 8-track version in 1999. This had the same listing as the original EP, excluding the final track "Blacktop Beat".

== Track listing ==
No.	Title	Length
1.	"In the Flesh"	4:07
2.	"Quality Control Part II"	0:42
3.	"Jayou"	3:00
4.	"Lesson 6: The Lecture"	6:35
5.	"Concrete Schoolyard"	5:23
6.	"Setup"	0:32
7.	"Action Satisfaction"	4:00
8.	"Sausage Gut"	0:22
9.	"Blacktop Beat"	1:25
