= Ruben Fleischer =

American film director

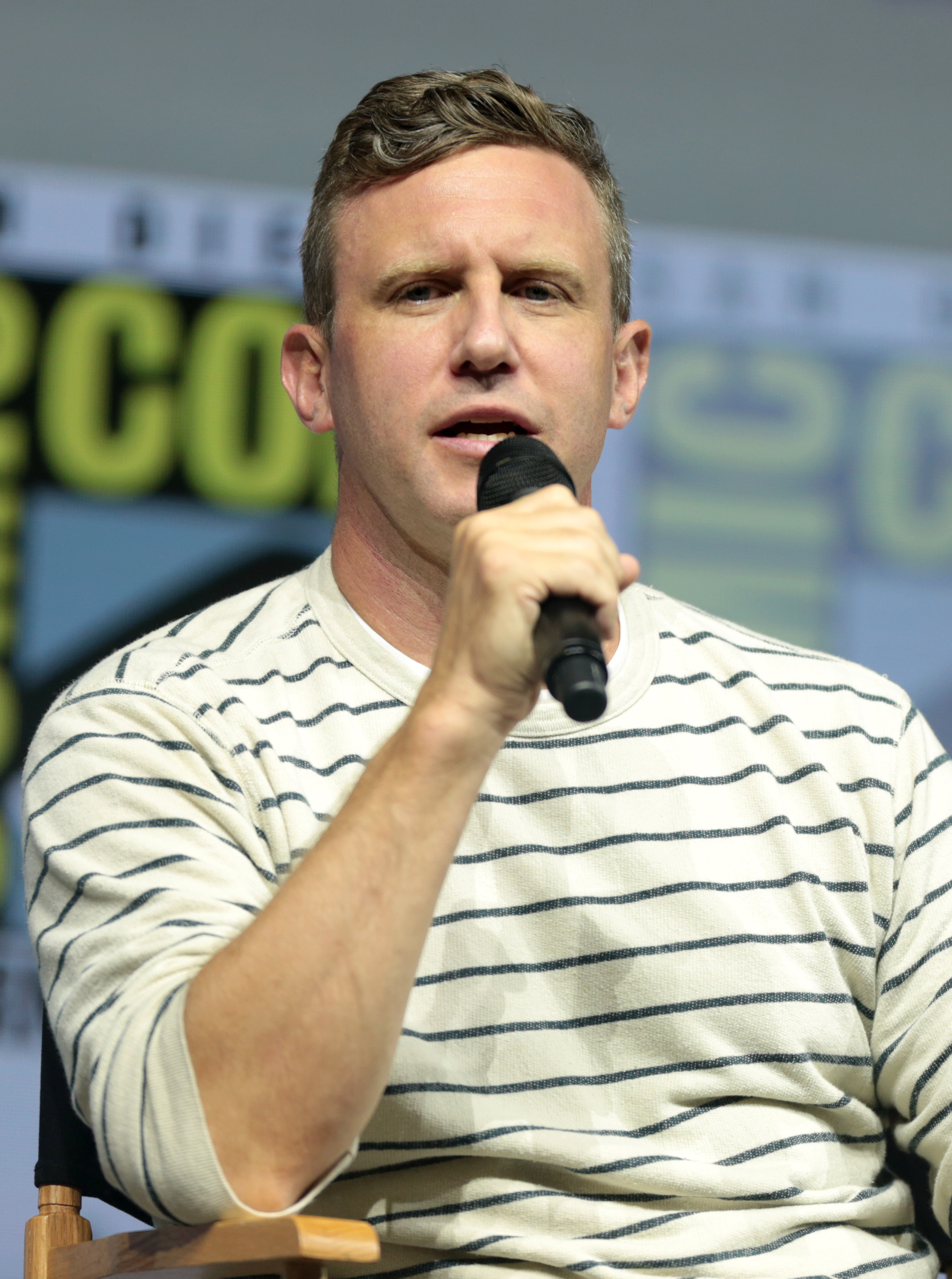
- Fleischer at the 2018 San Diego Comic-Con
- Born: Ruben Samuel Fleischer; October 31, 1974 (age 51); Washington, D.C., U.S.
- Education: Wesleyan University
- Occupations: Film director; film producer; television producer; music video director; commercial director
- Years active: 2000–present
- Spouse: Holly Shakoor (m. 2012)

Ruben Samuel Fleischer (/ˈflaɪʃər/; born October 31, 1974) is an American film director, film producer, television producer, music video director, and commercial director. He is best known as the director of Zombieland (2009), his first feature film, and its sequel Zombieland: Double Tap (2019). He has also directed the films 30 Minutes or Less, Gangster Squad, Uncharted, and 2018's Venom featuring the Marvel Comics character of the same name. Prior to features, he directed television commercials for such brands as Cisco, Eurostar, ESPN, and Burger King, and music videos for artists such as M.I.A., Electric Six, DJ Format and Gold Chains.

== Early life ==
Fleischer was born and raised in Washington, D.C, the son of Karen Lee (née Samuel) and David Elliot Fleischer, who is a physician at the Mayo Clinic in Arizona and a professor of medicine. His brother, Lucas, works in new media. His father was born to a Jewish family, while his mother converted to Judaism. Fleischer was raised in Reform Judaism.

After graduating with a major in history from Wesleyan University in Middletown, Connecticut, Fleischer moved to San Francisco, where he worked as a freelance HTML programmer, unsure what he wanted to do with his life.

== Career ==
Taking the advice of close friend Mike White (also a Wesleyan graduate), Fleischer worked as a PA in the writers' office of Dawson's Creek. After working as assistant to director Miguel Arteta, he eventually turned to directing and worked his way through the industry, tackling music videos, and television commercials before landing his first feature film, Zombieland, in 2009. His second feature, 30 Minutes or Less, opened in theaters on August 12, 2011.

Fleischer directed Gangster Squad, a 2013 action thriller film, based on the special tactical group created by the LAPD to combat the Los Angeles crime family. He next directed Venom, a film about Marvel Comics character Eddie Brock, starring Tom Hardy; it was released on October 5, 2018.

In 2019, he directed Zombieland: Double Tap, reuniting the four original leads. In February 2020, he was hired to direct Uncharted, based on the video game series of the same name. In September 2022, he was hired to direct Now You See Me: Now You Don't. In March 2026, it was announced he would direct the action comedy Protecting Jared for Netflix, starring Jason Momoa and Andy Samberg.

== Filmography ==
Short film

Year	Title	Director	Producer
2001	The Girls Guitar Club	Yes	Yes
2005	Gumball 3000: 6 Days in May	Yes	Yes

=== Feature film ===
Year	Title	Director	Executive Producer
2009	Zombieland	Yes	No
2011	30 Minutes or Less	Yes	No
2013	Gangster Squad	Yes	Yes
2018	Venom	Yes	No
2018	The Mule	No	Yes
2019	Zombieland: Double Tap	Yes	Yes
2021	Venom: Let There Be Carnage	No	Yes
2022	Uncharted	Yes	Yes
2025	Now You See Me: Now You Don't	Yes	No
TBA	Protecting Jared	Yes	No

Producer

- Two Night Stand (2014)
- Unicorn Store (2017)
- Bad Trip (2021)
- Little Brother (2026)

=== Television ===
Year	Title	Director	Executive producer	Notes
2003–2006	Jimmy Kimmel Live!	Yes	No	3 episodes
2006–2007	Rob & Big	No	Yes	Also creator
2008	Between Two Ferns with Zach Galifianakis	Yes	No	2 episodes
2009–2015	Fantasy Factory	No	Yes	Also creator
2010	Funny or Die Presents	Yes	No	4 episodes
2015	Marry Me	Yes	No	Episode "F Me"
2015–2021	Superstore	Yes	Yes	Directed 7 episodes
2016	American Housewife	Yes	Yes	Directed episode "Pilot"
2017	Santa Clarita Diet	Yes	Yes	Directed 2 episodes
2017–2021	The Bold Type	No	Yes	
2019–2020	Stumptown	Yes	Yes	Directed 1 episode
2023	The Good Doctor	Yes	No	1 episode
2023	White House Plumbers	No	Yes	
2023	Jury Duty	No	Yes	
2024	St. Denis Medical	Yes	Yes	Directed 2 episodes
2025	Motorheads	No	Yes	

=== Music video ===
Title	Artist
"Galang"	M.I.A.
"Fix Up, Look Sharp"	Dizzee Rascal
"Stand Up Tall"	Dizzee Rascal
"Pro Nails"	Kid Sister
"I Came From SF"	Gold Chains
"Cali Nights"	Gold Chains
"The Game"	Gold Chains
"Nada"	Gold Chains
"Dance Commander"	Electric Six
"Vicious Battle Raps"	DJ Format
"We Know Something You Don't"	DJ Format
"The Hit Song"	DJ Format
"Mocito"	Pigeon Funk
"Pies"	Wiley
"Dirty Girl"	Bobby Light
"Wash in the Rain"	The Bees
"Here She Comes Again"	The Stands
"I Believe in You"	Amp Fiddler
"Stadtkind"	Ellen Allien
"Time Bomb"	The Dismemberment Plan
"Just a Simple Plan"	Piebald
"French Jacuzzi Dub"	Explosion Robinson
"Come On to Me"	Major Lazer featuring Sean Paul

=== Commercials ===
Title	Brand
"Ladies Man"	Boost Mobile
"Geek"	Boost Mobile
"Shopaholic"	Boost Mobile
"Good Inside"	McDonald's
"After Party"	McDonald's
"Revision 43A"	Cisco
"Jack 245"	Cisco
"Call Jimmy"	Cisco
"Manager"	Cisco
"Up Late with The King"	Burger King
"Handoff"	Burger King
"Bounce"	Burger King
"Circles"	Eurostar
"Quiet"	ESPN
"Mascots"	ESPN
"The Drop"	Courir
"Nose"	Cinnamon Toast Crunch
"Infomercial"	Borat soundtrack
"Believe It or Not"	G4
"Asai Kenichi"	Levi's
"Hiroshi Fujiwara"	Levi's
"Chara"	Levi's
"Cops"	Ribena
"Down Home"	KFC
"Har Mar Superstar"	Vladivar
"A Way In"	Vogue

== Reception ==
Year	Title	Rotten Tomatoes Rating (%)	Budget ($)	Box office ($)
2009	Zombieland	89%	23.6 million	102.4 million
2011	30 Minutes or Less	45%	28 million	40.7 million
2013	Gangster Squad	30%	60–75 million	105.2 million
2018	Venom	31%	100–116 million	856.1 million
2019	Zombieland: Double Tap	68%	42–48 million	125.2 million
2022	Uncharted	41%	120 million	407.1 million
2025	Now You See Me: Now You Don't	61%	90 million	219 million

== Collaborations ==
Like many directors, Fleischer has worked with certain actors on two or more of his films:

Actor	Zombieland (2009)	30 Minutes or Less (2011)	Gangster Squad (2013)	Venom (2018)	Zombieland: Double Tap (2019)	Uncharted (2022)	Now You See Me: Now You Don't (2025)	Total
Abigail Breslin	check				check			2
Jesse Eisenberg	check	check			check		check	4
Woody Harrelson	check			check	check		check	4
Bill Murray	check				check			2
Michael Peña		check	check					2
Emma Stone	check		check		check			3
