= FabricLive.27 =

Compilation album by DJ Format
- Released: April 2006
- Genre: Hip-Hop/Jazz/Funk/Soul
- Label: Fabric
- Producer: DJ Format

DJ Format chronology
If You Can't Join 'Em… Beat 'Em (2005)	FabricLive.27 (2006)

FabricLive chronology
FabricLive.26 (2006)	FabricLive.27 (2006)	FabricLive.28 (2006)

FabricLive.27 is a DJ mix album by DJ Format, recorded as part of the FabricLive albums and released on the Fabric label in April 2006.

== Track listing ==
1. DJ Format - 33% B-Boy - [PIAS]
2. Ugly Duckling - U.D. in Brasil - Ugly Duckling
3. Lyrics Born - Do That There - Quannum Projects
4. DJ Format Ft. Abdominal & D-Sisive - 3 ft Deep - [PIAS]
5. Cut Chemist & This Kid Named Miles - SNT (Live at the Peace Pipe '93) - Kick Snare Hat
6. Coldcut - Beats & Pieces - Ahead of Our Time/Big Life
7. Aspects - Bristol Fingers - Aspects TV
8. Jimmy Smith - Root Down and Get It - UMG
9. Mr. Lif Ft. Edan - Get Wise '91 - Definitive Jux
10. Nostalgia 77 - Changes - Tru Thoughts
11. Ella Fitzgerald - Sunshine of Your Love - Universal Classics and Jazz
12. Marsha Hunt - Hot Rod Poppa - Track
13. Reverend Cleatus & the Soul Saviours - The Slip - Freestyle
14. Nina Simone - Save Me - BMG
15. Julie Driscoll, Brian Auger and the Trinity - Indian Rope Man - Polydor
16. Julian Covey & the Machine - Sweet Bacon - Island
17. We the People - Breakdown - Davel Music
18. Ellen McIlwaine - Toe Hold (Live at the Bitter End, New York) - Mercury
19. Karachi Prison Band - Put Some Grit In It - Magnetic Fields
20. Ruff Francis & the Illusions - Give Me Mercy - Essica
21. Linda Perry & the Soul Express / Eddie Billups - I Need Someone - Mainstream
22. John Murtaugh - Slinky - Polydor
23. Ananda Shankar - Dancing Drums - Saregama
24. Cleo Laine - Night Owl - Newquay
25. Edan Ft. Dagha - Rock and Roll - Lewis
