= Shifting Gears (Z-Trip album) =

Studio album by Z-Trip
- Released: April 19, 2005
- Genre: Hip-hop
- Length: 67:44
- Label: Hollywood Records
- Producer: Z-Trip

Singles from Shifting Gears
- 1. "Listen to the DJ" Released: 2005

Professional ratings
Review scores
Source	Rating
AllMusic	3.5/5 stars
IGN	8.0/10
PopMatters	7/10 stars
Rolling Stone	4/5 stars

Shifting Gears is the debut studio album by American DJ Z-Trip. It was released through Hollywood Records in 2005. It includes guest appearances from Soup, Whipper Whip, Lyrics Born, Busdriver, Supernatural, Luke Sick, Murs, Aceyalone, Mystic, Chester Bennington, and Chuck D.

== Critical reception ==
David Jeffries of AllMusic gave the album 3.5 stars out of 5, describing it as "a reminiscing album that is in love with a time when breakdancers and b-boys ruled and living without your Adidas was just impossible." Bill Werde of Rolling Stone gave the album 4 stars out of 5, saying, "These fifteen original tracks deploy sharp sampling, jazzy scratches and the sheer joy of old-school hip-hop."

== Track listing ==
No.	Title	Length
1.	"Intro"	0:28
2.	"Listen to the DJ" (featuring Soup)	4:16
3.	"All About the Music" (featuring Whipper Whip)	3:22
4.	"The Get Down" (featuring Lyrics Born)	3:46
5.	"About Face"	2:51
6.	"Furious"	4:04
7.	"Take Two Copies" (featuring Busdriver)	4:25
8.	"For My People" (featuring Supernatural)	4:10
9.	"Bury Me Standing" (featuring Luke Sick)	4:27
10.	"Breakfast Club" (featuring Murs and Supernatural)	4:53
11.	"3rd Gear"	3:53
12.	"Everything Changes" (featuring Aceyalone and Mystic)	5:23
13.	"Walking Dead" (featuring Chester Bennington)	4:33
14.	"Shock and Awe" (featuring Chuck D)	4:39
15.	"Revolution (STR Parts 1+2)"	15:21

== Charts ==
Chart	Peak position
US Billboard 200	90
US Top R&B/Hip-Hop Albums (Billboard)	56
