= DJ Format =

English DJ

- Born: Matt Ford
- Origin: Southampton, England
- Genres: Hip-hop
- Occupation: DJ
- Years active: 2003–present

Matt Ford, better known as DJ Format (a near-inversion of his birth name), is a hip hop DJ born in Southampton, England who lives in Brighton. He collaborates frequently with Abdominal on the album Music For the Mature B-Boy and with Abdominal and fellow Canadian rapper D-Sisive on the second full album If You Can't Join 'Em… Beat 'Em, as well as with Akil and Chali 2na from Jurassic 5.

== Career ==
Ford's first hip hop influences included A Tribe Called Quest and Main Source. One of his first releases was The Underground Strikes Back by Suspekt (Move. Germany 1996) features DJ Format on production and scratching. He established a relationship with Jurassic 5 and initially travelled with them as their bus driver. He came to national attention in 2002 when he opened on tour for DJ Shadow. In 2005, If You Can't Join 'Em… Beat 'Em reached the top 10 of the UK indie albums chart.

DJ Format's debut album "Music for the Mature B-Boy" was one of the slowburn success stories of 2003. Received with quiet acclaim in the press it quickly became a word of mouth triumph, going on to establish itself as one of the most successful debut artist albums from the UK alternative/urban scene. The campaign was successful for a number of reasons not least its three music videos directed by the then unknown Ruben Fleischer. The most famous of these was the rap and breakdancing costumed animals of 'We Know Something You Don't Know' featuring the vocals of Chali 2na and Akil of Jurassic 5 – played out by a shark and tiger respectively. "Music For The..." also led to Format supporting (alongside regular collaborator MC Abdominal) Jurassic 5 on their European tour, and through subsequent touring in 2003 establishing Format as one of the hottest live hip hop tickets in town culminating in triumphant appearances at Glastonbury, Reading & Leeds festivals and worldwide touring taking in the whole of Europe, North America and Australia.

In 2005 Format released his second album "If You Can't Join 'Em… Beat 'Em" and toured extensively throughout 2005/06.

In 2006 Format's fabriclive 27 in the Fabric DJ mix series was one of the most well received of the series. His DJ sets are renowned for their boundary-crossing selection of the funk, soul, rock & hip-hop and his fabric mix showed off a condensed version of the party set that he's built a solid reputation on. This was followed up by his own underground mix of obscure Eastern European beats, the now highly collectable 'European Vacation' CD. In 2008 Format released another mix album, this time for the Fania label, applying his b-boy style to a catalogue of Latin music. Alongside this, Format also discreetly released a 12" tribute to James Brown, Stealin' James.

== Discography ==
=== Albums ===
- Music for the Mature B-Boy (2003)
- If You Can't Join 'Em… Beat 'Em (2005) – UK Albums Chart No. 73
- Statement of Intent (2012)
- The Foremost DJ Format & Phill Most Chill (2013)
- Still Hungry DJ Format & Abdominal (2017)
- Devil's Workshop (2021)

=== Mixes ===
- A Right Earful Vol. 1 (2005)
- FabricLive.27 (April 2006)
- European Vacation (2006)
- Fania DJ Series – DJ Format (June 2007)
- Stealin' James (2008)
- Holy Shit with Mr Thing (2008)
- Kings of Rock (2009)
- The Simonsound – Have You Heard... (2009)

=== Singles ===
- "Vinyl Overdose" – Bomb Hip Hop (1997)
- "English Lesson" – Bomb Hip-Hop (1999)
- "Ill Culinary Behaviour" Featuring Abdominal – Genuine Records (2001)
- "B-Boy Code" Genuine Records (2002)
- "We Know Something You Don't Know" With Akil and Chali 2na from Jurassic 5 (2003) – UK Singles Chart No. 73
- "The Hit Song" (Feat. Abdominal) (2003)
- "Vicious Battle Raps" (Feat. Abdominal) (2003)
- "Rap Machine" (2005) (Feat. Abdominal)
- "3-Feet Deep" (2005) (Feat. Abdominal & D-Sisive)
- "Separated at Birth" (2005) (Feat. Abdominal & D-Sisive)
- "Mr. D.J." (2011) (Feat. Sureshot La Rock)
