= If You Can't Join 'Em... Beat 'Em =

If You Can't Join 'em... Beat 'em

Studio album by DJ Format
- Released: 11 April 2005
- Genre: Hip hop
- Length: 47:34
- Label: Genuine

DJ Format chronology
Music For the Mature B-Boy (2003)	If You Can't Join 'em... Beat 'em (2005)	FabricLive.27 (2006)

If You Can't Join 'Em... Beat 'Em is the second studio album by DJ Format.

== Track listing ==
1. "Intro"
2. "3 Feet Deep" (featuring Abdominal & D-Sisive)
3. "Participation Prerequisite" (featuring Abdominal)
4. "Another One of Those Songs" (featuring D-Sisive)
5. "The Turning Point"
6. "Ugly Brothers" (featuring Abdominal)
7. "Separated At Birth" (featuring Abdominal & D-Sisive)
8. "The Place" (featuring Chali 2na & Akil)
9. "Rap Machine" (featuring Abdominal)
10. "Black Cloud"
11. "I'm Good" (featuring Abdominal)
12. "2,3.. Scrape (Remix)"

== Samples ==
"Participation Prerequisite" includes Power Montage by Keith Mansfield
