= Are you OK =

Are you OK could refer to:

- Are You Okay?, an album by art-funk ensemble Was (Not Was)
- Are You OK?, a 2018 extended play by Skizzy Mars
- "Are You OK?", a song from Daniel Caesar's album Case Study 01
- R.U.OK?, a song on the 1999 album Adios by KMFDM

== See also ==
- Are You Ok Baby?, a 2023 Indian film
- R U OK?, an Australian non-profit suicide prevention organisation
- RUOK? (album), by Meat Beat Manifesto, 2002
- "R U OK" (song), by Tate McRae, 2020
