= Jurassic 5 =

American hip-hop group

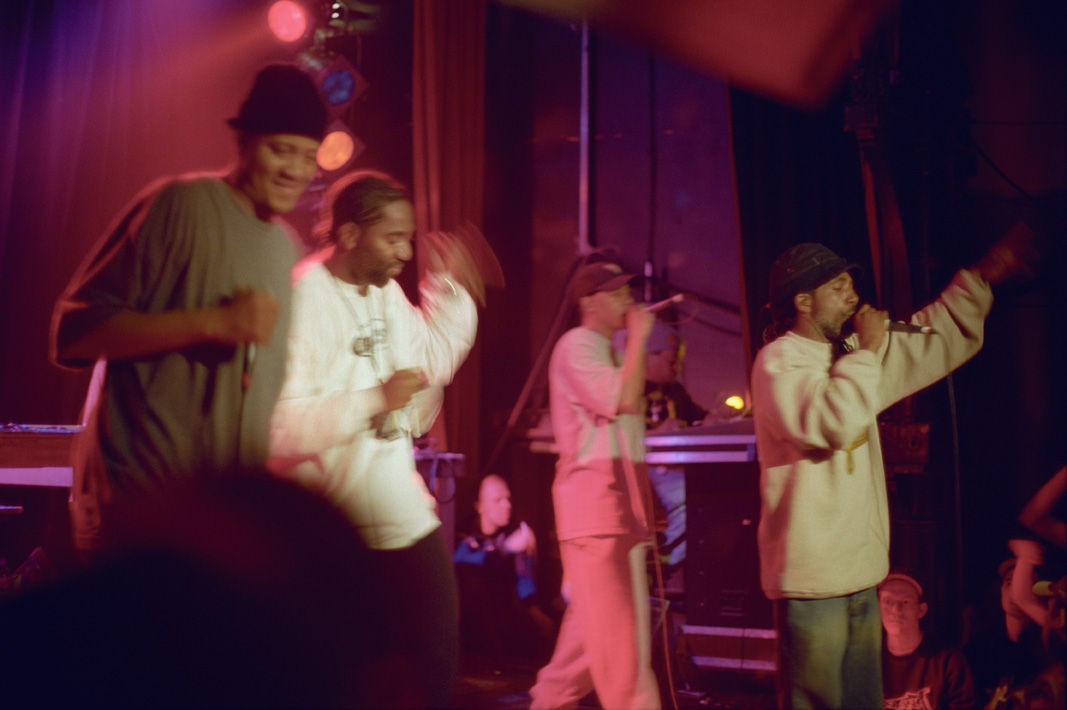
- Jurassic 5 in 2002

Background information
- Origin: Los Angeles, California, U.S.
- Genres: West Coast hip-hop; alternative hip-hop
- Years active: 1995–2007, 2013–present
- Labels: Rumble; Pan; TVT; Interscope; JVC
- Members: Akil; Zaakir; Marc 7 DJ Nu-Mark; Chali 2na Cut Chemist
- Website: jurassic-five.squarespace.com

Jurassic 5 is an American alternative hip-hop group formed by rappers Charles Stewart (Chali 2na), Dante Givens (Akil), Courtenay Henderson (Soup, a.k.a. Zaakir), and Marc Stuart (Marc 7); and disc jockeys Mark Potsic (DJ Nu-Mark) and Lucas Macfadden (Cut Chemist). The six-piece crew came out of the Los Angeles venue Good Life. The group broke up in 2007, shortly after releasing the LP Feedback, citing "musical differences," but returned to the stage in 2013 and released a new track in 2014. The members have continued to release music individually.

== History ==
Jurassic 5 debuted nationally in 1995 from TVT Records with their first single, "Unified Rebelution". Jurassic 5 released Jurassic 5 EP, their first record, in 1997. It "cemented their position in the 1990s alternative hip-hop movement, alongside artists such as Company Flow, Black Star and Kool Keith." The group later signed to Interscope Records, and the EP was repackaged with additional tracks and released in December 1998 as the full-length debut album, titled Jurassic 5. In a 2002 interview with The Sydney Morning Herald, the group explained the origin of their name. Chali 2na said, "I played the song to my friend's mother and she made a joke: 'You guys think you sound like the Fantastic Five, but you sound more like the Jurassic Five.' And we started laughing but, well, the name stuck."

This was followed by the album Quality Control, which peaked at No. 43 on the Billboard 200.

In 2002, they released Power In Numbers, which peaked at No. 15 on the Billboard 200 chart.

Jurassic 5 eventually toured without Cut Chemist, who left the group to pursue a solo career. The remaining five members released Feedback, their final album, on July 25, 2006. The album peaked at No. 15 on the Billboard 200.

The group split in 2007. The break-up was attributed to disagreements among members of the group.

In 2013, the group re-formed, including the return of Cut Chemist, for the Coachella Valley Music and Arts Festival and an international tour, primarily in the UK but also including dates in Ireland, Portugal, Spain, Japan and the United States. They played at Glastonbury in 2014 and had a Word of Mouth Reunion Tour during the Summer of 2014.

In 2016, they released their first new song in a decade, "Customer Service".

== In other media ==
Jurassic 5's music has been used in several video games. In 2000, "Jayou" was featured in Grind Session. The track "Improvise", from their second album Quality Control, was featured in the localized versions of Jet Set Radio, also released in 2000, and also the Japanese 2001 reissue De La Jet Set Radio, along with the instrumental of the song. The following year, the track "Great Expectations" from the same album was also included in Mat Hoffman's Pro BMX. In 2002, "What's Golden" was featured on ATV Offroad Fury 2. The song was additionally included in the video game Forza Horizon 3. "A Day at the Races" featuring Big Daddy Kane and Percee P appeared in the 2003 skateboarding game Tony Hawk's Underground. The song "In the House" from Feedback was featured in NBA Live 06. and "Work it Out" was in NBA Live 07, while "Red Hot" was featured in SSX on Tour. "Sum of Us" and "High Fidelity" from Power in Numbers was included in the 2019 game Trials Rising.

The group was featured in the 2001 hip-hop documentary Scratch and ranked among the online magazine UrbanSouth's elite list of underground hip-hop albums.

In December 2024, "Jayou" received renewed attention when it was used in the "See You in the Morning" advertising campaign by Kellogg's.

== Discography ==
=== Studio albums ===
List of studio albums, with selected chart positions, sales figures and certifications
| Title | Album details | Peak chart positions | | | | | | | | | | Sales | Certifications |
| Title | Album details | US | US R&B | US Rap | AUS | CAN | FRA | NZ | SWE | SWI | UK | Sales | Certifications |
|---|---|---|---|---|---|---|---|---|---|---|---|---|---|
| Jurassic 5 | Released: June 1, 1998 (UK); Label: Pan; Formats: CD, LP, cassette | — | — | — | — | — | — | — | — | — | 70 | | BPI: Gold |
| Quality Control | Released: June 6, 2000 (US); Label: Interscope; Formats: CD, LP, cassette | 43 | 33 | — | 69 | 51 | — | — | 37 | — | 23 | US: 387,000 | BPI: Gold |
| Power in Numbers | Released: October 8, 2002 (US); Label: Interscope; Formats: CD, LP, cassette | 15 | 13 | — | 16 | — | — | 22 | — | 96 | 46 | US: 379,000 | BPI: Gold |
| Feedback | Released: July 25, 2006 (US); Label: Interscope; Formats: CD, LP, digital download | 15 | 12 | 6 | 36 | 27 | 136 | 39 | — | 25 | 59 | | |
"—" denotes a recording that did not chart or was not released in that territory.

=== Extended plays ===
List of extended plays
| Title | Album details |
|---|---|
| Jurassic 5 EP | Released: October 13, 1997 (US); Label: Rumble; Formats: CD, LP, cassette |

=== Singles ===
List of singles, with selected chart positions, showing year released and album name
| Title | Year | Peak chart positions | | | | Certifications | Album |
| Title | Year | US R&B | US Rap | AUS | UK | Certifications | Album |
|---|---|---|---|---|---|---|---|
| "Unified Rebelution" | 1995 | — | — | — | — | | Non-album single |
| "Jayou" | 1998 | — | — | — | 56 | | Jurassic 5 |
| "Concrete Schoolyard" | 1998 | — | — | — | 35 | BPI: Silver | Jurassic 5 |
| "Improvise" | 1999 | — | 41 | — | — | | Jurassic 5 |
| "Quality Control" | 2000 | 96 | 12 | — | — | | Quality Control |
| "W.O.E. Is Me (World of Entertainment)" | 2001 | 94 | 8 | — | — | | Quality Control |
| "The Influence" | 2001 | — | — | — | — | | Quality Control |
| "Hard Times" (with The Pharcyde) | 2002 | — | — | — | — | | Straight from the Crates, Vol. 1 |
| "What's Golden" | 2002 | 90 | — | — | — | | Power in Numbers |
| "If You Only Knew" | 2003 | — | — | 99 | — | | Power in Numbers |
| "Freedom" | 2003 | — | — | — | — | | Power in Numbers |
| "Thin Line" (featuring Nelly Furtado) | 2003 | — | — | — | — | | Power in Numbers |
| "Hey" | 2004 | — | — | — | — | | Power in Numbers |
| "Linguistics" | 2004 | — | — | — | 143 | | Non-album single |
| "Red Hot" | 2005 | — | — | — | — | | Feedback |
| "Canto de Ossanha" | 2006 | — | — | — | — | | Feedback |
| "Work It Out" (featuring Dave Matthews Band) | 2006 | — | — | — | 116 | | Feedback |
| "Customer Service" | 2016 | — | — | — | — | | Non-album single |
"—" denotes a recording that did not chart or was not released in that territory.

=== Guest appearances ===
List of non-single guest appearances, with other performing artists, showing year released and album name
| Title | Year | Other artist(s) | Album |
|---|---|---|---|
| "Improvise" | 1999 | Sway & King Tech | This or That |
| "Lunchtime" | 2001 | Click Tha Supah Latin | Square Won |
| "Verbal Gunfight" | 2002 | none | One Big Trip soundtrack |
| "iPictorial Wallet" | 2022 | Canibus | One Step Closer to Infinity |

=== Music videos ===
List of music videos, with directors, showing year released
| Title | Year | Director(s) |
|---|---|---|
| "Concrete Schoolyard" | 1999 | Delaney Bishop |
| "Quality Control" | 2000 | Jeff Richter |
| "The Influence" | 2001 | Marcos Siega |
| "What's Golden" | 2002 | Logan |
| "Work It Out" (featuring Dave Matthews Band) | 2006 | The Malloys |
| "The Way We Do It" | 2014 | Alex Knudsen |
