= Soup (rapper) =

American rapper

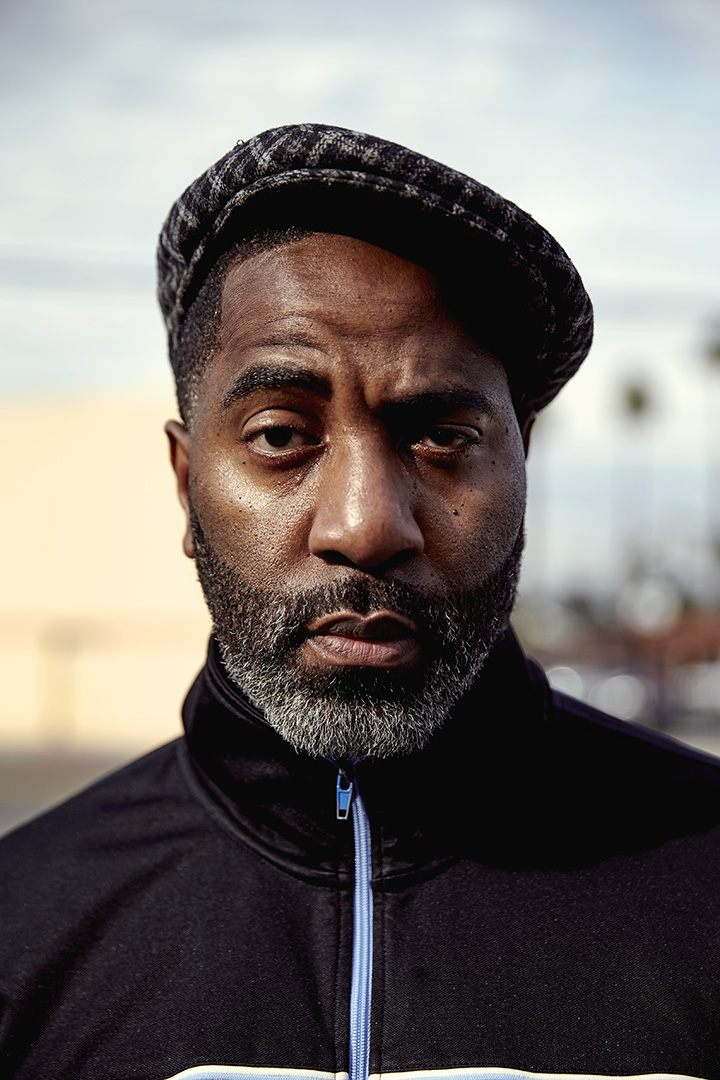
- Photo by Chris Swainston for the 'Still in Fullee Love' EP release

Background information
- Also known as: Zaakir Muhammad; Fullee Love
- Born: Courtenay Henderson
- Origin: Los Angeles, California, USA
- Genres: Hip hop, R&B, soul
- Occupations: Musician, producer
- Instrument: Rapping
- Label: Nalja
- Member of: Jurassic 5
- Formerly of: The Rebels of Rhythm, Portable Payback

Courtenay Henderson, best known under the alias of Soup and also known as Zaakir Muhammad and Fullee Love, is an American rapper and founding member of the group, Jurassic 5.

== Personal life ==
Growing up in South Central Los Angeles, Soup was deeply influenced by his music-loving father. At a young age, he was introduced to the genre of funk, through artists such as the Ohio Players and the Fatback Band, as well as soul and the blues, through icons like Otis Redding, Muddy Waters, and Sam Cooke. Soup's early musical experiences also included learning to sing songs by Al Green and Fats Domino. Over time, Soup broadened his musical scope to include hip hop, discovering groups like The Sugarhill Gang.

Soup attended Manual Arts High School in Los Angeles. While in high school, his uncle, a member of a gang task-force, informed him of a "Rap for Peace" contest, where Soup performed his first ever recorded song, "Stop Gang Violence." This performance is noted as a pivotal moment in the launch of Soup's music career.

== Music career ==
=== The Rebels of Rhythm ===
In high school, Soup joined forces with Akil (later of Jurassic 5) and Shawny Mac, aka "Afrika," to form The Rebels of Rhythm. Initially interested in singing, Soup shifted his focus to rapping after Akil encouraged him to explore freestyling.

=== Jurassic 5 ===
Soup achieved fame with the hip hop group, Jurassic 5. An influential figure in the music industry, he played a key role in securing record deals for other artists, including Mobb Deep, at labels such as Immortal Records, Interscope and Loud Records. He contributed to the production of acclaimed albums such as Wu-Tang Clan's "Enter the Wu-Tang (36 Chambers)," and Mobb Deep's "The Infamous," for which he received gold records. Soup was also instrumental in obtaining Jurassic 5’s initial demo deal with Relativity Records.

Jurassic 5 gained a reputation for their dynamic live performances, particularly during the 2000 and 2001 Warped Tours. At one event in 2000, Soup directly addressed the audience after an incident where an object was thrown on stage, exemplifying his direct and engaging stage presence. The group is celebrated for their distinctive blend of rapping and harmonizing, with melodies and hooks that influenced other hip hop groups, such as the Cold Crush Brothers. In a 2022 interview on Talib Kweli's People's Party podcast, DJ Nu-Mark praised Soup's role in defining Jurassic 5's harmonization and infectious hooks.

=== Portable Payback ===
In 2008, Soup, along with Marc 7, established a new group, Portable Payback. They released their debut single, "Relax," followed by an EP of the same name on October 27, 2009.

=== Fullee Love ===
Soup embarked on a solo career under the pseudonym Fullee Love, releasing his debut EP, Still In Fullee Love, in February of 2017. The EP, produced by Nicholas "Nick Green" Eaholtz and released on the Nalja Music label, incorporates R&B and soul influences reminiscent of the music Soup encountered during his childhood. According to OC Weekly:

"It's a glimpse into the music that shaped Henderson and combines his smooth flow and sharp lyrics with a touch of R&B and soul—stuff he'd grown up with as a kid."

The majority of the tracks on Still In Fullee Love were conceived when Jurassic 5 reconvened after a seven-year hiatus to perform at Coachella in 2013. He also performed in London, Barcelona, and Portugal in late 2013.

=== Guest appearances ===
Soup has made several notable guest appearances. On April 19, 2005, he was featured in DJ Z-Trip's single, "Listen to the DJ." In the same year, Soup appeared on "Family Rap" by Breakestra from their album, Hit the Floor. More recently, in 2015, he contributed to "Right About Now" on Marc 7's solo album, Food, Clothing, and Shelter.

== Film ==
Soup's voice and on-screen roles extend to various media. He performed voiceover work and appeared in the music video for Jurassic 5’s "The Influence." His television credits include appearances on Nickelodeon's All That, the film Blast, starring Eddie Griffin, and the FOX series Fastlane, with Bill Bellamy.
