= Chali 2na =

American rapper (born 1971)

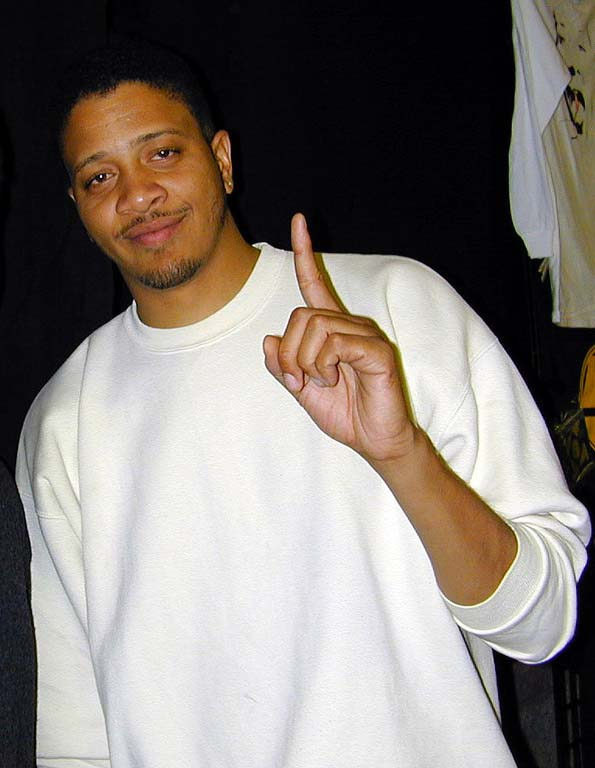
- Stewart in 2004

Background information
- Born: Charles Stewart; June 26, 1971 (age 55); Chicago, Illinois, U.S.
- Origin: Los Angeles, California, U.S.
- Genre: Hip hop
- Occupations: Rapper; songwriter
- Labels: Monstercat; Decon

Charles Stewart (born June 26, 1971), better known as Chali 2na (/tʃɑːli ˈtuːnə/), is an American painter and rapper, associated with the groups Jurassic 5 and Ozomatli. He is known for his bass-baritone voice and quick-delivery rapping style.

== Personal life ==
=== Early life ===
As a young boy, Stewart moved to South Central Los Angeles, where the group Jurassic 5 was formed in 1993. He was raised by his grandmother, a practicing Christian, he later converted to Islam. His stage name is a reference to Charlie the Tuna, the deep-voiced animated mascot of StarKist Tuna. He and Cut Chemist became friends in high school. Together with Marc 7, they were part of a three-man group called Unity Committee. The Unity Committee crew would often spend Thursday nights performing at the Good Life Café, where rappers and spoken word poets showed off their skills in an open mic format. They were, along with another three-person troupe called the Rebels of Rhythm, routinely chosen as the crowd's favorite performers. The two crews also appreciated one another's styles, and they teamed to record a 12" single, "Unified Rebelution", in 1995. The Rebels of Rhythm were MCs Akil and Zaakir (also known as Soup); the men banded together to form Jurassic 5. In 2006, Cut Chemist elected to split from the group to pursue a solo career, and the Jurassic 5 group split up altogether in 2007.

He is a founding member of the activist salsa funk band Ozomatli; although no longer an official member (having been replaced as resident MC by Jabu of 4th Avenue Jones), he continues to collaborate with them on occasion and maintains his friendships with them. Along with salsa, his music and theirs have been influenced by reggae and soul music; he is also a fan of house music.

Chali 2na is a teetotaler.

== Music career ==
=== Jurassic 5 ===
He is a founding member of Jurassic 5, which boasted in the song "Improvise" that the four MCs sounded like one.

=== Solo album ===
Fish Market, an official mix tape, was compiled and released October 25, 2004.

The mixtape is called the Fish Market, and basically, it's just an accumulation of a bunch of songs that I did with other people man, that a lot of people might not have heard or might have, but might not have wanted to buy that album just to hear that song or whatever. So people could just pick it up, and it can kind of be like a little handbook on Chali 2na, before he actually comes out with an actual solo album. It's a series as well, because there is gonna be a Fish Market, Part 2 with a bunch of other stuff that didn't make it.

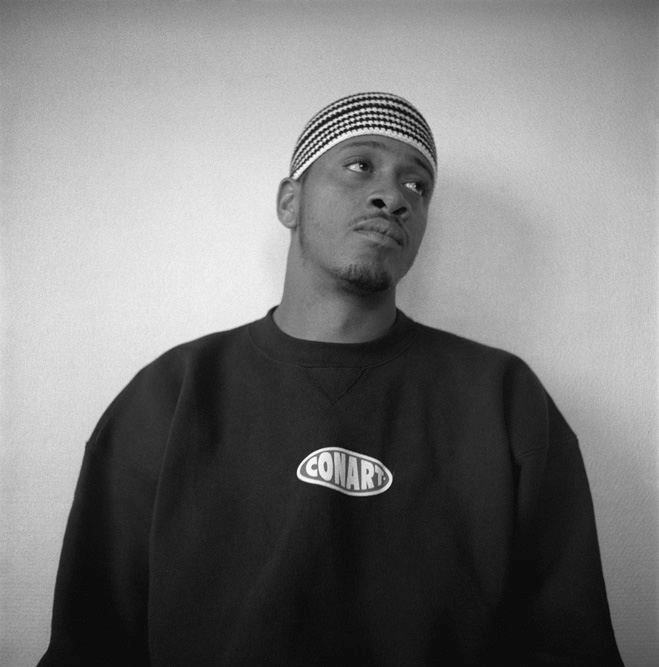
2002

"Don't Stop", the would-be first single from Fish Outta Water, appeared in January 2006. It showcased 2na's familiar rapid-fire flow; in its lyrics, 2na professed his dedication to hip hop culture, insulting rappers who neglect to pay proper respect to pioneers like Kool Herc and Afrika Bambaataa. He also spoke deferentially of Tupac Shakur.

"Don't Stop"'s chorus was sung by neo-soul artist Anthony Hamilton. It was featured in the soundtrack of the video game NBA Live 06. A second Chali 2na solo song, "The Anchor Man", was featured on the Dan The Automator-curated soundtrack to the latest installment in the game series, NBA 2K7. Another song, "Something Different", was also featured on the All-Pro Football 2K8 soundtrack.

Five years after Fish Market, a solo album, titled Fish Outta Water, was released. The album received generally positive reviews, holding a score of 70 on Metacritic. 2na delves into some of the formative experiences in his life, including a tragic incident in which his cousin, Be-Be, was killed in the 2003 E2 nightclub stampede. Collaborators on the album include Beenie Man (with whom he recorded "International"), Raphael Saadiq, his longtime friend Rakaa Iriscience, Talib Kweli, Anthony Hamilton, Damian Marley and Ming Xia (on the final track 4 Be Be).

Another mixtape was released in 2010, Fish Market Part 2. Much like the first Fish Market album, this is mainly filled with collaborations 2na has completed throughout his career with famous artists such as Linkin Park.

In an interview with Mr. Wavvy, 2na revealed that he has a series of 5 EPs prepped for the near future.

Chali 2na's song "Step Yo Game Up" was featured in a popular video game in 2012 called Sleeping Dogs.

=== Collaborations ===
Chali 2na collaborated several times with fellow MCs. Many, but not all of his featured guest appearances are cataloged on the Fish Market albums, mixtapes he released to give his collaborations to "people [who] might not have wanted to buy that album just to hear that song or whatever."

He is a good friend of and frequent collaborator with British hip hop star Roots Manuva, having worked with him on a number of songs (including "Revolution 5", which appears on Fish Market and Dub Come Save Me, and "Join The Dots", which appears on Roots Manuva's second proper album, Run Come Save Me). He has also referenced his friend in the lyrics.

He has worked with Linkin Park on the song "Frgt/10" and the skit "Chali" from the 2002 album Reanimation. The song was also featured on Fish Market. He worked with Ozomatli on their first album and toured with New Orleans funk band Galactic. He is also featured on Galactic's 2007 release From the Corner to the Block on the cut "Think Back".

He collaborated with Blackalicious on their 2002 album Blazing Arrow on the track "4000 Miles," alongside Lateef the Truthspeaker.

2na appears alongside fellow Jurassic 5 MC, Akil, on the track "We know something you don't know" on the 2003 album Music for the Mature B-Boy by UK artist DJ Format.

2na's work in Jurassic 5's "Red Hot" features alongside "International," in the 2005 video game SSX on Tour.

Fatlip's 2005 "Today's Your Day (Whachagonedu)" from the acclaimed album The Loneliest Punk includes a verse from 2na.

Chali 2na was also featured on Lyrics Born's Everywhere at Once album, performing on "Hott 2 Deff". Lyrics Born was also the MC for The Deadliest Catch Tour 2009. This hip-hop tour featured Chali 2na, Gift of Gab and Mr. Lif.

On K'naan's 2009 album, Troubadour, Chali was featured on "America" together with Mos Def.

Chali 2na appears on the song The People Tree, which is track 2 on N.A.S.A.'s 2009 album The Spirit of Apollo.

On Long Beach Dub Allstars 2001 album Wonders of the World Chali was featured on "Life Goes On" also featuring Half-Pint, Ives (of Delinquent Habits), and Tippa Irie. In 2008 Chali 2Na recorded with Ditch for Ditch's CD Public Intoxication on the song "All Comes Down To Money" which he co-wrote with Ditch.

Furthermore, Chali 2Na recorded a track together with Dutch rap artist Jerome XL in 2008. The track "King Sh#t" was released on JXL's solo debut album The Last Day in the first quarter of 2010.

In June 2010, British dubstep star Rusko released a collaboration with Chali 2na entitled "Gadget GoGo". The track was released as a bonus track to accompany the release of Rusko's debut solo record OMG. The track was also featured on Fish Market, Part 2.

Chali 2na appeared on the track "Speaking in Tongues" from the album Drinking From the Sun, the 2012 release from Australian hip-hop artists Hilltop Hoods.

Chali 2na featured on the song "Get Original" on the Black Eyed Peas album Bridging the Gap released in 2000.

In 2012, he featured on the remix of "Dreamers" by British hip-hop duo Rizzle Kicks.

In 2012, he featured in Slightly Stoopid's track "Just Thinking" on their album, Top of the World.

In 2014, he guest starred in Epic Rap Battles of History, portraying famous scientist Neil deGrasse Tyson.

In 2015, he was featured on the song "Love Is Killing Me" by Savoy, which was released on Monstercat.

In 2016, he collaborated with Canadian electro-funk band The Funk Hunters for a 5-song EP titled ILLectric, released through Westwood and also with Australian beatbox/ loop station specialist dub FX on two tracks: "in another life" - which is a reworking of his track love's gonna getcha, and "the sky" which is with dub princess as well as dub FX.

2017 saw a partnership with Krafty Kuts, the English DJ and this has seen the release of two tracks "It Ain't My Fault" ft Dynamite MC and "Hands High". An album is due for released March 2018 according to Chali himself on Lauren Laverne's BBC 6 Music show.

Chali 2na appeared on alternative-reggae band, The Movement's track "Break in the Glass" from their 2019 album Ways of the World.

== Film ==
Chali 2na is featured prominently in the award-winning documentary This Is the Life, chronicling the music movement that was birthed at The Good Life Cafe in South Central Los Angeles. The Good Life is the open-mic workshop where he first performed with Unity Committee in the early 1990s and founded Jurassic 5.

Chali 2na is also featured in the documentary Freestyle: The Art of Rhyme, and in the movie Never Been Kissed as part of Ozomatli, performing in a club.

Chali 2na is interviewed in RASH – a 2005 documentary film about Melbourne street art and graffiti – on his passion for graffiti as he paints his signature Tuna fish in murals with Australian artists including Phibs. The session involved painting murals on Smith St and Brunswick St in Melbourne. Chali was taking a short breather while on the band's 2005 Australian tour.

Chali 2na has also starred in the Epic Rap Battles of History video, Sir Isaac Newton versus Bill Nye as astrophysicist Neil deGrasse Tyson.

== Street art ==
Chali2na is an accomplished graffiti artist - and has painted extensively across Australia - including Perth and has been a regular painter at the Bondi Beach Graffiti Wall.

== Discography ==
=== Albums ===
Chali 2na

- Fish Outta Water (2009)
- Adventures of a Reluctant Superhero with Krafty Kuts (2019)

Jurassic 5

- Jurassic 5 (1998)
- Quality Control (2000)
- Power in Numbers (2002)
- Feedback (2006)

Other collaborations

- Ozomatli (1998) (with Ozomatli)
- The Dino 5 (2008) (with Ladybug Mecca, Prince Paul, Scratch & Wordsworth, as The Dino 5)
- R.I.D.S. (2012) (with Roc 'C', as Ron Artiste)

=== Mixtapes and EPs ===
Mixtapes

- Fish Market (2004)
- Fish Market Part 2 (2010)

EPs

- Jurassic 5 (1997) (Jurassic 5)
- Against the Current EP 1 (2012)
- Against the Current EP 2 : Manphibian Music (2014)
- Against the Current EP 3 : Bloodshot Fisheye (2015)
- ILLectric EP (2016) (with The Funk Hunters)

=== Guest appearances ===
- Black Eyed Peas - "Get Original" on Bridging the Gap (2000)
- Swollen Members - "Full Contact" on Bad Dreams (2001)
- Roots Manuva - "Join the Dots" on Run Come Save Me (2001)
- Long Beach Dub Allstars - "Life Goes On" on Wonders of the World (2001)
- Blackalicious - "4000 Miles" on Blazing Arrow (2002)
- Roots Manuva - "Revolution 5" on Dub Come Save Me (2002)
- Linkin Park - "Frgt/10 (feat. Chali 2NA)" on Reanimation (2002)
- Slimkid3 - "Follow I'll Lead" on Liberation (2002)
- Soulive - "Doin' Something" on Turn It Out Remixed (2003)
- DJ Format - "We Know Something You Don't Know" on Music for the Mature B-Boy (2003)
- Ozomatli - "Who's to Blame" on Street Signs (2004)
- Supernatural - "It Ain't a Game" on S.P.I.T. (2005)
- DJ Nu-Mark feat. Chali 2na - "Comin' Thru" on Mushroom Jazz Vol. 5 (2005)
- DJ Format - "The Place" on If You Can't Join 'Em... Beat 'Em (2005)
- Fatlip - "Today's Your Day (Whachagonedu?)" on The Loneliest Punk (2005)
- Breakestra - "Family Rap" on Hit the Floor (2005)
- Sérgio Mendes - "Yes, Yes Y'All" on Timeless (2006)
- Marcelo D2 - "That's What I Got" on Meu Samba É Assim (2006)
- Dan the Automator - "Anchor Man" on Dan the Automator Presents 2K7 (2006)
- Zion I & The Grouch - "Too Much" on Heroes in the City of Dope (2006)
- X Clan - "Funky 4 U" on Return from Mecca (2007)
- Galactic - "Think Back" on From the Corner to the Block (2007)
- Percee P - "No Time for Jokes" on Perseverance (2007)
- Aceyalone - "Eazy" on Lightning Strikes (2007)
- K'naan - "America" on Troubadour (2008)
- Lyrics Born - "Hott 2 Deff" on Everywhere at Once (2008)
- The Mighty Underdogs - "Warwalk" on Droppin' Science Fiction (2008)
- Solillaquists of Sound - "Death of the Muse" on No More Heroes (2008)
- N.A.S.A. - "The People Tree" on The Spirit of Apollo (2009)
- Speech - "Start Spreading the News" on The Grown Folks Table (2009)
- Jerome XL - "King Sh#t" on De Laatste Dag (2010)
- Rakaa - "Mean Streak" on Crown of Thorns (2010)
- Hilltop Hoods - "Speaking in Tongues" on Drinking from the Sun (2012)
- House Shoes - "So Different / Moody Interlude" on Let It Go (2012)
- Run DMT - "This or That" on Union Of Opposites (2012)
- Rizzle Kicks - "Epic Dreamers' Remix" (2012)
- Slightly Stoopid - "Just Thinking" on Top Of The World (2012)
- Oh No - "Animals" on Disrupted Ads (2013)
- Morcheeba - "Face of Danger" on Head Up High (2013)
- Savoy - "Love Is Killing Me" on 1000 Years (2015)
- Krafty Kuts - "Hands High" on Hands High (EP)
- Cut Chemist - "Work My Mind" on Die Cut (EP) (2018)
- Slightly Stoopid - "Higher Now" on Everyday Life, Everyday People (2018)
- Ozomatli - "Libertad" on Libertad (EP) (2019)
- The Movement - "Break in the Glass" on Ways of the World (2019)
