= DJ Nu-Mark =

American DJ (born 1971)

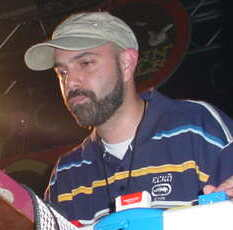
- DJ Nu-Mark performing in 2002

Background information
- Born: Mark Potsic; June 10, 1971 (age 55)
- Origin: Los Angeles, California
- Genres: Hip-hop
- Occupations: Producer, DJ
- Instrument: Sampler
- Years active: 1994–present
- Labels: Hot Plate Records, Up Above Records, Sequence Records, Mochilla, Delicious Vinyl
- Website: www.unclenu.com

Mark Potsic, better known by his stage name DJ Nu-Mark (born June 10, 1971), is an American hip-hop producer and DJ. He is a member of Jurassic 5, as well as the owner of Hot Plate Records. He has collaborated with and produced for a variety of artists across different genres, including J-Live, Aloe Blacc, Charles Bradley, and Bumpy Knuckles, among others.

In 2004, the Hands On mixtape was released on Sequence Records. In 2012, DJ Nu-Mark released the album titled Broken Sunlight on Hot Plate Records. In 2014, Slimkid3 & DJ Nu-Mark, his collaborative album with Slimkid3, was released by Delicious Vinyl.

== Discography ==
=== Studio albums ===
- Blend Crafters Volume One (2004, with Pomo)
- Broken Sunlight (2012)
- Slimkid3 & DJ Nu-Mark (2014, with Slimkid3)
- TRDMRK (2019)
- Run For Cover (2021)

=== Mixtapes ===
- Hands On (2004)
- Take Me with You (2011)

=== EPs ===
- Broken Sunlight Series 1 (2012)
- Broken Sunlight Series 2 (2012)
- Broken Sunlight Series 3 (2012)
- Broken Sunlight Series 4 (2012)
- Broken Sunlight Series 5 (2012)
- Broken Sunlight Series 6 (2012)
- ‘’Trademark EP’’ (2018)

=== Singles ===
- "Chali 2na Comin' Thru" b/w "Brand Nu Live" (2004)
- "Imagine" (2004, with Pomo)
- "Lola" b/w "Unwind" (2004, with Pomo)
- "Oyá Indeburê" b/w "Tough Break" (2013)
- "Our Generation" (2013)
- "Bom Bom Fiya" b/w "Bouillon" (2014, with Slimkid3)
- "I Know, Didn't I" b/w "No Pity Party" (2014, with Slimkid3)
- "King" b/w "Let Me Hit" (2014, with Slimkid3)

=== Productions ===
- Mannish – "Speaker Time" from Audio Sedative (1995)
- J-Live – "The Zone" from Then What Happened? (2008)
- Hilltop Hoods – "Classic Example" from State of the Art (2009)
- Chali 2na – "Comin' Thru" and "Graff Time" from Fish Outta Water (2009)
- The Lonely Island – "The Old Saloon" and "Punch You in the Jeans" from Incredibad (2009)
- The Lonely Island – "Rocky" from Turtleneck & Chain (2011)
- Slimkid3 – Another Day Another Dollar (2011)
- The Lonely Island – "Spell It Out" and "I Don't Give a Honk" from The Wack Album (2013)
- Chinese Man – "Sho-Bro (DJ Nu-Mark Remix)" (2015)
- The Lonely Island – "Sushi Glory Hole" (2024)
