= MF Grimm discography =

- Studio albums: 7
- EPs: 3
- Compilation albums: 2
- Mixtapes: 3

The discography of American hip hop artist MF Grimm consists of seven studio albums (including two collaborations), three EPs, three mixtapes and two compilation albums. Although MF Grimm's rapping career began in the late 1980s, his debut record did not come until 2000 in the form of the MF EP, a collaborative project with MF Doom. Grimm had previously executive produced MF Doom's debut solo album Operation: Doomsday, as well as aiding with the mixing and recording, on top of having a solo track on the project. Grimm's debut album, The Downfall of Ibliys: A Ghetto Opera was released in 2002. The third collaborative project with Drasar Monumental in the Good Morning Vietnam series was released November 25, 2014. Grimm's discography is also notable in that his album American Hunger is the first triple disc album of original material by a solo hip hop artist.

On February 4, 2015, it was announced that a compilation of love songs would be released for Valentines Day. This compilation is slated to be called "MF Love Songs" and will cover the majority of Grimm's career.

On March 15, 2021, MF Grimm released The Hunt For The Gingerbread Man 2: Get The Dough produced by Darko the Super, premiering an animated music video for the track Candy Rain (Falling Down) directed by NutzenTV.

== Studio albums ==
Solo Albums
Album title	Release date
The Downfall of Ibliys: A Ghetto Opera	January 12, 2002
Digital Tears: E-mail from Purgatory (credited to GM Grimm as Superstar Jet Jaguar)	March 1, 2004
American Hunger	July 25, 2006
The Hunt for the Gingerbread Man	September 25, 2007
You Only Live Twice: The Audio Graphic Novel	June 8, 2010
The Hunt for the Gingerbread Man 2: Get the Dough	March 15, 2021

== Collaborative releases ==
Collaborations
Release title	Release date
MF EP (with MF Doom)	November 28, 2000
Special Herbs + Spices Volume 1 (with MF Doom)	May 11, 2004
Good Morning Vietnam (with Drasar Monumental)	December 16, 2012
Good Morning Vietnam 2: The Golden Triangle (with Drasar Monumental)	November 7, 2013
Good Morning Vietnam 3: The Phoenix Program (with Drasar Monumental)	November 25, 2014

== Compilation albums ==
Compilation Albums
Album title	Release date
Best of MF (with MF Doom)	September 2003
Scars and Memories	April 25, 2005
MF Love Songs	February 14, 2015

== Mixtapes ==
Mixtapes
Mixtape Title	Release date
The Order of the Baker Mixtape	September 24, 2007
Story: Substance, Style, Structure and the Principles of Hip Hop	August 24, 2009
Preemptive Strike (with Drasar Monumental)	November 7, 2012

== Singles ==
Single
Single	Release date

== Other appearances ==
Guest Appearances
Album Artist	Album title	Track	Release date
Kurious	A Constipated Monkey	Baby Bust It	January 18, 1994
Kool G Rap	4,5,6	Take Em to War, Money on my Brain	September 12, 1995
MF Doom	Operation: Doomsday	Tick, Tick	April 20, 1999
KMD	Black Bastards	What a Niggy Know (Remix)	May 15, 2001
Various Artists	Farewell Fondle 'Em	Scars & Memories	October 30, 2001
X-Ray	Monster Mixes, Vol. 1	The Original (Remix)	2002
Rodan	Theophany: Book of Elevations	Run the Sphere v2.3	February 4, 2004
YOKAY	The Outcome	The Streets	April 2, 2004
Third Sight	Symbionese Liberation Album	Will I Get Shot By A Dope Fiend?	January 31, 2006
Parallel Thought	Drugs, Liquor, Sex & Cigarettes	I Wonder	July 28, 2006
Various Artists	A Chronic Tribute to Dr. Dre	Natural Born Killaz	January 30, 2007
Kongcrete	Shackles Off	It's Official	June 28, 2008
Infinit Evol	Megatron	Dancing with the Stars, Get in Line	October 31, 2013
