= Day by Day Entertainment =

American record label

- Founded: 1999
- Founder: Percy Carey
- Genre: Hip hop
- Country of origin: United States
- Location: New York City, Los Angeles

Day by Day Entertainment is an independent hip hop record label and record distribution company based in New York City. It was started in 1999 by MF Grimm before his three-year incarceration which started in 2000.

After a brief hiatus, Day by Day Entertainment was relaunched on August 24, 2009. After several years of relative inactivity, the label released new material by MF Grimm and Ayatollah.

Part of the significance of the label's being a taste-maker of underground hip-hop music is its release of The Downfall of Ibliys: A Ghetto Opera of tracks recorded within 24 hours of going to prison, and American Hunger, which is MF Grimm's three-disc volume of new material recorded in 2006. The releases were well received by Pitchfork.

== Artists ==
- Ayatollah
- Dionté BOOM
- Infinit Evol
- MF Grimm
- Rseenal Di Artillary
- SinSerious

=== Former artists ===
- Binkis Recs
- Broady Champs
- Block McCloud
- B-Will
- Cryptic One
- Dub-L
- DNAE
- Cadence
- Chops
- Count Bass D
- John Doe
- Krohme
- Lightheaded
- Megalon (officially with X-Ray's Mindbenda Recordings)
- MF Doom
- Monsta Island Czars
- Mudville (officially with Slurry Records)
- Prophetix (officially with Asylum Entertainment)
- Rob Swift
- Rodan
- Serengeti
- Stronghold
- Twiz The Beat Pro
- 9th Scientist

== Discography ==
9th Scientist

- Tru Kingz of Boom (2010)

Atoms Family

- The Prequel (2004)

Ayentee

- The Manual (2003)

B-Will & Infinit EVOL

- The Professor & the Mutant (with Complex Sound Design) (2004)

Binkis

- The Reign Begins (2002)

Block McCloud

- Spittin' Image (2006)

Block McCloud & Island Academy

- FTW (Fuck the World (2006)

Broady Champs

- Breakfast of Champions (2006)

Cadence

- Poisons the Minds of the Children (2003)

Chops

- Food for Naught (2003)

Count Bass D

- Dwight Spitz (2002) (with High Times & Metal Face Records)

Cryptic One

- The Anti-Mobius Strip Theory (2004)

Dionté BOOM

- "Aswé A" (2014)

Dub-L

- Day of the Mega Beast! (2004)

Duo Live

- The Official Free Lunch Mix CD (2004)

Hasan Salaam

- Paradise Lost (2005)

InfinitEvol

- Megatron (2013)

Jeff Spec

- Dark City (2002)

John Doe

- Meet John Doe (2003)
- All About the Doe Vol. 1 (2003)
- How to Remix the Black Album (2004)

Junclassic

- 2 Much Ain't Enuff (2007)

Kongcrete

- "Gorilla Warfare" (2003) (with Mindbenda Recordings)

Kush

- Costanza Wallets (2012)

Lightheaded

- Pure Thoughts (2002)
- Never Square / Illuminate Part 1 (2004)

Megalon

- A Penny for Your Thoughts (2004) (courtesy of Mindbenda Recordings)

MF Doom

- Calculated Attacks (2019) (as King Ghidra)

MF Doom / MF Grimm

- Best of MF (2003)
- Special Herbs and Spices Vol. 1 (2004)
- "MF EP" (2015, originally released 2000)
- "Tick, Tick..." (2015)

MF Grimm

- The Downfall of Ibliys: A Ghetto Opera (2002) (with Metal Face Records)
- "Taken" (as GM Grimm)
- Digital Tears: E-Mail From Purgatory (2004) (as Jet-Jaguar)
- Scars and Memories (2005)
- American Hunger (2006)
- MF Grimm & Stricknine present...The Order Of The Baker: Gingerbread Man Mixtape (2007) (with Toaster Entertainment)
- The Hunt For The Gingerbread Man (2007) (with Class A Records)
- Story (2009)
- You Only Live Twice (2010)
- Supreme Excellence (2010)
- American Hunger Rebirth, Vol. 2: Trials, Tribulations, Humiliation and Elevation (2019)

Monsta Island Czars

- Escape from Monsta Island! (2003) (with Metal Face Records)

Mudville

- The Glory of Man is Not in Vogue (2005) (with Slurry Music & Rock Day By Day)

The Nobodies

- Now Culture (2003)

Parallel Thought

- "Drugs, Liquor, Sex & Cigarettes" (2006)

Prophetix

- High Risk (2002) (with Asylum Entertainment)
- "High Risk" (Sampler) (2003)

Rob Swift

- Who Sampled This? (2003)

Rodan

- Theophany: The Book of Elevations (2004)

Serengeti

- Noodle-Arm Whimsy (2005)
- "Fast Living / Breakfast of Champions" (2005)
- Gasoline Rainbows (2006)

Stronghold

- Stronghold Mixtape, Vol. 2 (2004)

Various Artists Compilations

- A Piece of the Action (2001)
- On Top of the World (2002)
- Hartt of the City (2005)
- Illatron Underworld Mixtape (2011)
