= Good Morning Vietnam (disambiguation) =

Good Morning, Vietnam is a 1987 war comedy film.

Good Morning Vietnam may refer to:

- Good Morning Vietnam (EP), a 2012 extended play by MF Grimm and Drasar Monumental, followed by its sequels:
  - Good Morning Vietnam 2: The Golden Triangle, a 2013 collaborative album
  - Good Morning Vietnam 3: The Phoenix Program, a 2014 collaborative album
