= Special Herbs + Spices Volume 1 =

Studio album by MF Doom and MF Grimm
- Released: 11 May 2004
- Studio: Powerhouse Studios, NYC
- Genre: Underground hip-hop
- Length: 50:42 (CD); 45:43 (Vinyl)
- Label: Day By Day Entertainment
- Producer: MF Doom

MF Doom chronology
Madvillainy (2004)	Special Herbs + Spices Volume 1 (2004)	VV:2 (2004)

MF Grimm chronology
Digital Tears: E-mail from Purgatory (2004)	Special Herbs + Spices Volume 1 (2004)	Scars & Memories (2005)

Professional ratings
Review scores
Source	Rating
AllMusic	4/5 stars
cokemachineglow	76%
Hip-Hop Elements	9/10
Stylus Magazine	B−

Special Herbs + Spices Volume 1 is the second collaborative album released by American rappers MF Doom and MF Grimm, released in 2004 on Grimm's own Day By Day Entertainment label. Unlike their previous works, this CD is solely focused on MF Grimm's rhyming over MF Doom's production. The first ingredient of each song title is a reference to the corresponding track from Doom's Special Herbs series of instrumental albums. The tracks on the album were composed as freestyles by MF Grimm with many being written on the spot prior to recording. This reflects Grimm's past as a prolific and decorated battle rapper. Due to the duo's falling out after the release of this album, it is the last record to be released collaboratively.

The album was released prior to and in promotion of MF Grimm's triple-album American Hunger. The last track, "My Love" was originally slated to be released on American Hunger, but was removed and replaced with the track "Still My Love" due to MF Grimm's beef with MF Doom.

== Track listing ==
=== CD release ===
No.	Title	Length
1.	"Intro" (performed by Fat Man Scoop)	2:18
2.	"Arabic Gum + Ajowan = No Snakes Alive Pt. 3"	2:56
3.	"Calamus + Star Anise = Superhero"	2:31
4.	"Dragons Blood + Cayenne = 1000 Degrees"	4:04
5.	"Dragons Blood Resin + Ginger = Warpaint"	2:02
6.	"Benzoin Gum + Asafoetida = 10 Years Later"	3:00
7.	"Red #40 + Wasabi = Bottle Rocket"	3:55
8.	"Bergamot + Sumac = Rain Blood Pt. 2"	3:27
9.	"Kava Kava Root + Poppy Seeds = Stress Box"	3:24
10.	"Styrax Gum + Nutmeg = Tick Tick Pt. 2"	3:30
11.	"Mugwort + Cinnamon = Shifting Lanes" (featuring Kurious)	2:57
12.	"Horehound + Sesame Seeds = Tonight's Show" (featuring Bashton the Invizabul Mang & Lord Smog of M.I.C.)	3:10
13.	"Outro" (performed by Fat Man Scoop)	0:57
14.	"My Love" (Bonus track)	12:30
Total length:		50:42

=== Vinyl release ===
No.	Title	Length
1.	"Intro" (performed by Fat Man Scoop)	2:18
2.	"Arabic Gum + Ajowan = No Snakes Allowed Pt. 3"	2:56
3.	"Calamus + Star Anise = Superhero"	2:31
4.	"Dragons Blood + Cayenne = 1000 Degrees"	4:04
5.	"Dragons Blood Resin + Ginger = Warpaint"	2:02
6.	"Benzoin Gum + Asafoetida = 10 Years Later"	3:00
7.	"Red #40 + Wasabi = Bottle Rocket"	3:55
8.	"Bergamot + Sumac = Rain Blood Pt. 2"	3:27
9.	"Kava Kava Root + Poppy Seeds = Stress Box"	3:24
10.	"Styrax Gum + Nutmeg = Tick Tick Pt. 2"	3:30
11.	"Mugwort + Cinnamon = Shifting Lanes" (featuring Kurious)	2:57
12.	"Horehound + Sesame Seeds = Tonight's Show" (featuring Bashton the Invizabul Mang & Lord Smog of M.I.C.)	3:10
13.	"My Love"	3:41
14.	"Summon All Monsters"	3:50
15.	"Outro" (performed by Fat Man Scoop)	0:57
Total length:		45:43

== Personnel ==
Credits adapter from album's liner notes.

Personnel

- MF Doom – production
- MF Grimm – performances
- J Marty – engineering
- Percy Carey – executive producer
- Daniel Dumile – executive producer
- Azar Shahsavarani – executive producer
- DJ Fisher – executive producer (Note: DJ Fisher is only credited on the CD release of the album.)

Additional personnel

- tadah – artwork
- Za'tar – herbs & spices
