= I Got Needs =

I Got Needs may refer to:

- "I Got Needs", a 1997 television episode in the first season of Bump in the Night
- "I Got Needs", a 1995 song on American rapper Count Bass D's album Pre-Life Crisis
