= The Downfall of Ibliys: A Ghetto Opera =

The Downfall Of Ibliys: A Ghetto Opera

Studio album by MF Grimm
- Released: January 12, 2002
- Recorded: 2000–2001
- Genre: Hip hop
- Length: 47:41
- Label: Metal Face; Day By Day
- Producer: Cas; Count Bass D; DJ Eli; dminor; Dr. Butcher; Metal Fingers; Protest

MF Grimm chronology
MF EP (2000)	The Downfall Of Ibliys: A Ghetto Opera (2002)	Digital Tears: E-mail from Purgatory (2004)

Professional ratings
Review scores
Source	Rating
Pitchfork	8.3/10
RapReviews	7/10

The Downfall of Ibliys: A Ghetto Opera is the full-length debut studio album by American rapper MF Grimm. It was released on January 12, 2002, through Metalface/Day by Day Entertainment.

The album was produced by Metal Fingers, Count Bass D, Dr. Butcher, Cas, DJ Eli, dminor and Protest. It features guest appearances from fellow Monsta Island Czars members MF Doom and Megalon, and Count Bass D.

All the tracks on the album are original, except for "Break 'Em Off", which appeared on the MF EP collaboration with MF Doom.

Grimm was sentenced to life imprisonment in 2000 for narcotics and conspiracy offences. Paying a one-day bail of $100,000, he recorded The Downfall of Ibliys: A Ghetto Opera in those twenty-four hours. Grimm also said in an interview that the album is mainly a lot of questions he had about his life and that his other albums are answers to life. Studying law while incarcerated, Grimm appealed his sentences and filed counter-suits, with the ultimate effect that his sentence was commuted to three years and he was released in 2003.

The album is widely considered to be an underground classic alongside MF Doom's Operation: Doomsday and Count Bass D's Dwight Spitz.

The Downfall of Ibliys: A Ghetto Opera was, along with Digital Tears: E-mail from Purgatory, re-issued in 2010 after being out of print for many years.

== Track listing ==
No.	Title	Writer(s)	Producer(s)	Length
1.	"Alpha" (featuring Count Bass D)	Dwight Farrell; Oriana Farrell	Count Bass D; Metal Fingers (co.)	0:35
2.	"Time and Space"	Percy Carey	DJ Rob A	2:51
3.	"Life and Death"	Carey	Metal Fingers	4:21
4.	"Freedom"	Carey	Dr. Butcher; Metal Fingers (co.)	3:07
5.	"Foolish" (featuring Megalon and MF Doom)	Carey; Thomas Rollins; Daniel Dumile	Metal Fingers	3:15
6.	"Together"	Carey	dminor	1:58
7.	"Break Em Off"	Carey	Cas	4:04
8.	"Rain Blood" (featuring Megalon)	Rollins	Metal Fingers	3:59
9.	"Voices, Pt. 0"	Carey	Metal Fingers	1:57
10.	"Voices, Pt. 1" (featuring MF Doom)	Dumile	Metal Fingers	1:54
11.	"Yes You Are (It's Only a Movie)"	Carey	DJ Eli	2:25
12.	"I.B.'s"	Carey	Metal Fingers	3:53
13.	"To All My Comrades"	Carey	Metal Fingers	2:05
14.	"Howl"	Carey	Dr. Butcher; Metal Fingers (co.)	2:27
15.	"Words"	Carey	Count Bass D	3:24
16.	"Teach the Babies"	Carey	Protest	2:28
17.	"Omega"	D. Farrell	Count Bass D	2:58
Total length:				47:41
