= Beg, Steal or Borrow (disambiguation) =

"Beg, Steal or Borrow" is a 1972 song by The New Seekers.

Beg, Steal or Borrow or Beg, Borrow and Steal may also refer to:

== Music ==
- "Beg, Steal or Borrow" (Ray LaMontagne song), 2010
- "Beg, Steal or Borrow", a song by Berlin from the 1984 album Love Life
- "Beg, Borrow and Steal", a 1962 song by Vernon Harrell
- "Beg, Borrow and Steal" a 1967 song by Ohio Express
- Beg, Borrow and Steal, a 2010 album by Cookies 'N' Beans
- Beg, Borrow, and Steal, an unreleased album by Neon Hitch
- Beg, Borrow, Steal, a 2004 album by Army of Freshmen
- "Beg, Borrow or Steal", a song by Hughes/Thrall from the 1982 album Hughes/Thrall
- "Beg, Borrow, or Steal", a 1965 song by The Gentlemen
- Beg, Borrow or Steal (musical), 1960

== Other uses ==
- Beg, Borrow or Steal, a 1937 American comedy film
- Beg, Borrow ... Or Steal, a 1973 TV movie directed by David Lowell Rich
- Beg, Borrow, Steal, a 2009 memoir by Michael Greenberg

== See also ==
- BB Steal (Beg Borrow Steal), an Australian Rock band
- Begborrowsteel, a 2005 EP by Count Bass D
- Beg & Borrow, a 2015 album by Battlefield Band
