= System D-128 =

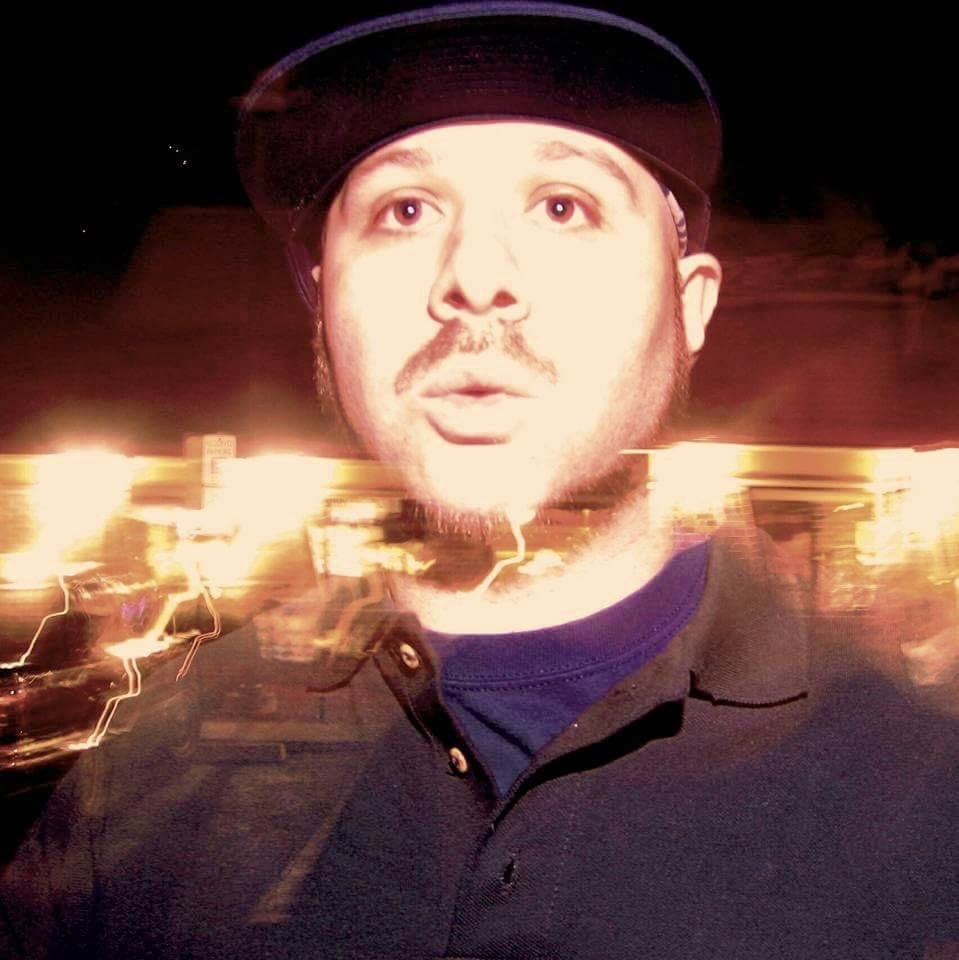
- System D-128 at a performance

Background information
- Also known as: Duey FM
- Origin: New York City, United States
- Website: stemspot.com

System D-128, also known as Duey FM, is a music video and film director, editor, video artist, new media artist and producer.

== Career ==
In 2004, he created a DVD to come with the first official Diplo record "Florida" off Big Dada / Ninja Tune Records. The album was pressed twice, first with a CD and the second with a CD & DVD. Before the Diplo Florida DVD, there was another DVD that surfaced called Diplo Banned in Libya. It was released by Money Studies, the first label to release a solo project by Diplo under his original DJ name Diplodocus. It was a 45 rpm record called "Thingamajawn". There is also a music video for the single, that System D-128 directed as well. It is similar to the Florida DVD Banned in Libya, as it is an experimental audio and video mix of some of Diplo's music and other sources that are unknown. System D-128 also collaborated on a song with Diplo called "Blue Beards Dreams" which was later used by MF Doom on the Viktor Vaughn release Venomous Villain. The newer version of the track was then titled "Back End". System D-128 also produced the intro and an interlude for that particular record.

System D-128 helped Diplo with the introduction of Mad Decent, the name and first conception of the company and logo was first seen on the Florida release, along with Hollertronix and Pinniped Science. D-128 also worked on initial aboriginal Heaps Decent promotional projects with OBEY, Ed Banger Records, Apple, Ableton Live and Scratch Live in New Zealand and Australia.

In 2008, System D-128 had a full-page article in the December URB Magazine Issue #156. It covered numerous projects he was creatively involved in as, as well as upcoming video projects.

== Discography and videography ==
12-Inch 3-D Single

- (2007) Acid Girlzzz Bonus Beat

Audio projects

- Deathstar 1
- Brian Confusion
- Blue Beards Dreams feat. Diplodocus
- Back End feat. Diplo & Viktor Vaughn / MF Doom
- Viktormizor
- Strange New Day
- Mad Decent Worldwide Radio #9 (Kill Yourself)
- Mad Decent Worldwide Radio #20 (Kill Yourself Again)
- Mad Decent Worldwide Radio #38 (Kill Yourself 3-D)

AV projects

- Subterranean Videodrome DVD
- Diplo "Banned In Libya" DVD
- Diplo "Florida" DVD
- Safety 1st DVD H is for Hollertronix
- White Label TV DVD
- Well Deep DVD "Video Megamix"
- On that Blue **** DVD
- Mad Decent Video Podcast Series

Music videos

- Diplodocus - Thingamajawn
- Diplo - Indian Thick Jawn
- Bigg Jus - Silver Back Mountain King
- Bigg Jus - Illustrations of Hieronymus Bosch
- Percee P - Put It On The Line
- Madvillain - Shadows of Tomorrow
- King Geedorah - The Final Hour
- Jon Kennedy - Demons
- Ron Rico & The Letter People - Miss A
- Adrian Michna - Triple Chrome Dipped
