= Begborrowsteel =

BEGBORROWSTEEL

EP by Count Bass D
- Released: February 21, 2005
- Recorded: 2004–2005
- Genres: Jazz rap, experimental
- Length: 29:30
- Labels: Jazzy Sport, RAMP Recordings, Octave
- Producer: Count Bass D

Count Bass D chronology
Dwight Spitz (2002)	BEGBORROWSTEEL (2005)	Act Your Waist Size. (2006)

Professional ratings
Review scores
Source	Rating
Tiny Mix Tapes	4/5 stars
Dusted Reviews	favorable
cokemachineglow	(65%)
The A.V. Club	favorable

BEGBORROWSTEEL is an LP by American hip hop artist and multi-instrumentalist Count Bass D, his third LP. It was released on August 21, 2005 on Jazzy Sport.

The LP was first released in Japan on Octave, on February 21, 2004. The Japan release includes four exclusive bonus tracks. It was released in Germany on RAMP Recordings the same year as a two-vinyl packaging, one containing the original album and the second containing the instrumentals of each song. The album released again in Germany with three new tracks added, and "Like a Pimp" omitted.

== Track listing ==
No.	Title	Length
1.	"Bullets Hit Brains"	1:58
2.	"Doxology"	0:36
3.	"The Mingus Sextet"	1:07
4.	"Nina & Weldon"	0:49
5.	"Gimme a Gig"	0:32
6.	"Drug Abusage"	1:23
7.	"Kumbuka Watu Penda Pesa (Part 1)"	2:16
8.	"Kumbuka Watu Penda Pesa (Part 2)"	1:33
9.	"Des Fauses Impressions"	1:34
10.	"Dollar Bill"	2:39
11.	"Down Easy"	3:39
12.	"New Edition Karaoke"	2:03
13.	"Low Batteries"	0:55
14.	"No. 3 Pencil"	1:38
15.	"Body by Jake"	3:22
16.	"Canerow Waltz"	3:26

Japanese bonus tracks
No.	Title	Length
14.	"Like a Pimp"
15.	"Dwight Will Do Anything (Part. 1)"
16.	"Full Blooded West Indian (Part. 1)"
17.	"Full Blooded West Indian (Part. 2)"
