= Electric Circus (album) =

Studio album by Common
- Released: December 10, 2002
- Recorded: 2002
- Studio: Electric Lady (New York)
- Genres: Hip-hop; alternative hip-hop
- Length: 73:26
- Label: MCA
- Producers: Questlove (also exec.); Common (exec.); Derek Dudley (exec.); James Poyser (also assoc.); J Dilla (also assoc.); Pino Palladino; The Neptunes; Karriem Riggins; Jeff Lee Johnson

Common chronology
Like Water for Chocolate (2000)	Electric Circus (2002)	Be (2005)

Singles from Electric Circus
- 1. "Come Close" Released: November 5, 2002; 2. "I Got a Right Ta" Released: December 13, 2002

Electric Circus is the fifth studio album by American rapper Common, released on December 10, 2002, on the now-defunct MCA Records. The album was highly anticipated and praised by many critics for its ambitious vision. However, it was not as commercially successful as his previous album, Like Water for Chocolate, selling under 300,000 copies. An eclectic album, Electric Circus features fusions of several genres such as hip-hop, pop, rock, electronic, and neo soul. "I wasn't feeling hip hop," the rapper remarked. "So my motivation for that album were other genres of music, like Pink Floyd and Jimi Hendrix. It wasn't hip hop." This was Common's second and last album for MCA, as well as the final album released under the label, which would soon be merged into Geffen Records a year later.

== Music ==
The label hadn't heard my music until I got near the end of the album. At one point it was like 'yo, man, you departed so far from the last album... the music you're making ain't really conducive to what's going on in modern music right now'.

— Common, Chicago Sun-Times interview

Common worked with a large (and eclectic) number of musicians on Electric Circus. Among them were Mary J. Blige (who provided vocals for the album's lead single, "Come Close"), The Neptunes, Lætitia Sadier (of Stereolab), CeeLo Green, J Dilla, Bilal and Jill Scott. The music on Electric Circus challenges the boundaries of the hip-hop genre in a similar fashion to The Roots' Phrenology (2002) and Outkast's Speakerboxxx/The Love Below (2003). This is especially the case on tracks like the grungy "Electric Wire Hustler Flower" (featuring P.O.D.'s Sonny Sandoval in the chorus), the abstract "Aquarius", and the electronic "New Wave". Erykah Badu joins Common for a duet on "Jimi Was A Rock Star", which is a dedication to Jimi Hendrix. The second Neptunes collaboration on the record, the cross-genre "I Got A Right Ta", is a musical departure from the styles of both artists, and features Pharrell singing the hook in a blues-inspired style. A triumphant sounding Common proclaims himself "the only cat in hip hop that can go into a thrift shop, bring that get up to the ghetto and get props". The song was placed on the B-Side of "Come Close".

"Between Me, You & Liberation", in which Common discusses sexual abuse and its effects on a young woman, confronting his homophobia after learning about the sexuality of a longtime friend, and the loss of a relative to cancer, contains themes considered to be wholly unusual for a rap song at the time of its release, and is, perhaps, the rapper's most vulnerable moment on record. About "Liberation..." PopMatters wrote that it's "one of those rare occasions when a male hip-hop artist owns up to his investment in some of the genre's more unsavory sexual politics". Musically, the song is very downbeat and moody, and features a guest spot from rapper/singer/producer CeeLo Green (making this the pair's third collaboration after One Day It'll All Make Sense's "G.O.D.", and Like Water For Chocolate's "A Song For Assata").

Following LWFC's tributes to Fela Kuti, and Assata Shakur, Electric Circus pays homage to someone altogether more familiar (Jimi Hendrix) on "Jimi Was A Rock Star". The 8 minute-plus song is a duet between Common and his then-girlfriend Erykah Badu, which gradually builds up into its cryptic, chanting finale. This song is Common's first all-singing performance. The center-piece of the album, the epic "Heaven Somewhere", features 6 vocalists who all give insight into what their interpretation of Heaven is. Common's father Lonnie Lynn ends the affair with an introspective look at his ideal place.

== Reception ==
=== Critical ===
Professional ratings
Aggregate scores
Source	Rating
Metacritic	80/100
Review scores
Source	Rating
AllMusic	4/5 stars
Blender	2/5 stars
Entertainment Weekly	A
The Guardian	5/5 stars
NME	8/10
Pitchfork	6.5/10 (2003); 8.4/10 (2017)
Q	4/5 stars
Rolling Stone	3/5 stars
Spin	6/10
The Village Voice	B

The album's style tended to divide critics; most praised its ambitious vision while some criticized it for the same reason. Most of the criticism tended to revolve around the album's experimental nature. Some felt Common had strayed too far from his previous sound. Longtime Common fans also viewed his relationship with Erykah Badu as having an overly experimental influence on him, while some critics compared the album to Marvin Gaye's I Want You and Richard Ashcroft's Human Conditions, both of which were experimental works that initially received mixed criticism. In a 2003 review, Nick Southall of Stylus Magazine gave the album a D+ and wrote:

So, is this genius or is this madness? As enjoyable as it is on occasion, I’m inclined to side with the latter. Marvin Gaye tried it. Richard Ashcroft tried it. One of them did a fantastic job, the other did not. Common sits somewhere between the two. Odd. Very, very odd.

Official reviews were mostly positive. "Pushing past the accepted boundaries of contemporary black pop" is how PopMatters described the album by giving it all ten stars. Likewise, Playlouder gave it four stars out of five, calling it "a brilliant, visionary album", as did Rolling Stone who only gave it three stars out of five and saw it as "breaking hip-hop rules with a freewheeling fearlessness." Ink Blot Magazine's Matt Cibula called it his "favorite record of 2002". The Independent gave it a favorable review and called it "is the most heartening recent development in hip hop, the kind of album that might help lead the genre out of its present darkness." The Village Voice gave it an average review and said it "sounds chocolatey and recombinant even when it doth protest the Enlightened Guy angle too much." RapReviews gave it a score of 7 out of 10 and said, "Last time around on 'Like Water for Chocolate' Common still had his Chicago flows, just spiced a little differently with Okayplayer oregano. This could and SHOULD have worked again, but the mix this time is bitter and leaves me feeling a little salty. The 'Electric Circus' could rightly have been called the 'Eclectic Circus' for the unconventional way it tries to combine disparate elements into a cohesive whole."

In the decades since release, critical reappraisals of Electric Circus have noted the album's artistic significance, with Pitchfork describing the album as providing "the groundwork for what we see black popular music as now [...] a flawed but classic album". Others have noted its enduring influence on hip-hop, with Patrick Corcoran considering Electric Circus as one of two albums — the other being The New Danger by Mos Def — to demonstrate that hip-hop had no limits. Corcoran concludes that artists like Kendrick Lamar would not have been "inspired to craft the transcendent" To Pimp a Butterfly without Electric Circus. Electric Circus was also chosen by Record Collector for inclusion in their 70 Landmark Albums of the Last 70 Years

=== Commercial ===
Despite the critical approval, the record debuted at #47 on the Billboard 200 chart, 31 spots lower than Like Water for Chocolate's highest chart position. With "Come Close" as the only single, the album quickly fell off the charts altogether, and MCA Records halted any further promotion. Part of the reason for its lack of promotion was MCA's absorption under Geffen Records in the summer of 2003, a mere six to seven months after the album's release. Since both labels were under the Universal Music Group, Common's record contract would be carried over to Geffen, which itself was a subsidiary of another Universal Music label, Interscope Records, whose co-founder Jimmy Iovine oversaw the direction of both labels. Either way, the handling of Electric Circus (an already under-performing album) was neglected. The lack of promotion may have also led to only 295,000 copies being sold based on 2005 Nielsen SoundScan statistics.

In a 2006 interview concurrent with the release of The Roots' album Game Theory, Questlove, the album's executive producer, maintained that Common's relationship with Erykah Badu had little influence on the album and stated that the greater influence was the recording atmosphere at the famous Electric Lady Studios (built by Jimi Hendrix) and the group of artists that Common was collaborating with at the time:

To understand that record is to understand the history of what Electric Lady Studios was to this whole Soulquarian unit. We started off in the spring of '96 and that's where we created Things Fall Apart for The Roots, D'Angelo's Voodoo, Erykah's Mama's Gun, Common's Like Water for Chocolate, the Black Star record, Mos Def's record, Bilal's record, Musiq's album... Pretty much the left of center of hip-hop was using that place as much more than a studio. That place was like a clubhouse: you'd [go] even if you didn't have a session, just hopin' somethin' would come up.

== Album cover ==
The album's cover appears to be a nod to "Midnight Marauders", the third studio album by American hip-hop group A Tribe Called Quest, released on November 9, 1993. Also, The Beatles' 1967 album Sgt. Pepper's Lonely Hearts Club Band, another work known for its experimental nature. The images (a mixture of known personalities, personal friends, and family of the artist) represent those directly or indirectly involved in, or influential to the making of the album. The 87 people depicted in the photos are:

Common (in the center), (from top-left to bottom-right) Prince, Leroy Matthais, Simon Johns, Chad Hugo, Larenz Tate, Stic.man, Pharrell, Mattie Turner, Kenyetta Snyder, Big Daddy Kane, Vinia Mojica, Erykah Badu, Rahsaan Abraham, James Poyser, Tim Gane, DJ Dumi, Questlove, Black Thought, Grandma Gipson, Marie Daulne, Richard Pryor, Marlon Everett, Jay Dee (J Dilla), Mary Campbell, Steef Van De Gevel, M-1, Don "Babatunde" Eaton, Tye Tribbett, Pino Palladino, Abiodun Oyewole, Andrew Dosunmu, Umar Bin Hassan, Louis Farrakhan, Joseph Sharrieff, Steve Mandel, Jimi The Cat, Dartanian Donaldson, Mary Hansen, Steve Hess, Morgane Lhote, Kimberly Jones, Aunt Stella, Q-Tip, Marc Baptiste, Grandma Mable Lynn, Derek Dudley, Uncle Charles, Uncle Steve, John Hancock, Bob Power, Koryan Wright, Ashaka Givens, Dwayne Lyle, Eevin Wright, Russ Elevado, Marcus Murray, Barbara Sims, Rachelle, CeeLo Green, Jill Scott, Bayatae Abraham, Charlie Malone, Jeff Lee Johnson, Assata Shakur, Leslie Sims, Angela Murray, Kolleen "Queenie" Wright, Lætitia Sadier, Cousin Bianca, Omoye Lynn, Mary J. Blige, Grandma Elva Brown, Millie Malone, Chris Webber, Bilal, Lonnie "Pops" Lynn, Jimi Hendrix, George Daniels, Fred Hampton Jr., Fred Hampton, Omar, Seven, Karriem Riggins, Ma, and Ralph.

== Track listing ==
Writing credits by Allmusic.com.

No.	Title	Writer(s)	Producer(s)	Length
1.	"Ferris Wheel" (featuring Vinia Mojica and Marie Daulne)	Lonnie Lynn; Ahmir Thompson; James Poyser; Vinia Mojica; Marie Daulne	?uestlove; James Poyser	2:48
2.	"Soul Power"	Lynn; James Yancey; Thompson; Poyser	J Dilla; ?uestlove^{[a]}; James Poyser^{[a]}	4:38
3.	"Aquarius" (featuring Bilal)	Lynn; Thompson; Poyser; Yancey; Pino Palladino; Erykah Badu	?uestlove; James Poyser; J Dilla; Pino Palladino	4:54
4.	"Electric Wire Hustler Flower" (featuring Sonny Sandoval)	Lynn; Poyser; Yancey	James Poyser; J Dilla	5:54
5.	"The Hustle" (featuring Omar and Dart Chillz)	Lynn; Karriem Riggins; Omar Lye-Fook; Dartanian Donaldson	Karriem Riggins	4:20
6.	"Come Close" (featuring Mary J. Blige)	Lynn; Pharrell Williams; Chad Hugo	The Neptunes	4:35
7.	"New Wave" (featuring Lætitia Sadier)	Lynn; Thompson; Poyser; Yancey; Lætitia Sadier	?uestlove; James Poyser; J Dilla	5:08
8.	"Star *69 (PS With Love)" (featuring Bilal)	Lynn; Thompson; Poyser; Yancey	?uestlove; James Poyser; J Dilla	5:30
9.	"I Got a Right Ta" (featuring Pharrell Williams)	Lynn; Williams; Hugo	The Neptunes	4:54
10.	"Between Me, You and Liberation" (featuring Cee Lo Green)	Lynn; Thompson; Poyser; Yancey; Palladino; Thomas Callaway	?uestlove; James Poyser; J Dilla; Pino Palladino	6:23
11.	"I Am Music" (featuring Jill Scott)	Lynn; Thompson; Poyser; Yancey; Palladino; Jeff Lee Johnson; Jill Scott	?uestlove; James Poyser; J Dilla; Pino Palladino; Johnson	5:21
12.	"Jimi Was a Rock Star" (featuring Erykah Badu)	Lynn; Thompson; Poyser; Yancey; Palladino; Johnson; Badu	?uestlove; James Poyser; J Dilla; Pino Palladino; Johnson	8:32
13.	"Heaven Somewhere" (featuring Omar, Cee Lo Green, Bilal, Jill Scott, Mary J. Blige, Erykah Badu and Lonnie "Pops" Lynn)	Lynn; Thompson; Poyser; Palladino; Lye-Fook; Bilal Oliver; Scott; Mary J. Blige; Badu	?uestlove; James Poyser; Pino Palladino	10:24

2003 DVD
No.	Title	Notes	Length
1.	"Come Close" (with Mary J. Blige)	Music video	4:18
2.	"The Making of Come Close"	Short documentary, explaining the making of the video
3.	"Electric Circus"	Studio session footage

Notes

- ^{^[a]} signifies a co-producer.

== Personnel ==
By Allmusic.com.

- Jon Adler – assistant engineer (3)
- Erykah Badu – background vocals (3)
- DJ Babu – scratches (4)
- Marc Baptiste – photography
- Anthony Bell – engineer (1, 10, 13)
- Damon Bennett – flute (10)
- Bilal – background vocals (3)
- Mary J. Blige – background vocals (6)
- Jim Bottari – engineer (8)
- Andy Brooks – assistant mix engineer (2–5, 7, 10, 11)
- Josh Butler – Cee Lo Green vocal engineer (13)
- Jeff Chestek – engineer (2, 3), assistant engineer (8), strings engineer (10, 13)
- Andrew Coleman – engineer (6, 9)
- Common – executive producer
- Tom Coyne – mastering
- Timothy Day – engineer (4, 7, 8, 10, 13)
- J Dilla – associate executive producer, programming (2, 3), drums (4, 7, 8), bass (4), electric guitar (4), Moog (12)
- Derek Dudley – executive producer
- Russell "The Dragon" Elevado – mixing (1, 12, 13)
- Todd Fairall – engineer (2–5, 7, 8, 10, 11, 13)
- Vincent Gardner – trombone (11)
- Larry Gold – string arrangement (10, 13)
- Kenny Gravillis – art direction, design
- Nick Howard – assistant engineer (6, 9)
- Bobbi Humphrey – flute (10)
- Femi Jiya – engineer (8)
- Jef Lee Johnson – guitar (1, 3, 10–13)
- Scott Kieklak – Cee Lo Green vocal engineer (13)
- Dylan Koski-Budabin – assistant engineer (2–5, 7, 8, 10, 13)
- Dustin Kreidler – assistant mix engineer (8)
- Joe Lepinski – assistant engineer (8)
- Steve Mandel – engineer (1, 3, 5, 8, 10–13)
- Storm Martinez – engineer (4)
- Mark McLaughlin – assistant engineer (11)
- Shinobu Mitsuoka – assistant engineer (1, 7, 10, 11, 13)
- Ryan Moys – engineer (8, 11)
- Pino Palladino – bass (2, 10, 12, 13)
- Nicholas Payton – trumpet (11)
- James Poyser – associate executive producer, keyboards (1–4, 7, 8, 10, 12, 13), piano (11, guitar (4), background vocals (2, 11), handclaps (2)
- Bob Power – mixing (2–5, 7, 8, 10, 11)
- Prince – keyboards and guitar (8)
- Steve Russell – Sonny Sandoval vocal engineer (4)
- Joe Sinista – scratches (5)
- Chris Steinmetz – engineer (5)
- Phil Tan – mixing (6)
- Greg Tardy – cornet (11)
- Matt Taylor – design
- Shawn Taylor – assistant engineer (5, 8)
- Ahmir "?uestlove" Thompson – executive producer, drums (1, 3, 10–13), handclaps (2), mixing (8, 10–12), assistant mix engineer (2, 4, 7)
- Mike Tocci – engineer (1, 7, 10, 11, 13)
- Tye Tribbett and G.A. – background vocals (4, 13)
- Steef Van De Gevel – assistant engineer (11, 12, assistant mix engineer (1, 12, 13)
- Pat Viala – mixing (9)
- Franklin Walker – percussion (3)
- Blair Wells – digital editing
- Pharrell Williams – background vocals (6)

== Chart history ==
=== Weekly charts ===
Chart (2002)	Peak position
US Billboard 200	47
US Top R&B/Hip-Hop Albums (Billboard)	9

=== Year-end charts ===
Chart (2003)	Position
US Top R&B/Hip-Hop Albums (Billboard)	76

=== Singles ===
Year	Song	Peak positions		
Year	Song	US Hot 100	US R&B	US Rap
2002	"Come Close"	65	21	18

== See also ==
- Love for Sale (album), an album by Bilal, also recorded around this time at Electric Lady Studios and featuring Common
