= Come Close =

Single by Common featuring Mary J. Blige

from the album Electric Circus
- Released: November 5, 2002
- Genre: Hip-hop; neo soul
- Length: 4:35
- Label: MCA
- Songwriters: Lonnie Lynn; Pharrell Williams; Charles Hugo
- Producer: The Neptunes

Common singles chronology
"While I'm Dancin'" (2002)	"Come Close" (2002)	"Where I'm Goin'" (2003)

Mary J. Blige singles chronology
"Rainy Dayz" (2002)	"Come Close" (2002)	"Love @ 1st Sight" (2003)

"Come Close" is a single by rapper Common featuring guest vocals by Mary J. Blige. The song is produced by Pharrell and Chad Hugo's production team, the Neptunes. Peaking at #65 on the Billboard Hot 100, "Come Close" is the only song from Common's 2002 album Electric Circus to make an appearance on the national music chart. It was released in conjunction with a promo video directed by Sanaa Hamri and Questlove of the Roots. The song's lyrics are a loving marriage proposition to Common's then girlfriend Erykah Badu. Jack LV Isles of AllMusic describes it as a "slow-paced dialogue [...] that borders on typical," but will inevitably be a commercial success. Mark Anthony Neal of PopMatters comments on its mainstream sound saying that it's not a "sell-out" track, just a "fly love song" in which the Neptunes "brought their A-game."

== Music video ==
In the video for the song, Common visits his girlfriend, a deaf woman (although this is not mentioned in the song itself). As she looks outside of her window, Common raps the verses to the song, while using cardboard signs to communicate the meanings of the words to her. After the second verse, he eventually proposes with the lines "I'm tired of the fast lane, I want you to have my last name." His girlfriend gladly accepts and they then drive off.

In the woman's room, behind her bed, there is a poster written in sign language. If one looks closely, it spells out "COMMON".

This video was nominated at the MTV Video Music Awards 2003 for the MTV2 Award, but it lost to AFI's "Girl's Not Grey."

== Remixes ==
The main remix of this song is titled "Come Close (Remix) (Closer)." It features guest vocals by Erykah Badu, Pharrell and Q-Tip. Produced by J Dilla, it utilizes a sample of "Daylight" by RAMP. It was also remixed by the German dance group Boozoo Bajou. This remix is about six minutes long and can be found on their 2003 album Remixes. In 2003, hip hop producer Blackbeard also remixed "Come Close" and released it as a single. In 2005, Dutch hip-hop producer Nicolay remixed it for his album The Dutch Masters, Vol. 1. Skillz used the beat for the 2002 Rap Up.

== Track listing ==
=== CD single ===
1. "Come Close Remix (Closer)" (4:37)
2. "Come Close (Album Version)" (4:23)

=== 12-inch single ===
"Come Close to Me"/"I Got a Right Ta" 12-inch single

==== A-side ====
1. "Come Close to Me (LP)"
2. "Come Close to Me (instrumental)"
3. "Come Close to Me (a cappella)"

==== B-side ====
1. "I Got a Right Ta (LP)"
2. "I Got a Right Ta (instrumental)"
3. "I Got a Right Ta (a cappella)"

=== "Come Close Remix (Closer)" CD single ===
"Come Close Remix (Closer)" CD single

1. "Come Close Remix (Closer) (Main)" (4:37)
2. "Come Close Remix (Closer) (instrumental)" (4:37)
3. "Come Close (Main)" (4:23)
4. "The Hustle (clean)" (4:20)
5. "Aquarius (clean)" (4:53)
6. "Come Close (Multimedia Track)" (3:48)

=== "Come Close Remix" (Closer)" 12-inch single ===
"Come Close Remix (Closer)" 12-inch single

==== A-side ====
1. "Come Close Remix (Closer) (Main)" (4:37)
2. "Come Close Remix (Closer) (instrumental)" (4:37)
3. "Come Close Remix (Closer) (a cappella)" (5:11)

==== B-side ====
1. "The Hustle (clean)" (4:20)
2. "The Hustle (instrumental)" (4:19)
3. "Aquarius (clean)" (4:53)
4. "Aquarius (instrumental)" (4:53)

== Chart positions ==
Chart (2002–03)	Peak position
U.S. Billboard Hot 100	65
U.S. Billboard Hot R&B/Hip-Hop Singles & Tracks	21
U.S. Billboard Hot Rap Tracks	18

== See also ==
- List of Common songs
