= Dionté Boom =

American rapper

- Also known as: Jams DaBoombox, King Boom, Ervin Jams, Fat Boi
- Born: Ervin Dionté Harris; July 24, 1991 (age 35); Little Rock, Arkansas, United States
- Genres: Hip hop, electronic, funktronica, Nu Jazz, Jazztronica, Afrobeat
- Occupations: Rapper, record producer
- Instruments: Vocals, sampler, drum machine, programming, Guitar, Keyboard
- Years active: 2010–present
- Label: Naughty Tapes Records Day By Day Entertainment Culture Power 45
- Website: dionteboom.bandcamp.com

Ervin Dionté Harris (born July 24, 1991), better known by his stage name Dionté BOOM, is an American rapper-producer. He is currently based in Little Rock, and signed to Day By Day Entertainment.

== Career ==
Dionté BOOM released his debut mixtape, Concrete Lessons, in 2010. Beats Is Art (Prelude), was released by Day By Day Entertainment in 2011.

BOOM released the EP, In Motion in May 2013. In December 2014 his song "High Horse" was featured on Stones Throw Records "La 2 London" podcast. The Aswé A EP followed in December 2014. The song "Lickin'" was published by Arkansas Times in a 2014 issue of the journal Rock Candy, song "Fish Market" in a 2015 issue.

== Discography ==
=== Mixtapes ===
- Concrete Lessons (2010)
- Herbal Discussion (2010)
- Beats Is Art (Prelude) (2011)
- Beats Is Art (2011)
- Beats Is Art III (2011)
- Hammer Bite (2015)

=== EPs ===
- Herbal Discussion Vol. 2 (2013)
- In Motion (2013)
- Aswé A (2014)
- Mountains & Trails (2017)

=== Singles ===
- "Fat Boi Fat Boi" (2012) with KVZE
- "Nasty Narrative" (2012)
- "Lickin'" (2014)
- "Fish Market" (2015) with Celestaphone
- ''Still Got Sum'' (Freestyle) (2016)
- "Spring Cleaning'' (2017)
- "The News" (2017)
