= MF EP =

EP by MF Doom and MF Grimm
- Released: 28 November 2000
- Recorded: 1999–2000
- Genre: Underground hip-hop
- Length: 50:48
- Label: Brick Records
- Producers: MF Doom; Mister Jason; Fakts One; Cas; Ninja B; Que

MF Doom chronology
Black Bastards (with KMD) (2000)	MF EP (2000)	Take Me to Your Leader (2003)

MF Grimm chronology
MF EP (2000)	The Downfall of Ibliys: A Ghetto Opera (2002)

Professional ratings
Review scores
Source	Rating
RapReviews	7/10

MF EP is a split EP by rappers MF Doom and MF Grimm. It was released on the 28th of November 2000.

The song "Break Em Off" also appeared on MF Grimm's solo debut The Downfall of Ibliys: A Ghetto Opera.

== Track listing ==
Tracks 1–3 performed by MF Doom, tracks 4–7 performed by MF Grimm.

No.	Title	Writer(s)	Producer(s)	Length
1.	"Doomsday (Remix)"	D. Dumile; J. Katsohis	Mister Jason	3:11
2.	"No Snakes Alive" (featuring King Ghidra, Jet Jaguar and Rodan)	D. Dumile; P. Carey; A. Ford	MF Doom	3:34
3.	"Impostas"	D. Dumile	MF Doom; Ill Clown (co-prod.)	3:36
4.	"The Original (Remix)"	P. Carey; J. Goler	Fakts One	4:01
5.	"Break Em Off"	P. Carey	Cas	4:09
6.	"Dedicated"	P. Carey; D. Boylan; Que	Ninja B; Que	3:27
7.	"The Original"	P. Carey; D. Boylan	Ninja B	8:37
8.	"Doomsday (Remix)" (Instrumental)			3:07
9.	"No Snakes Alive" (Instrumental)			3:34
10.	"Impostas" (Instrumental)			4:01
11.	"The Original (Remix)" (Instrumental)			3:31
12.	"Break Em Off" (Instrumental)			3:45
13.	"Dedicated" (Instrumental)			3:27
14.	"The Original" (Instrumental)			3:31
Total length:				55:25

== Personnel ==
Credits are adapted from the EP's liner notes.

Artwork

- Karma – art direction, design
- Ryan Murphy – photography

Additional personnel

- John C. DeFalco – executive production
- Truth Elemental – executive production
- Papi D – executive production
