= While I'm Dancin' =

Single by Common and Prime

from the album Ground Original Presents: Claimstake
- Released: October 9, 2002
- Genre: Hip hop
- Length: 3:38
- Label: Echelon Records
- Songwriters: Lonnie Lynn, Michael P Delaney, William Tramontozzi
- Producers: DJ JS-1; Dub-L

Common singles chronology
"Love of My Life (An Ode to Hip-Hop)" (2002)	"While I'm Dancin'" (2002)	"Come Close" (2002)

"While I'm Dancin'" is a 2002 single by rappers Common and Prime. It is produced by DJ JS-1 and Dub-L, who put the song on their 2004 compilation Ground Original Presents: Claimstake. It can be found on mixtapes, such as DJ Food Stamp's Best of Common and DJ JS-1's The Common Collection.

== Track listing ==
=== A-side ===
1. "While I'm Dancin' (Clean w/ Vocal Hook)"
2. "While I'm Dancin' (Clean w/ Scratches)"
3. "While I'm Dancin' (Instrumental)"

=== B-side ===
1. "While I'm Dancin'" (Remix - Clean w/ Scratches)"
2. "While I'm Dancin'" (Remix - Instrumental)"

== See also ==
- List of Common songs
