= VV:2 =

Studio album by Viktor Vaughn
- Released: 3 August 2004
- Genre: Hip-hop
- Length: 35:25
- Labels: Insomniac, Inc.
- Producers: System D-128; Diplo; DiViNCi; Swamburger; Session 31; DJ I.N.C.; Dub-L

MF Doom chronology
Special Herbs + Spices Volume 1 (2004)	VV:2 (2004)	MM..FOOD (2004)

VV:2, also known as Venomous Villain, is the fourth studio album by British-American rapper and producer MF Doom, and the second and final album to be released under his alias Viktor Vaughn. It was released through Insomniac, Inc. on 3 August 2004.

== Critical reception ==
Professional ratings
Aggregate scores
Source	Rating
Metacritic	71/100
Review scores
Source	Rating
AllMusic	3.5/5 stars
Cokemachineglow	71%
LAS Magazine	8/10
No Ripcord	7/10
Pitchfork	6.9/10
Stylus Magazine	5/10
RapReviews	7.5/10
Tiny Mix Tapes	4/5
The Village Voice	A−

At Metacritic, which assigns a weighted average score out of 100 to reviews from mainstream critics, VV:2 received an average score of 71 based on 11 reviews, indicating "generally favorable reviews".

Exclaim!'s Thomas Quinlan found the album to be "a great follow-up to Vaudeville Villain", while noting that due to its short length and the presence of numerous guest performers, it nonetheless "leaves you wishing for a lot more Doom".

Critic Robert Christgau ranked the album at number 71 on his year-end "Dean's List".

== Track listing ==
No.	Title	Writer(s)	Producer(s)	Length
1.	"Viktormizer" (Intro)		System D-128	2:49
2.	"Back End"	Brian Korlofsky; Wesley Pentz; Daniel Dumile	Diplo; System D-128	3:33
3.	"Fall Back/Titty Fat"	Dumile; Glen Valencia, Jr.; Asaan Brooks	DiViNCi; Swamburger	3:34
4.	"Doom on Vik"	Dumile; Valencia, Jr.; Brooks; Israel Vasquetelle	DiViNCi; Swamburger	1:53
5.	"R.A.P. G.A.M.E." (featuring Manchild, Iz-Real & Doom (Note: Doom is listed as a feature on the vinyl label but not on the back of either the vinyl or CD versions of the album.))	W. Tolbert; Vasquetelle; Gregory Owens; Dumile	Session 31	4:20
6.	"Dope Skill" (featuring Carl Kavorkian)	Lavoy McConnell; Dumile; Carl Milbourne, Jr.	DJ I.N.C.	2:17
7.	"Doper Skiller" (featuring Kool Keith)	Keith Thornton; Dumile	DiViNCi	2:51
8.	"Haberdashery" (Interlude)			0:22
9.	"Ode to Road Rage"	Michael Delaney; Dumile	Dub-L	2:49
10.	"Bloody Chain" (featuring Poison Pen)	Delaney; Dumile; Lékan Herron	Dub-L	4:01
11.	"Strange New Day" (Interlude)		System D-128	0:32
12.	"Pop Quiz" (Bonus Extra Credit Remix) (performed by Iz-Real & Doom)	Vasquetelle; Dumile		3:57

== Personnel ==
Credits adapted from album's liner notes.

Personnel

- Viktor Vaughn – vocals (2, 3, 6, 7, 9, 10)
- Doom – vocals (5, 12)
- Manchild – vocals (5)
- Israel "Iz-Real" Vasquetelle – vocals (5, 12), vocal arrangement (4), executive producer, A&R
- Carl Kavorkian – vocals (6)
- Kool Keith – vocals (7)
- Poison Pen – vocals (10)
- System D-128 – production (1, 2, 11), scratches (10)
- Diplo – production (2)
- DiViNCi – production (3, 4, 7), additional digital enhancements & soundbites (1), vocal arrangement (4), mixing
- Swamburger – production (3, 4)
- Session 31 – production (5)
- DJ I.N.C. – production (6)
- Dub-L – production (8, 9)
- DJ Sure Shot – scratches (5, 7)
- DJ Escher – scratches (6)
- Kut Masta Kurt – scratches (12)
- The Analears – remixing (12)
- Thomas D. Jenkins – co-executive producer

Artwork

- Sanford Greene – artwork
- Gez Fry – additional coloring
