= American Hunger =

Studio album by MF Grimm
- Released: July 25, 2006
- Recorded: 2004–2006
- Genre: East Coast hip hop; alternative hip hop
- Length: 69:53 (Disc 1); 66:48 (Disc 2); 72:31 (Disc 3); 209:12 (Total)
- Label: Day By Day Entertainment
- Producer: Craig Rip; Krohme; Dub-L; The Architect; Hans Solo; DJ Crucial; J. Marty; Reality; Nate Denver; Sid V.; Black Panther; JL; Mixture; Soce; DNAE; Lyrical Graffiti; CX KiDTRONiK

MF Grimm chronology
Scars & Memories (2005)	American Hunger (2006)	The Hunt for the Gingerbread Man (2007)

Singles from American Hunger
- 1. "Gingerbread Man" Released: January 20, 2005; 2. "Vultures" Released: December 10, 2007

American Hunger is a triple album released on CD. It was released in 2006 by Manhattan, New York rap artist MF Grimm. It is also the first triple album in hip-hop history. It was originally planned for release on July 4, 2004, however multiple delays occurred including MF Grimm's hard drive losing data.

MF Grimm has stated that the album is not intended to be listened to in one sitting, rather it is intended to be taken in over the course of three separate listening sessions, reflecting the names of each disc: "Breakfast," "Lunch" and "Dinner."

== Reception ==
Professional ratings
Review scores
Source	Rating
AllHipHop	3.5/5 stars
AllMusic	4/5 stars
Spin	3/5 stars
Stylus	A

American Hunger has received very positive reviews from music critics and fans. AllMusic's Marisa Brown gave the album four stars out of five and called the album "a hard-hitting, provocative record that contains none of the skits or other filler commonly associated with hip-hop". She continued by concluding that the album is "one of the most thought-provoking and intelligent records – in any genre – of the new century". A.J. Henriques of Stylus Magazine gave the album an "A" score and said:

The word "filler" is subjective, but it's astoundingly difficult to apply it to any of the tracks on American Hunger. If pressed, Grimm probably could've made this a double album—but it'd be impossible to say what he'd shelve. Or why. Yeah: some tracks stand out and some are more sonically pleasing than others, but nothing feels out of place thematically and, despite the musical diversity, every part adds up to form a remarkable, cohesive work of art.

Fan reception over the years has been positive, and American Hunger has remained one of MF Grimm's most popular and enduring albums.

== Track listing ==
- Credits adapted from American Hunger liner notes.
- All tracks written by MF Grimm unless otherwise noted.

Disc One: Breakfast
No.	Title	Writer(s)	Producer(s)	Length
1.	"American Hunger (Breakfast)"		Craig Rip	3:04
2.	"When Faith is Lost"		Krohme	2:58
3.	"Page Six"		Krohme	3:48
4.	"The Life I Lead"		Dub-L	4:20
5.	"Wonderland"		The Architect	2:13
6.	"Code Noir (Revenge of the Masked Avengers)"		Hans Solo of the Masked Avengers	2:25
7.	"Right There"		J. Marty	3:51
8.	"I Rather Be Wrong"		DJ Crucial	5:27
9.	"Watch Out!"		J. Marty	3:07
10.	"Yes or No"		Craig Rip	3:27
11.	"The Trees" (featuring Baron)	MF Grimm; Baron	Sid V.	3:24
12.	"The Path" (featuring Monsta Island Czars)	MF Grimm; MeccaGodZilla a.k.a. RAVAGE; Destroyah a.k.a. MF Mez; GAMMA-RA a.k.a. Majesty	Lyrical Graffiti	4:17
13.	"Still My Love"		The Architect	3:40
14.	"Steal It"		J. Marty	3:40
15.	"My Mentality"		Reality	2:30
16.	"A Mother's Heart"		Rashad	2:49
17.	"Street General"		J. Marty	4:23
18.	"M.I.C." (featuring Monsta Island Czars)	MF Grimm; Gabarah a.k.a. Junclassic; Monsta X a.k.a. NTROSPEKT; MeccaGodZilla a.k.a. RAVAGE; GAMMA-RA a.k.a. Majesty; Destroyah a.k.a. MF Mez	The Architect	3:05
19.	"The Gingerbread Man"		DJ Crucial	3:29
20.	"I Don't Know"		DJ Crucial	4:06
Total length:				69:53

Disc Two: Lunch
No.	Title	Writer(s)	Producer(s)	Length
21.	"American Hunger (Lunch)"		Black Panther	2:11
22.	"Playground"		J. Marty	4:13
23.	"Boing" (featuring PMD and MF Mez)	MF Grimm; PMD; MF Mez	Mixture	2:52
24.	"It's No Secret"		JL	4:20
25.	"I Remember"		Gary (Chace) London	1:26
26.	"United" (featuring Large Professor)	MF Grimm; Large Professor	DJ Crucial	2:56
27.	"I Love You"		J. Marty	3:31
28.	"Traveling" (featuring Kurious, Lord Smog and Bashton the Invizabul Mang)	MF Grimm; Kurious; Lord Smog; Bashton the Invizabul Mang	DJ Crucial	3:47
29.	"Delilah"		J. Marty	2:21
30.	"Vultures"		DJ Crucial	3:35
31.	"Everyone"		Willow(treez)	2:44
32.	"Agony (No Jugamos)" (featuring Nate Denver)	MF Grimm; Nate Denver	Nate Denver	2:58
33.	"Master Builders"		The Architect	3:33
34.	"Things I've Said" (featuring Baron)	MF Grimm; Baron	The Architect	3:01
35.	"Broken Glasses"		The Architect	2:46
36.	"Dark Skies (No Jugamos)" (featuring Nate Denver and Bashton the Invizabul Mang)	MF Grimm; Nate Denver; Bashton the Invizabul Mang	Nate Denver	3:39
37.	"Teacher"		JL	2:44
38.	"Crazy" (featuring Block McCloud and MF Mez)	MF Grimm; Block McCloud; MF Mez	Mixture	4:13
39.	"Who Rock" (featuring Duece Gangsta)		CX KiDTRONiK	3:44
40.	"Fuck You"	MF Grimm; Bashton the Invizabul Mang	Reality	3:15
Total length:				66:48

Disc Three: The Last Supper
No.	Title	Writer(s)	Producer(s)	Length
41.	"American Hunger (The Last Supper)"		DJ Crucial	1:29
42.	"Children of Abel"		Mixture	3:32
43.	"Give"		The Last Skeptik	2:56
44.	"Adam & Eve"		DJ Crucial	3:12
45.	"Lift Me Up (Snakes & Ladders)"		Stalker	5:28
46.	"Heaven Can Wait"		Will Tell	2:18
47.	"Children of Cain"		Lyrical Graffiti	3:20
48.	"Revolution"		Captin Planit	2:04
49.	"Manhattan Murder" (featuring MF Mez)	MF Grimm; MF Mez	DJ Crucial	3:07
50.	"Karma" (featuring Ill Bill and Block McCloud)	MF Grimm; Ill Bill; Block McCloud	Krohme	4:08
51.	"G.O.D. (Government of Deception)"		MAS	3:36
52.	"Brand New" (featuring Monsta Island Czars)	MF Grimm; Destroyah a.k.a. MF Mez; GAMMA-RA a.k.a. Majesty; MeccaGodZilla a.k.a. RAVAGE	Nicotine	4:25
53.	"No One"		J. Marty	2:59
54.	"Elevate" (featuring Majesty and Infinit Evol)	MF Grimm; Majesty; Infinit Evol	Skammadix	4:37
55.	"Everything" (featuring Block McCloud, Majesty, Mr. Met and Baron)	MF Grimm; Majesty; Block McCloud; Mr. Met; Baron	Aksim	4:04
56.	"The Whole World" (featuring Infinit Evol)	MF Grimm; Infinit Evol	Soce, the elemental wizard	2:49
57.	"Ten Stories"		MAS; Quote7	4:13
58.	"Twin Peaks" (featuring MF Mez and Hasan Salaam)	MF Grimm; MF Mez; Hasan Salaam	DNAE	4:35
59.	"Simple Rhyme"		Lyrical Graffiti	3:26
60.	"The Book of Daniel" (featuring MF Mez and Bashton the Invizabul Mang)	MF Grimm; MF Mez; Bashton the Invizabul Mang	DJ Crucial	7:06
Total length:				72:31
