= Digital Tears: E-mail from Purgatory =

Studio album by GM Grimm as Superstar Jet Jaguar
- Released: March 1, 2004
- Recorded: 2003–2004
- Genre: Hip-hop
- Length: 76:12
- Label: Day By Day Entertainment
- Producer: J-Zone; MAS; Looie II; Zero Point; X-Ray; DJ Soundmachine

GM Grimm as Superstar Jet Jaguar chronology
The Downfall of Ibliys: A Ghetto Opera (2002)	Digital Tears: E-mail from Purgatory (2004)	Special Herbs + Spices Volume 1 (2004)

Singles from Digital Tears: E-mail from Purgatory
- 1. "Taken" Released: December 5, 2003

Professional ratings
Review scores
Source	Rating
XLR8R	(favorable)

Digital Tears: E-mail from Purgatory is a 2004 album by underground rapper MF Grimm. The LP is Grimm's second solo album and the first to be credited to both GM Grimm and the Monsta Island Czars moniker Jet Jaguar. Grimm recorded the entire album over a two-day period, and wrote the album and composed the drum beats on a portable drum machine while serving his life sentence in prison. This album is the darkest in Grimm's catalog and reflects the environment surrounding him during the composition. It was the first release after Grimm's release from prison.

Most of the production work was handled by Looie II and Zero Point, with two tracks produced by J-Zone. Although the album includes samples from the film Godzilla vs. Megalon and one production from X-Ray, there are no other references to the Monsta Island Czars (other than Grimm's references to himself as "Jet Jaguar"). The album also includes three spoken-word interludes performed by Monte Smith and produced by DJ Soundmachine.

Like The Downfall of Ibliys: A Ghetto Opera, Digital Tears: E-mail from Purgatory was reissued in 2010 after being out of print for many years.

== Singles ==
"Taken" b/w "Dancin'" (both produced by J-Zone) was released as a 12" vinyl single December 2003 in promotion of the album.

== Track listing ==
No.	Title	Producer(s)	Length
1.	"Intro"		0:29
2.	"All Y'All"	Looie II	3:55
3.	"Stable"	Zero Point	5:17
4.	"Dr. Death"	Looie II	4:18
5.	"The Deal is Done" (performed by Monte Smith)	DJ Soundmachine	2:00
6.	"Go Back"	Zero Point	3:24
7.	"Dancin'"	J-Zone	2:38
8.	"Enemy at Home" (performed by Monte Smith)	DJ Soundmachine	2:26
9.	"Black Helicopter" (featuring Jihad)	Zero Point	5:59
10.	"Straight Babylon No Chaser" (performed by Monte Smith)	DJ Soundmachine	2:29
11.	"Digital Tears"	Zero Point	5:15
12.	"Ying and Yang" (featuring Agu aka Mr. Voodoo and Su-Ann Ortiz)	MAS	4:54
13.	"The Way"	X-Ray	3:14
14.	"Taken"	J-Zone	2:42
15.	"Love Jones" (featuring Jihad)	Looie II	4:53
16.	"Rotten"	Looie II	4:47
17.	"Voices (The Final Chapter)"	MAS	5:24
18.	"Happy"	Zero Point	2:21
19.	"Superstar J.J." (featuring Su-Ann Ortiz)	Looie II	5:22
20.	"Static"	Zero Point	3:55
21.	"Outro"		0:39
Total length:			76:12
