= Escape from Monsta Island! =

Album by Monsta Island Czars

Studio album by Monsta Island Czars
- Released: 18 February 2003
- Recorded: 2002–03
- Genre: Hip-hop
- Length: 58:37
- Label: Metal Face; Rhymesayers
- Producer: King Geedorah; X-Ray

Escape from Monsta Island! is a studio album released by the Monsta Island Czars, a collective notably featuring MF Doom under his King Geedorah alias. Although the Monsta Island Czars were founded by MF Grimm, he is absent from the entire album due to his incarceration at the time of its production and release.

== Track listing ==
No.	Title	Producer(s)	Length
1.	"What's the Name of This Place?"	X-Ray	1:03
2.	"M.I.N.Y.A" (performed by Kamackeris, Rodan, Kong and Megalon)	X-Ray	4:13
3.	"F@#K Y'all N!@@#'s" (performed by Kamackeris and Megalon)	X-Ray	2:29
4.	"WitchCraft" (performed by Rodan, Megalon, Kong, Kamackeris, Spiega and King Caesar)	X-Ray	4:28
5.	"1,2... 1,2" (performed by Kong, Megalon and Rodan)	King Geedorah	3:29
6.	"Scientific Civilization" (skit)	King Geedorah/SpaceGodZilla	0:58
7.	"MIC Line" (performed by King Geedorah)	King Geedorah	3:13
8.	"Poizon Windz" (performed by Megalon, Rodan and Gigan)	X-Ray	3:56
9.	"Under Pressure" (performed by Spiega, Megalon, Rodan and Kong)	X-Ray	3:57
10.	"Became A Monsta" (performed by Spiega)	X-Ray	3:31
11.	"There's A Legend" (skit)	X-Ray	0:39
12.	"Out My Mind" (performed by King Caesar, Kamackeris and Megalon)	X-Ray	3:05
13.	"Warning" (performed by Kong)	X-Ray	2:59
14.	"Make It Squash" (performed by Kong, Megalon, King Caesar and Rodan)	King Geedorah	3:39
15.	"Gunz 'n' Swordz" (performed by Gigan & Megalon)	X-Ray	2:08
16.	"Sumthin' to Prove" (performed by Rodan)	X-Ray	4:31
17.	"Live Son Of A Bitch" (skit)	X-Ray	0:37
18.	"Comin' at You" (performed by Megalon, Rodan, Kamackeris and Kong)	King Geedorah	4:00
19.	"Take Control" (performed by Kamackeris)	X-Ray	2:16
20.	"Escape From Monsta Isle" (performed by Rodan, Megalon, Kong and Spiega)	King Geedorah	3:26
Total length:			58:37
