= Count Bass D =

American rapper (born 1973)

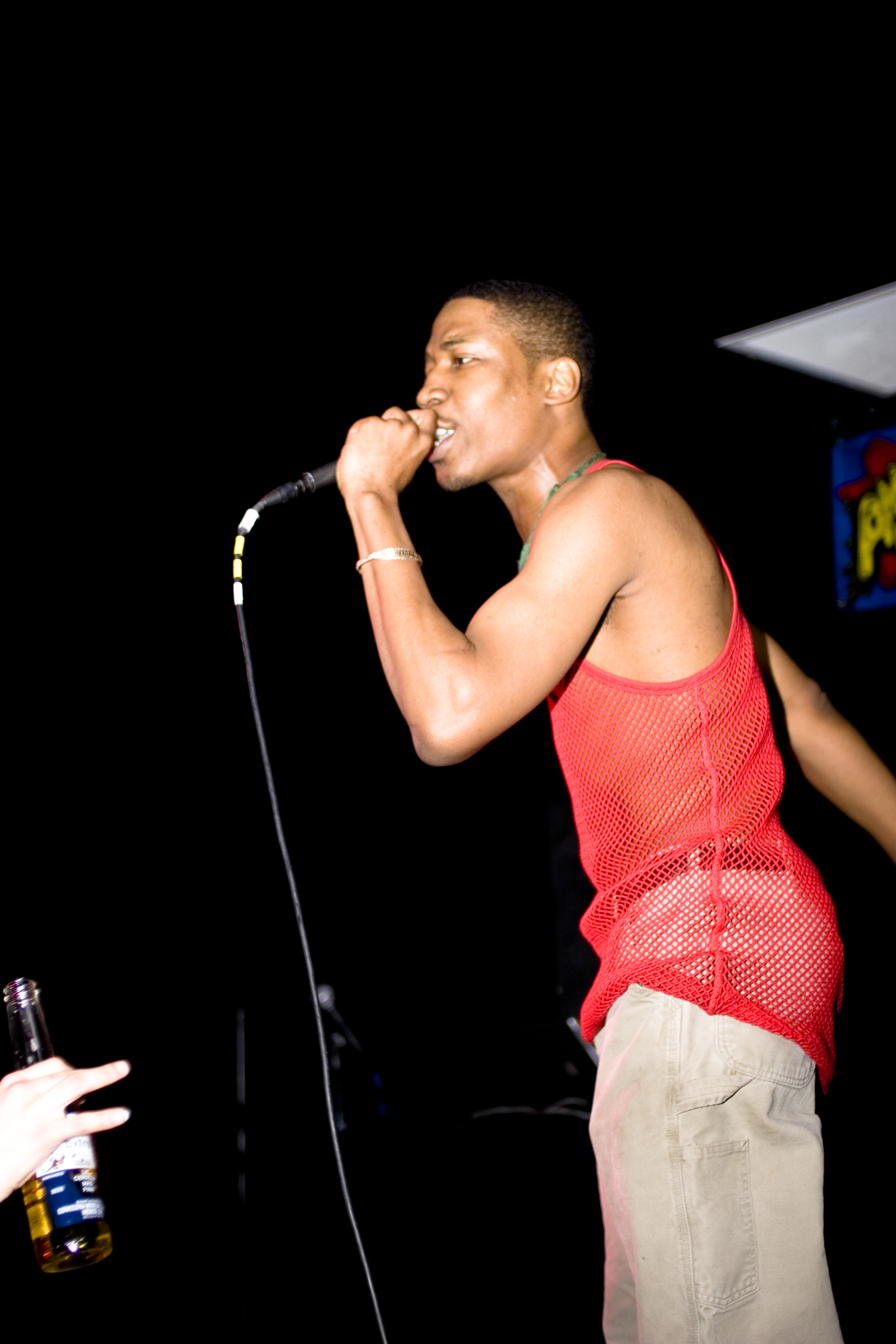
- Count Bass D performing in San Francisco in 2007

Background information
- Born: Dwight Conroy Farrell; August 25, 1973 (age 52)
- Origin: The Bronx, New York
- Genres: Hip hop
- Occupations: Rapper, record producer, multi-instrumentalist
- Years active: 1993–present
- Labels: Fat Beats, High Times Records, Chaos Recordings
- Website: countbassd.bandcamp.com

Dwight Conroy Farrell (born August 25, 1973), better known by his stage name Count Bass D, is an American rapper, record producer and multi-instrumentalist who resides in Millheim, Pennsylvania. His production style is characterised by layers of short MPC samples and film snippets complemented with live instrumentation, and eccentric lyrics laid atop.

== Early life and education ==
Farrell was born on August 25, 1973, and was raised in The Bronx and Canton, Ohio. At the age of four, his father, a West Indian minister, encouraged him to play music at his church. Farrell thereafter learned to play the piano, organ, drums, and bass. He then started gaining interest in hip-hop, becoming better at rhyming while rapping with friends.

In his late teens, Farrell enrolled at Middle Tennessee State University in Murfreesboro, taking advantage of equipment and facilities in the School of Music to finish his demo tape. He broadcast his first hip-hop video while on campus.

== Career ==
Farrell's demo led to a record deal with Chaos Recordings, where he released his first studio album, Pre-Life Crisis, on September 26, 1995. The label found the album difficult to market, and he was dropped from their roster.

In 1997, Farrell released his first EP, Art for Sale, on independent label Spongebath Records. The album was later released in Japan in 2005, on Octave Records.

In 2002, Farrell decided to make a more hip-hop themed album. He bought an Akai S-3000 sampler and an MPC-2000 drum machine and quickly learned to create new sounds. With these tools, he released his second and most critically-acclaimed studio album, Dwight Spitz. It features appearances from other well-known indie MCs, such as MF Doom and Edan. In 2004, Farrell produced and guest appeared on a track ("Potholderz") on MF Doom's MM..Food.

In 2005, Farrell released his second EP, Begborrowsteel, on Jazzy Sport Records. Act Your Waist Size, his third studio album, was released on Fat Beats Records in 2006. In 2008, Farrell released L7 (Mid-Life Crisis), a sequel album to Pre-Life Crisis, on 1320 Records. He was 35 at the time of its release.

In 2010, Farrell teamed up with his old friend, producer and rapper DJ Pocket, to make two collaborative albums that year – In the Loop and Activity – both released on Domination Records. In 2011, Farrell and Insight the Truncator released a collaborative record, The Risktakers. On August 25, 2011, Farrell self-released his fifth studio album, #FULLCOUNT, on his personal website. However, it appears that Spotify has since purchased the domain name.

== Discography ==
=== Studio albums ===
- Pre-Life Crisis (1995)
- Art for Sale (1997)
- Dwight Spitz (2002)
- Begborrowsteel (2005)
- Act Your Waist Size (2006)
- L7: Mid-Life Crisis (2008)
- In the Loop (2009) (with DJ Pocket)
- Activity (2010) (with DJ Pocket)
- Hartsfield Jaxson (2010) (with DJ Pocket)
- Fullcount (2011)
- Mic & Ike (2011)
- In the Loop: Partie Deux (2011) (with DJ Pocket)
- The Risk Takers (2011) (with Insight)
- In the Loop 3: ThanksFam (2012) (with DJ Pocket)
- Instantly New (2016)
- CBD (2020)
- All Due Respect (2022)
- Walter Dwight (2023)
- Player Programmer (2025)

=== Compilation albums ===
- The Producers Cut: Some Music Part 1 (2004)
- 2006: Some Music Part 2 (2004)
- Ear Regardless: Some Music Part 3 (2007)
- Some Music Part 4: Vinyl Ain't Dead Yet (2007)
- Some Music Part 5: Slim & Nice (2008)
- Robbed without a Pistol (2008)
- Dwight Yoke Them: Some Music Part 7 (2011)
- Cana (1 of 5) (2012)
- Hezekiah II (2 of 5) (2012)
- Kush (3 of 5) (2012)
- Magnificent (4 of 5) (2012)
- Gibraltar (5 of 5) (2012)
- The T.S. (2012)
- Some Music 6 (The Lost Installment) (2013)
- Promises (2013)
- Grandmaz Nutz (2013)
- Sorrow (2013)
- That Old Real Shit Suite (2013)
- Handshake vs. Dap (2014)
- Cloak and Dapper (2015)
- Dwight Around Your Lips (2016)

=== EPs ===
- Merely the Playas EP (2007) (with J. Rawls)
- Art for Art's Sake (2007) (with Blake 9)
- In This Business (2013) (with DJ Crucial)
- The Count in Cologne (2014) (with Retrogott, Twit One, and Lazy Jones)

=== Singles ===
- "Sandwiches (I Got a Feeling)" (1995)
- "Violatin'" / "The World Is Mine" (1999)
- "On the Reels" / "Piece of the Pie" / "Violatin'" (Remix) (1999)
- "7 Years" (2004)
- "Down Easy" (2005)
- "Internationally Known" (2006)
- "Caddy" (2025)
- "Mastermind"(2025)
- "Be Real" (2025)
- "Sometimes I Forget" (2025)

=== Guest appearances ===
- Knowdaverbs - "Strange Dames" from The Syllabus (1999)
- Vitamin C - "Girls Against Boys" from Vitamin C (1999)
- 7L & Esoteric - "Dwight Spits Intro" from The Soul Purpose (2001)
- 7L & Esoteric - "Rules of Engagement" from Dangerous Connection (2002)
- MF Grimm - "Alpha" from The Downfall of Ibliys: A Ghetto Opera (2002)
- MF Doom - "Potholderz" from MM..Food (2004)
- Wired All Wrong - "You're Freakin' Me Out Girl" from Break out the Battle Tapes (2006)
- Shape of Broad Minds - "It Live On" from Craft of the Lost Art (2007)
- Elemental & Tom Caruana - "Pay Me A Visit" from Rebel Without Applause (2008)
- Shafiq Husayn - "Major Heavy" from Shafiq En' A-Free-Ka (2009)
- J. Rawls - "We're on Top" from The Hip-Hop Affect (2011)
- Blueprint - "Once Again" from Respect the Architect (2014)
- Dillon & Paten Locke - "How to Count Bars" from Food Chain (2016)

=== Productions ===
- Beastie Boys - "Hey Ladies" (Count Bass D Remix) from Beastie Boys Video Anthology (2000)
- MF Grimm - "Alpha", "Words", and "Omega" from The Downfall of Ibliys: A Ghetto Opera (2002)
- MF Doom - "Potholderz" from MM..Food (2004)
- Piano Overlord - "Agorophobia" (Count Bass D Interpretation) from The Singles Collection 03-05 (2005)
- Dr. Who Dat? - "Kelly Drive" from Beat Journey (2006)
- Braille - "Sonset" from Box of Rhymes (2006)
