= Dwight Spitz =

Studio album by Count Bass D
- Released: April 30, 2002
- Recorded: 2002
- Genre: Alternative hip hop
- Length: 55:40
- Label: Day by Day
- Producer: Count Bass D, DJ Pocket, J. Rawls

Count Bass D chronology
Art For Sale (1997)	Dwight Spitz (2002)	Begborrowsteel (2005)

Dwight Spitz is the third album by the American hip hop artist and multi-instrumentalist Count Bass D, released in 2002.

== Overview ==
After the release of Pre-Life Crisis, Count Bass D felt he had overshot his own talent. In 2002, he decided to make a more hip hop-themed album, so he bought an Akai S-3000 sampler and an MPC-2000 drum machine and quickly learned to create beats using samples. Dwight Spitz is his first album with a more traditional hip hop theme. The album has collaborations with Edan, J. Rawls, Dione Farris and MF Doom.

A deluxe edition was released on Count Bass D's Bandcamp on August 25, 2013, to celebrate the album's ten year anniversary. The edition included six new bonus tracks.

== Critical reception ==
Professional ratings
Review scores
Source	Rating
RapReviews	8/10

The A.V. Club called the album "lovingly assembled and wonderfully idiosyncratic." Rolling Stone deemed it a "little headphone masterpiece." The East Bay Express wrote: "Whimsical, original, and extremely funky, the Count's third album is his best yet, overflowing with ear-tickling production and charismatic rhymes."

== Track listing ==
No.	Title	Producer(s)	Length
1.	"Jussa Playa"	Count Bass D	1:28
2.	"Aural S(ECT)s"	Count Bass D	1:30
3.	"Gon' Get Yours"	Count Bass D	0:33
4.	"Antemeridian"	Count Bass D	1:37
5.	"Postmeridian"	Count Bass D	0:56
6.	"How We Met" (feat. Edan)	Count Bass D	1:18
7.	"Just Say No to Drugs"	Count Bass D	0:31
8.	"Sanctuary"	Count Bass D	1:43
9.	"Subwoofer (Dumile)"	Count Bass D	2:11
10.	"Truth to Light"	Count Bass D	1:30
11.	"Real Music Vs. Bu11$#!+"	Count Bass D	1:29
12.	"August 25, 2001"	Count Bass D	3:29
13.	"Hello Test Test" (feat. Cana and Hezekiah)	Count Bass D	0:51
14.	"Blackman Dreams" (feat. Lil D)	Count Bass D	2:03
15.	"Reign or Shine" (feat. Rayna Shine)	Count Bass D	1:28
16.	"Quite Buttery" (feat. MF Doom)	Count Bass D	1:06
17.	"Blues for Percy Carey"	Count Bass D	1:52
18.	"Seven Years" (feat. Dionne Farris)	Count Bass D	3:29
19.	"Ohio Playas"	J. Rawls	2:07
20.	"Dwight Spitz"	Count Bass D	3:20
21.	"Make a Buck" (feat. MF Doom)	DJ Pocket	3:44
22.	"My First Piece" (feat. Oriana Lee and Hezekiah)	Count Bass D	3:04
23.	"Take Control"	Count Bass D	3:44
24.	"Coming Soon"	Count Bass D	0:17
25.	"Beat 4our" (Contains hidden track)	Count Bass D	26:35

10th Anniversary Deluxe Edition bonus tracks
No.	Title	Producer(s)	Length
26.	"Snow First, Snow Second, Snow Third"	Count Bass D	4:14
27.	"Nine Years Part 1"	Count Bass D	2:02
28.	"Nine Years Part 2"	Count Bass D	1:16
29.	"Real Music vs. Bull$#!+ Part 2"	Count Bass D	2:03
30.	"Seven Years Bonus Beats"	Count Bass D	1:56
31.	"I'm a Man"	Count Bass D	0:44
