= Good Morning Vietnam 3: The Phoenix Program =

Studio album by MF Grimm & Drasar Monumental
- Released: November 25, 2014
- Genre: Hip hop
- Length: 43:52
- Label: Vendetta Vinyl
- Producer: Drasar Monumental

MF Grimm chronology
Good Morning Vietnam 2: The Golden Triangle (2013)	Good Morning Vietnam 3: The Phoenix Program (2014)	MF Love Songs (2015)

Drasar Monumental chronology
Good Morning Vietnam 2: The Golden Triangle (2013)	Good Morning Vietnam 3: The Phoenix Program (2014)	The Boxcutter Brothers (2015)

Good Morning Vietnam 3: The Phoenix Program is a 2014 collaborative album by MF Grimm and Drasar Monumental. It is their third and final official project in the series and serves as a sequel to 2012's Good Morning Vietnam and 2013's Good Morning Vietnam 2: The Golden Triangle.

== Track listing ==
- All tracks produced by Drasar Monumental

No.	Title	Length
1.	"Birth of Violence"	3:41
2.	"Rhymes Against Humanity"	1:38
3.	"Song of the Winter Soldier"	3:18
4.	"Economics"	4:27
5.	"One Bullet Away, Two Steps from Home"	2:47
6.	"Apocalypse Now"	2:07
7.	"Dust to Dust"	2:39
8.	"Moral Compass (First of the North Star)"	3:08
9.	"A Gentleman Never Kissinger and Tell"	5:14
10.	"Glaciers of ICEX"	3:08
11.	"Family Jewels"	0:44
12.	"Patsy (Best of the Worst, First of the Last)"	0:56
13.	"For Those That Want to Label Us"	1:54
14.	"Hands Up to Heaven, Feet Firm in Hell"	3:42
15.	"Harmonics"	2:06
16.	"Chain Letter"	2:31
Total length:		43:52
