= Scars & Memories =

Studio album by MF Grimm
- Released: July 19, 2005
- Recorded: 1993–2004
- Genre: Hip hop
- Length: 66:06
- Label: Day By Day Entertainment
- Producers: Metal Fingers; Ninja B. Dr. Butcher; Sean C. Knobody; Rob Swift; Gonzo; Mas Tycoon

MF Grimm chronology
Special Herbs + Spices Volume 1 (2004)	Scars & Memories (2005)	American Hunger (2006)

Professional ratings
Review scores
Source	Rating
Unkut	Very favourable link
Rap Reviews.com	7.5/10

Scars & Memories is an album by Manhattan, New York rapper MF Grimm, released on July 19, 2005, via his own Day by Day Entertainment label. While most of the tracks were written during the early 1990s, the original song reels were stolen, forcing Grimm to re-record many of the tracks. This album blends past hip hop styles with new techniques, and features exclusive interviews with Grimm that show not only how his evolution as an artist, but also the changes in his perspective of life.

Scars & Memories contains a number of Grimm's singles from the Dolo and Fondle 'Em labels, as well as unreleased material. In addition to the songs, the album contains seven short interview clips featuring Grimm answering questions about his life. Due to the varying source material, some of the tracks are of far lower sound quality than others.

== Songs ==
Some songs here are presented with different names than their original releases, and some were re-recorded when the reels were either lost or stolen. "Take 'Em to War (Original Version)" was originally released as "WWIII," and "AIDS" was originally released as "Stay Strapped." The song "Do It for the Kids" appears here in a different form than the one originally released on Fondle 'Em, but that was due to a clerical error with the label releasing the wrong version of the song in 1996.

The songs "Scars & Memories," "Emotions," and "Get Down" were re-recorded since the original reels were lost. There are audible differences between the originals and the versions that appear on the album.

== Track listing ==
No.	Title	Producer(s)	Length
1.	"Grandmaster Interview"		0:53
2.	"Take Em to War (Original Version)"	Metal Fingers	3:31
3.	"Manhattan Interview"		0:46
4.	"King of New York"	Ninja B	3:43
5.	"Get Down" (featuring DJ Ekim)	Dr. Butcher	3:24
6.	"Hip Hop Interview"		0:53
7.	"So Whatcha Want Nigga?"	Knobody; Sean C.	4:33
8.	"Getting Shot Interview"		1:52
9.	"Bloody Love Letter"	Rob Swift	4:18
10.	"Comrade Interview"		0:39
11.	"Scars & Memories"	Rob Swift	6:18
12.	"Percy Carey Interview"		0:34
13.	"Crumb Snatchers"	Gonzo	5:42
14.	"In the End" (featuring Yves St. Larock)	MAS	4:24
15.	"AIDS" (featuring Kool G Rap, Akinyele, CJ Moore and Big Chuck)	Dr. Butcher	3:24
16.	"MF Grimm Interview"		1:12
17.	"The Original"	Ninja B	3:58
18.	"Wack Emcees" (featuring Nomad, Yves St. Larock and Wayne-O)	MAS	3:40
19.	"Do It for the Kids"	Rob Swift	4:26
20.	"Emotions" (featuring B-One)	Dr. Butcher	4:24
21.	"Dedicated" (featuring Squeeze)	Rob Swift	4:04
Total length:			66:06

== Miscellanea ==
- The title track, "Scars & Memories", was written by MF Grimm immediately after he came out of his coma.
- The original reels for this album were stolen.
- The album art pictures MF Grimm standing up, despite the fact that has been using a wheelchair since 1994.
