= Mudville (band) =

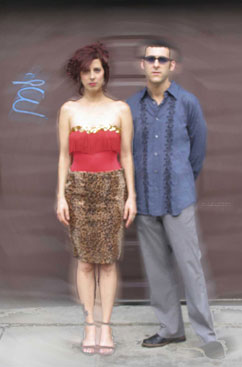
- Marilyn Carino and Benny Cha Cha of Mudville

Background information
- Origin: Brooklyn, New York, USA
- Genres: Electronica; Downtempo; Post-Trip hop
- Years active: 2002 - present
- Members: Marilyn Carino; Benny "Cha Cha" Rubin; Brian Charette; John Walter Bollinger
- Website: http://www.mudvillemusic.com/

Mudville is a Brooklyn, NY-based band and artist collective whose sound, a hybrid of downtempo, electronica, Memphis-style soul and jazz was dubbed, "post-trip hop" by John Donohue of The New Yorker. Core members Marilyn Carino and Ben (Benny Cha Cha) Rubin have distinguished themselves as adding sophistication to the genre with classic Hip hop stylings, elements of improvisational free jazz and attention to songcraft more influenced by Marvin Gaye and Duke Ellington than the minimalist, pop-based structure and lyrics by which the genre is most often characterized. The New York Post has lauded Mudville's "poetic lyrics, filled with imagery" and "otherworldly, blues-jazz feel" and Time Out New York characterized the band's live sound as "brainy, extended improvs... a potent fusion of jazz and space-rock.

== History ==
The brainchild of bassist/producer Rubin and vocalist/songwriter Carino, Mudville began in San Francisco as a more straightforward rock band that prominently featured Hammond B3 organ. One independently-released CD was recorded in 1997 under Marilyn Carino's name, titled Long Island Lulu.

Upon relocating to New York in 2000, Carino and Rubin began collaborating on songs with Carino writing lyrics and melodies and Rubin producing tracks using a combination of painstakingly-arranged live instruments and digital sampling. Carino is known for her "serious chops", sultry, limber contralto voice and expressive phrasing which is often compared to Annie Lennox, Nina Simone and Sarah Vaughan, and for her poetic, progressive-minded prose, which has drawn comparisons to that of Radiohead and R.E.M. She has also co-written and sung on tracks produced by Sly and Robbie.

Benny Cha Cha has been a bassist for numerous Jazz and Rock greats, including Ronnie Cuber, Bill Frisell, Jim Campilongo, Moby and Marshall Crenshaw, and has distinguished himself as a remix artist who has worked with the Wu-Tang Clan's Killah Priest, Karsh Kale and Brazilian Girls.

The duo have recorded an EP, 2003's four-song Mudville, which featured one track, "High Rise", that was co-produced by Billy Talbot, bassist of Neil Young and Crazy Horse, and two full-length recordings; 2005's The Glory of Man is Not in Vogue, which was lauded as "Enchanting... a testament to the healing powers of rhythm" and "A captivating and emotionally charged album" and 2007's Iris Nova, which features an eclectic array of artists, including R.E.M. bassist Mike Mills on piano, Telecaster maestro Jim Campilongo on guitar, percussionist/producer Karsh Kale, Bob Dylan pedal-steel guitarist Buddy Cage, the Ethel string quartet and saxophonist and former Lounge Lizard Michael Blake. American Songwriter magazine called Iris Nova "a pageantry of maturing sounds and measures, confident attitudes and different genres" and Rhapsody deemed it "a perfect melding, as if Nina Simone came back from the dead to front Morcheeba on a new record".

In 2015, the band released a new track, "Someone Else," which served as the end credits music for director Nelson Kim's debut feature film Someone Else.

Mudville's live band since 2005 has consisted of John Walter Bollinger on drums and Brian Charette on keyboards and guitar.

Mudville is also known for collaborations with artists of many disciplines, doing experimental projects with up-and-coming New York videographers and clothing designers and also performing with a contortionist.

In 2008, they won Best Dance/Electronica Song at the Independent Music Awards with their song "Wicked".

== Discography ==
Ben Rubin and Marilyn Carino as "Marilyn Carino"

- Long Island Lulu - 1997

As Mudville"

- Mudville EP - 2001
1. Private Plane
2. Waterbird
3. Nothing Gets You Going
4. High Rise
- The Glory of Man is Not in Vogue - 2003, reissue 2005 by Day By Day Entertainment
1. The Hero of the World
2. Blown
3. Stoned
4. Perfect
5. Othello
6. Poets on parade
7. In Orbit
8. Pray
9. Surfer Girls
10. Sunshine Is On Me
- Side Trax (Remixes) (digital only) - 2006 1. Blown (AJ Nuttal remix) 2. Pray (MNO Bombay Tension remix) 3. Nothing Gets You Going (Live at Pianos) 4. Blown (AJ Nuttal remix) (instrumental) 5. Pray (MNO Bombay Tension remix) (instrumental)
- Iris Nova - 2007
1. Eternity
2. Wonder Boy
3. Wicked
4. Brooklyn
5. Spirits in the Material World
6. Joy
7. Duke
8. Sado
9. This Hollywood Life
10. Sparkle
11. Lotus
- "Someone Else" (from the feature film Someone Else) - 2015 (Ropeadope Records)

Marilyn Carino solo recordings

- Little Genius - 2011
- Leaves, Sadness, Science - 2015
