= You Only Live Twice: The Audio Graphic Novel =

Studio album by MF Grimm
- Released: June 8, 2010
- Genre: Hip hop
- Label: Day By Day Entertainment
- Producer: Twiz The Beat Pro

MF Grimm chronology
The Hunt for the Gingerbread Man (2007)	You Only Live Twice: The Audio Graphic Novel (2010)	Good Morning Vietnam (2012)

You Only Live Twice: The Audio Graphic Novel is a hip hop album by Manhattan, New York rapper MF Grimm released on June 8, 2010. It is entirely produced by Twiz the Beat Pro (who is also a member of the Day By Day Entertainment label). The artwork for this album was done by graphics artist Jim Mahfood who was also said to be doing a 13-page comic book based on the album, though as of 2021, nothing has materialized.

The album was originally going to be released on May 18, 2010, but instead a single from the album was released on that date.

== Story Mixtape ==
For a short period of time, MF Grimm gave away a short mixtape titled Story: Substance, Style, Structure and the Principles of Hip Hop on the Day By Day Entertainment website. The mixtape is no longer available after legal action was taken against producer Rob Swift over an uncleared sample.

== Reception ==
Professional ratings
Review scores
Source	Rating
Hip Hop Site	3.5/5
Above Ground Magazine	14.25/20

You Only Live Twice: the Audio Graphic Novel was very well received by fans and received generally positive reviews from critics.

== Track listing ==
- All tracks produced by Twiz the Beat Pro

No.	Title	Length
1.	"Blessings"	2:31
2.	"Return to Eden"	4:55
3.	"I Am King"	3:37
4.	"All I Need"	3:04
5.	"You Only Live Twice"	3:58
6.	"The Legend of the Golden Warrior"	6:09
7.	"Medicine"	3:34
8.	"Waiting"	2:39
9.	"Fight"	3:30
10.	"Angel Without Wings"	4:23
11.	"Marry Mary"	4:11
12.	"Last Days"	3:09
13.	"The Compound"	3:34
Total length:		49:11
