= The Hunt for the Gingerbread Man =

Studio album by MF Grimm
- Released: September 25, 2007
- Genre: Hip-hop
- Length: 45:01
- Label: Day by Day Entertainment; Class A Records
- Producer: Stricknine; Metabolis; Aksim; Prowla; Sammsonite

MF Grimm chronology
| American Hunger (2006) | The Hunt for the Gingerbread Man (2007) | You Only Live Twice: The Audio Graphic Novel (2010) |

Singles from The Hunt for the Gingerbread Man
- 1. "Earth" Released: September 13, 2007

Professional ratings
Review scores
| Source | Rating |
|---|---|
| AllHipHop | unfavorable |
| AllMusic | 3/5 stars |
| Pitchfork | 3.5/10 |
| PopMatters | 7/10 stars |
| XLR8R | 5/10 |

The Hunt for the Gingerbread Man is a 2007 studio album by American rapper MF Grimm.

== Reception ==
Jody Macgregor of AllMusic gave the album 3 stars out of 5, calling it "candy rap in the most literal sense of the phrase". Evan Sawdey of PopMatters gave the album 7 stars out of 10, describing it as "another amazingly strong album by a rapper that's deserving of a much wider audience".

Meanwhile, Ian Cohen of Pitchfork gave the album a 3.5 out of 10, stating that "the beats are so close to backpacker parody that Party Fun Action Committee can stay retired".

== Track listing ==
| No. | Title | Producer(s) | Length |
|---|---|---|---|
| 1. | "Intro" | Stricknine | 2:12 |
| 2. | "The Hunt for the Gingerbread Man" | Stricknine | 3:57 |
| 3. | "Head in the Clouds" | Metabolis | 4:08 |
| 4. | "Gingy" | Stricknine | 3:59 |
| 5. | "Half Baked" | Aksim | 3:38 |
| 6. | "The Fox" | Stricknine | 2:27 |
| 7. | "My House" | Stricknine | 4:18 |
| 8. | "Fame" | Stricknine | 3:35 |
| 9. | "Earth" | Stricknine | 4:23 |
| 10. | "Gangsta Pastries" (featuring Chico Stick) | Prowla | 3:13 |
| 11. | "See No Evil" | Stricknine | 3:07 |
| 12. | "Outro" | Stricknine | 1:48 |
| 13. | "Head in the Clouds (Bonus Remix)" | Sammsonite | 4:16 |
| Total length: | | | 45:01 |
