= MF Grimm =

American rapper, producer, CEO, and comic book writer

- Also known as: List: Grandmaster Grimm; GM Grimm; The Grimm Reaper; Superstar Jet Jaguar; Build and Destroy; Mad Flowz Grimm Reaper
- Born: Percy Carey; June 11, 1970 (age 56); Manhattan, New York City, U.S.
- Genres: Hip hop; underground hip hop
- Occupations: Rapper; producer; CEO; comic book writer; actor
- Years active: 1975–present
- Labels: Day By Day; Vendetta Vinyl; Fondle 'Em
- Website: magneticforce.com

Percy Carey (born June 11, 1970), also known by the stage names MF Grimm, Grimm Reaper, GM Grimm, and originally Build and Destroy, is an American underground rapper, music producer, CEO, and Eisner Award-nominated comic book writer from New York City. Grimm has released five solo albums, five collaborative albums and two compilation albums.

== Early life ==
Percy Carey grew up on the Upper West Side of Manhattan. His neighbor, Morgan Freeman, helped arrange for him to be cast as a child actor on Sesame Street, he first appeared in Season 7, Episode 0806. He appeared on the show from age 5 to around age 9. "One episode, I lost my tooth, and me and Big Bird had to go through Sesame Street and try to find it," Carey remembers. The idea for that episode came about after Carey told Jim Henson about a dream he'd had the night before.

During his teenage years Grimm became involved with the hip hop community and decided that he wanted to be an MC at the age of 14. His mother supported this dream and bought him turntables and a microphone. Carey was expelled from Park West High School in Hell's Kitchen after beating up a dean over owed drug money.

== Career ==
MF Grimm's career began in the late 1980s where he performed in New York City. He later went on tour with MC Lyte as well. Into the 1990s Grimm continued to perform at freestyle competitions and performed alongside rappers Lord Finesse, GZA and Large Professor, amongst others. MF Grimm's most recent releases include a three-part conceptual series of albums with producer Drasar Monumental titled Good Morning Vietnam.

=== 1990s ===
In the early nineties Carey moved to California, where he formed a DJ/rapper group called the Gravediggaz (not to be confused with the Gravediggaz) and through the mid-nineties worked together with Roc Raida as his DJ. In 1993, Grimm placed third at the World Supremacy Battle, already known as an experienced battle rapper. That year, he released his first 12" single, So Whatcha Want Nigga? (later released on the Scars & Memories album in 2005) and performed at the Jack The Rapper convention on Execution Night, sharing the stage with Lady of Rage, Tupac, and Tha Dogg Pound, in Atlanta. He also collaborated with hip-hop legends like Kool G Rap, Kurious and KMD, appearing on albums and singles by them.

In 1993, MF Grimm had recorded an album's worth of material that was to serve as his debut album. After being shot and hospitalized, a lot of the material was stolen or lost, as it wasn't expected that he would survive his coma. After he woke up from the coma Grimm was able to retrieve some of the lost records and some of this material went on to be released later as singles, and later formed the 2005 compilation album Scars & Memories.

In the mid-late 1990s, MF Grimm went on to release several 12" singles on Bobbito's Fondle 'Em label and started collaborating extensively with label mate MF Doom whose debut album Operation: Doomsday was recorded in Grimm's basement, and for which Grimm served as an executive producer (financing the project and supplying samples for the album). It was during this time that Grimm founded the Day By Day Entertainment label, as well as the hip hop collective Monsta Island Czars with MF Doom.

=== 2000s ===
MF Grimm's first release of the 2000s was the collaborative MF EP with MF Doom on Brick Records. The release included remixes, as well as new material and the instrumental versions to every track.

In 2001, MF Grimm recorded his debut album, The Downfall of Ibliys: A Ghetto Opera while on bail after his prison sentencing. The entire album was recorded during a twenty four-hour period, and featured production and appearances from Count Bass D and MF Doom. The album was released on Grimm's Day By Day Entertainment label, although he did not hear the album until after his release from prison in 2003. Around the time of MF Grimm's release, Day By Day Entertainment released a compilation of MF Grimm and MF Doom material titled Best of MF. This compilation included features both artists had done, as well as several then-unreleased tracks. Some of the tracks would later be re-released under different titles on various projects.

In addition to releasing his own material, Grimm has served as an Executive Producer on albums from the period, including Operation: Doomsday, KMD's Black Bastards and Escape from Monsta Island!, amongst others.

After his release from prison, Grimm completed his second album Digital Tears: E-mail from Purgatory in 2004 under his Monsta Island Czars moniker Superstar Jet Jaguar. The album's lyrics as well as drum beats were all created while in prison using a portable drum machine that Grimm managed to hide from the prison guards. Following that release he and MF Doom collaborated once more for his third album, Special Herbs + Spices Volume 1, also released in 2004. This album featured MF Grimm freestyling over MF Doom beats taken from his Special Herbs instrumental album series. Following this release, MF Grimm released a compilation of material recorded and released prior to The Downfall of Ibliys: a ghetto opera. Underground hit singles, as well as some harder-to-find material, were included and the compilation was released in 2005 as Scars & Memories

In 2006, MF Grimm released a 60-track, triple-CD album, American Hunger, the first ever in hip hop on his Day By Day Entertainment label. The album also featured members of Monsta Island Czars. Each of the three discs was intended as a separate "meal" -- "Breakfast," "Lunch" and "The Last Supper." Included on the album is the track "The Book of Daniel," a scathing diss track recorded in response to MF Doom's diss against Monsta Island Czars (referring to them as "midgets into crunk").

Grimm's life story was retold in a graphic novel autobiography illustrated by Ronald Wimberly, Sentences: The Life of MF Grimm, which was released by DC Comics' Vertigo imprint in September 2007. Two months later, MF Grimm appeared on National Public Radio to relate his life story and future plans. That year MF Grimm also released the concept album The Hunt for the Gingerbread Man, with a mixtape The Order of the Baker Mixtape released as a prequel.

In 2008, Grimm, under his real name Percy Carey, was nominated for two Eisner Awards for Sentences, Best Reality Based Work and Best Lettering. He was also nominated for, and won, two Glyph Awards for Best Cover and Story of the Year.

In 2009, Grimm released a short mixtape on the Day By Day Entertainment website entitled Story: Substance, Style, Structure and the Principles of Hip Hop as a promotional release preceding his work in the new decade.

=== 2010s ===
In 2010, Grimm released his seventh studio album You Only Live Twice: The Audio Graphic Novel which was accompanied by a 13-page comic book based on the album by Jim Mahfood.

In 2012, he collaborated with underground producer Drasar Monumental and the Vendetta Vinyl label to record a series of releases. The first release by the duo was a mixtape entitled Preemptive Strike followed by Good Morning Vietnam. The duo followed up their success by releasing a full-length sequel Good Morning Vietnam 2: The Golden Triangle in November 2013. This release further explored the Vietnam concept, and introduced heroin as a theme as well. The duo released the third and final iteration to the series, Good Morning Vietnam 3: The Phoenix Program November 25, 2014.

On February 4, 2015, MF Grimm announced the release of a compilation of his love songs for release on February 14, 2015, titled MF Love Songs. The release is slated to include material from across his entire career.

=== 2020s ===
On March 15, 2021, MF Grimm released The Hunt For The Gingerbread Man 2: Get The Dough produced by Darko the Super, premiering an animated music video for the track Candy Rain (Falling Down) directed by NutzenTV.

== Aliases ==
MF Grimm has used a number of aliases over the years. He was given the name "Build and Destroy" by King Sun as a teen, but switched to the name "The Grimm Reaper" by the end of the 1980s. "MF Grimm" came about from his time living in California, where he was often told that he had "mad flows." As part of Monsta Island Czars, Grimm has used the names Jet Jaguar and Superstar Jet Jaguar. After his release from prison, Grimm also used the GM Grimm moniker, short for Grandmaster Grimm. Since 2004, Grimm has continued to use the "MF Grimm" moniker, although he sometimes refers to himself as "GM Grimm" or "Jet Jaguar."

== Personal life ==
In 1994, Grimm survived an attempted murder where he was shot seven times by rival drug dealers, following a previous three shots in an earlier murder attempt in 1986. As a result of the 1994 attack, he was deafened, blinded, paralyzed from the waist down, and comatose; doctors predicted that he would have dulled senses and be paralyzed for the rest of his life. MF Grimm's half-brother and manager Jansen Smalls died in the attack. As a result of this attack, all the music labels interested in Grimm's music cut all contact with him. Grimm recovered full vision, hearing, and speech ability, but still uses a wheelchair.

Grimm founded label Day By Day Entertainment in the late-1990s. At around the same time, he put together his Godzilla-inspired MC collective, the Monsta Island Czars, which at the time also featured MF Doom. However, to pay for the extensive medical bills from his hospitalization, Grimm turned back to drug dealing. This lifestyle eventually caught up with him again when his organization was taken down by the police.

Facing narcotics conspiracy charges, Grimm was sentenced to life imprisonment under the Rockefeller Drug Laws in 2000. Before his sentence began, Grimm recorded his debut album, The Downfall of Ibliys: A Ghetto Opera. In 2003, his life sentence was reduced and he was eventually released.

=== Relationship with MF Doom ===
MF Grimm and MF Doom became friends in the early 1990s, bonding over Hip Hop, comics, and mutual friends. Grimm featured on KMD's 1993 single What a Niggy Know (Remix), credited as "The Grimm Reaper." After the death of Doom's brother DJ Subroc and Grimm's paralysis, the two bonded, living together and looking after one another. Although Grimm maintained a presence in Hip Hop, Doom did not reemerge until 1996. Grimm, in his capacity as executive producer, funded Operation: Doomsday as well as providing the samples which appeared on the album. Grimm also funded the release of KMD's second album Black Bastards, once again serving as an executive producer.

In 2000, Doom and Grimm released the collaborative MF EP, featuring both artists splitting the record's material, and including the instrumental versions. Upon Grimm's release from prison in 2003, Day By Day Entertainment released a compilation of MF Grimm and MF Doom material as Best of MF. In 2004, the duo released a collaborative album of Grimm rapping over Doom's Special Herbs beats called Special Herbs + Spices Volume 1.

== Discography ==
=== Solo albums ===
- 2002: The Downfall of Ibliys: A Ghetto Opera
- 2004: Digital Tears: E-Mail From Purgatory (as Superstar Jet Jaguar)
- 2005: Scars & Memories
- 2006: American Hunger
- 2007: The Hunt for the Gingerbread Man
- 2010: You Only Live Twice: The Audio Graphic Novel
- 2017: American Hunger: Rebirth
- 2019: American Hunger Rebirth, Vol. 2: Trials, Tribulations, Humiliation and Elevation
- 2021: The Hunt for the Gingerbread Man 2: Get the Dough

=== Compilation albums ===
- 2003: Best of MF (with MF Doom)
- 2015: MF Love Songs

=== Collaboration albums ===
- 2000: MF EP (with MF Doom)
- 2004: Special Herbs + Spices Volume 1 (with MF Doom)
- 2012: Good Morning Vietnam (with Drasar Monumental)
- 2013: Good Morning Vietnam 2: The Golden Triangle (with Drasar Monumental)
- 2014: Good Morning Vietnam 3: The Phoenix Program (with Drasar Monumental)
