= Pre-Life Crisis =

Studio album by Count Bass D
- Released: 1995
- Genre: Hip hop
- Length: 54:40
- Label: Work
- Producer: Count Bass D

Count Bass D chronology
Pre-Life Crisis (1995)	Art for Sale (1997)

Pre-Life Crisis is the debut album by the American rapper and musician Count Bass D, released in 1995. Count Bass D played the majority of the instruments on the album. The album's only single, "Sandwiches (I Got a Feeling)", received moderate radio and video airplay, in addition to being released on vinyl and CD, along with the B-side "T-Boz Tried to Talk to Me".

Nathan Rabin of The A.V. Club describes Pre-Life Crisis as "one of the strangest major-label rap albums of all time," but note that the rapper was dropped by Sony following its release.

== Critical reception ==
Professional ratings
Review scores
Source	Rating
AllMusic	2.5/5 stars
Spin	7/10

The International Herald Tribune noted that Count Bass D's "raps are hard-hitting but mellifluous, minimum-expletive and laugh-sprinkled." In 2003, Rolling Stone wrote that the "hyperquirky debut ... imagined an esoteric, fully live hip-hop wonder world that transcended the generic boombap."

Retrospectively, Nathan Rabin of The A.V. Club praised Pre-Life Crisis as "[one] of the most original debuts in rap history," writing that it "suggested the work of a loopy cocktail-jazz pianist who decided to replace his repertoire of Burt Bacharach favorites with goofy rap odes to T-Boz and Carmex." Andrew Martin PopMatters named it a "groundbreaking and original debut" on which "Count basically made it clear that hip-hop would not be pigeonholed as long as he’s around."

The album sold poorly, resulting in Count Bass D being dropped from his label, but gave the rapper a cult following.

== Track listing ==
#	Title	Length	Songwriter(s)	Producer(s)	Performer(s)
1	The Dozens	3:38	Dwight Conroy Farrell	Count Bass D	Count Bass D
2	Sandwiches (I Got a Feeling)	4:39	Dwight Conroy Farrell	Count Bass D	Count Bass D, (Mark Nash (musician) on Lead Guitar)
3	T-Boz (Part 1/2)	0:35	Dwight Conroy Farrell	Count Bass D	Count Bass D, (Rod McGahaw on Flugelhorn)
4	Shake	4:08	Dwight Conroy Farrell	Count Bass D	Count Bass D, (Mark Nash on Lead Guitar), (Rod McGahaw on Trumpet), (Kismick Martin on Additional Background Vocals & Freestyle on Vamp), (Vincent Sims on Additional Background Throat)
5	T-Boz Tried to Talk to Me!	4:42	Dwight Conroy Farrell	Count Bass D	Count Bass D, (Rod McGahaw on Flugelhorn)
6	Carmex	5:17	Dwight Conroy Farrell	Count Bass D	Count Bass D
7	I Got Needs	4:24	Dwight Conroy Farrell	Count Bass D	Count Bass D, (Mark Nash on Lead Guitar), (Roger "Rock" Williams on Soprano Saxophone)
8	Broke Thursday	4:02	Dwight Conroy Farrell	Count Bass D, Coolout (co-producer)	Count Bass D, Herbie Hancock, M. Ragin, P. Jackson
9	Agriculture	4:47	Dwight Conroy Farrell & Vincent Sims	Count Bass D	Count Bass D, Vincent Sims (Roger "Rock" Williams on Alto Flute)
10	Brown	4:01	Dwight Conroy Farrell	Count Bass D	Count Bass D, (DJ Reggie (Reg) Mason & Vincent Sims on Background Throat)
11	The Hate Game	4:43	Dwight Conroy Farrell	Count Bass D	Count Bass D (Psalm 109 on inspiration)
12	Pink Tornado	3:15	Dwight Conroy Farrell	Count Bass D	Count Bass D, Jaco Pastorius
13	Sunday School	5:35	Dwight Conroy Farrell	Count Bass D	Count Bass D (Psalm 118:24 on inspiration)
14	Baker's Dozen (Instrumental)	1:01	Dwight Conroy Farrell	Count Bass D	Count Bass D
