= Good Morning Vietnam 2: The Golden Triangle =

Studio album by MF Grimm & Drasar Monumental
- Released: November 7, 2013
- Genre: Hip hop
- Length: 38:18
- Label: Vendetta Vinyl
- Producer: Drasar Monumental

MF Grimm & Drasar Monumental chronology
Good Morning Vietnam (2012)	Good Morning Vietnam 2: The Golden Triangle (2013)	Good Morning Vietnam 3: The Phoenix Program (2014)

Good Morning Vietnam 2: The Golden Triangle is a 2013 collaborative album by MF Grimm & Drasar Monumental, their second official project together and the sequel to 2012's Good Morning Vietnam EP. Picking up where the previous title left off, this iteration introduces the theme of heroin and the drug trade. Reinforcing this are the American Gangster film samples that can be heard throughout the album.

== Reception ==
Like the first Good Morning Vietnam, Good Morning Vietnam 2: the Golden Triangle was met with positive critical and fan reactions and its initial run sold out very quickly.

Professional ratings
Review scores
Source	Rating
RapReviews.com	7.5/10

== Track listing ==
- All tracks produced by Drasar Monumental

No.	Title	Length
1.	"The Bear"	4:35
2.	"20%"	3:55
3.	"Khun-Sa"	0:59
4.	"Golden Triangle"	1:48
5.	"Caged Bird"	5:37
6.	"Check Em"	3:11
7.	"Economic Deprivation"	4:42
8.	"Percy Carey"	4:10
9.	"Saga"	1:48
10.	"What Went Wrong"	3:54
11.	"Burning Daylight"	3:44
Total length:		38:18
