= Good Morning Vietnam (EP) =

Good Morning Vietnam EP

EP by MF Grimm & Drasar Monumental
- Released: December 16, 2012
- Genre: Hip hop
- Length: 20:14
- Label: Vendetta Vinyl
- Producer: Drasar Monumental

MF Grimm chronology
You Only Live Twice: The Audio Graphic Novel (2010)	Good Morning Vietnam EP (2012)	Good Morning Vietnam 2: The Golden Triangle (2013)

Drasar Monumental chronology
Good Morning Vietnam EP (2012)	Good Morning Vietnam 2: The Golden Triangle (2013)

Singles from Good Morning Vietnam EP
- 1. "Be Noble" Released: January 8, 2013; 2. "Time" Released: February 16, 2013

The Good Morning Vietnam EP is an eight-track, 2012 extended play by underground hip hop artists MF Grimm & Drasar Monumental released on prominent underground label Vendetta Vinyl. The album was preceded by the promotional mixtape Preemptive Strike earlier the same year. The EP follows the theme of the Vietnam war as a very loose thematic backdrop and is the first of three planned releases between the two artists on the Vendetta Vinyl label. The EP's CD and digital mp3 releases only contain one twenty-minute track to give the feel of a vinyl release. While both the CD and 12" Vinyl releases advertise that the album contains the instrumentals, only the vinyl release actually does, on the B side. The full-length sequel, Good Morning Vietnam 2: The Golden Triangle was released in 2013.

== Preemptive Strike Mixtape ==
Prior to the release of Good Morning Vietnam Drasar Monumental compiled and performed a two-part DJ mix of both MF Grimm's older material as well as some of the new material appearing on the first iteration of the trilogy. The mix was sold digitally from Drasar's and the Vendetta Vinyl Vietnam Bandcamp pages and is still available. It serves as a sort of prequel to the Good Morning Vietnam trilogy bridging between Grimm's previous material and the new collaborative team.

== Reception ==
Professional ratings
Review scores
Source	Rating
Fifth Element Online	favourable
RapReviews.com	7.5/10

Fan reaction to Good Morning Vietnam was overwhelmingly positive, with the initial pressing of the 12" vinyl and CD release of EP sold out in one month, according to the Vendetta Vinyl website. Despite no promotion by major magazines the EP has sold extremely well, selling out on Amazon.com, as well as other retail outlets. This success has been a contributing factor to the continued partnership between Grimm and Drasar Monumental, who say that so long as their fans continue to support them, they don't care about a lack of support by mainstream outlets. During an interview with the Lost Tapes, MF Grimm claimed that despite still liking his past work, he feels that this is his best work so far. RapReviews.com reviewed the EP very positively, citing both MF Grimm's lyricism and Drasar Monumental's production as highlights and draws for multiple listens.

== Track listing ==
- All tracks produced by Drasar Monumental

No.	Title	Length
1.	"Good Morning Vietnam"	2:51
2.	"Tangerine"	1:19
3.	"If You Don't Know"	3:29
4.	"Be Noble"	4:03
5.	"Solar Soul Controller"	1:23
6.	"Grand Opening"	1:58
7.	"Interlude"	2:01
8.	"Mater Matuta"	3:14
Total length:		20:14
