= Monsta Island Czars =

American hip hop group

- Origin: New York City, U.S.
- Genre: Hip-hop
- Years active: 1993–2008, 2010
- Labels: Brick9000 (2000); Metal Face (2003); Day By Day (2003-2008)
- Past members: MF Grimm (Superstar Jet Jaguar); Ahmed (MechaGodzilla); Big Bad Baragon (BARAGON/Moguera); B-Wyze; CX KidtroniK; Fatman Scoop (Deceased); Gamera; Gonzo; InfinitEVOL (Grimlock); Junclassic (Gabarah) (Deceased); Kongcrete (Kong) (Deceased); KEO/Lord Scotch (Lord Smog); K.Sise (Monsta X); Kurious (Gappa/Biolante); Kwite Def (Kamackeris); Majesty (GAMMA-RA) (Deceased); MeccaGodZilla; MF Bash (Bashton Da Invizabul Mang/Invisible Man); MF Doom (King Geedorah) (Deceased); MF Mez (Destroyah); RapOet (King Orga); Raylong (Monsta Zero); Roc Raida (Deceased); RODAN; Spiega (Deceased); Subroc (SpaceGodZilla) (Deceased); Tommy Gunn (Megalon) (Deceased); Wayne-O (Pip); X-Ray Da Mindbenda (King Cesar) (Deceased); Yves St. LaRock (Deceased); Zamir the Dutch Master Sword (Gigan)

Monsta Island Czars (M.I.C.) was a New York City-based hip-hop collective that was formed by MF Grimm in 1993, and included MF Doom, among numerous New York MCs, music producers, DJs, visual artists, break-dancers, and entrepreneurs.

== History ==
The majority of the group were given aliases riffing on the Kaiju ("strange beast" or "monster") in Toho's Godzilla movies. Escape from Monsta Island!, their only officially-released full-length album, was released in 2003 by Metal Face Records and Benn Grimm Entertainment. Most of the tracks on the album were produced by X-Ray or King Geedorah (MF Doom).

It was rumored in 2003 that a follow-up album was set to release, titled Return To Monsta Island, however, this was dispelled in a 2007 interview with X-Ray. Fans soon became unsure whether the group was on hiatus or had broken up. Clues included the collective's MySpace webpage being deleted and their official site (monstaisland.com) going dark. In 2007, rumors continued that M.I.C. was still active and working on new tracks, but nothing seemed to come out of it. The group broke up in 2008 but briefly reunited in 2010.

In 2013 and 2016, X-Ray (as King Cesar) released two new albums titled All Hail the King and All the King's Men, featuring multiple former members of M.I.C., including Gabarah, Kamackeris, Kong, Megalon, Monsta X, Rodan, and Spiega.

== Discography ==
=== Studio album ===
Album title	Album info
Escape from Monsta Island!	Released: February 18, 2003; Label: Metal Face Records/Rhymesayers Entertainment

=== Other releases ===
- The Next 1,099 Years (1999)
- "Run the Sphere" [single/EP] (2000)
- "Escape!" [single/EP] (2003)
- "The Come Up" [EP] (2014)
- Monsta Mixes [compilation] (2024)
