= Music on The Shield =

Album

Music plays an important role on the FX television drama The Shield. Stylistically, the music ranged from hip hop (Master P) to mainstream pop (Duran Duran) to rock (Kid Rock) to country music (Johnny Cash), often within a single episode. Each continuing season had promotional music as well.

Episode title	Artist	Song title	Scene description
Pilot
Track 1	Megatrax	Ponle Cadera	At the beginning of the chase, when Booty puts drugs inside the mouth row.
Track 2	Maraca	Descarga Total	Strike Team running through the store for Booty hiding his drug stash.
Track 3	Moby	Graciosa	David Aceveda meeting with Terry Crowley at the park to put him undercover.
Track 4	Tha Mexakinz	La Plaga	Vic Mackey and Shane Vendrell visiting Miguel Esteana and making him lose the charges against them.
Track 5	Monster Magnet	God Says No	Vic meets Fred for information about the missing girl
Track 6	Los Lobos	Maricela	Vic visits Connie and forcefully requests Dmitris bankroll.
Track 7	Stevie Wonder	Higher Ground	While Vic is grilling at his house, Terry is talking with him.
Track 8	Stephen James Edwards	Melisma Alleluia	Aceveda, Dutch and Claudette rescuing the young child.
Track 9	Kid Rock	Bawitdaba	End montage.
Track 10	BZ	Fantastic Planet	Danny and Julien talking in the patrol car while driving in the deleted scene
Our Gang
Track 1	Cage	A Crowd Killer	Terry Crowleys condition announced outside of the hospital
Track 2	Mike Jimenez & Daniel Indart	Dámelo	Aceveda sees his colleague from the Department of Justice to talk about what went down with Terry Crowley.
Track 3	United States Air Force Reserve Pipe Band	Amazing Grace	At Terry Crowley's and 2Time's funeral monologue.
Track 4	Bernie Marsden	Highway 45	In Vic's flashback with Terry in the clubhouse.
Track 5	The Urbanites	Rock Tha Spot	Danny & Julien take Marlon Demeral for questioning.
Track 6	Bernie Marsden	Like Lightnin Strikin	Strike Team playing cards, Terry describing himself as Gene Simmons. (Mackey's flashback)
Track 7	Paul Lenart & Bill Novick	Kansas City Feel	Strike Team visit Van Bro on the street for information.
Track 8	Peyote Asesino	Perkins	Gang association arresting scene.
Track 9	India Arie	Promises	End montage of David Aceveda and Vic making eye contact.
The Spread
Track 1	Young Dre	Dance With the Devil	Strike Team busts into Virgil's apartment to find Derek Tripp.
Track 2	Flight 180	Sunday Jack	Dutch & Claudette, with SWAT bust in a house and find their sperm collector.
Track 3	Matt Anthony	Pinched In	Vic Mackey saves a baby from a crackhead.
Track 4	Delinquent Habits	Que Vuelva	End montage.
Dawg Days
Track 1	Out of Order featuring Lil John Show A Lil Mo	Twerk That Thang	
Track 2	Artifacts	Wrong Side of da Tracks	[Instrumental] Kern's girl announces something in the microphone.
Track 3	Copywrite	Tower of Babble (feat. Smut Peddlers)	In the club before the shooting and T-Bonz arriving.
Track 4	Tame One, Copywrite, J-Zone, Cage, Mr Eon & Skillz	All Stars Air Max 95 Remix	[Instrumental] The shooting starts in the shake club between Kern and his rival T-Bonz.
Track 5	Los Corales	Ese Es Mi Amigo	David Aceveda and his husband Aurora visit the politician rally to find new contacts.
Track 6	Abby Dobson	Deeply	Vic and Lem visit Kern Little's music studio.
Track 7	SX-10	Heart of a Rebel	Vic and Lem arrive and investigate a street shootout.
Track 8	Los Pinguos	Alegria	Dutch and Claudette run after the migrant worker as he escapes through a small hole in the fence.
Track 9	Zamp Nicall	The Streets of Iran	As Danny Sofer exits the bar and is threatened at gunpoint by one of Rondell's guys.
Blowback
Track 1	Seda Garibyan	Hyots Aghunak	At the beginning where Vic and Ronnie arrive to the apartment and place a wiretap.
Track 2	3rd Root	Wah Wah	Lem and Shane talk about Rondell's drugs.
Track 3	SX-10	Caught Up In The System	Strike Team preps for the bust in the club house.
Track 4	Haissmavourk Choir	Yerg Votnlvai [1] (Hymn for the Washing of the Feet)	Margos guys snorting drugs before the take down.
Track 5	Trailer Park Casanovas	Beer (feat. El Vez)	Shane arrives at Amy's place.
Track 6	Push	The Flute Song	Vic and Shane meet officer Hoffman in the cafe for information about their missing SUV.
Track 7	Project 86	Rebuttal	Vic has a knife pointed at the guy in the store and asks him about their missing drugs.
Track 8	Jason Darling	One By One	Julien Lowe visits Tomas.
Track 9	Bernie Marsden	Ballad of Joliet	End of the episode where Dutch rolls by his car seeing Vic kiss Danny.
Cherrypoppers
Track 1	Zamp Nicall	Under the Midnight Sun	Vic meets Connie on the street and asks about his case he is working on.
Track 2	Lee Jung-Hyun	Crazy	Strike Team visits Korea Town bar for suspects.
Track 3	Jim Blake	Forbidden Fruit	Vic enters the sex club just before the stage curtains open.
Track 4	Mozart String Serenade No.13	Eine Kleine Nachtmusik KV525 Second Movement	Man in the mask is undressing underage Sun Lee.
Track 5	Gregg Montante	Night In The City	Strike Team and the uniformed officers sweep the illegal sex club.
Track 6	Buckcherry	Whiskey In the Morning	Vic meets Kurt, the alleged cherry popper movie maker.
Track 7	Cardia	Love Loss	Ending montage of Dutch sitting at Danny's porch and her inviting him to dinner.
Pay in pain
Track 1	Los Pinguos	Fumaza	Beginning of the episode at the shooting range.
Track 2	Danny Wood	Get Away	Vic and Shane sit in the car, Shane finds the book about autism in from his car and making a racist joke about it.
Track 3	Bernie Marsden	Heartbreaker	Julien Lowe asking Tomas if he even has a long-term plan to get his life together.
Track 4	La Maraca	Arte Mixto	Vic asks H'aime the description of the shooter.
Track 5	Stephen Edwards	Montfort	Dutch and Claudette at the sidekicks house asking her to come to the station.
Track 6	Dislocated Styles	Fire in the Hole	Vic talks to Suzanne Klassen outside of her front yard.
Track 7	Mariachi La Estrella	Amor No Te Vayas Mariachi	At the store when Vic asks Shane if SID check the blood pool.
Track 8	Gerard McMahon	Sugar Fine	Dutch going back to the sidekick asking for the message.
Track 9	Mogwai	Take Me Somewhere Nice	Ending scene with Julien and Tomas, when Vic abruptly breaks into the apartment.
Cupid and Psycho
Track 1	SX-10	Erase Me	One of Fran's boyfriends charges the other one, Julien & Danny arrive to scenery.
Track 2	Lootpack	Laws of Physics	Hooper can painted Fran's door, Julien & Danny try to make peace.
Track 3	Sam Black Church	We Got the Youth	Vic and Claudette visit the campus.
Track 4	The Soul Brothers Six	Where You Gonna Find Another Fool	Danny gives Fran some advice about men.
Track 5	The Magnetic Fields	All My Little Words	End montage.
Throwaway
Track 1	Brujeria	Cuiden a los Ninos	Trucking is getting hijacked at the beginning.
Track 2	Kinto Sol	Como Secundaria	Vic Mackey meets with the tattoo artist for his sketch.
Track 3	Julieta Venegas	Salvavídas	Lem secures Tigre's place.
Track 4	Julieta Venegas	Voluntad	Lem at Tigre's place talking with her about his haircut.
Track 5	Cage9	Nacionabisom	Curtis Lemansky confronts Hector with punches.
Track 6	Conejo	Lets Ride	Strike Team robs the evidence truck.
Track 7	Kinto Sol	El Capitan	Strike Team raiding Hector's house.
Track 8	Julieta Venegas	Fe	End montage, Lem cuddling with Tigre.
Dragonchasers
Track 1	Zach Tempest	Anthem	Beginning montage in the strip club.
Track 2	Goleta	Satelitte	Playing at the van, when Lem and Shane getting to listen Ronnie's wiretap.
Track 3	Goleta	Sing Along	Shane getting a strip from Tulips, and suggestion from her to go outside.
Track 4	Erinn Williams a.k.a. Hunter	I Am King	Dutch talks to Shawn at his car mechanic garage.
Track 5	Mogwai	Helicon 1	Connie recovering from her recent intoxication, escapes from Ronnie's watch.
Track 6	Hedder	Pull You Into Me	Dutch sitting into his car at the end of the episode.
Carnivores
Track 1	SX-10	Punk Ass	Shane and Ronnie go out on the streets for information of Rondell's drug competition.
Track 2	Pagliacci & Mario Lanza	Vesti La Guibba	Acaveda enters the Maureen place for the first time after many years have passed.
Track 3	Lee Hee Hee (이가희)	Mill (밀)	Dutch and Claudette are at the store questioning the store owner and asking to give out the evidence.
Track 4	Daniel Indart	Los Parranderos	Julien chasing a kid with a gun at the birthday party.
Track 5	Goldo	All I Really Want	Dutch and Claudette with SWAT raid the apartment of home invasionist boys.
Track 6	The Royal Philharmonic	Casta Diva	David Acaveda visiting Maureen, hoping she will finally recant her story about the rape allegations.
Track 7	Luther Guitar Junior Johnson	I'm Gone	At the end of the episode, Dutch and Claudette being in the crime scene.
Two days of Blood
Track 1	Jesus Alejandro El Nino	Como Te Gusta (Remix)	In the beginning when the guys are drunk and elevated by their cocks fighting in the pit arena.
Track 2	DJ Curse, Soulstice	Superfunk 2000	Street corner drug deal goes very wrong.
Track 3	Henri Yonet	Mystery	Acaveda and Claudette question the witness woman about the grove murders.
Track 4	Delinquent Habits	Freedom Band	Vic interrupts gang hangout.
Track 5	Tony Cook	Teeny Bopper	Danny Sofer and Julien Lowe respond to Dukeys garage sale.
Track 6	Maraca	Pa'Gozar Pilón	Shane bird wins the first fight in the night.
Track 7	Steve Reynolds	Even Now	SWAT raids an apartment including Acaveda and Claudette.
Track 8	Xocoyotzin Herrera	Esperanza	Shane is inside cockfighting arena, his bird is losing out.
Track 9	Bobby Byrd	On the Move	Dukey gets arrested.
Track 10	Rumblefish	Statistic(Roy Mayorga mix)	Riot breaks out at the end of the episode.
Circles
Track 1	Project 86	Spill Me	Danny & Julien get ambushed, early in the episode.
Track 2	Conejo	Planet Los Angeles	Vic and Shane chase an alleged witness of the shooting to the alleyway.
Track 3	Transultra	From Out	Comes from the alleyway when Vic blasts through the fence and starts talking to the boy.
Track 4	Push	Eddie's Thing - 1987	Vic meets with Tio in the street.
Track 5	Transultra	O'Chanko	Vic and Shane approach the door where Sonny's junkie dad is living at.
Track 6	Ill Nino	Nothing's Clear	Acaveda and the whole department of the Barn chase the drive by shooters.
Track 7	Jaya the Cat	Cultifornia	Danny & Julien visit a woman who made an emergency call.
Track 8	Coldplay	Trouble	Ending montage with Vic having a mental breakdown.

Music supervisors	Music editor
Season 1
P.J. Bloom, Ray Espinola Jr., Evyen Klean	Zamp Nicall

Episode title	Artist	Song title	Scene description
The Quick Fix
Track 1	Whitehouse	Quentan Que El	Plays at the beginning of the episode, gang setting up the murder execution.
Track 2	Donatella	Under the Moon	Vic breaks into the apartment on the information Gordie gave him about his wife.
Track 3	Dilated Peoples, Lootpack	Long Awaited	Vic brings Alvarez in the rival hood to sweat him for information.
Track 4	Muffy	Overthrown	Passing car near Dannys apartment, when she is laying down and Vic putting his clothes on.
Track 5	Francisco Javier Gonzalez	El Indio Y El Vaquero	Strike Team arrives to Mexico.
Track 6	Richard Cottle	Gypsy Fire	Strike Team move in to bust Navarro near the restaurant.
Track 7	Julianne Richards	Get To You	Maya comes back home, Claudette runs to her.
Track 8	Kenny Wayne Shepherd	Blue on Black	Ending scene with Acaveda and Vic.
Dead Soldiers
Track 1	Kinto Sol	No Muerdas la Mano	Armadillo's gang hanging out and getting inked in the beginning of the episode.
Track 2	Los Pinguos	Mi Manera de Amarte	Strike Team visits Armadillo's house in the early morning to ask about his whereabouts.
Track 3	Nawal Al Zoghbi	Ghib An Aynaya	Julien and Danny inspect the apartment where the woman complained the smell coming from.
Track 4	Supervision	Baby	Danny Sofer confronts the armed man Zayed Al-Thani.
Track 5	Whitehouse	Cuentan Que El	At the end.
Partners
Track 1	Tantric	Breakdown	Opening to the episode and credits running.
Track 2	Jade Esteban Estrada	Bella Morena	Dutch talking at the crime scene where the guy found the amputated arm near the trashcan.
Track 3	Zamp Nicall	Fifty Second Street	Dutch asks Marcy and Bob to come to the police station to give statements about the missing girl with amputated arm.
Track 4	Gil Bernal	Easyville - 1954	Vic and Joe Clarke are talking in the cafe.
Track 5	Outlawz, Jayo Felony	Rockin (feat. Jayo Felony)	(Instrumental) When Vic and Joe Clarke arrive near apartment building and Fleetwood comes throwing cash at Clarke.
Track 6	Zamp Nicall	Faces in The Crowd	Claudette and Dutch visit Bob and Marcy again. They are about to drive out of the parking garage.
Track 7	Black Toast music	Down With Me	Vic and Joe Clarke catch Taylor Orrs on the street.
Track 8	Debemos Creer	Bye Sami	Vic visits his former partner Joe Clarks apartment. Joe rants about his lawsuit.
Track 9	F.Y.N.E	Make Ya Head Pop Off	Fleetwood sits into his car and drives off.
Track 10	Diana Lee	My Man	Shane forces a confession out of Fleetwoods girl.
Track 11	Michael Penn	Whole Truth	Shane walks in the hospital room. Visibly upset Dutch walks into washroom.
Carte Blanche
Track 1	Geddin Ug'Lee	Extreme	Taylor Orrs is having his van sale near the curb of the street.
Track 2	Tresspasser	Bad Medicine	Vic wants information from the store owner who owned the jewels.
Track 3	The Rhythm Machine	The Kick	Vic and Shane catch the guy on the store who knocked off his Armenian partner.
Track 4	Narine Shahbazian	Broyi Broyi	Vic shows Alex Esnik the missing jewels in the bar lounge.
Track 5	John Fiddy, Helen Welch, Orchestra John Fiddy	Everytime We Meet	Vic takes a motel room at the end of the episode.
Greenlit
Track 1	North Mississippi Allstars	Drinking Muddy Water	Strike Team clubhouse playing cards in the beginning.
Track 2	Universal Production Music	East Coast Strut	Claudette is in the store questioning the storekeeper.
Track 3	Slim and The Soulful Saints	Fish Head	Dutch & Claudette are questioning witness about Earl.
Track 4	Santana	Corazón Espinado (feat. Maná)	Shane discussing money train with Lem and Vic and Ronnie in other car seeing Enrique walking to the spot.
Track 5	Kinto Sol	Que Risa Me Da	Enrique gets busted undercover and Strike Team raids the house.
Track 6	Tha Mexakinz	Phonkie Melodia	Vic chokes Eduardo with a towel for Armadillos location.
Track 7	Whitehouse	Cuentan Que El	Coming from the house at the end of the episode.
Homewrecker
Track 1	Campagnia D'Opera Italiane	Medamina! (Don Giovanni)	Coming from Gordies car stereo when talking to Vic.
Track 2	Babaloo	Trabalengua	Vic and Shane question the pimp.
Track 3	Ill Harmonics	Take Two (Call Me In the Morning)	Aceveda and Julien stop a kid on a bike and talk to him.
Track 4	Click Tha Supah Latin	4 My People	Julien is in the duty with Aceveda, they recover the boys bike Aceveda accidentally stole.
Track 5	Dragbeat	Pure Dirt	Connie is taken hostage, Vic enters the apartment to negotiate.
Track 6	Radio Mundial	Me Voy	Aceveda and Julien return the bike to the rightful owner.
Barnstormers
Track 1	Daryl Hall & John Oates	Rich Girl	In the beginning, Lem keeps imitating/singing this song.
Track 2	Tree	Subdued	Coming from the apartment when Vic & Shane make a deal with Leith.
Track 3	James Speer	It Would Seem	Dutch rips up the evidence bra for his case in the car.
Track 4	Road Kings	Gunslinger	In Shane's car stereo when he's going to meet Herk with Tulips.
Track 5	Pete Droge	I Can't Help from Crying Sometime	At the end, Vic finds Ronnie on his apartment kitchen floor.
Scar Tissue
Track 1	Pete Droge	I Can't Help from Crying Sometime	Ronnie Gardocki being hauled away at the beginning on the stretcher.
Track 2	Stoic Frame	Demonios	Leashed dog attacks Shane at the backyard.
Track 3	V1RT7U4L	Sin Oxigeno	Strike Team breaks into another territory with one guy working on the truck and another one in the front.
Track 4	Las Quince Letras	Sueno Purepecha	Inside Armadillos building when he sees strike team block all his exit/entrances.
Track 5	Flogging Molly	If I Ever Leave This World Alive	End montage.
Co-Pilot
Track 1	Black Uhuru	Justice	Vic and Shane question Ringo.
Track 2	Grupo Imperio	Quiero Ver	Danny & Julien get breakfast from the food truck and notice a bloody female victim
Track 3	B Dastardly	I-Witness	Danny & Julien arrest Karlton Johnson.
Track 4	Roy Wootton	I Do Like To Be Beside the Seaside	Vic and Shane listening to the wiretap they put on Connie to be sure she is safe putting drugs under the sink. While camera shows the carousel.
Track 5	The Neckbones	Gangstafied	When Strike Team searches for drugs Connie planted under the sink and arrest the guy afterwards.
Track 6	Grupo Imperio	Enamórate	
Track 7	Dave Anderson	Cool Guitar Blues	End of the episode with Terry Crowley end montage joining in with the Strike Team, Lem coming off from shower and Julien seeing his naked butt.
Coyotes
Track 1	Chucho Merchan	Funba Rumba	Some Latino women brawl on the street and Julien commands one of them to spit out the knife.
Track 2	Simon Stokes	Jungle Music	Gilroy is in the bar drinking.
Track 3	Mariachi La Estrella	Dorado	Plays very shortly from the coyotes van when he arrives to the drop off point with the migrants.
Track 4	Element	Superkollider	Claudette and Dutch search for Nancy in the dark building.
Inferno
Track 1	Fanny Grace	Fade Away	Beginning of the episode, Julien chases a suspect into a clothing store.
Track 2	Onyx	Bring 'Em Out Dead	Kern wants to bring Vic and his team into his drug game.
Track 3	Jasz	Take It to Da Flo	Tavon asks the manager if they could get inside Froggers apartment.
Track 4	Sam Sneed	2 Tha Floor	Strike Team raids Froggers apartment, coming from stereo.
Track 5	Kelis	Mafia	Vic, Shane visit Kern for to tell they can't be part of his business and they still owe him for the tip for Dante Fell.
Track 6	Angela Johnson	No Better Love	Vic visits Kern again, admitting his mistake with earlier business model they had with Rondell.
Track 7	Map of Wyoming	Hilltop	In the end of the episode Corrine visits Vic about the lawyer he hired for the custody case.
Breakpoint
Track 1	Orchestra Heinz Kiessling	Martini Genie	Julien visits Tomas in the cafe for the last time with his counselor.
Track 2	Unida	Thorn	Vic and Shane check up the sex store.
Track 3	Grahame McLean, Pat Lee, Stephan North	Eensy Weensy Spider	Corrine is bathing Meghan in the bathtub when Vic has to break into the house setting off the alarm.
Track 4	Michael Melvoin	Sunflower	Playing in the restaurant when Claudette chats up with Chief Bankston.
Dominoes Falling
Track 1	Daniel Ash	Trouble	Vic and his team visit Radiohead.
Track 2	Grand Drive	Firefly	Ronnie enters Armenian money site with the garbage truck. Shane and Lem waiting inside preparing to go out.
Track 3	Littles, Big Noyd	Ghetto Starzz (feat. Big Noyd)	Tavon plays faked Russian roulette with the gun on the suspect.
Track 4	Cabula	Poder de la Mujer	Vic and Tavon at the fairy searching for the shooter.
Track 5	Nailah Porter	The Scene	Plays when Julien and her wife Vanessa doing chores.
Track 6	Live	Overcome	End montage of the episode.

Music supervisors	Music editor
Season 2
P.J. Bloom, Ray Espinola Jr., Evyen Klean	Zamp Nicall

Episode title	Artist	Song title	Scene description
Playing Tight
Track 1	Rupert Holmes	Escape (The Piña Colada Song)	At the beginning, Strike Team on the stakeout.
Track 2	Kameil Madison	Rock Ya Body	At Kern's club; Vic and Shane come to ask about the guns.
Track 3	Gargantua Soul	Rat Pack	Lem and Shane listen to the wiretap they left on Kern Little's, Lem notices a car passing by with music on.
Track 4	Spider Harrison	Beautiful Day	Vic meets up with his guys at the crime scene.
Track 5	Kings of Leon	Holy Roller Novocaine	Vic taking some of the money train cash at the end of the episode, Shane buying the Lexus for Mara.
Blood and Water
Track 1	Bermudez Triangle	Cu-Cu-Cumbia	Vic and Shane meet Garza near fast food place.
Track 2	Paco	Maria	Julien Lowe and Tommy Hisk arrive to a fresh crime scene.
Track 3	Phaser	Sway	Shane having a talk with Mara about Vic and their relationship.
Track 4	Volovan	No Quieres Venir	Dutch and Claudette at the barber shop questioning the woman.
Track 5	Tattoo Ink	La Quemazon	Coming from Garzas drug lab.
Track 6	Willie Nelson	Nothing I Can Do About It Now	Strike Team at the bay, ending montage.
Bottom Bitch
Track 1	St.John	Crack in the Street	Hooker talks to Tavon, Strike Team is working their regular john's sting.
Track 2	Karry Walker	Fillmore	Tavon and Shane get solicitated by queen prostitute Cocoa.
Track 3	Dispatch	Here We Go	Tavon and Shane try to run down the metal door, before Coco tries to flush the drugs.
Track 4	Jonny Lang	Long Time Coming	Vic is talking to Farah at the end.
Track 5	Mudhoney	Inside Job	Shane is having a small engagement party in his place with Mara.
Streaks and Tips
Track 1	Chucho Merchan	Ahead on Points	A lady is spying from the curtains while strike team approaches Danny's apartment.
Track 2	Sam Black Church	New God Science	Deena arrives with the guy. Setup for the Strike Team to bust in.
Track 3	James Speer	Already Gone	Shane and Tavon are talking before the fight.
Track 4	Addison Groove Project	Canopy	Tavon hits the ground through the vans windshield with his head injury, passing car has this song on.
Track 5	Billy Squier	The Stroke	At the end, the Decoy Squad stripping because of the lost bet.
Mum
Track 1	Los Violadores	1, 2, Ultraviolento	Strike Team arrives to the Alvarado Corridor to sweep speedracers gathering around all over the place.
Track 2	Spigga	Papa Knows	Vic forces a bong inside Juan Lozano's throat.
Track 3	Greencastle Homer, Terran Eve	You and Me	Claudette calms down Luanne who holds a gun in her hand.
Posse Up
Track 1	Deltron 3030	3030	Vic arrives near drug crib to investigate for a suspect.
Track 2	Honkeyball	So Called Friends	Julien and Vic arrest the guy who killed Tommy's family.
Track 3	The Vienna Chamber Ensemble, Wolfgang Amadeus Mozart	Ave Verum	At the house, Vic argues with Corrine about seeing Owen.
Track 4	Andy Stochansky	Everest	Vic tells the Strike Team the marked bills list is in Aceveda's safe.
Safe
Track 1	Banda La Estrella	El Chino y el Alacran (feat. Xocoyotzin Herrera)	Strike Team take Otilio to questioning from the streets.
Track 2	John Eddie	Place You Go	At the end, David Aceveda goes to his cousin about his assault, coming from the garage.
Cracking Ice
Track 1	The Sheila Divine	Black River	Vic and Lauren have sex early in episode.
Track 2	Joseph Charles, Stephen McIntosh	Maybe Young	Vic and Shane visit Desirae at the hair salon.
Track 3	James Speer	Already Gone	Danny and Dutch in the car noticing the practicing cuckhold mastrubating near the window.
Track 4	Baby Bash	Feelin Me	Playing in the background when Lil Syke and Trish begin to have sex while she is undercover.
Track 5	Phaser	Sway	Played during end montage while Shane gives Mara an engagement ring.
Slipknot
Track 1	Dudley Perkins	Washedbrainsyndrome	Vic comes to Twizzy to offer him to give up the priest killer.
Track 2	Dudley Perkins	Yo' Soul	Vic takes Twizzy's guns from the table.
Track 3	Steve Earle	Ashes to Ashes	Plays during ending montage, the Decoy Squad clearing out of the Barn and Strike Team raiding Russians on the compound.
What Power Is...
Track 1	M-16	Sentimientos Rotos	Aceveda ON the watch of Juan Luzano in the beginning.
Track 2	Blue Mountain	Riley and Spencer	On Shane's car stereo just before Mara calls about her mom wanting more money.
Strays
Track 1	Los Reyes Del Bajo Mundo	Y Por Que	Trick escapes Strike Teams custody. A random car passes by aftermath with that song on.
Track 2	The Sheila Divine	Dramatica	Shane asks Mara to go to Vegas to get married.
Track 3	Jimmy & The Hillisbillys	Anything	Vic and Lauren snuggling in the bedroom.
Riceburner
Track 1	The Peasants	Forty Lines	Ronnie notices Shane's wedding ring, comes from clubhouse.
Track 2	Ziroq	Pobre Corazon	Dutch is questioning a witness with Claudette in a store.
Track 3	Opeat Got	Belief (신념)	Vic and Shane break into Tracy's illegal credit card theft operations room.
Track 4	Deux (듀스)	Forever (힘들어)	Strike Team goes through a store front before breaking into a video game room.
Track 5	Korean Folk Music Ensemble	Shinawi	Strike Team goes back to Tracy, Vic is about to arrest her but changes his mind.
Track 6	Kim Kwang Jin	Solveig	At the house when Vic catches Kim.
Track 7	Gordie Sampson	Hangin' By a Wire	Vic and Corrine talk about their custody time.
Fire In The Hole
Track 1	Brown Eyez	Woe	Lem notes to Vic that they never should have taken the money, coming from nearby apartment complex.
All In
Track 1	Ween	It's Gonna Be a Long Night	Strike Team is shaking down a group on the street.
Track 2	Meliah Rage	Barely Human	Strike Team halts the half empty gas truck.
Track 3	Nune Yesayan	Tamam Ashkharh	Margos stabs Sosi, while strike team pinpoints his location in the building.
On Tilt
Track 1	Rokk	Patience	At the store, Danny and Julien talk with Robert Huggins.
Track 2	Harout Pamboukjian	Te Atcheres	Near the beginning, Strike Team busts into a house.
Track 3	Dwight Yoakam	The Back of Your Hand	Coming from Shane's car stereo when he leaves at the end of the episode.

Music supervisors	Music editor
Season 3
Ray Espinola Jr., Evyen Klean	Zamp Nicall

Episode title	Artist	Song title	Scene description
The Cure
Track 1	Jesus Alejandro El Nino	Rebulu	The beginning montage of serving the warrant.
Track 2	Jimmy and The Hillisbillys	Lets Hillisbilly	Officer Scooby struggles with the aggressive dog in the apartment.
Track 3	Master P	Ooohhwee (feat. Markita)	Captain Monica Rawling asks T-Gun to turn around at the cafe.
Track 4	Graham MacLean, Pat Lee, Stephan North	Skip To My Lou	Monica Rawling is comforting the found crying boy.
Track 5	Lars-Luis Linek	Hope	Vic beats up the father who beat his kid on the garage sting tape.
Track 6	Tech-I-La	Tus Besos	Was playing shortly when Vic was tackling the rape suspect of that child.
Track 7	Doctor Ross	Good Thing Blues	Vic and Shane are talking inside Dead Eye's house.
Grave
Track 1	Mary Love	More Love	In the beginning, Army and Shane entering the sex shop.
Track 2	Christian Padovan, Stephane Huguenin, Yves Sanna	The Other Day	Shane talks to Army to pocket the drugs for by busts at sex shop.
Track 3	Funkhouse With Candy	Tenderness	Antwon Mitchell and some of his crew help to build the wreck center when Vic pays a visit about his case.
Track 4	Laurie Burgess	Best in Me	The boy runs into the store swallowing the drugs, while Strike Team follow him. Music comes from store.
Track 5	Dropkick Murphys	Amazing Grace	At the end of the funeral; Aceveda packing up his office and Rawling setting hers up.
Bang
Track 1	Mr Badwrench	Gasoline	Vic, Ronnie and Lem meet up in the bar to discuss Shane's shady dealings with Antwon.
Track 2	Mikal Raymo	Lay Down	Plays on the pornographic video for the TV set.
Track 3	PM The New Blues Revival	Virginia-Highland Walk	Vic, Shane and Army visit Terrence Ross in his video editing studio.
Doghouse
Track 1	Dahlia	Forget This Place	Aceveda smoking in the bar lounge and chatting with high class escort Sara.
Track 2	Stoic Frame	Otro Caido En El Callejon	Vic & Ronnie chase the rapist to backyard.
Track 3	Dahlia	Live in Light	David Aceveda meets Sara escort woman at her house.
Track 4	Grant Lee Buffalo	Demon Called Deception	End montage of Vic taking a huge look around at the Barn.
Tar Baby
Track 1	Duran Duran	Hungry Like The Wolf	Played in Dutch's car as he sings to it, unaware that he's being recorded for the sting project.
Insurgents
Track 1	Les Choeurs de L'Armée Rouge, Boris Alexandrov	Katioucha (Катю́ша)	Ronnie is talking with Vic about the recent wiretap on the russian cab in the club house, song emits from earphones.
Hurts
Track 1	Vivian Ann Romero, Ernesto J.Bautista & Rodney Alejandro	The Shield Theme	Julien and Danny stop a passing car, noticing the weed smell.
Track 2	And You Will Know Us By the Trail of Dead	Will You Smile Again For Me	Plays during end montage of Vic walking outside of rain and Shane trying to contact his CI.
Cut Throat
Track 1	Alice In Chains	Nutshell	Played at the start of opening credits, while Vic is driving to meet Monica Rawling.
String Theory
Track 1	Juan Del Castillo & Daniel Indart	Somos Mexicanos	Officers having a lunch in the beginning, including Danny, Julien with Scooby and Carl having a chat.
Back In The Hole
Track 1	Jose Leon	Quiero Bailar Contigo	Lem pays a visit to Bettario at his house with Emolia Mendez seeing the drugs Lemansky takes with him.
A Thousand Deaths
Track 1	Vivian Ann Romero, Ernesto J.Bautista & Rodney Alejandro	The Shield Theme	Vic & Shane stakeout the judge.
Track 2	Crazy Anglos	Rushing In	Guys come in to the carwash where Billings is and shoot the nearby driver.
Track 3	Santino	Para Abajo Y Para Arriba	Vic visits Gusano with the Strike Team and says to stay away from Emolia and her kid.
Judas Priest
Ain't That A Shame
Track 1	Liza Carbe & Jean-Pierre Durand	Yo Te Traigo Amor	Strike Team is at Beneas store.
Track 3	Cheap Trick	Ain't That a Shame	Ending montage during the bar celebration and memorial, Monica Rawling drinking her beer at home.
Track 4	Roc Raida featuring Paradime	The Shield Theme (X-Ecutioners Remix)	Remix playing during Season 4 ending credits

Music supervisors	Music editor
Season 4
Ray Espinola Jr., Evyen Klean	Zamp Nicall

Episode title	Artist	Song title	Scene description
Extraction
Track 1	Livin Out Loud	Come On Baby	Strike Team talk to a store clerk.
Track 2	Coldplay	Til Kingdom Come	End montage.
Enemy of Good
Track 1	Harry Hayward	I'll Never Be Happy Again	Coming from Vic's car stereo at the beginning of the episode.
Track 2	Barrio Latino	No Quiero Tu Amor	Emits from Emolias house when Vic is talking to her about Doomsday.
Track 3	Stoic Frame	Sensacion De Placer	Strike Team returns to Doomsday's house where they tied him up.
Track 4	The Marvels	Hate Myself	Coming from the apartment complex, when Julien and Tina try to control intoxicated men.
Track 5	Enzo & Su Clan	Pa'l Salvador	Strike Team arrest Doomsday at the diner.
Jailbait
Track 1	Los Panchos	La Mucura	Julien & Tina arrive on the scenery to a big man laying on a woman.
Tapa Boca
Trophy
Track 1	St. John	Who You Leavin' Wit	Strike Team entering the strip club.
Track 2	22-20s	Devil In Me	Strike Team loading their weapons and preparing for the sting.
Rap Payback
Track 1	Madison Smartt Bell & Wyn Cooper	Anything Goes	End montage of Kavanaugh watching down on the Strike Team from upper office.
Man Inside
Track 1	Siop	Glass House	Coming from drug addict car stereo, when arriving to the wrong house.
Kavanaugh
Track 1	Jane Fuller	Gonna Cause Trouble	Emits from the diner, when Jon Kavanaugh is talking to Emolia.
Smoked
Track 1	The Hangmen	Blue Light	Coming from the Smitty's store, when Strike Team visits him about taking Lem's bail.
Of Mice and Lem
Track 1	St. John	Shake Ya Thang	Lem is having send off at the strip club with Strike Team just before the plans change.
Track 2	The Roues Brothers	Roadhouse USA	Just before end montage song starts to play, there is a short scene of the bartender with that on the radio.
Track 3	The Smashing Pumpkins	Disarm	End montage.
Post Partum
Track 1	Dirty Rig	Two	Lem can not stand the crying kid near the trailer park, he runs to help him.
Track 2	Marta Gomez	Pececito de Agua	Emits from the store when Strike Team visits Aldo at the shop.
Track 3	El Imperio	Controversiales	Strike Team raiding one of Guardo's stash houses.

Music supervisors	Music editor
Season 5
Ray Espinola Jr., Evyen Klean	Zamp Nicall

Episode title	Artist	Song title	Scene description
On The Jones
Track 1	Johnny Cash	I Hung My Head	Opening titles; Strike Team meets up and pays their final respects to Lem; End credits.
Track 2	The Robins	One Kiss	Strike Team investigates an apartment, just the moment when Ronnie describes the guys drug addiction.
Track 3	Laurent Lombard	Disco Pop Love	It comes from porn mag store.
Baptism By Fire
Track 1	El Imperio	Nena	Vic Mackey arriving near the gates of Santi's crib.
Track 2	Raza Pesada	El Maloso	Vic requesting Rocha's location at Santi's crib.
Back To One
Track 1	Dirty Rig	GTO	Ronnie, Dutch and Billings raid a meth house and question the woman.
Track 3	Bobby Rivas	Soy Guanaco Salvadoreno	Shane is talking to Vic over the car, watching over the trash bin over the street to watch when Guardo arrives.
Track 4	Melingo, Luciano Supervielle, Marcelo Gamboa, Contra Las Cuerdas	Miles De Pasajeros	Vic Mackey is invading Guardo's hiding place.
Track 5	A Flock of Seagulls	I Ran (So Far Away)	Coming from Dutch's car stereo while going to his place with Tina Hanlon.
The New Guy
Track 1	Ron Smooth	Any Otha Day	Vic and Hiatt talk to Moses on the street.
Track 2	TRU	Drama	Julien stopping the car with shooting victim laying on it.
Haunts
Track 1	G-Stack	Get It Done	Vic approaches Moses to talk about Shanes beating.
Track 2	Dex Elliot Sanders	Paralized	Vic and Ronnie talk to Tilli at the yard.
Track 3	Drive-By Truckers	18 Wheels of Love	Shane feeling guilt about Lem and snorting oxycotton in his car.
Track 4	Del Castillo	Mi Carino	Emits from the soccer field when Strike Team is making contact with Romero.
Chasing Ghosts
Track 1	Dirty Rig	GTO	During the raid on Snell’s apartment.
Exiled
Track 1	Rosita	Mariachi La Estrella	Strike Team entering the cafe, who Romero told to raid.
The Math of Wrath
Track 1	Ghazaryan	Adanayi Voghperke	At the beginning of the episode, Diro doing some sewing work.
Track 2	Celldweller	Own Little World	Diro Kesakhian is listening to this from her headphones on the way to the bus.
Track 3	Luny Tunes, Noriega and Baby Ranks	Motivate al Baile	Playing in front of Santi's compound.
Track 4	Hillisbillys	Got The Feeling	Coming from Shane's car stereo when he is getting carjacked by the armed guys.
Track 5	Ritchie Lo	Never Ending Dreams	Corrine, Tina and Danny enter the shop that will be closed down to grab some Gucci bags.
Recoil
Track 1	El Imperio featuring Shaeyla	Basilamos	Vic, Hiatt and Julien want Xavier for questioning.
Track 2	El Maloso	Verde, Blanco y Rojo	Vic convincing Santi to wait for another day of retribution for San Marcos murders.
Track 3	Jesus Alejandro El Nino	A Comer	Vic, Hiatt, Ronnie and Julien in the bar looking for the suspect.
Track 4	The Brand New Heavies	Boogie	Hiatt is having sex with Tina Hanlon, Dutch awkwardly gets setup for this by his partner detective Billings.
Spanish Practices
Track 1	Donald Stuart Seigal	Early Warning	Passing car on the street has a radio on, while Vic was writing a note about the limousine he was following.
Track 2	Skripture	Interview - Respek	Emits from the gangbangers porch.
Track 3	Mariachi La Estrella	No Te Rajes	Coming from the street when Vic is about to arrest a boy who is about to initiate a shooting.

Music supervisors	Music editor
Season 6
Ray Espinola Jr., Evyen Klean	Zamp Nicall

Episode title	Artist	Song title	Scene description
Coefficient of Drag
Track 1	Social Distortion	Reach For the Sky	Opening montage of Shane going into his apartment.
Track 2	Enzo Villaparades	Ritmo del Sol	Shane finds the Zadofian apartment but hides from Vic and Ronnie.
Track 3	Tech-I-LA featuring Qbanito	Adicted to You	Outside the apartment, Shane hears two gunshots from Ronnie.
Track 4	The New Latin Faction	Hija Cubana	Radio playing at Pezuela's construction site; Vic talks about the blood lines at Kerney street.
Track 5	Stephane Huguenin, Yves Sanna	Pretty Girls	On the radio in the apartment where Corrine and her kids stay.
Track 6	The Dunes	Sunflower Eyes	Emits from Mara' and Shane apartment when Corrine comes to her at night.
Track 7	Standing Shadows	Get Together	Vic & Ronnie meeting Shane at the end of the episode discussing the bloodshed.
Snitch
Track 1	Magic featuring Suga Bear	Ball Like Us	Vic and Shane visit Moses at his crib.
Track 2	504 Boyz, Master P	Wanna Live Like Us	[Instrumental] Strike Team enters the hair salon to make the arrest.
Track 3	Master P featuring Currensy	Let Em Go	Strike Team leaving from Spook Street, while the crowd going crazy.
Money Shot
Track 1	Paul & Price	When The Pushing Starts	Tina Hanlon undercover with at Devin's adult entertainment office.
Genocide
Track 1	Juan Zarate	Aqui Estoy	(Instrumental) Julien finds Rios location, Strike Team are heading to the house of his for the raid.
Game Face
Track 1	Master P	Anything Goes	Julien rushes in with Burnout to the big factory guns withdrawn.
Track 2	Quintaine Americana	Something Went Wrong	Dutch comes into Rita's apartment and confronts his son Lloyd about the assumption of his killings.
Animal Control
Track 1	Porcupine Tree	My Ashes	Shane talking to Mara in the end of the episode.
Bitches Brew
Track 1	?	?	Other rap song playing when Vic and Shane visit escort woman at her apartment.
Track 2	Sean Coleman	What Cha Gone Do	Plays shortly when Julien and Ronnie pass by the apartment building while chasing Two Man.
Track 3	?	?	Another rap song playing shortly after Strike Team gets out of the car to chase Two Man.
Track 4	Shidee Thompson, Charlene Gilliam, Edgard Jaude & Rafael Torres	Hoop Looters	(Instrumental) Strike Team chases Two Man, Ronnie jumps him, Vic taking his money stack.
Parricide
Track 1	Drive-By Truckers	A Blessing and a Curse	Opening titles, Shane preparing his murder plan.
Track 2	TRU	Point 'em Out	Vic Mackey and police arrest Damon Leaks.
Moving Day
Track 1	Chucho Merchan	Finger Snap	Dutch visits Rita and trying gett into Loyd's past life as a teenager.
Party Line
Track 1	Michael Mazochi	Tonight	Ronnie and Vic visit Mara's mother in the middle of the night.
Petty Cash
Track 1	?	?	Song at the lounge when Vic visits Beltran.
Possible Kill Screen
Track 1	Los Lonely Boys	My Way	Shane getting into a fight in the apartment.
Family Meeting
Track 1	X	Los Angeles	Opening credits; Vic driving to meet Ronnie.
Track 2	Robbie Nevil	Livin The Dream	At the store, Shane is buying flowers and pens.
Track 3	Los Rams De La Sierra	En El Baile	At the warehouse, Vic and Ronnie sneak up on Beltran and his protection crew.
Track 4	Concrete Blonde	...Long Time Ago	End credits montage.

Music supervisors	Music editor
Season 7
Ray Espinola Jr., Evyen Klean	Zamp Nicall

== Soundtrack compilation ==
The Shield: Music from the Streets

Soundtrack album by Various Artists
- Released: September 5, 2005
- Genre: Various
- Label: Lakeshore Records

Professional ratings
Review scores
Source	Rating
Allmusic	link
Empire Movies	link

As of 2012, one official soundtrack compilation had been released. The Shield: Music from the Streets was released in 2005, and contains selections from the first four seasons. Unofficial soundtracks on the Internet compiled by fans include tracks featured in episodes that were not included on the official soundtrack.

== Track listing ==
1. "The Shield Theme" – Vivian Ann Romero, Ernesto J. Bautista & Rodney Alejandro
2. "Hating Hollywood" – Theory of a Deadman
3. "Death March" – Black Label Society
4. "Bring Em Out Dead" – Onyx
5. "Lay Down" – Mikal Raymo
6. "Perkins" – Peyote Asesino
7. "Caught Up in the System" – SX-10
8. "Freedom Band" – Delinquent Habits
9. "Pride" – Damageplan
10. "Nothing's Clear" – Ill Niño
11. "Rushing In" – Crazy Anglos
12. "No Muerdas La Mano" – Kinto Sol
13. "Breakdown" – Tantric
14. "Betrayal" – The Black Maria
15. "Let's Ride" – Conejo
16. "Ooohhhwee" – Master P
17. "Mafia" – Kelis featuring Markita
18. "Cuiden A Los Niños" – Brujeria
19. "The Shield" (X-Ecutioners Remix) – The X-Ecutioners
