= Ground Xero =

Studio album by Ill Insanity
- Released: February 11, 2008
- Recorded: 2007–2008
- Genre: Hip hop, turntablism
- Label: Ablist Productions
- Producer: Rob Swift, Total Eclipse, DJ Precision, Roc Raida, DJ Q-Bert

Ill Insanity chronology
General Patton vs. The X-Ecutioners (2005)	Ground Xero (2008)

Ground Xero is the first studio album by the American DJ group Ill Insanity, which consists of three members of the New York City DJ group The X-Ecutioners, Rob Swift, Total Eclipse and DJ Precision. It was released on February 11, 2008, by Ablist Productions and was produced by Swift, Total Eclipse and DJ Precision, with additional production by Roc Raida of The X-Ecutioners and DJ Q-Bert.

Writing for PopMatters, Dominic Umile described the album as "a throwback, a tribute to the prime of turntablism’s marriage of old soul breaks, persistent sampling, and cuts as a mystifying phenomenon."

== Track listing ==
1. "Halftime Intro"
2. "The Prelude"
3. "P Bounce"
4. "5 Fingers of Death" (featuring DJ Q-Bert)
5. "Nonverbal Communication"
6. "Break Ill"
7. "Scratch Live" (featuring Roc Raida)
8. "Insane Style"
9. "Ill Insanity"
10. "Sound Science"
11. "Soul Train Line"
12. "We Don't Stop"
13. "Decorated Vets"
14. "Halftime Outro"
