= Soulful Fruit =

Studio album by Rob Swift
- Released: May 13, 1997
- Recorded: 1996–1997
- Genre: Turntablism, hip hop
- Length: 51:09
- Label: Stones Throw
- Producer: Rob Swift, Mista Sinista, Roc Raida

Rob Swift chronology
Soulful Fruit (1997)	The Ablist (1999)

Soulful Fruit is the first album by the turntablist Rob Swift. It was released on May 13, 1997, by Stones Throw Records and was produced by Rob Swift, Mista Sinista and Roc Raida. The album was a critical success, gaining many positive reviews.

== Critical reception ==
Professional ratings
Review scores
Source	Rating
AllMusic	4.5/5 stars

CMJ New Music Monthly concluded that "this is hip-hop in its purest form, and it succeeds in advancing instrumental music to the next level."

== Track listing ==
1. "Define Music" - 1:24
2. "Introduction" - 0:54
3. "Itchy Vibes and Drums" - 2:07
4. "Cutting with Class" - 2:17
5. "Interlude 1: Babu Speaks" feat. Babu - 1:15
6. "The Mad Scientist of the Turntables" - 1:49
7. "Relax Mode" - 4:08
8. "This Is a Remix" - 2:00
9. "Interlude 2: Bruce Lee Speaks" feat. Bruce Lee - 1:23
10. "Some Ol' Rough Shit" - 1:46
11. "A Natural High" - 2:31
12. "A Scratch Is a Musical Note" - 4:05
13. "Diamond Jay Will Spin It" - 5:06
14. "Rob Swift Versus Rahzel" feat. Rahzel - 14:16
15. "A Turntable Experience" - 4:20
16. "Interlude 3: Message" - 3:18
17. "Women and Stress" - 1:28
18. "Women and Stress 2" - 1:28
19. "Let the Drummer Get Some" - 1:00
20. "Interlude 4: Bruce Lee Speaks Again" - 0:51
21. "Who Is It? Mista Sinista" - 3:28
