= Japan X-Clusive =

1998 compilation album by the X-Ecutioners

Compilation album by The X-Ecutioners
- Released: June 10, 1998
- Recorded: 1996
- Genres: Hip-hop; Underground rap
- Label: P-Vine Records
- Producers: Rob Swift; Total Eclipse; Roc Raida; Mista Sinista

The X-Ecutioners chronology
Música Negra (Black Music)/Wordplay (1997)	Japan X-Clusive (1998)	Built from Scratch (2002)

Japan X-Clusive is the first compilation album by New York City DJ group The X-Ecutioners. It was originally released in 1998 and, like the title said, was exclusive in Japan. The album featured songs by several Japanese rap artists, such as Naked Artz and King Giddra, along with production by The X-Ecutioners.

== Track listing ==
1. "Ginga Tankenki" (Remix) (Rhymehead)
2. "Michi Naru Tane" (Naked Artz featuring Rhymester)
3. "For Da Bad Boys and Ladies" (Illmariachi featuring Ikooru)
4. "Kyotou 98" (Naked Artz featuring Rappagariya)
5. "Specialist" (Real Styla)
6. "X-Hibition 1" (The X-Ecutioners & Naked Artz)
7. "Kagi" (Naked Artz)
8. "Real Styla" (Real Styla)
9. "X-Hibition 2" (The X-Ecutioners)
10. "Outtakes 1" (The X-Ecutioners)
11. "X-Hibition 3" (The X-Ecutioners)
12. "Raida's Theme" (The X-Ecutioners)
13. "X-Hibition 4" (The X-Ecutioners)
14. "I and I" (Mr Drunk remix) (Naked Artz)
15. "Yabasugiru Skill part II" (Rappagariya featuring Skip)
16. "Oosouji" (King Giddra)
17. "Mimawasou" (King Giddra)
18. "Kotoba No Kagaku" (Rappagariya)
19. "X-Hibition 5" (The X-Ecutioners)
20. "Outtakes 2" (The X-Ecutioners, King Giddra, & Mimawasou)
