= General Patton vs. The X-Ecutioners =

2005 studio album by Mike Patton & the X-Ecutioners

Studio album by Mike Patton & The X-Ecutioners
- Released: February 25, 2005
- Genre: Experimental hip hop
- Length: 46:41
- Label: Ipecac Recordings (IPC60)
- Producer: Mike Patton

Mike Patton & The X-Ecutioners chronology
| Revolutions (2004) | General Patton vs. The X-Ecutioners (2005) | Ground Xero (2008) |

Professional ratings
Review scores
| Source | Rating |
|---|---|
| Allmusic | 3.5/5 stars |
| Stylus Magazine | 3/5 stars |

General Patton vs. The X-Ecutioners is a collaboration album released by Mike Patton and New York City's hip-hop DJ trio The X-Ecutioners. It was released on February 5, 2005 through Ipecac Recordings, and was entirely produced by Mike Patton.

== Production ==
The album was produced over a course of two years. The X-Ecutioners built the album's basic tracks around samples from albums and films suggested by Mike Patton, who finalized the album.

== Style ==
The album's musical style draws from free jazz and glitch. It is themed around a war between the two vastly different musical styles. The album contains various samples from uncredited films, including kung fu movies and Dirty Harry. One of the larger samples includes dialogue from actors John Hillerman and Dennis Olivieri, taken from the film The Naked Ape.

== Track listing ==
| No. | Title | Length |
|---|---|---|
| 1. | "X-Men Doctrine and Declaration: Target=40:40:11N 73:56:38W" | 1:30 |
| 2. | "General P. Counterintelligence: Target=37:47:36N 122:33:17W" | 0:40 |
| 3. | "¡Get Up, Punk! 0200 Hrs. (Joint Special Operations Task Force)" | 3:38 |
| 4. | "Roc Raida: Riot Control Agent / Combat Stress Control" | 2:05 |
| 5. | "Improvised Explosive Device 0300 Hrs." | 0:36 |
| 6. | "¡Vaqueros y Indios! (Joint Special Operations Task Force)" | 1:52 |
| 7. | "Precision Guided Needle-Dropping and Larynx Munitions (PGNDLM)" | 1:55 |
| 8. | "Duelling Banjo Marching Drill" | 1:54 |
| 9. | "Battle Hymn of the Technics Republic" | 1:11 |
| 10. | "¡Fire in the Hole! 0400 Hrs. (Joint Special Operations Task Force)" | 2:14 |
| 11. | "Convulsive Antidote for Nerve Agent Autoinjector (CANAA)" | 0:43 |
| 12. | "Modified Combined Obstacle Overlay (MCOO) …or... "How I Learned to Stop Worrying and Love the Turntables"" | 2:41 |
| 13. | "Surprise Swing Insurgency / Tabla and Tongue Twist Counterattack / "Dragon Seeks Path"" | 3:41 |
| 14. | "¡Kamikaze! 0500 Hrs. ("Take a Piece of Me")" | 2:16 |
| 15. | ""We'll Paint This Town" -- Throat and Phonograph Fire Support Coordination Measures (TPFSCM)" | 1:40 |
| 16. | "Imitative Electromagnetic Deception (IED) / Digital Nonsecure Voice Terminal (DNVT)" | 0:21 |
| 17. | "A.W.O.L. Block Party Brawl 0600 Hrs." | 1:50 |
| 18. | "Eastside Multichannel Tactical Scratch Communications (EMTSC)" | 1:41 |
| 19. | "¡Pimps Up, Aces High! 0700 Hrs. (Westside Swashbuckling Parade)" | 1:28 |
| 20. | "Warcry / Infrared R'n'B Hallucination / Jungle Operations Exfiltration System" | 3:02 |
| 21. | "L.O.L. - ¡Loser on Line! (Hate the Player, Hate the Game)" | 3:34 |
| 22. | "Low Altitude Vocal Parachute Extraction System (LAVPES)" | 1:04 |
| 23. | "Battle Damage Assessment and Repair / White Flag Surrender / "Wake Me Up in Heaven"" | 4:52 |
| Total length: | | 46:41 |

All lyrics by Mike Patton, published by Mal di Golda (ASCAP).
Produced, arranged and mixed at Vulcan Studios, San Francisco, California.
Mastered at Oasis Mastering, Los Angeles, California.

== Personnel ==
- Mike Patton – vocals, keyboard, guitar, bass, percussion; editing and programming, production, arrangement, mixing, artwork
- Rob Swift – turntables
- Roc Raida – turntables
- Total Eclipse – turntables
- Gene Grimaldi – mastering
- Martin Kvamme – artwork
