= Airwave Invasion =

Compilation album by Rob Swift
- Released: June 8, 2001
- Recorded: 2001
- Genre: Turntablism; Underground rap
- Label: Triple Threat Records
- Producer: Rob Swift; Roc Raida; Mista Sinista

Rob Swift chronology
The Ablist (1999)	Airwave Invasion (2001)	Sound Event (2002)

Professional ratings
Review scores
Source	Rating
Allmusic	4/5 stars

Airwave Invasion is a compilation album by the turntablist Rob Swift featuring his X-Ecutioners bandmates, Roc Raida and Mista Sinista. It was released on June 8, 2001, by Triple Threat Records and was produced by the X-Ecutioners. The album combined The X-Ecutioners scratches and productions with classic R&B and jazz songs.

== Track listing ==
No.	Title	Length
1.	"You Are My Starship" (feat. Norman Connors)
2.	"Unhooked Generation" (feat. Freida Payne)
3.	"Singing A Song For My Mother" (feat. Hamilton Bohannon)
4.	"You Roam When You Don't Get It At Home" (feat. Sweet Inspirations)
5.	"Ghetto: Misfortune's Wealth" (feat. 24 Karat Black)
6.	"Future Flavas Set #1" (feat. Pete Rock & Marley Marl)
7.	"Save Their Souls" (feat. Hamilton Bohannon)
8.	"On The Hill" (feat. Oliver Sain)
9.	"Future Flavas Set #2"
10.	"Tramp" (feat. Lowell Fulson)
11.	"Interlude"
12.	"X-ecution Style" (feat. Kool G. Rap & Big Pun)
13.	"WNYU Set" (feat. Mr. Mayhem & DJ Riz)
14.	"The Creator Has A Master Plan" (feat. Norman Connors)
15.	"Interlude"
16.	"Don't It Drive You Crazy" (The Pointer Sisters)
17.	"Holy Thursday" (feat. David Axelrod)
18.	"All That Scratching"
