= Next Up =

Next Up may refer to:

- "Next Up", song by Rob Swift from Back to the Beat (Rob Swift album)
- "Next Up", song by Sunz of Man from The Old Testament (album)
- "Next Up", song by hip hop duo UGK from Underground Kingz
- "Next Up", song by Lil Yachty from Nuthin' 2 Prove
