= Scratchology =

2003 compilation album by the X-Ecutioners

Compilation album by The X-Ecutioners
- Released: April 8, 2003
- Recorded: 2002–03
- Genre: Underground hip hop
- Length: 58:25
- Label: Sequence Records
- Producers: The X-Ecutioners; DJ Premier; DJ Babu; DJ Q-bert

The X-Ecutioners chronology
| Built from Scratch (2002) | Scratchology (2003) | Revolutions (2004) |

Professional ratings
Review scores
| Source | Rating |
|---|---|
| AllMusic | 3/5 stars |

Scratchology is the second compilation album by American hip-hop DJ group The X-Ecutioners. It was released on April 8, 2003 through Sequence Records. The album contained various hip hop tracks that were cut up and produced by The X-Ecutioners.

== History ==
Songs from various artists appear on the album, including Grandmaster Flash, 3rd Bass, Public Enemy, Gang Starr, Dilated Peoples, The Beat Junkies, Marvelous Marvin, DJ Premier, Roc Raida, Rhettmatic, and Davy DMX. Additional producers have included DJ Premier, DJ Babu, DJ Q-bert, MC Serch, Pete Nice, Gary G-Wiz and Pete Rock.

== Track listing ==
| No. | Title | Writer(s) | Length |
|---|---|---|---|
| 1. | "What Is a Scratch?" (Intro) | | 1:55 |
| 2. | "The Adventures of Grandmaster Flash on the Wheels of Steel" | Jiggs Chase, Melvin Glover, George Jackson, Sylvia Robinson | 5:17 |
| 3. | "Military Cut" | Fred Brathwaite | 4:07 |
| 4. | "Rock It" | Michael Beinhorn, Herbie Hancock, Bill Laswell | 5:22 |
| 5. | "Like This (Full & Fresh)" | | 5:11 |
| 6. | "2–3 Break" | Robert Aguilar | 3:59 |
| 7. | "Ugly People Be Quiet" (featuring Marvelous Marvin) | Marvin Berryman, J.C. Hewlett | 4:47 |
| 8. | "Product of the Environment (Remix)" | Michael Berrin, Peter Nash | 5:07 |
| 9. | "One for the Treble" (featuring Davy DMX) | David Reeves | 1:04 |
| 10. | "Shut 'Em Down (Pete Rock Mix)" (featuring Public Enemy) | Chuck D, Cerwin Depper, Gary G-Wiz, Stuart Robertz, Hank Shocklee | 1:30 |
| 11. | "DJ Premier in Deep Concentration" (featuring Gangstarr) | Chris E. Martin | 3:35 |
| 12. | "Interlude" | | 0:32 |
| 13. | "Dilated Junkies" (featuring The Beat Junkies, Dilated Peoples and Rhettmatic) | | 3:40 |
| 14. | "Interlude" | | 0:21 |
| 15. | "Felonious Funk" | | 3:53 |
| 16. | "Premier's X-ecution" (featuring DJ Premier) | Chris E. Martin | 4:11 |
| 17. | "I'll Kick Ya Ass" (featuring Roc Raida) | | 1:55 |
| 18. | "Razorblade Alcohol Slide" | | 1:59 |
| Total length: | | | 54:65 |
