= I Am King (disambiguation) =

I Am King is an album by Code Orange.

I Am King may also refer to:

- I Am King, Sean John fragrance by Sean Combs
- I Am King, American band formerly on Rise Records
- I Am King, mixtape in the Trae tha Truth discography
- "I Am King", song by Forgotten Rebels
- "I Am King", song by Erinn Williams from Music on The Shield
- "I Am King", song by MFGrimm from You Only Live Twice: The Audio Graphic Novel

== See also ==
- Naane Raja (disambiguation), various Indian films so titled
