= Under the influence =

Under the influence may refer to:

- Alcohol intoxication, the behavioral and physical effects caused by alcohol
- Altered state of consciousness, attained through the ingestion of psychoactive drugs
- Driving under the influence, the offense of driving a motor vehicle while impaired by alcohol or other drugs
  - Drunk driving, the act of driving under the influence of alcohol
  - Drug-impaired driving, the act of driving a motor vehicle while under the influence of an impairing substance

== Music ==
=== Albums ===
- Under the Influence (Alan Jackson album), 1999
- Under the Influence (Diesel album), 2011
- Under the Influence (Foghat album) or the title song, 2016
- Under the Influence (Mary Coughlan album), 1987
- Under the Influence (Overkill album), 1988
- Under the Influence (Rob Swift album), 2003
- Under the Influence (Status Quo album) or the title song, 1999
- Under the Influence (Straight No Chaser album), 2013
- Under the Influence (Terra Naomi album), 2007
- Under the Influence (Warrant album), 2001
- Under the Influence (compilation album), a series of British albums
- Under the Influence (mixtape), by Domo Genesis, 2011
- Under the Influence – 21 Years of Flying Nun Records, 2002
- Under the Influence: A Tribute to the Legends of Hard Rock, by Asking Alexandria,
- Under tha Influence, by DJ Quik, 2002
- Under the Influences, by Mike Ness, 1999
- Under the Influence, by the Flyin' Ryan Brothers, 2011
- Under the Influence, by Tony Lucca, 2011

=== Songs ===
- "Under the Influence" (Chris Brown song), 2022
- "Under the Influence" (Elle King song), 2015
- "Under the Influence" (Vanity song), 1986
- "Under the Influence", by the Chemical Brothers from Electronic Battle Weapon 3, 1998
- "Under the Influence", by Citizen King from Mobile Estates, 1999
- "Under the Influence", by Cliff Richard, a B-side of "The Only Way Out", 1982
- "Under the Influence", by Eminem from The Marshall Mathers LP, 2000
- "Under the Influence", by James Morrison from Undiscovered, 2006
- "Under the Influence", by Rusty Cooley, 2003
- "Under the Influence", by Tyler Joe Miller, 2026

== Television and film ==
- "Under the Influence" (CSI: Miami), a 2004 TV episode
- "Under the Influence" (Full House), a 1994 TV episode
- "Under the Influence" (Rising Damp), a 1978 TV episode
- Under the Influence, a 1986 television film starring Andy Griffith
- Under the Influence, a 2002 film featuring Jim Metzler

== Other media ==
- Under the Influence (radio series), a Canadian radio documentary series
- Under the Influence, a 1954 fantasy novel by Geoffrey Kerr

== See also ==
- Under Influence, a 1979 album by Zones
