= Crossfaderz =

Studio album by Roc Raida
- Released: July 11, 2000
- Recorded: 1995–1999
- Genre: Hip hop, turntablism
- Label: Moonshine Music
- Producer: Roc Raida, DJ Q-Bert, D-Styles, The X-Ecutioners

Roc Raida chronology
The Adventures Of Roc Raida ...One Too Many! (1997)	Crossfaderz (2000)	We Them Niggas (2001)

Crossfaderz is the second album by turntablist Roc Raida. It was released on July 11, 2000, for Moonshine Music and featured production from Roc Raida, DJ Q-Bert, D-Styles and The X-Ecutioners.

== Critical reception ==
Professional ratings
Review scores
Source	Rating
Allmusic	4/5 stars

Brad Mills, writing for AllMusic, praised the turntable effects on the album, calling Raida "one of the world's best turntablists". Mills also highlighted the radio-show theme on Crossfaderz. The skit entitled "Lifestyles of the Rich and Dangerous", featuring Big L, references Big L's first album, Lifestylez ov da Poor & Dangerous.

== Track listing ==
1. "Who You Fuckin' Wit?"- 2:07
2. "Keep It Real Airlines"- 1:29
3. "What Car and Limo Service"- :57
4. "The Enemy"- 4:19 (Featuring Diggin' in the Crates Crew)
5. "Visualize"- 2:14 (Featuring Mister Complex)
6. "Conceited Bastard"- 3:03 (Featuring Mad Skillz)
7. "Tried By 12"- 2:52
8. "The Session"- 2:51
9. "Fist of the White Lotus"- 1:03
10. "Caller Trying to Win Tickets"- 1:00
11. "Missing in Action"- 3:33
12. "Raida's Theme"- 3:38 (Featuring WaynO of the E. Bros)
13. "The Heist"- 3:16 (Featuring Big L)
14. "Drop It Heavy"- 4:28 (Featuring Showbiz & AG)
15. "Lifestyles of the Rich and Dangerous"- 2:33
16. "One Man Band"- 3:10
17. "Black Pack Rapper"- 2:02
18. "Slash Ya Face Records"- 1:25
19. "Bitch in Yoo"- 3:52 (Featuring Common)
20. "Find That"- 3:37 (Featuring The Beatnuts)
21. "Getting Closer to God"- 3:34 (Featuring Krumbsnatcha, DJ Premier
22. "MC-2"- 2:59 (Featuring Diamond D)
23. "Razorblade Alcohol Slide"- 3:34 (Featuring DJ Q-Bert, D-Styles)

== Personnel ==
- The Beatnuts – Producer
- Beats Anonymous – Performer
- Big L – Performer
- DJ Spinna – Producer
- DMC – Photo Courtesy
- East Flatbush Project – Performer
- Missin' Linx – Performer
- Roc Raida – Producer, DJ, Mixing
- Pete Rock – Producer
- Show & A.G. – Performer
- Skillz – Performer
- The X-ecutioners – Performer
