= Revolutions (The X-Ecutioners album) =

Studio album by the X-Ecutioners
- Released: June 8, 2004
- Recorded: 2003–04
- Genre: Hip hop; turntablism
- Length: 51:37
- Label: Columbia
- Producer: DJ Total Eclipse; Dr. Butcher; Matt Stein; Rob Swift; Roc Raida; Saffs; Sean C; the Ratt Pakk; Todd Perimutter

The X-Ecutioners chronology
Scratchology (2003)	Revolutions (2004)	General Patton vs. The X-Ecutioners (2005)

Singles from Revolutions
- 1. "Live from the PJs"; 2. "Like This"; 3. "Back to Black"

Revolutions is the third studio album by New York City DJ group the X-Ecutioners. It was released on June 8, 2004, through Columbia Records. The album was produced by members Rob Swift, DJ Total Eclipse and Roc Raida, as well as the Professionals, Matt Stein, Sean C, Dr. Butcher, the Ratt Pakk, and Todd Perimutter. It features guest appearances from Aasim, Anikke, Black Thought, Blue Man Group, B-Real, dead prez, Fat Joe, Ghostface Killah, Josey Scott, Rob Zombie, Roc Marciano, Saigon, Scram Jones, Sly Boogie, Start Trouble, and Trife Diesel. The album peaked at number 118 on the Billboard 200, number 50 on the Top R&B/Hip-Hop Albums and number 24 on the Top Rap Albums in the United States.

Three singles were released "Live from the PJs", "Like This" and "Back to Back". This would mark Rob Swift's last studio album with the group before he left in 2005 to focus on his solo career. "Like This" was also featured in 2003 video game SSX 3. "Let's Go", a collaboration with Good Charlotte, was recorded but was not featured on the album. However, the song appeared in 2004 video game NFL Street.

== Critical reception ==
Professional ratings
Aggregate scores
Source	Rating
Metacritic	63/100
Review scores
Source	Rating
AllMusic	3.5/5 stars
Alternative Press	4/5 stars
Blender	4/5 stars
Entertainment Weekly	B
IGN	7/10
RapReviews	9/10
Rolling Stone	2/5 stars
Spin	B+
Tiny Mix Tapes	1.5/5 marks
URB	3.5/5 stars

Revolutions was met with generally favorable reviews from music critics. At Metacritic, which assigns a normalized rating out of 100 to reviews from mainstream publications, the album received an average score of 63, based on twelve reviews.

Alternative Press called it "solidly entertaining", Splendid — "pretty breathtaking", and Blender critic found that the album "stands on its own, with... an emphasis on beats rather than technical tricks". Neil Drumming in his review for Entertainment Weekly stated: "the X-ecutioners force the ire on their third album, Revolutions, with mixed results". Soren Baker wrote: "these songs are accented by the X-ecutioners' deft scratching and energetic beats, resulting in a regularly exciting and inventive album". AllMusic's David Jeffries resumed: "the just fair pop tracks keep it from being classic, but this is the best the talented team has sounded on record yet".

In mixed reviews, Q said that "the trio's scratching feels peripheral, and when it does take centre stage, is underwhelming". Christian Hoard of Rolling Stone found that "too many forgettable concoctions make this just another so-so DJ mix".

In negative reviews, Nathan Rabin of The A.V. Club wrote that "all too often finds X-Ecutioners playing second fiddle to an outsized roster of uninspired guests". Tiny Mix Tapes saw it as "an extremely boring affair, never building any momentum from the start to finish".

== Track listing ==
No.	Title	Writer(s)	Producer(s)	Length
1.	"Skit 1"			1:58
2.	"The Countdown, Pt. 2" (featuring Blue Man Group)	Robert Aguilar; Anthony Saffery; Todd Perimutter; Darryl Mason; James Whipper; Kevin Strong; Robin Strong; Rubin Garcia; Theodore Livingston	The Professionals; Todd Perimutter	1:45
3.	"Live from the PJs" (featuring Ghostface Killah, Trife and Black Thought)	Dennis Coles; Theodore Bailey; Tariq Trotter; Anthony Williams; Odetta Holmes; Ronald LaPread	Roc Raida	2:53
4.	"Like This" (featuring Anikke)	Aguilar; Saffery; Mason; Whipper; K. Strong; R. Strong; Garcia; Livingston	The Professionals	3:23
5.	"C'mon"	Keith Bailey; Matt Stein	DJ Total Eclipse; Matt Stein	2:51
6.	"Skit 2"			2:05
7.	"Back to Back" (featuring Saigon and Scram Jones)	Brian Carenard; Marc Shemer; Williams	Roc Raida	3:08
8.	"Let Me Rock" (featuring Start Trouble)	Luke Walker; Aguilar; Saffery; Andrew Venable	The Professionals; Dr. Butcher	3:26
9.	"The Regulators" (featuring Roc Marciano and Sly Boogy)	Rakeem Meyer; Timothy Martin; Williams	Roc Raida	3:15
10.	"Space Invader"	Aguilar; Saffery	The Professionals	3:36
11.	"Old School Throwdown"	Williams; Deleno Matthews	Sean C	2:36
12.	"Get With It" (featuring B-Real)	Louis Freese; Aguilar; Saffery	The Professionals	3:29
13.	"(Even) More Human than Human" (featuring Rob Zombie, Slug and Josey Scott)	Robert Cummings; Jay Noel Yuenger; Shauna Reynolds; Sean Daley	DJ Total Eclipse; Matt Stein	3:58
14.	"Skit 3"			1:16
15.	"Sucka Think He Cud Wup Me" (featuring dead prez)	Clayton Gavin; Lavonne Alford; Aguilar; Williams; Bailey; André Brown; Eric McIntosh; Hiro Oshima; Tyrone Kelsie	The Ratt Pakk	3:40
16.	"The Truth" (featuring Fat Joe and Aasim)	Joseph Cartagena; Leroy Watson; Williams; Matthews	Sean C	3:40
17.	"Ill Bill"	Bailey; Stein	DJ Total Eclipse; Matt Stein	3:59
18.	"Skit 4"			0:39
Total length:				51:37

== Charts ==
Chart (2004)	Peak position
US Billboard 200	118
US Top R&B/Hip-Hop Albums (Billboard)	50
US Top Rap Albums (Billboard)	24
