= Naane Raja =

Naane Raja (lit. 'I Am King') may refer to these Indian films:

- Naane Raja (1956 film), a Tamil film directed by A. Bhim Singh and starring Sivaji Ganesan and M. N. Rajam
- Naane Raja (1984 film), a Kannada film directed by C. V. Rajendran and starring V. Ravichandran and Ambika

== See also ==
- I Am King (disambiguation)
