= The Ablist =

Studio album by Rob Swift
- Released: February 23, 1999
- Recorded: 1998–1999
- Genre: Turntablism, underground rap
- Label: Asphodel
- Producer: Rob Swift, Dan the Automator

Rob Swift chronology
Soulful Fruit (1997)	The Ablist (1999)	Airwave Invasion (2001)

The Ablist is the second album by the turntablist Rob Swift, released in 1999 via Asphodel Records. The album was produced by Rob Swift and Dan The Automator. The rapper Pharoahe Monch makes an appearance.

== Critical reception ==
Professional ratings
Review scores
Source	Rating
AllMusic	4/5 stars
The Austin Chronicle	3.5/4 stars
The Encyclopedia of Popular Music	4/5 stars

AllMusic wrote that the album "redefines the turntable as a musical instrument that can bring new dimensions to both structured and improvised music, and it shows that Swift is capable of some incisive music that works outside the normal confines of turntablist music." The Riverfront Times thought that "it never really breaks away from standard hip-hop and therefore never fulfills its promise as something totally new." Vibe opined that "the only time the album lags is when Swift steps to the mike on 'I'm Leaving'."

== Track listing ==
1. "Day One" - 0:30
2. "Dope on Plastic" - 2:09
3. "What Would You Do?" - 2:12
4. "Night Time" - 2:40
5. "Modern Day Music" - 3:53
6. "Two Turntables and a Keyboard" - 0:15
7. "Fusion Beats" - 3:47
8. "Alma's Message" - 0:14
9. "Turntablist Anthem" feat. Pharoahe Monch - 4:01
10. "Let's Talk Relationships" - 0:13
11. "I'm Leaving" - 2:33
12. "Brainstorming" - 1:09
13. "All That Scratching Is Making Me Rich!" - 5:15
14. "Ben Fee the MC" - 0:08
15. "Musica Negra/Black Music (Remix) - 5:00
16. "Gangis Kahn" - 3:49
17. "This Is Our Day" feat. Dan the Automator - 3:57
18. "The Will to Do Something Different" - 0:11
19. "Something Different" - 3:58
20. "Gangis Kahn Returns" - 0:11
21. "The Ablist" - 2:13
