= OuMuPo 2 =

Studio album by Rob Swift
- Released: October 19, 2004
- Recorded: 2004
- Genre: Turntablism; Underground rap
- Label: Ici, d'ailleurs... Records
- Producer: Rob Swift

Rob Swift chronology
| Who Sampled This? (2003) | OuMuPo 2 (2004) | War Games (2005) |

Professional ratings
Review scores
| Source | Rating |
|---|---|
| Allmusic | 3.5/5 stars |

OuMuPo 2 is the seventh album by the turntablist, Rob Swift. It was released on October 19, 2004, by the independent French record label Ici, d'ailleurs.... It was produced by Rob Swift.

== Track listing ==
| No. | Title | Length |
|---|---|---|
| 1. | "Trou Noir" | 3:53 |
| 2. | "Annex 6" | 5:41 |
| 3. | "Am All Wrong?" | 2:55 |
| 4. | "1" | 8:36 |
| 5. | "Infini V88" | 3:53 |
| 6. | "Magree" | 2:03 |
| 7. | "It Ain't No Funny At All" | 2:56 |
| 8. | "Une Pluie Sèche" | 6:51 |
| 9. | "Countryside" | 5:18 |
