= X-Pressions =

Studio album by the X-Ecutioners
- Released: 1997
- Recorded: 1997
- Genres: Hip-hop, turntablism
- Length: 62:38
- Label: Asphodel
- Producers: Rob Swift, Total Eclipse, Roc Raida, Mista Sinista

The X-Ecutioners chronology
X-Pressions (1997)	Built from Scratch (2002)

Singles from X-Pressions
- 1. "Música Negra (Black Music)/Wordplay" Released: October 21, 1997; 2. "Raida's Theme" Released: February 10, 1998

X-Pressions is the debut studio album by New York City turntablist band the X-Ecutioners, the first of its kind, according to Rolling Stone. The album was released in 1997 for Asphodel Records and was produced by four members of the X-Ecutioners, including Rob Swift, Total Eclipse, Roc Raida, and Mista Sinista.

== History ==
Though the album was not a commercial success, it did gain many positive reviews and today is considered to be somewhat of a classic. "Música Negra (Black Music)/Wordplay" and "Raida's Theme" (as a remix CD single) were released as singles. However, along with the album, they did not chart.

== Critical reception ==
Professional ratings
Review scores
Source	Rating
AllMusic	3.5/5 stars
Select	2/5 stars

The New York Times noted that "the scratch-crazy debut album by the X-ecutioners ... adds an extra dose of old-school rap: boasting."

== Track listing ==
No.	Title	Length
1.	"X-Outtakes 1"	0:18
2.	"Get Started"	3:09
3.	"Word Play"	2:40
4.	"X-Outtakes 2"	0:23
5.	"Raida's Theme" (featuring E Bros)	3:29
6.	"Pianos from Hell"	3:08
7.	"The Cipher" (featuring Creature, Gudtyme, Kukoo da baga bonez, Pliz & World)	4:00
8.	"The Turntablist Anthem" (featuring Anikke & Taboo)	3:48
9.	"X-Outtakes 3"	0:49
10.	"One Man Band"	3:03
11.	"The Countdown"	6:34
12.	"Solve for X"	2:27
13.	"X-Outtakes 4"	0:24
14.	"Turntable Exhibition"	2:46
15.	"Beat Treats"	3:13
16.	"Musical Intuition" (featuring Anikke & Gudtyme)	5:07
17.	"Mad Flava"	4:34
18.	"X-Outtakes 5"	1:08
19.	"Poetry in Motion" (featuring Halex the Armageddon)	3:48
20.	"Scratch to This"	0:45
21.	"Musica Negra (Black Music)" (featuring Gudtyme)	4:32
22.	"Table Talk" (featuring The 5th Platoon)	2:33
Total length:		62:38
