= Bobby Rivas =

Salvadoran musician

Bobby Rivas is a Salvadoran salsa/balladeer singer, composer, actor and musician. His band performs salsa and Latin music in general at his group's concerts.

Born in El Salvador, the son of a Nicaraguan father and a Salvadorean mother, Rivas began singing at age six in school shows, church choirs, benefits, weddings..

At age eleven, Rivas participated in the "Buscando Estrellas" festival, from which he emerged a finalist. At thirteen, he joined the Chucho Tovar Flores orchestra, relocating to Los Angeles, California.

In 1977 Rivas joined the "LA Compañia" orchestra, where he was introduced to the Tropical Music scene. In 1980, the promoter Roberto Rivera invited Rivas to form his own group. Rivas began to perform at the Hollywood Palladium, opening for headliners such as El Gran Combo, Ruben Blades, Willie Colon, Machito, and Celia Cruz, and others.

Rivas then joined with Alex Acuña, Luis Conte, Yari More, Justo Almario and others, to form "The Los Angeles Salsa All Stars," a twenty piece band that performed in Tuesday night descargas at the Peruvian Room.

In 1986, Rivas took first prize in the OTI Festival in Los Angeles. He accepted invitations to sing in the song festivals, such as The Curaçao Song Festival, Holland Casino Sheveningeng, Colombia Festibuga, Peru Ancon Festival, and New Yorks' "Festival Latino de la Cancion".

Between festivals and concerts, Rvuas sang and produced music for television and films and commercials with producers such as Bebu Silvetti, Jorge Calandrelli, Hector Garrido, Harry Manfrediny, Emilio Kauderer, Cesar Benitez, Sandy Stein, Ramon Flores, Gustavo Farias, Kenny Obrien, Jesus Alejandro Perez "El Niño".

Rivas He appeared in "Las Palmas De Oro" in Mexico City, acting in the movie "Pesadilla En Las Vegas," and in "L.A. Confidential." Riva's voice is the voice of Sebastian in the Spanish version of "The Little Mermaid." His music is also featured in "The Shield FX."

Rivas has also appeared on stage with musicians such as Diego Verdaguer, Celia Cruz, Dyango, Braulio, Lucho Gatica, Antonio Prieto, Olga Guillot, Daniel Santos, Bobby Capo, Anacani, Marisela, Trigo Limpio, Angela Carrasco, Lupita Ferrer, Tierra, War and others.
