= War Games (Rob Swift album) =

Studio album by Rob Swift
- Released: September 6, 2005
- Genre: Turntablism
- Length: 41:32
- Label: Coup de Grace
- Producer: Rob Swift

Rob Swift chronology
| OuMuPo 2 (2004) | War Games (2005) | Back to the Beat (2006) |

War Games (sometimes stylized as Wargames) is a 2005 studio album by American turntablist Rob Swift. It was released on Coup de Grace.

== Reception ==
Professional ratings
Review scores
| Source | Rating |
|---|---|
| AllMusic | 4/5 stars |
| Exclaim! | favorable |
| Pitchfork | 5.0/10 |
| XLR8R | favorable |

Marisa Brown of AllMusic described it as "an ominous soundtrack to the DJ's perspective on the state of the contemporary world". She said, "It's complex, intelligent, and provocative, and it's certainly worth listening to."

== Track listing ==
| No. | Title | Length |
|---|---|---|
| 1. | "Intro" | 2:04 |
| 2. | "The Mad Bombers" | 0:38 |
| 3. | "A Terror Wrist" (featuring DJ Melo D) | 4:11 |
| 4. | "The President Is Speaking" | 1:20 |
| 5. | "Terrorism" (featuring DJ Quest and Bob James) | 3:20 |
| 6. | "America's Past Time" | 0:22 |
| 7. | "Another Friendly Game of Baseball...Xtra Innings" (featuring Large Professor) | 3:17 |
| 8. | "41 Bullets" | 0:38 |
| 9. | "Dream" (featuring Breez Evahflowin) | 4:51 |
| 10. | "Military Scratch" (featuring Ricci Rucker and Toadstyle) | 4:12 |
| 11. | "A Ghetto Poem" (featuring Anthony Saffery and Dave McMurray) | 4:49 |
| 12. | "Piano for Condoleezza" | 1:11 |
| 13. | "The Holy Trinity" (featuring Akinyele and Printz Haze) | 4:10 |
| 14. | "A Nation with a Mission" | 0:39 |
| 15. | "Vietnam?" | 3:29 |
| 16. | "Outro" | 2:21 |
