= Sound Event =

Studio album by Rob Swift
- Released: October 2, 2002
- Studio: The Ablist Recordings
- Genre: Hip hop; turntablism
- Length: 40:30
- Label: Tableturns
- Producer: Rob Swift; Dr. Butcher; Large Professor; Kenny Muhammad the Human Orchestra

Rob Swift chronology
Airwave Invasion (2001)	Sound Event (2002)	Under the Influence (2003)

Singles from Sound Event
- 1. "Interview with Colored Man" Released: 2002; 2. "Sub Level" Released: 2003

Sound Event is a 2002 studio album by American turntablist Rob Swift. It was released on Tableturns.

== Critical reception ==
Professional ratings
Review scores
Source	Rating
AllMusic	3.5/5 stars
The A.V. Club	favorable
Pitchfork	8.3/10
Vibe	4/5 stars

Tom Semioli of AllMusic gave the album 3.5 out of 5 stars, calling it "an explosive and intelligent collection of wicked scratching, in-the-pocket beats, startling imagery, and whiz-kid wordplay." Sam Chennault of Pitchfork gave the album an 8.3 out of 10, saying, "The genius of this album is not only Rob Swift's skill, but also the restraint he shows in displaying his considerable talent."

Laura Checkoway of Vibe said, "Instead of overwhelming listeners with robotic DJ overload, Sound Event artfully combines technical dexterity with simple rap lyrics, live instrumentals, and politically charged sound bites."

== Track listing ==
No.	Title	Producer(s)	Length
1.	"A Supernatural Intro" (featuring Supernatural)	Rob Swift	1:42
2.	"2 3 Break" (featuring DJ Klever and DJ Melo-D)	Dr. Butcher	3:46
3.	"The Great Caper" (featuring Dujeous?)	Rob Swift; Dr. Butcher (co.)	3:39
4.	"Hip Hop on Wax" (featuring Large Professor and DJ Radar)	Rob Swift; Large Professor (co.)	3:02
5.	"Salsa Scratch" (featuring Bob James and D-Styles)	Rob Swift	4:09
6.	"Ghetto Interlude"	Rob Swift	0:23
7.	"The Ghetto"	Rob Swift	3:11
8.	"Sub Level" (featuring J-Live)	Rob Swift	3:37
9.	"The Program" (featuring Gudtyme, Eddeganz, and DJ Quest)	Rob Swift	3:16
10.	"Tronic" (featuring Kenny Muhammad the Human Orchestra)	Kenny Muhammad the Human Orchestra; Rob Swift (co.)	3:24
11.	"Interview with Colored Man" (featuring Supernatural and DJ Radar)	Rob Swift	3:42
12.	"Trunk of Funk"	Rob Swift	3:18
13.	"Sound Event"	Rob Swift	2:47
Total length:			40:30
