= Under the Influence (Rob Swift album) =

Remix album by Rob Swift
- Released: April 1, 2003
- Recorded: 2003
- Genre: Turntablism; Underground rap
- Label: Six Degrees Records
- Producer: Rob Swift; Dr. Butcher

Rob Swift chronology
Sound Event (2002)	Under the Influence (2003)	Who Sampled This? (2003)

Professional ratings
Review scores
Source	Rating
Allmusic	4/5 stars

Under the Influence is the fifth album by the turntablist, Rob Swift. It was released on April 1, 2003, by Six Degrees Records and was produced by Rob Swift and Dr. Butcher. The album consists of remixes to songs by other artists like DJ Quik, Marley Marl and Davy DMX.

== Track listing ==
No.	Title	Length
1.	"There's a Storm in the Gulf"	0:34
2.	"Hip Drop"	2:31
3.	"Humpty Bump"	1:24
4.	"Can I Be Your Main Squeeze"	0:49
5.	"Love Is Good"	0:34
6.	"Soul Power"	0:24
7.	"Mercy D"	2:53
8.	"The Hook and Sling"	3:54
9.	"One for the Treble"	5:44
10.	"We're Gonna Need a Little Scratch" (Fresh, Wild, Fly and Bold)	4:08
11.	"The Man Marley Marl"	5:12
12.	"Scratch Attack 2"	5:33
13.	"2, 3 Break"	3:52
14.	"Lenu" (Sounds of Summer)	5:38
15.	"Rezos"	2:07
