= Built from Scratch =

Studio album by the X-Ecutioners
- Released: February 26, 2002
- Recorded: 1999–2001
- Genres: Hip hop; rap rock
- Length: 68:02
- Labels: Loud Records; Columbia
- Producers: Sean Cane; the X-Ecutioners; Beat Junkies; Chris Frantz; CJ Moore; Dan the Automator; DJ Apollo; DJ Premier; Kenny Muhammad the Human Orchestra; Knobody; Large Professor; Lo-Fidelity Allstars; Mike Shinoda; Tina Weymouth

The X-Ecutioners chronology
X-Pressions (1997)	Built from Scratch (2002)	Scratchology (2003)

Singles from Built from Scratch
- 1. "It's Goin' Down" Released: March 2002

Built from Scratch is the second studio album by New York City DJ group the X-Ecutioners. It was released on February 26, 2002, through Loud Records and Columbia Records. The album was produced by Beat Junkies, Chris Frantz, CJ Moore, Dan the Automator, DJ Apollo, DJ Premier, Kenny Muhammad the Human Orchestra, Knobody, Large Professor, Lo-Fidelity Allstars, Mike Shinoda of American rock band Linkin Park, Sean Cane, the X-Ecutioners, and Tina Weymouth, and was executive produced by Peter Kang.

== History ==
The record only spawned one hit single from the album, entitled "It's Goin' Down", which was released in March 2002. The single was heavily written, produced, and performed by Linkin Park members Shinoda and Hahn. They both appear in the official music video along with other Linkin Park members, including Rob Bourdon and Dave "Phoenix" Farrell on drums and bass respectively, with Wayne Static from American rock band Static-X on the guitars. However, Bourdon and Phoenix of Linkin Park, and Static of Static-X were all not involved with the recording session for the single in the studio.

The main album cover is based on Public Enemy's first album, Yo! Bum Rush the Show; an alternative cover simply shows the DJ group's logo and album title on a scratched orange surface (similar as the "It's Goin' Down" single cover).

== Critical reception ==
Professional ratings
Aggregate scores
Source	Rating
Metacritic	62/100
Review scores
Source	Rating
AllMusic	3/5 stars
Alternative Press	3/5 stars
E!	B
Entertainment Weekly	A−
Dotmusic	3.5/5 stars
HipHopDX	4.5/5
RapReviews	8.5/10
Resident Advisor	4.5/5
Rolling Stone	2.5/5 stars

In a reviewing article for Resident Advisor, it describes the X-Ecutioners as a "four-man DJ battle group as a team that consists of Rob Swift, Mista Sinista, Total Eclipse and Roc Raida coming out with a new album, Built from Scratch, to take the music genre of turntablism from an underground phenomenon to a more accessible sound. The record is more than a P.Diddy record, as it is a straight up hip-hop record of 2002 using the techniques being more built up from the days when Grandmaster Flash had his own adventure behind the wheel."

"No hip-hop record is complete nowadays without the usual intro," as described from the article via Resident Advisor, "and ever since producer Prince Paul (formerly De La) brought them out the Skit. A lot of albums really have skits that are wack and get way too played out. However, The X-Ecutioners pulled off decent skits and incorporated a lot of scratching routines into 'em, as well as being quite funny."

"The album isn't just about skits," continuously being described from Resident Advisor, "but all about the hip-hop music and turntablism, and proper tracks that have all been done quite well. All the skits and the songs appear on this album as listed in the record."

== Track listing ==
No.	Title	Writer(s)	Producer(s)	Length
1.	"Intro" (featuring DJ Apollo, DJ Shortkut & DJ Vinroc)		DJ Apollo	1:12
2.	"XL" (featuring Large Professor)	R. Aguilar	Large Professor	2:39
3.	"X-ecutioners Scratch"	R. Aguilar; A. Williams; J.J. Wright	Dr. Butcher; Rob Swift	3:38
4.	"A Journey Into Sound" (featuring Kenny Muhammad The Human Orchestra)	R. Aguilar; A. Williams; J.J. Wright	Kenny Muhammad The Human Orchestra; The X-Ecutioners	4:32
5.	"Hip-Hop Awards" (skit)			2:50
6.	"3 Boroughs"	R. Aguilar; A. Williams; J.J. Wright; J.T. Smith	Rob Swift	1:24
7.	"Let It Bang" (featuring M.O.P.)	R. Aguilar; A. Williams; J.J. Wright; A. Johnson; K. Muchita	Knobody; Roc Raida	3:30
8.	"X-ecutioners (Theme) Song" (featuring Dan the Automator)	R. Aguilar; D. Nakamura	Dan the Automator	3:19
9.	"Feel the Bass"	R. Aguilar; A. Williams; J.J. Wright	Roc Raida	3:56
10.	"You Can't Scratch" (skit)			1:22
11.	"It's Goin' Down" (featuring Mike Shinoda & Mr. Hahn of Linkin Park)	R. Aguilar; A. Williams; A. Joiner; J. Hahn; K. Bailey; M. Jones; M. Shinoda	Mike Shinoda	4:09
12.	"Premier's X-ecution"	R. Aguilar; A. Williams; J.J. Wright; A. Johnson; K. Muchita; C. Martin	DJ Premier	4:42
13.	"The X (Y'all Know the Name)" (featuring Pharoahe Monch, Xzibit, Inspectah Deck & Skillz)	R. Aguilar; A. Williams; J.J. Wright; J.K. Hunter	Dr. Butcher; Rob Swift	3:40
14.	"Genius of Love 2002" (featuring Tom Tom Club & Biz Markie)	A. Williams; C. Frantz; M. Hall; R. Belew; S. Stanley; T. Weymouth	Chris Frantz; Roc Raida; Tina Weymouth	3:56
15.	"Choppin' Niggas Up"	R. Aguilar; A. Williams; J.J. Wright	Roc Raida	2:26
16.	"B-Boy Punk Rock 2001" (featuring Everlast)	A. Williams	Roc Raida	2:29
17.	"Who Wants to Be a Motherfuckin' Millionaire" (skit)			2:48
18.	"Play That Beat"	I. Freeman III	CJ Moore; Dr. Butcher	4:47
19.	"Dramacyde" (featuring Big Pun & Kool G Rap)	R. Aguilar; A. Williams; J.J. Wright; N. Wilson	Sean Cane	3:37
20.	"X-ecution of a Bum Rush" (featuring Beat Junkies)	R. Aguilar; A. Williams; J.J. Wright; J. Jackson	Beat Junkies	2:58
21.	"Play That Beat" (Lo-Fidelity Allstars Remix) (Bonus Track)	I. Freeman III	Lo-Fidelity Allstars	4:23
Total length:				1:08:02

Notes

- "Play That Beat" features uncredited rap vocals from Fatman Scoop

== Charts ==
=== Weekly charts ===
Weekly chart performance for Built from Scratch
Chart (2002)	Peak position
Australian Albums (ARIA)	62
French Albums (SNEP)	121
US Billboard 200	15
US Top R&B/Hip-Hop Albums (Billboard)	13

=== Year-end charts ===
2002 year-end chart performance for Built from Scratch
Chart (2002)	Position
Canadian R&B Albums (Nielsen SoundScan)	150
Canadian Rap Albums (Nielsen SoundScan)	76
