= Jesús Alejandro Pérez =

Jesús Alejandro "El Niño"
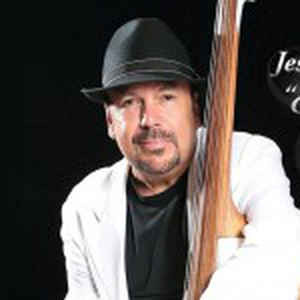
- A picture of him.

Background information
- Born: Jesús Alejandro Pérez; Havana
- Origin: New Orleans and Miami
- Genres: Salsa
- Instruments: piano, flute, tres, percussion
- Member of: Ricardo Lemvo's Makina Loca
- Music streaming: Deezer: https://www.deezer.com/hu/artist/1070664 Spotify: https://open.spotify.com/artist/2xdqwinbPe0RIA3WPomuEm

Jesús Alejandro Pérez (nicknamed Niño Jesús, "Baby Jesus") is a Cuban-Canadian multi-instrumentalist and bandleader based in Montreal and Los Angeles. He is a member of Ricardo Lemvo's Makina Loca, a salsa band that combines Cuban and Angolan music styles.

Born in Havana, Jesús emigrated to the United States at a young age, living in New Orleans and Miami and earning the nickname of "El Niño" (The Kid) as he was usually the youngest member in every band he played. During the 1980s, his work with Los Angeles–based Orquesta Versalles (featuring composer and pianist La Palabra), was popular with dancers and cemented Pérez's credentials as a bandleader.

Since 1997, Pérez resides in Montreal; his knowledge of Cuban music has made him one of the hubs of the Canadian salsa scene. His arrangements tend toward the traditional sound of charanga, son and rumba, and less to the standard sounds of post-1980s salsa. He publishes his records through the LMS Records label. In collaboration with The Daniel Indart Project and Lucho Campillo with Daniel Leon he released the soundtrack for the 2001 video game Tropico and in 2002 for the Tropico - Paradise Island.

He also composed music for famous films such as Talking Lives, Sundown, Live by Night and My Week with Marilyn.

Outside of Canada, Pérez is best known for his touring and recording with Ricardo Lemvo's Makina Loca, where he plays flute, sometimes piano, and sings some vocals. Noted percussionist Edwin Bonilla (longtime member of Gloria Estefan's band) tapped Pérez for his traditional ("duro") sound, having him as a collaborator in his records released by the SAR label. Other musicians who have engaged Pérez in long-time artistic relationships include Johnny Polanco and Hector Cuevas.

Outside of his bandleading and producing skills, Pérez also plays piano, flute, tres and percussion.
