= Evyen Klean =

Evyen Klean is an American record producer and music supervisor. He is best known for production on the HBO film, Bessie, starring Queen Latifah, for which he won a Primetime Emmy for Outstanding Sound Mixing for a Limited Series or a Movie. His additional works include sound production on the television shows Game of Thrones, Veep and The Knick.
