= Dirty Rig =

American band

- Origin: Long Island, New York, U.S.
- Genres: Heavy metal, hard rock
- Years active: 2003–2007
- Labels: Escapi, The Music Cartel
- Members: Kory Clarke "Buckshot" Steve Seabury; Dave Ardolina; Chas
- Past members: Ed Sebastian (vocals); Crock LaRock (drums)

Dirty Rig was an American heavy metal band from Long Island, New York.

== History ==
Dirty Rig was formed in 2003 with Chas, Steve, Crock and Ed. Crock left early in the band's tenure after a health issue caused him to excuse himself from the project to get well. Immediately after, Dave was asked to join the band. They recorded an EP, Blood, Sweat and Beer (also known as Blood, Sweat and Beer Make America Strong) in early 2005, with singer Ed Sebastian who was fired later that year after not attending one of the band's concerts. After Steve mentioned to a mutual friend of his and Clarke's that Dirty Rig was lacking a vocalist, Clarke joined the band. The EP was followed by a full-length album entitled Rock Did It in June 2006. After the release of the album, Dirty Rig toured the United Kingdom in September, later that year.

A music video was filmed for the track "Dogs" from the album Rock Did It.

Dirty Rig broke up in 2007 when Kory Clarke left to reform and front his previous band, Warrior Soul. After a short session searching for a new vocalist, the band split up. Steve Seabury and Dave Ardolina went on to form the sludge metal band, Moth Eater. Chas is now in the New York City band Killcode and Crock formed the New York City band Aunt Hildegard.

== Discography ==
- Blood, Sweat and Beer (2005, EP)
- Rock Did It (2006)
