= It's Goin' Down (X-Ecutioners song) =

Single by the X-Ecutioners featuring Mike Shinoda and Mr. Hahn

from the album Built from Scratch
- Released: 11 March 2002
- Recorded: 2001
- Genre: Nu metal; rap rock
- Length: 4:08 (album version); 3:32 (radio version)
- Label: Loud; Columbia
- Songwriters: Mike Shinoda; Joe Hahn; Melvin Bradford; Alvin Joiner
- Producer: Mike Shinoda

The X-Ecutioners singles chronology
| "Música Negra (Black Music)/Wordplay" (1997) | "It's Goin' Down" (2002) |

Mike Shinoda solo singles chronology
| "It's Goin' Down" (2002) | "Enjoy the Silence 04" (2004) |

"It's Goin' Down" is a song by American turntablists the X-Ecutioners. It features two members of American rock band Linkin Park, rapper Mike Shinoda and turntablist Joe Hahn. It is often mistaken for a Linkin Park track due to their involvement. It was released as the only single from The X-Ecutioners' second studio album Built from Scratch, which was originally released on February 26, 2002. The single was released in March 2002 in CD and vinyl format.

== Background ==
While the song is foremost credited to the X-Ecutioners, it was written and performed primarily by Shinoda and Hahn of the band Linkin Park. It was also produced by Shinoda. The song includes samples of the Xzibit song "Year 2000" and Linkin Park's demo tracks "Step Up" (originally from the original and reissue of the EP Hybrid Theory) and "Dedicated (Demo 1999)" (originally from the LP Underground 2.0 EP). The chorus and bridge of the song both refer to the group as "X-Men", an old name that they changed in order to avoid accusations of copyright infringement.

"It's Goin' Down" peaked at number seven on the UK Singles Chart and number 28 in Australia. In the US, it reached number 85 on the Billboard Hot 100, number 13 on the Hot Modern Rock Tracks chart and number 29 on the Hot Mainstream Rock Tracks chart.

The song also samples Linkin Park songs on two occasions during the intro. First being "Watch them flee/Hip hop heads", which comes from the track "Dedicated (Demo 1999)". The second is a sample saying, "You do it like this," which is from "Step Up". Linkin Park performed "It's Goin' Down" often between 2002 and 2004. They also collaborated with American rapper Snoop Dogg in one performance in which he said a few verses from "Gin and Juice".

== History ==
In an article from Resident Advisor, the song has been carefully described as "a rap rock style to expect from Linkin Park being taken into the X-Ecution chamber, ready to be finally cut up, getting a lot of the JJJ play already, and is quite a decent track with a pretty average and flowless rap from Shinoda." An instrumental version of "It's Goin' Down" on the 12-inch vinyl format is included in the single itself.

== Music video ==
The music video for "It's Goin' Down" also features Linkin Park's Rob Bourdon on drums, Dave Farrell on bass, and Static-X guitarist and frontman Wayne Static on guitar, although they were not involved in the recording of the song. Linkin Park guitarist Brad Delson and late lead vocalist Chester Bennington also made a cameo appearance, as well as other well-known musicians such as Xzibit, Kris Kohls & Mike Ransom of Adema & DJ Babu of Dilated Peoples. In 2018, the staff of Metal Hammer included the music video in the site's list of "the 13 best nu metal videos".

== Track listing ==
CD • iTunes single • UK Promo cassette
| No. | Title | Length |
|---|---|---|
| 1. | "It's Goin' Down" (featuring Mike Shinoda and Joe Hahn) | 4:08 |
| 2. | "X-ecution of a Bum Rush" (featuring The Beat Junkies) | 2:58 |
| 3. | "Play That Beat" (Lo-Fidelity All-Stars Remix) | 4:22 |

UK Promo CD
| No. | Title | Length |
|---|---|---|
| 1. | "It's Goin' Down" (featuring Mike Shinoda and Joe Hahn; Radio Edit) | 3:36 |

Promo CD • US Promo 12"
| No. | Title | Length |
|---|---|---|
| 1. | "It's Goin' Down" (featuring Mike Shinoda and Joe Hahn; Radio Edit) | 3:36 |
| 2. | "It's Goin' Down" (featuring Mike Shinoda and Joe Hahn) | 4:04 |

AT CD single
| No. | Title | Length |
|---|---|---|
| 1. | "It's Goin' Down" (featuring Mike Shinoda and Joe Hahn; Radio Edit) | 3:36 |
| 2. | "Play That Beat" (Lo-Fidelity All-Stars Remix) | 4:22 |

US 12"
| No. | Title | Length |
|---|---|---|
| 1. | "It's Goin' Down" (featuring Mike Shinoda & Mr. Hahn) | 4:08 |
| 2. | "It's Goin' Down" (featuring Mr. Hahn) (Instrumental) | 4:08 |
| 3. | "The X-Ecutioners (Theme) Song" (featuring Dan the Automator) | 4:33 |
| 4. | "It's Goin' Down" (featuring Mr. Hahn) (Scratchappella) | 2:13 |

UK/AT 12"
| No. | Title | Length |
|---|---|---|
| 1. | "It's Goin' Down" (featuring Mike Shinoda and Joe Hahn) | 4:08 |
| 2. | "Play That Beat" (Lo-Fidelity All-Stars Remix) | 4:22 |
| 3. | "X-ecution of a Bum Rush" (featuring The Beat Junkies) | 2:58 |

== Charts ==
=== Weekly charts ===
Weekly chart performance for "It's Goin' Down"
| Chart (2002) | Peak position |
|---|---|
| Australia (ARIA) | 28 |
| Germany (GfK) | 56 |
| Netherlands (Single Top 100) | 82 |
| Scotland Singles (OCC) | 9 |
| Switzerland (Schweizer Hitparade) | 69 |
| UK Singles (OCC) | 7 |
| UK Hip Hop/R&B (OCC) | 3 |
| US Billboard Hot 100 | 85 |
| US Mainstream Rock (Billboard) | 29 |
| US Alternative Airplay (Billboard) | 13 |
| US Hot R&B/Hip-Hop Singles Sales (Billboard) | 54 |

=== Year-end charts ===
Year-end chart performance for "It's Goin' Down"
| Chart (2002) | Position |
|---|---|
| UK Singles (OCC) | 182 |
| US Modern Rock Tracks (Billboard) | 56 |
