= Back to the Beat =

Studio album by Rob Swift
- Released: February 13, 2006
- Recorded: 2005–2006
- Genre: Turntablism; Underground rap
- Label: On the Strength Records
- Producer: Rob Swift

Rob Swift chronology
War Games (2005)	Back to the Beat (2006)

Back to the Beat is the ninth album by the turntablist Rob Swift. It was released on February 13, 2003, by On the Strength Records and was produced by Rob Swift.

== Track listing ==
No.	Title	Length
1.	"Going Postal"
2.	"Can't Stop"
3.	"This Is How It Should Be Done"
4.	"This Is How It Was Done"
5.	"Take a Sec"
6.	"Take a Second Look"
7.	"Had to Gatcha"
8.	"Swift James"
9.	"Heads Up"
10.	"Never Dug Disco"
11.	"Don't Blink"
12.	"Soul Vibration"
13.	"Remix Mad Kick"
14.	"Back to the Beat"
15.	"Pink Cookies"
16.	"Next Up"
17.	"Yo I Believe That's Me"
18.	"Stick Up Kids"
19.	"Beat Down and Out"
