= Rob Swift =

American hip-hop DJ and turntablist (born 1972)

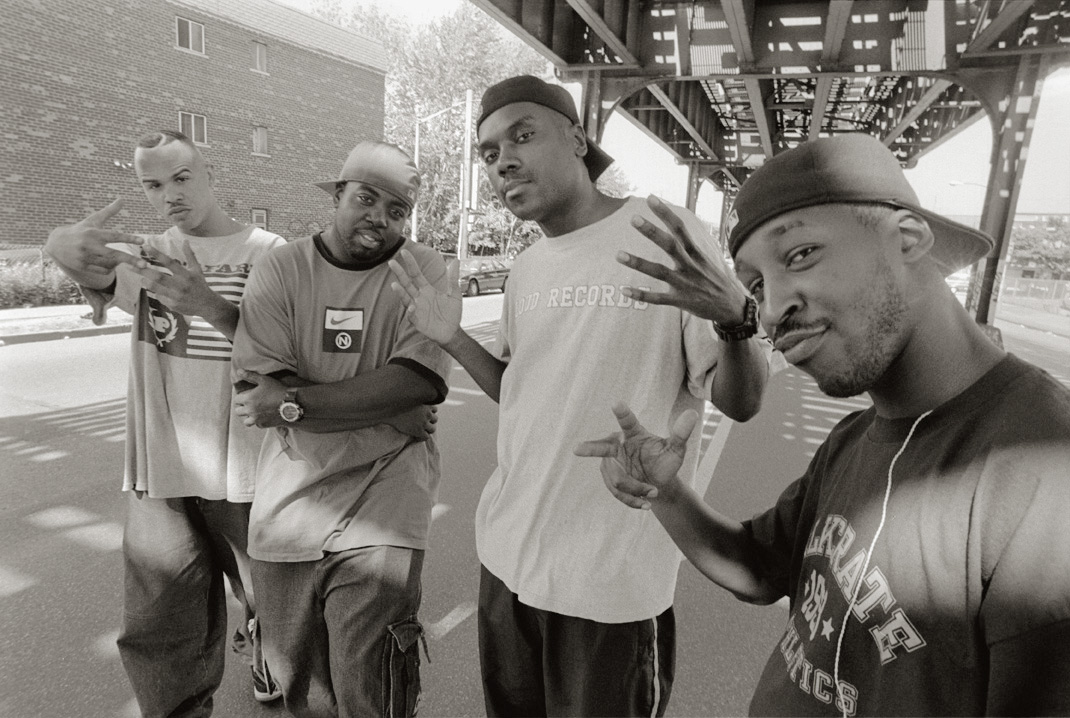
- Rob Swift in Bronx, New York City, 1998

Background information
- Born: Robert Aguilar; May 14, 1972 (age 54); Queens, New York, U.S.
- Genres: Hip hop; Turntablism; Industrial dance
- Occupation: Musician
- Instruments: Turntables; programming
- Years active: 1988–present
- Labels: Ipecac Recordings; Loud; Asphodel
- Formerly of: The X-Ecutioners
- Website: www.djrobswift.com

Rob Swift (born Robert Aguilar; May 14, 1972) is an American hip hop DJ and turntablist. He was an original member of the turntablist group The X-Ecutioners until 2004. Over his career, he has released numerous solo albums and collaborated with various artists, including Mike Patton, Patton's project Peeping Tom, Dan the Automator and Handsome Boy Modeling School, Lords of Acid, Portugal. The Man, and Herbie Hancock.

From January 2010 through May 2015, Swift hosted the online hip-hop radio show Dope on Plastic on Scion A/V Streaming Radio 17.

In August 2012, Swift became the resident DJ for a new late night college sports TV talk show on ESPNU called UNITE.

== Early life ==
Swift was born and raised in Jackson Heights, Queens, by Colombian heritage. He started being an DJ at the age of 12 by watching his father and brother.

Swift educated himself with the classic turntable beats of the early 1980s New York City playground pioneers while listening to funk and jazz at home with his brother. He draws inspiration from Bob James, Herbie Hancock, James Brown, Quincy Jones, Grandmaster Flash and Grand Wizard Theodore.

In 1990, Swift enrolled as a student at Baruch College in New York City and graduated in 1995 with a degree in psychology.

== Career ==
In 1991, Swift joined the groundbreaking turntablist crew the X-Men aka X-ecutioners (Roc Raida, Total Eclipse, and Mista Sinista). Also in 1991, he won the DMC East Coast title.

In 1997, the X-Ecutioners debut their album 'X-Pressions' (Ashpodel), marked the ascent of Swift as a recording artist, evident in the dirt-funky tracks like "Word Play." Five years later, their major-label debut 'Built From Scratch' (Loud/Columbia) propelled the group to stardom with the massive hit "It's Goin’ Down," featuring Linkin Park.

"Following the success of 'It's Goin Down,' our label reps aimed to shift us into a Rap-Rock group, not grasping our core aim of using the turntable as a tool to continually push musical boundaries." — says Swift.

Swift decided to pursue a solo career due to pressure from the label. He released his debut album, The Ablist, in 1998, and a follow-up, Sound Event, in 2002.

“Venturing off into my solo career helped me realize I was just beginning to scratch the surface of my true potential.” Swift says, “the worst thing one can do to an artist is limit them and I started to feel stifled creatively. My departure from the X-Ecutioners was a necessary one cause it freed me from all constraints.” Swift's post-9/11 beat collage War Games (2005), his third solo album, (featuring guest shots from The Large Professor and Bob James) was described by his official biography as “an ominous soundtrack to the DJ's perspective on the state of the contemporary world today. It's complex, intelligent, and provocative…”

In 2001, he was featured in the DJ documentary Scratch (Palm Pictures). He has appeared on ESPN, the Late Show with David Letterman and Sesame Street.

In 2008, Swift was the first hip hop DJ invited to perform at the Savannah Jazz Festival in Georgia. He has collaborated with artists from many genres including Blue Man Group, Herbie Hancock, Scritti Politti, Bob James, Linkin Park, Good Charlotte, Dan The Automator, Fat Joe, Cypress Hill and Bill Laswell. He currently works solo, as part of the group Ill Insanity (featuring former X-Men Total Eclipse and Precision), or collaborating with other like-minded artists.

In January 2010, Swift hosted the online hip-hop radio show Dope on Plastic on Scion A/V Streaming Radio 17 on which he plays mixes and interviews with guest turntablists. Guests have included J-Smoke & DJ Element, Tim Martells, and DJ Platurn.

In February 2010, Swift's solo 18-song turntablism-classical music fusion album The Architect was released by Mike Patton on Ipecac Recordings, which Swift dedicated to Roc Raida who died in 2009. In June 2008, Swift's girlfriend played a piece by Chopin for him on her iPod while he was shaving. In July, he began work on a new album and a month or two into the recording process. He was heard quoting "I listened back to see how to album was starting to shape up. After sitting down and listening to it I started realizing that I was being influenced by this genre of classical that I had a new found love for... I then started creating my music in a way that was reflective of the way that the composers created their pieces. So I started working in movements. I was using sounds and then reintroducing the sounds in other songs. And I sat down and went, 'wow!' All this time, artists like Mozart, Chopin, Beethoven were influencing me on this album subconsciously without me knowing. So once I realized that, then I decided that this album would be a take on what I feel classical composers like Mozart and Chopin would have done if they had turntables." One guest MC, Breez Evahflowin, rhymes about the album's concepts on "Principio" and "Ultimo".

On March 20, 2012, Swift released the album Roc for Raida, a collection of songs (some unreleased) and battle style routines that defined the late fellow X-Ecutioner Roc Raida as an artist, lost interview archives (from John Carluccio), and other material, with proceeds going to Raida's family.

In August 2012, Swift became the resident DJ for UNITE, a late-night college sports television talk show on ESPNU. His role involved scoring highlights from college sports games while the cast discussed sports and current topics.

In September 2014, Swift became a Professor at The New School in New York City and while there taught the course DJ Skills & Styles. Smith's research includes Hip Hop History and culture as well as Musical Composition via turntable techniques.

== Discography ==
=== Albums ===
- 1997 Presents Soulful Fruit (original release on Stones Throw Records)
- 1999 The Ablist
- 2001 Airwave Invasion
- 2002 Sound Event
- 2003 Under the Influence
- 2003 Who Sampled This?
- 2004 OuMuPo 2
- 2005 Wargames (Label Coup De Grâce)
- 2006 Back to the Beat
- 2006 Pure Moods
- 2008 Dust to Dust
- 2010 The Architect
- 2012 Roc for Raida
- 2012 That's the Breaks (Released October 7, 2012)
- 2013 Tupac and Biggie Remix
- 2015 X-Files: Lost & Deleted (Released July 12, 2015)

=== Singles & EPs ===
- 1996 Sly Rhymes / Nickel and Dime (Label Fat Beats)
- 1998 The Ablist (Label Asphodel)
- 1999 Dope On Plastic (Label Asphoel)
- 2002 Interview With Colored Man (Label Tableturns)
- 2003 Sub Level (Label Tableturns)
- 2004 Swift Breaks (Label Tabletools)
- 2004 Hip Hop On Wax (Remix) / Hang With Us (Label Tableturns)
- 2010 Sketches Of The Architect (Label Scion Audio/Visual)
- 2014 You know the Rules (Label III Adrealine Records)
- 2018 I'm Leaving feat. Gudtyme (Label HHV)
- 2022 For Heads That Break – Shawneci Icecold And Rob Swift (Label Underground45 Records)

== Film appearances ==
- 2001 Scratch
- 2007 As the Table Turn (documentary)
- 2009 As the Technics Spin (documentary - Label The Content)
- 2011 DJ Rob Swift - Live! The Documented Movement (documentary)
- 2013 Master Class w/ DJ Rob Swift (documentary)

=== Interviews ===
- 2002 Kelavision - Dj Rob Swift / The X-ecutioners and The Path To a Career As An International Dj.
- 2003 HipHopCore - Rob Swift
- 2010 200dreams - Exclusive Interview: Dj Rob Swift
- 2019 Bringing Down The Band - ROB SWIFT (of The X-Ecutioners) Interview w/ New Old Heads Backstage Series
- 2019 WithOut No DJ Podcast - Rob Swift, Mista Sinista, & Dilly
- 2020 MikiDz Show - Da Odd Couple (Rob Swift & Mista Sinista)
- 2023 Juan Ep Is Life - Rob Swift talks DMC competitions, Akinyele, Roc Raida, and The X-Ecutioners
- Who?Mag - Interview Rob Swift

=== Mixtapes / Performances ===
- 1992 - 2000 ITF France Showcase - Rob Swift
- 2003 Under the Influence - Mixed by Rob Swift performed by Rob Swift, 1972 and DJ Klever (Six Degrees Records)
- 2009 DMC World - The DMC World Finals
- 2009 TTM Method - Rob Swift
