= The X-Ecutioners =

American hip-hop group

the X-Ecutioners
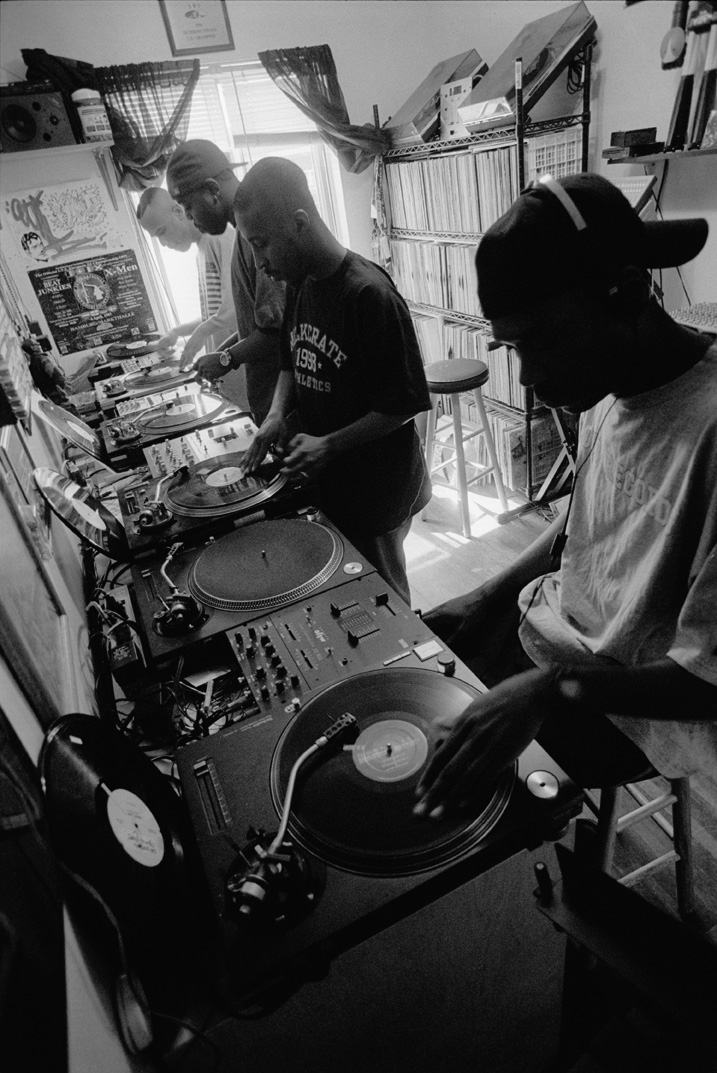
- The X-Ecutioners performing in 1998

Background information
- Also known as: X-Men
- Origin: New York City, New York, U.S.
- Genres: Hip-hop, turntablism; experimental hip-hop; instrumental hip-hop
- Years active: 1989–present
- Spinoffs: Ill Insanity
- Members: Total Eclipse; DJ Boogie Blind; DJ Precision
- Past members: Mista Sinista; Rob Swift; Roc Raida (deceased)

The X-Ecutioners, originally known as X-Men, are a group of American hip-hop DJs/turntablists from New York City. The group formed in 1989 and consists of Total Eclipse, DJ Boogie Blind, and DJ Precision. Original members included Mista Sinista, Rob Swift, and Roc Raida (d. 2009). Swift and Total Eclipse formed a side project called Ill Insanity in 2007. The X-Ecutioners have released four studio albums and two compilations.

== History ==
The X-Ecutioners formed as a DJ crew in 1989 that originally included 11 members, under the name X-Men, after the Marvel Comics superhero team. They later changed it for trademark reasons.

The group's lineup was eventually reduced to Rob Swift, Roc Raida, Total Eclipse, and Mista Sinista, and they released their debut studio album, X-Pressions, in 1997. Mista Sinista left the group shortly after the publication of their second album, Built from Scratch, in 2001, which included contributions from such artists as Large Professor, Dan the Automator, Mike Shinoda and Mr. Hahn of Linkin Park, Xzibit, Everlast, and Big Pun. In 2003, they contributed a remix of Run-DMC's "King of Rock" to the Harmonix game Amplitude.

Their third record, Revolutions, released in 2004, had input from such names as Blue Man Group, Ghostface Killah, Rob Zombie, and Fat Joe, among others. The same year, the group contributed several songs and wrote the score to the video game NFL Street.

In 2005, the X-Ecutioners issued General Patton vs. The X-Ecutioners, a collaboration with Mike Patton (Faith No More, Mr. Bungle).

In 2007, Rob Swift, Total Eclipse, and DJ Precision formed the group Ill Insanity, issuing the album Ground Xero a year later, which includes Roc Raida on one track.

Roc Raida died in 2009.

== Band members ==
Current

- Total Eclipse – turntables (1996–present)
- DJ Boogie Blind – turntables (2004–present)
- DJ Precision – turntables (2004–present)

Past

- Mista Sinista – turntables (1989–2001)
- Rob Swift – turntables (1989–2004)
- Roc Raida – turntables (1989–2009; his death)

== Discography ==
=== Studio albums ===
Title	Details	Chart positions		
Title	Details	US	US R&B/HH	AUS
X-Pressions	Released: September 23, 1997; Label: Asphodel	—	—	—
Built from Scratch	Released: February 26, 2002; Label: Loud	15	13	62
Revolutions	Released: June 8, 2004; Label: Loud	118	50	—
General Patton vs. The X-Ecutioners	Released: February 5, 2005; Label: Ipecac Recordings	—	—	—

=== Compilations ===
- Japan X-Clusive (1997)
- Scratchology (2003)

=== Singles ===
- "It's Goin' Down" (2002)
