= Roc Raida =

American DJ, turntablist, and producer (1972–2009)

Background information
- Also known as: Grandmaster Roc Raida
- Born: Anthony Williams; May 17, 1972; Manhattan, New York City, U.S.
- Origin: New York City, U.S.
- Died: September 19, 2009 (aged 37) New York City, U.S.
- Genres: Hip hop; turntablism
- Occupations: DJ; turntablist; producer
- Years active: 1989–2009
- Labels: Asphodel; Loud/Columbia/SME; Ipecac; Epic; Fat Beats
- Formerly of: The X-Ecutioners

Anthony Williams (May 17, 1972 – September 19, 2009), better known as Roc Raida or Grandmaster Roc Raida, was an American DJ, turntablist and producer. He was also a member of the DJ group the X-Ecutioners.

== Biography ==
Williams joined the X-Men in the late 1980s, but due to copyright reasons, the group later became known as the X-Ecutioners. The group released three studio albums, 1997's X-Pressions, 2002's Built from Scratch and 2004's Revolutions. In the 1990s he and MF Grimm were an emcee/DJ team, and his DJ contributions can be heard on MF Grimm's Scars & Memories compilation. In addition to his work with MF Grimm and the X-Ecutioners, Roc Raida released albums as a solo artist, his most famous being 2005's Rock Phenomenon, a mash-up album he released with DJ Vlad that blended rock and hip hop, which won the Mash-Up Mixtape of the Year at the Justo Mixtape Awards. He also produced songs for artists including Ill Al Skratch, Showbiz and A.G., the Jungle Brothers, Mad Skillz, Smif-N-Wessun, Jehst, and Big Pun, Linkin Park and he served as Busta Rhymes' DJ.

He won the 1995 DMC World DJ Championship and was inducted into the DMC Hall of Fame four years later. He was the DJ for rapper MF Grimm through the mid-1990s, during both of the early stages of their careers. He also appeared in the 2001 film Scratch and the international television series Kung Faux. He had made an appearance in Linkin Park's album Reanimation (2002) in participating in the song "X-Ecutioner style".

He died on September 19, 2009, from cardiac arrest due to complications a few weeks earlier relating to an accident while training in Krav Maga.

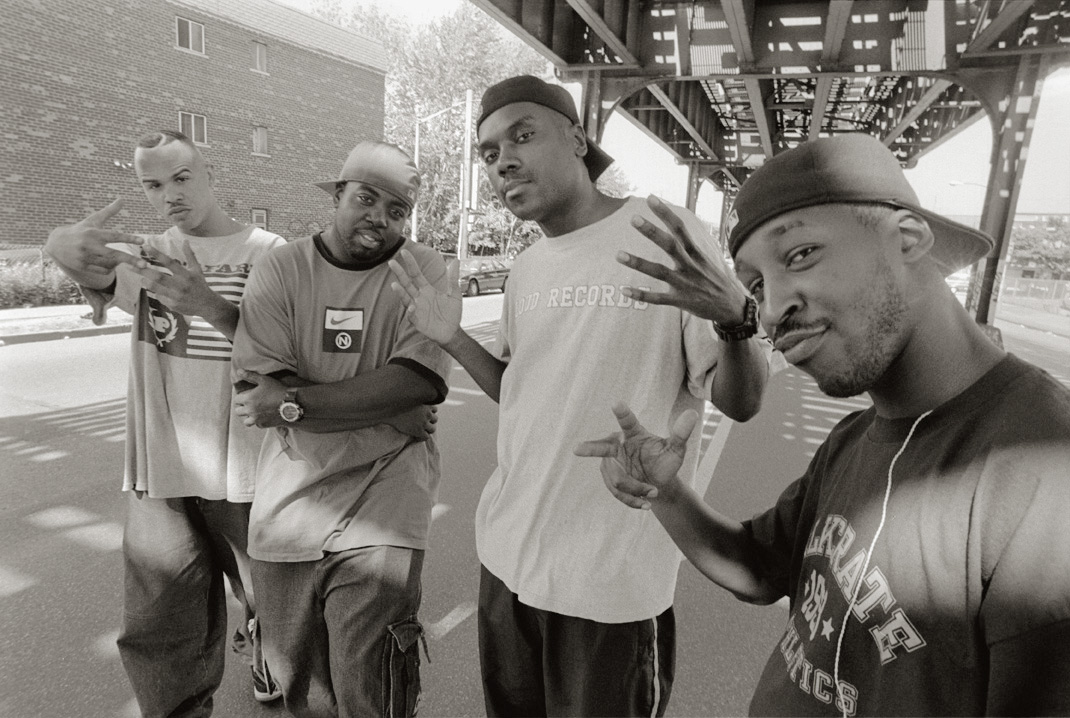
The X-Ecutioners in the Bronx/NYC near Roc Raidas home

On March 20, 2012, Rob Swift released the album Roc for Raida, a collection of songs (some unreleased) and battle style routines that defined Roc Raida as an artist, lost interview archives (from John Carluccio), and other material, with proceeds going to Roc Raida's family.

== Discography ==
=== Solo ===
- 1997: The Adventures of Roc Raida... One Too Many!
- 2000: Crossfaderz
- 2001: We Them Niggas
- 2003: Champion Sounds
- 2004: Kung Faux
- 2005: Rock Phenomenon which went on to win the Justo Mixtape Awards- Mash Up Mixtape of the Year w/ DJ VLAD
- 2007: Beats, Cuts and Skits

=== With The X-Ecutioners ===
- 1997: X-Pressions
- 2002: Built from Scratch
- 2004: Revolutions
