= Del the Funky Homosapien discography =

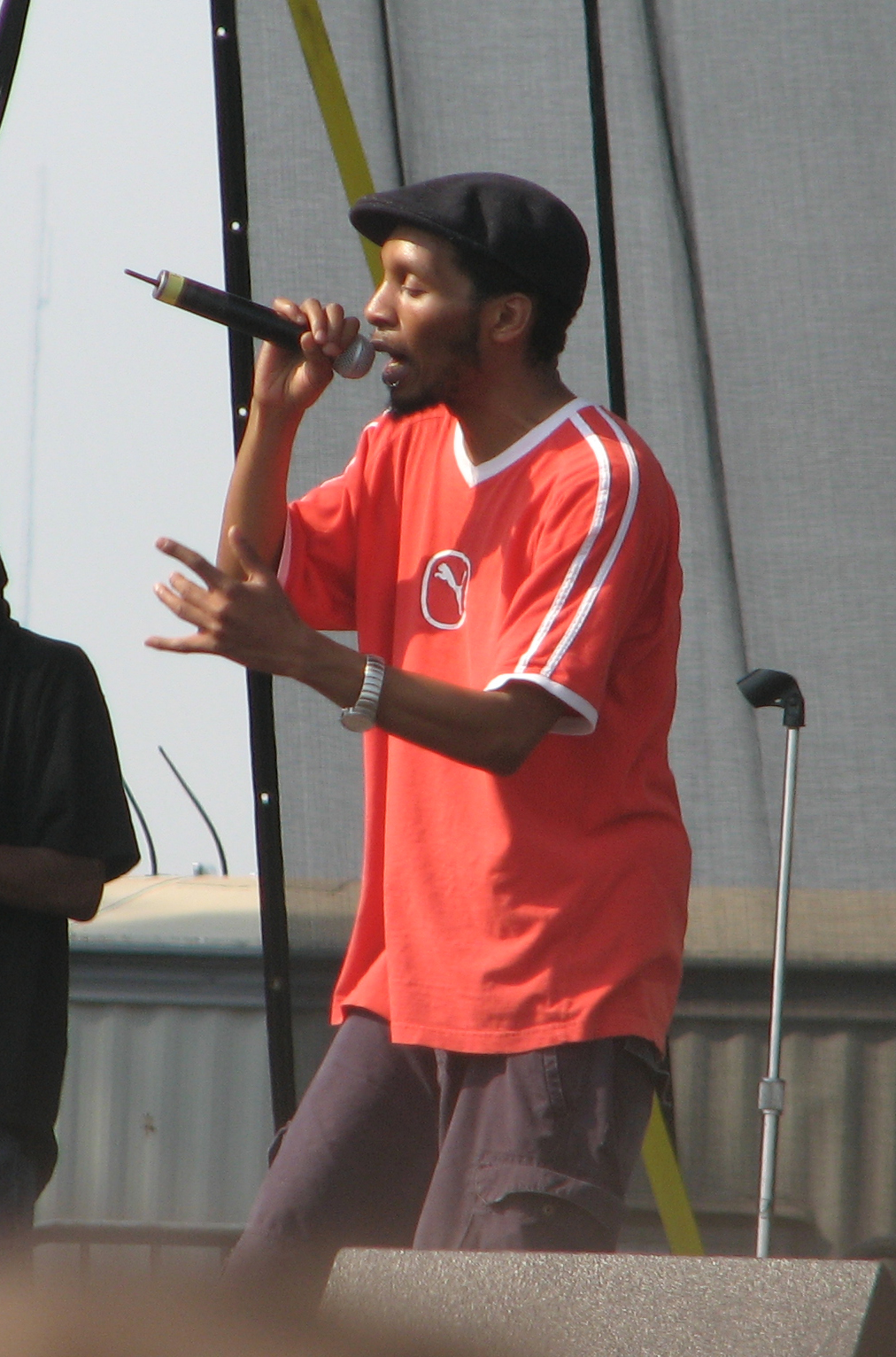
- Del performing at Austin City Limits, September 26, 2008
- Studio albums: 11
- Compilation albums: 1
- Singles: 9
- Collaborations: 7

The discography of Del the Funky Homosapien consists of eleven studio albums and one compilation album.

== Albums ==
=== Studio albums ===
Year	Album	Peak chart positions			
Year	Album	US	US R&B	US Rap	US Heat
1991	I Wish My Brother George Was Here: Released: October 22, 1991; Label: Elektra; Format: CD, CS, LP	123	48	*	24
1993	No Need for Alarm: Released: November 23, 1993; Label: Elektra; Format: CD, CS, LP	125	27	*	1
1997	Future Development: Released: November 18, 1997; Label: Hieroglyphics Imperium; Format: CD, CS, LP	115	22	*	25
2000	Both Sides of the Brain: Released: April 11, 2000; Label: Hieroglyphics Imperium; Format: CD, CS, LP	118	63	*	2
2008	Eleventh Hour: Released: March 11, 2008; Label: Definitive Jux; Format: CD	122	58	23	1
2009	Funk Man (The Stimulus Package): Released: April 7, 2009; Label: Self-released; Format: CD	—	—	—	—
2009	Automatik Statik: Released: September 28, 2009; Label: Self-released; Format: CD	—	—	—	—
2010	It Ain't Illegal Yet: Released: August 5, 2010; Label: Self-released; Format: CD	—	—	—	—
2011	Golden Era: Released: April 18, 2011; Label: Funnyman; Format: CD	—	—	—	28
2012	Root Stimulation: Released: April 20, 2012; Label: Self-released; Format: CD, DL	—	—	—	—
2014	Iller Than Most: Released: January 1, 2014; Label: Self-released; Format: DL	—	—	—	—
"—" denotes releases that did not chart.

=== Compilations ===
Year	Album
2004	The Best of Del tha Funkee Homosapien: The Elektra Years: Released: February 10, 2004; Label: Rhino Records, Elektra Records

=== Collaborations ===
Year	Album
1998	3rd Eye Vision (with Hieroglyphics): Released: March 24, 1998; Label: Hieroglyphics Imperium Recordings
2000	Deltron 3030 (with Dan the Automator & Kid Koala as Deltron 3030): Released: October 17, 2000; Label: 75 Ark
2003	Full Circle (with Hieroglyphics): Released: October 7, 2003; Label: Hieroglyphics Imperium Recordings
2009	Parallel Uni-Verses (with Tame One): Released: October 13, 2009; Label: Gold Dust Media
2012	Attractive Sin (with Parallel Thought): Released: June 19, 2012; Label: Parallel Thought LTD
2013	The Kitchen (with Hieroglyphics): Released: July 16, 2013; Label: Hieroglyphics Imperium Recordings
2013	Event 2 (with Dan the Automator & Kid Koala as Deltron 3030): Released: September 30, 2013; Label: Bulk Recordings
2018	Gate 13 (with Amp Live): Released: April 20, 2018; Label: Gate 13
2021	Subatomic (with Kool Keith as FNKPMPN): Released: July 20, 2021; Label: Threshold Recordings

== Singles ==
Year	Song	US R&B	US Rap	AUS	Album
1991	"Mistadobalina"	55	6	11	I Wish My Brother George Was Here
1991	"Sleepin' on My Couch"	—	—	—	I Wish My Brother George Was Here
1992	"Dr. Bombay.."	—	—	160	I Wish My Brother George Was Here
1993	"Catch a Bad One"	—	—	—	No Need for Alarm
1994	"Wrong Place"	—	48	—	No Need for Alarm
1999	"Phoney Phranchise"	—	47	—	Both Sides of the Brain
2000	"If You Must"	—	27	—	Both Sides of the Brain
2008	"Workin' It"	—	—	—	Eleventh Hour
2011	"One out of a Million"	—	—	—	Golden Era
"—" denotes releases that did not chart.

== Appearances ==
Year	Song	US	UK	Album
1993	"Limitations" (Souls of Mischief featuring Casual)	—	—	93 'til Infinity
1993	"Front Man" (Del Mix) (New Kingdom)			Non-album single
1993	"Good Times" (Del Mix) (New Kingdom)			Non-album single
1993	"Missing Link" (Dinosaur Jr.)			Judgment Night (soundtrack)
1994	"Who's It On?" (Casual featuring Pep Love)	—	—	Fear Itself
1994	"A Little Something" (Casual)	—	—	Fear Itself
1995	"'94 Via Satellite" (Souls of Mischief)	—	—	No Man's Land
1995	"17 Slaves" (African Identity)	—	—	You Won't Come to My Funeral
1996	"Critics" (Extra Prolific)			2 for 15
1996	"Food Fight" (Digital Underground)	—	—	Future Rhythm
1997	"Three Emcees" (Kool DJ E.Q. featuring Xzibit and Casual)	—	—	—N/a
1998	"The Repo Man Sings for You" (The Coup)	—	—	Steal This Album
1999	"The Projects (PJays)" [Handsome Boy Modeling School featuring Trugoy)	—	—	So... How's Your Girl?
1999	"Magnetizing" (Handsome Boy Modeling School)	—	—	So... How's Your Girl?
1999	"Left Field" (Swollen Members featuring Unicorn)	—	—	Balance
1999	"hoe!"			Defenders of the Underworld
1999	"A Lesson Garden" (Eligh)			Gas Dream
1999	"Re:Chill" (Various Blends)	—	—	Levitude
2000	"Ice Pirates" (Sunspot Jonz)	—	—	Child ov the Storm
2001	"Sound Science (Remix)" [Souls of Mischief			—N/a
2001	"Clint Eastwood" (Gorillaz)	57	4	Gorillaz
2001	"Rock the House" (Gorillaz)	—	18	Gorillaz
2001	"All We Know" (Virtuoso featuring Casual)	—	—	World War I: The Voice of Reason
2001	"Del Meets the Dummies" (Stimulated Dummies)			—N/a
2003	"360 Degrees" (Push Button Objects featuring Mr. Lif and DJ Craze)	—	—	Ghetto Blaster
2003	"Take It Back" (Casual featuring Del the Funky Homosapien, Tajai and Volume 10)	—	—	Truck Driver
2004	"The World's Gone Mad" (Handsome Boy Modeling School featuring Alex Kapranos, Barrington Levy)	—	82	White People
2004	"Size Double D" (Dopestyle 1231 featuring Del the Funky Homosapien)	—	—	Dopestyle 1231
2004	"War of the Masses" (Virtuoso featuring Del the Funky Homosapien)	—	—	World War II: Evolution of the Torturer
2004	"On the Run Again" (Virtuoso featuring Del the Funky Homosapien and Jaz-O)	—	—	World War II: Evolution of the Torturer
2005	"What's Wrong with This Picture (Opio featuring Del the Funky Homosapien)			Triangulation Station
2005	"What U Hear" (Zion I featuring Del the Funky Homosapien)	—	—	True & Livin'
2005	"Fragments" (Del the Funky Homosapien)	—	—	Wu-Tang Meets the Indie Culture
2005	"Preservation" (Aesop Rock and Del the Funky Homosapien)	—	—	Wu-Tang Meets the Indie Culture
2006	"I'm Just Raw (Reopened & Remixed)" [Lyrics Born featuring Del the Funky Homosapien, Pigeon John and Tim Alexander]	—	—	Overnite Encore: Lyrics Born Live
2006	"Fallicies" (King Medallion vs. Arch Angel featuring Del the Funky Homosapien)	—	—	Blak Majik
2006	"Freal Version" (Bukue One featuring Del the Funky Homosapien, EMC, Abstract Rude, Ammbush, Motion Man and Mikah 9)	—	—	Intromission
2007	"Rockin' It" (Twigy featuring Del the Funky Homosapien and You The Rock)	—	—	Akasatana
2008	"Mr. Officer" (Snob Scrilla)	—	—	The Day Before
2008	"Whatta Ya See" (Hopie featuring Kid Static)	—	—	The Diamond Dame
2008	"Everytime" (Mike Relm featuring Adrian Hartley)	—	—	Spectacle
2008	"Video Tapez" (AmpLive)	—	—	—N/a
2009	"Dreamin'" (Gift of Gab featuring Brother Ali)	—	—	Escape 2 Mars
2009	"Get It" (Tash)	—	—	Control Freek
2009	"Samba Soul" (N.A.S.A. featuring DJ Qbert)	—	—	The Spirit of Apollo
2009	"Lothar" (Sleep)	—	—	Hesitation Wounds
2009	"Oops (Shmegma)" (Tame One & Parallel Thought featuring Del the Funky Homosapien)	—	—	Acid Tab Vocab
2010	"Do It Right Now" (Modern Science featuring Del the Funky Homosapien)	—	—	How the World Ends
2010	"Ginsu Knives" (Psalm One featuring Del the Funky Homosapien)	—	—	Woman at Work Vol. 3
2010	"Down on the Westside" (Cisco Adler featuring Del the Funky Homosapien and Danny Way)	—	—	Supercalifragilisticexpialidocious
2010	"Stoned" (C. Young featuring Del the Funky Homosapien)	—	—	1991 EP
2011	"Oakland" (Lateef the Truthspeaker featuring Del the Funky Homosapien and The Grouch)	—	—	Firewire
2011	"Hyperbolic" (Flash Bang Grenada featuring Del the Funky Homosapien)	—	—	10 Haters
2011	"Chicken (Ready to Go)" (Unwritten Law featuring Del the Funky Homosapien)	—	—	Swan
2011	"Hip Hop Head" (Blastah Beatz featuring Del the Funky Homosapien and Pumpkinhead)	—	—	Graduate Studies
2011	"Flamethrower" (Casual featuring Del the Funky Homosapien)	—	—	He Think He #Rapgod
2011	"Song of Siren" (Dan Sena featuring Del the Funky Homosapien and Kylee Swenson)	—	—	Candy Floss Art Capitalist
2011	"Space Case" (Hopie featuring Del the Funky Homosapien)	—	—	Raw Gems
2011	"Golden Era" (Opio & Equipto featuring Del the Funky Homosapien)	—	—	Red X Tapes
2011	"No No" (Illuminati Congo featuring Del the Funky Homosapien)	—	—	All Eye See
2012	"PG&E" (Lee Bannon featuring Del the Funky Homosapien and Sol)	—	—	Fantastic Plastic
2012	"The Things" (Lee Bannon featuring Del the Funky Homosapien)	—	—	Fantastic Plastic
2012	"Respect Game or Expect Flames" (Casual and J. Rawls featuring Del the Funky Homosapien)	—	—	Respect Game or Expect Flames
2012	"Smoke Rings" (The Dirty Heads featuring Del the Funky Homosapien)	—	—	Cabin by the Sea
2012	"The Ride" (¡Mayday! featuring Del the Funky Homosapien)	—	—	Thrift Store Halos
2012	"Avantegarde" (Phesto Dee featuring Del the Funky Homosapien)	—	—	Background Check
2012	"Prolly Get Slapped" (Luckyiam featuring Del the Funky Homosapien and Scarub)	—	—	Time to Get Lucky
2012	"I'm Not Lonely" (White Mic featuring Del the Funky Homosapien and Andre Nickatina)	—	—	—N/a
2013	"CNN" (Kool A.D. featuring Del the Funky Homosapien and Ladybug Mecca)	—	—	Not O.K.
2013	"Bay of Pigs" (Vast Aire featuring Del the Funky Homosapien, Pidi T and Virtuoso)	—	—	Best of the Best Vol. 1
2013	"From Conception to 2 Cremation" (Abstract Rude featuring Del the Funky Homosapien)	—	—	Dear Abbey, The Lost Letters Mixtape
2013	"Snowgoons Infantry" (Snowgoons and Virtuoso featuring Del the Funky Homosapien and Reks)	—	—	Covirt Ops: Infantry
2013	"Lighters" (First Light featuring Del the Funky Homosapien, Casual and A-Plus)	—	—	Fallacy Fantasy
2013	"Back to the Roots" (Marcus D featuring Del the Funky Homosapien)	—	—	Simply Complex
2013	"Beast Mode" (Figure featuring Del the Funky Homosapien)	—	—	Horns of the Apocalypse EP
2013	"War Call" (Figure featuring Del the Funky Homosapien)	—	—	Horns of the Apocalypse EP
2013	"From the Town" (Money-B featuring Del the Funky Homosapien, Yukmouth and Shady Nate)	—	—	—N/a
2013	"Viberian Son" (JJ Doom featuring Del the Funky Homosapien)	—	—	Key to the Kuffs (Butter Edition)
2014	"Life and Time" (Kool A.D. featuring Del the Funky Homosapien and Ladybug Mecca)	—	—	Word O.K.
2014	"Strange Universe" (CunninLynguists featuring Del the Funky Homosapien)	—	—	Strange Journey Volume Three
2014	"Bouillon" (Slimkid3 & DJ Nu-Mark featuring Del the Funky Homosapien and Murs)	—	—	Slimkid3 & DJ Nu-Mark
2014	"Liquifly" (DJ Qbert featuring Del the Funky Homosapien)	—	—	GalaXXXian
2014	"Do What We Wanna Do" (Pete Cannon and Dr. Syntax featuring Del the Funky Homosapien and Jehst)	—	—	Killer Combo
2015	"Del's Couch" (Busdriver featuring Del the Funky Homosapien)	—	—	Thumbs
2015	"What Is Your Name" (Sean Anonymous + Dimitry Killstorm featuring Del the Funky Homosapien and Haphduzn)	—	—	Better Days
2015	"In My Veins" (Basecamp featuring Del the Funky Homosapien and Billie Black)	—	—	—N/a
2016	"World Renown" (Mr. Lif featuring Del the Funky Homosapien)	—	—	Don't Look Down
2016	"Rise Up" (Murs featuring Del the Funky Homosapien, Fashawn, Black Thought, Questlove and Domino)	—	—	Street Fighter V Theme
2016	"Education" (Chuuwee featuring Del the Funky Homosapien)	—	—	Economics
2016	"Beyond" (Luck & Lana Kill The Computer featuring Del the Funky Homosapien and Aesop Rock)	—	—	GO
2016	"Maralém" (Brookzill! featuring Del the Funky Homosapien and Pequeno Cidadão)	—	—	Throwback to the Future
2016	"The Good News" (thegoodnews. featuring Del the Funky Homosapien, Pete Feliciano, Ethan Baxley and Taka Tozawa)	—	—	thegoodnews.
2016	"You'll Need a Cosign" (thegoodnews. featuring Del the Funky Homosapien)	—	—	thegoodnews.
2016	"The Doors" (thegoodnews. featuring Del the Funky Homosapien, Gee and Jam Baxter)	—	—	thegoodnews.
2017	"Pizza Shop Extended" (Jay IDK featuring Yung Gleesh, MF Doom, and Del the Funky Homosapien)	—	—	IWasVeryBad
2017	"Blame the Author" (L'Orange featuring Del the Funky Homosapien)	—	—	The Ordinary Man
2017	"Small World" (Def3 featuring Del the Funky Homosapien, Moka Only and The Gaff)	—	—	Small World
2017	"One of These Days" (Halo Orbit featuring Del the Funky Homosapien)	—	—	Halo Orbit
2017	"Lone Wolves" (Cas One vs. Figure featuring Del the Funky Homosapien and Carnage The Executioner)	—	—	So Our Egos Don't Kill Us
2018	"Is It Worth It?" (Lyrics Born featuring Del the Funky Homosapien)	—	—	Quite a Life
2018	"Stay in Yo Lane" (Dub Esquire featuring Del the Funky Homosapien, Mawnstr and P.E.A.C.E.)	—	—	The Return
2018	"Human Tones" (Ill Equipt featuring Del the Funky Homosapien)	—	—	The Paradigm Project
2021	"Keep Walkin' On (Khrysis featuring Del the Funky Homosapien)			The Hour of Khrysis
2021	"Bounty Law" (Doctor Destruction featuring Del the Funky Homosapien & Ghostface Killah)	—	—	Planetory Destruction
2021	"Everybody" (Wax Tailor featuring Del the Funky Homosapien & Mr. Lif)			The Shadow of Their Suns
2021	"Jason & The Czargonauts" (Czarface & MF Doom featuring Del the Funky Homosapien)	—	—	Trip Around Saturn
2021	"Brain Fog" (Little Stranger featuring Del The Funky Homosapien)	—	—	Super What?
2022	"Rebellion (AwareNess Remix)" (Angelo Moore & the Brand New Step featuring Del the Funky Homosapien)			Non-album single
2023	"Captain Chicken" (Gorillaz featuring Del the Funky Homosapien)	—	—	Cracker Island
2023	"Catch Me" (Parallel Thought featuring Del the Funky Homosapien)			—N/a
2023	"The Return" (Living Legends featuring Del the Funky Homosapien)			The Return
2024	"I Am Happy" (Awolnation featuring Del the Funky Homosapien)	—	—	The Phantom Five
2024	"Oops" (Tame One featuring Parallel Thought & Del the Funky Homosapien)			Acid Tab Vocab
2026	"Potholes" (Frak featuring Del the Funky Homosapien)	—	—	Four Square
2026	"Evolver" (Squadda B featuring Del the Funky Homosapien)			Evolver
"—" denotes releases that did not chart.
