= The Best of Del tha Funkee Homosapien: The Elektra Years =

Compilation album by Del tha Funkee Homosapien
- Released: February 10, 2004
- Genre: Hip-hop
- Length: 61:25
- Label: Rhino; Elektra
- Producer: Del tha Funkee Homosapien; Boogiemen; Ice Cube; SD50; Casual; A-Plus; Opio; Tajai; J Mascis

Del tha Funkee Homosapien chronology
Both Sides of the Brain (2000)	The Best of Del tha Funkee Homosapien: The Elektra Years (2004)	Eleventh Hour (2008)

Professional ratings
Review scores
Source	Rating
AllMusic	4/5 stars
Pitchfork	6.3/10
RapReviews.com	10/10
The Rolling Stone Album Guide	3.5/5 stars

The Best of Del tha Funkee Homosapien: The Elektra Years is a compilation album by American hip-hop musician Del tha Funkee Homosapien. It was released by Rhino Records and Elektra Records in 2004. It includes tracks from I Wish My Brother George Was Here and No Need for Alarm, as well as B-side tracks and remixes. It peaked at number 35 on the CMJ Hip-Hop chart.

== Critical reception ==
Andy Kellman of AllMusic gave the album 4 stars out of 5, saying: "This includes most of the best moments from George and 1994 follow-up, No Need for Alarm, making it valuable for those who haven't been able to track them down." He added: "However, those who have followed Del all along should also take note; this set also contains a small bounty of B-sides, most of which are of some import." Rollie Pemberton of Pitchfork gave the album a 6.3 out of 10, saying, "without the powerful straight-rap from the majority of No Need for Alarm, this Elektra-only greatest hits package fails on its own concept."

== Track listing ==
No.	Title	Length
1.	"Mistadobalina"	4:19
2.	"Made in America" (SD50 B-Boy Mix)	3:11
3.	"Dr. Bombay"	4:44
4.	"Wrong Place" (Casual Remix)	4:57
5.	"Wack M.C.'s"	3:38
6.	"Ahonetwo, Ahonetwo" (Remix)	3:42
7.	"Catch a Bad One" (Remix)	4:08
8.	"Sleepin' on My Couch"	3:21
9.	"Eye Examination"	3:48
10.	"Burnt" (featuring Hieroglyphics)	4:44
11.	"Missing Link" (featuring Dinosaur Jr.)	3:58
12.	"The Undisputed Champs" (featuring Q-Tip, Pep Love, and Jay-Biz)	4:14
13.	"Hoodz Come in Dozens" (SD50 Remix)	3:04
14.	"Mistadobalina" (Remix)	3:59
15.	"Ahonetwo, Ahonetwo"	2:48
16.	"Dr. Bombay" (Remix)	3:21
