= The Corner (album) =

Compilation album by Hieroglyphics
- Released: September 20, 2005
- Recorded: 2005
- Genre: Alternative hip-hop
- Length: 40:30
- Label: Hieroglyphics Imperium Recordings

Hieroglyphics chronology
Hieroglyphics Oldies, Vol. II (1998)	The Corner (2005)	Over Time (2007)

The Corner is the fourth compilation album released by the Oakland, California-based, underground hip-hop collective, Hieroglyphics. The album was released on September 20, 2005 by the group's own independent record label, Hieroglyphics Imperium Recordings.

== Track listing ==
1. "What The Funk" (Producer Q. Tones) (Artist J. Owens, O. Lindsey, T. Massey, A. Carter) – 03:17
2. "Say That Then" (Producer J. Zone) (Artist J. Owens) – 03:28
3. "Talk Dirty" (Producer A. Carter) (Artist O. Lindsey) (featuring P. Peacock) – 03:41
4. "Phenomenon" (Producer Mike Loe) (Artist O. Credle) – 04:00
5. "Raindance" (Producer Elon.js) (Artist T. Massey) – 03:01
6. "Good Time Charlie" (ProducerCompound7), (Artist A. Carter) – 04:15
7. "I'm Gonna Make It" (T. Jones) – 04:54
8. "Stop Lock" (Producer Anoimous for Tree Monkey Productions) (Artist P. Peacock) – 4:08
9. "Stars" (O. Lindsey) – 03:26
10. "Everybodys Gangsta"(Shake Da Mayor) – 03:29
11. "Love Flowin (Live)" (Produced O. Lindsey) (Artist J. Owens, O. Lindsey, P. Peacock, A. Carter) – 2:57
