= Smash Rockwell =

Studio album by Casual
- Released: September 6, 2005
- Genre: Hip hop
- Length: 58:21
- Label: Hiero Imperium
- Producer: J-Zone; Domino; Bedrock; Casual; Jake One; Compound 7; Dan the Automator; Quincy Jones; Dante Ross

Casual chronology
| Truck Driver (2003) | Smash Rockwell (2005) | The Hierophant (2011) |

Smash Rockwell is a studio album by American hip hop musician Casual. It was released on Hiero Imperium on September 6, 2005.

== Critical reception ==
Professional ratings
Review scores
| Source | Rating |
|---|---|
| AllMusic | 3.5/5 stars |
| IGN | favorable |
| Prefix | 8.0/10 |
| RapReviews | 7.5/10 |
| Stylus Magazine | C+ |

Andy Kellman of AllMusic gave the album 3.5 stars out of 5, writing, "The album is fairly uniform and consistently strong, despite the range of producers involved, and Casual is in improved form lyrically, nearly as sharp as he was throughout 1994's Fear Itself." He added, "All the talk of taking things back to the early '90s can become nearly as grating as relentless gun talk, but Casual is thankfully less irritable than he was on He Think He Raw." Dan Nishimoto of Stylus Magazine gave the album a grade of C+, stating, "When the grab-bag approach works, it certainly works to his advantage; from pimp strut to battlecat posturing, he gets to bake and taste the cake."

Spence D. of IGN included it on the "Top 26 Albums of 2005" list.

== Track listing ==
| No. | Title | Producer(s) | Length |
|---|---|---|---|
| 1. | "Say That Then" | J-Zone | 3:26 |
| 2. | "Rap Game" | Domino | 3:27 |
| 3. | "Smash Don't Hurt 'Em" | Bedrock | 4:06 |
| 4. | "Oaktown" (featuring E Mac, Too Short, G Stack, and Richie Rich) | Casual | 5:17 |
| 5. | "Styles" | Domino | 4:41 |
| 6. | "Bitin' and Freakin'" (featuring Psalm One) | Jake One | 3:54 |
| 7. | "In the Whip" | Compound 7 | 4:15 |
| 8. | "Nickel and Dime Gangsta" (featuring E-40) | Jake One | 4:06 |
| 9. | "Critical" | Dan the Automator | 3:14 |
| 10. | "Hieroller" (featuring Opio and Tajai) | J-Zone | 2:57 |
| 11. | "Single Mother" | Quincy Jones | 4:14 |
| 12. | "All Around the World" | Casual | 3:00 |
| 13. | "Bay vs. Bricks" (featuring Young Zee) | Dante Ross | 4:43 |
| 14. | "I'll Hit That" | Casual | 3:03 |
| 15. | "Wakemup" | Compound 7 | 3:58 |
| Total length: | | | 58:21 |

== Personnel ==
Credits adapted from liner notes.

- Casual – vocals, production (4, 12, 14), executive production
- J-Zone – production (1, 10)
- Domino – production (2, 5), executive production
- Bedrock – production (3)
- E Mac – vocals (4)
- Too Short – vocals (4)
- G Stack – vocals (4)
- Richie Rich – vocals (4)
- Psalm One – vocals (6)
- Jake One – production (6, 8)
- Compound 7 – production (7, 15)
- E-40 – vocals (8)
- Dan the Automator – production (9)
- Opio – vocals (10)
- Tajai – vocals (10)
- Quincy Jones – production (11)
- Young Zee – vocals (13)
- Dante Ross – production (13)
- Oh, So Nappy! – design
- James Patrick Dawson – photography
- Ian Davis – executive production
