= Attractive Sin =

Studio album by Del the Funky Homosapien and Parallel Thought
- Released: June 19, 2012
- Genre: Hip-hop
- Length: 42:44
- Label: Parallel Thought LTD.
- Producer: Parallel Thought

Del the Funky Homosapien and Parallel Thought chronology
Parallel Uni-Verses (2009)	Attractive Sin (2012)

Del the Funky Homosapien chronology
Root Stimulation (2012)	Attractive Sin (2012)	Iller Than Most (2014)

Parallel Thought chronology
Acid Tab Vocab (2009)	Attractive Sin (2012)	Other Blues (2025)

Attractive Sin is the second collaborative studio album by American rapper Del the Funky Homosapien and hip-hop production duo Parallel Thought. It was released on June 19, 2012 via Parallel Thought LTD. and produced entirely by Jeff Blacker and Adam Calman.

== Critical reception ==
Professional ratings
Aggregate scores
Source	Rating
Metacritic	69/100
Review scores
Source	Rating
AllMusic	3.5/5 stars
Consequence of Sound	D
HipHopDX	3.5/5
Paste	8.3/10
PopMatters	6/10
RapReviews	8.5/10
Spectrum Culture	3.75/5 stars
Spin	6/10
Tiny Mix Tapes	2.5/5 marks

Attractive Sin was met with generally favorable reviews from music critics. At Metacritic, which assigns a normalized rating out of 100 to reviews from mainstream publications, the album received an average score of 69 based on eight reviews.

Eli Bernstein of Paste praised the album, calling it "a welcome throwback to an earlier era of underground rap". AllMusic's Fred Thomas stated: "Attractive Sin finds the collaborators stretching out liberally and sounding genuinely excited and inspired by each other". Andres Tardio of HipHopDX called it "an album that is sure to add to his discography as another solid effort from Sir DZL".

In mixed reviews, Matthew Fiander of PopMatters wrote: "Del's penchant for calling out lesser emcees, itself a deep tradition in hip-hop, slips into a bragging sameness a bit too often on Attractive Sin". Jon Hadusek of Consequence resumed: "despite Parallel Thought's strong production, Attractive Sin's failings fall on Del. He can do better". Ben Rag of Tiny Mix Tapes concluded: "Attractive Sin ultimately suffers from a lack of humor and humility (namely, pride)".

== Track listing ==
No.	Title	Length
1.	"On Mommas House"	5:27
2.	"Ownership"	2:58
3.	"Different Guidelines"	3:37
4.	"Charlie Brown"	5:41
5.	"Activated Sludge"	3:23
6.	"Apply It & See"	2:25
7.	"1520 Sedgewick"	3:15
8.	"Getto Drillin"	3:59
9.	"Blow Your Mind"	4:36
10.	"Shows Over"	3:24
11.	"Front Like Ya Know"	3:59
Total length:		42:44

Bandcamp only bonus track
No.	Title	Length
12.	"Black Dynamite"	4:10
