= Over Time (album) =

Compilation album by Hieroglyphics
- Released: March 20, 2007
- Recorded: 2007
- Genre: Alternative hip-hop
- Length: 61:17
- Label: Hieroglyphics Imperium Recordings

Hieroglyphics chronology
The Corner (2005)	Over Time (2007)

Professional ratings
Review scores
Source	Rating
AllMusic	3/5 stars
RapReviews	8/10

Over Time is the fifth compilation album released by the Oakland, California-based, underground hip-hop collective, Hieroglyphics. The album was released on March 20, 2007 by the group's own independent record label, Hieroglyphics Imperium Recordings.

== Track listing ==
1. "You Never Knew (Domino remix)" (Producer Domino) (Artists: Hieroglyphics) – 04:31
2. "Masterminds" (Producer Del tha Funkee Homosapien) (Artist: Del tha Funkee Homosapien) (featuring Tajai) – 05:44
3. "Prose Officially" (Producer Jay Biz) (Artists: Pep Love, Jay Biz) – 04:07
4. "Greed" (Producer Kool DJ EQ) (Artist: A-Plus) – 03:20
5. "Phoney Phranchise (Domino Remix)" (Producer Domino) (Artist: Del tha Funkee Homosapien) – 05:20
6. "Soundscience (Remix)" (Producer Tommy Tee), (Artists: Souls of Mischief) – 03:43
7. "It's About Time" (Producer Del tha Funkee Homosapien) (Artist: Del tha Funkee Homosapien) – 04:36
8. "The Scandle" (Producer Casual) (Artist: Casual) – 4:06
9. "Battle of the Shadow" (Producer A-Plus) (Artist: Del tha Funkee Homosapien) (featuring A-Plus) – 04:06
10. "Fight Club (Remix)"(Producer Casual) (Artist: Pep Love) – 04:28
11. "Unseen Hand" (Producer Opio) (Artists: Souls of Mischief) – 04:14
12. "If You Must (Automator Remix)" (Producer Dan the Automator) (Artist: Del tha Funkee Homosapien) – 04:08
13. "Heat" (Producer Casual) (Artists: Hieroglyphics) – 04:54
14. "Cyberpunks" (Producer Del tha Funkee Homosapien) (Artist: Del tha Funkee Homosapien) – 06:00
