= Full Circle (Hieroglyphics album) =

Studio album by Hieroglyphics
- Released: October 7, 2003
- Genre: Hip-hop
- Length: 66:01
- Label: Hieroglyphics Imperium Recordings
- Producers: Domino, Opio, A-Plus, Casual, Space Boy Boogie, Frank Friction

Hieroglyphics chronology
3rd Eye Vision (1998)	Full Circle (2003)	The Kitchen (2013)

Singles from Full Circle
- 1. "Powers That Be" Released: 2003; 2. "Make Your Move" Released: 2004

Professional ratings
Review scores
Source	Rating
AllMusic	4/5 stars
Exclaim!	favorable
Pitchfork	7.2/10

Full Circle is the second studio album by American hip-hop collective Hieroglyphics. It was released by Hieroglyphics Imperium Recordings on October 7, 2003. It peaked at number 155 on the Billboard 200 chart.

== Critical reception ==
John Bush of AllMusic gave the album 4 stars out of 5, calling it "the best record of their career."

== Track listing ==
No.	Title	Writer(s)	Length
1.	"Prelude"	D. Siguenza, P. Peacock	1:46
2.	"Fantasy Island"	O. Lindsey, D. Thompson, P. Peacock	4:28
3.	"Powers That Be"	D. Siguenza, O. Lindsey, T. Massey, T. Jones, P. Peacock	4:54
4.	"Make Your Move" (featuring Goapele)	D. Siguenza, J. Owens, P. Peacock, G. Mohlabane	4:29
5.	"Shift Shape"	D. Siguenza, J. Owens, P. Peacock, A. Carter, O. Lindsey	5:22
6.	"Classic"	D. Siguenza, T. Massey, T. Jones, P. Peacock	3:08
7.	"Chicago"	A. Carter, O. Lindsey, D. Thompson, T. Massey	2:55
8.	"Heatish"	O. Lindsey, P. Peacock, J. Owens	4:53
9.	"Halo"	O. Lindsey, D. Thompson, J. Owens, T. Jones, A. Carter, T. Massey	4:50
10.	"Love Flowin'"	O. Lindsey, J. Owens, P. Peacock, A. Carter	3:43
11.	"100,000 Indi" (featuring Abstract Rude)	J. Owens, D. Thompson, A. Pointer	3:48
12.	"Let It Roll"	D. Siguenza, T. Massey, P. Peacock	3:46
13.	"Maggie May (R.I.P. Faith)"	A. Carter, D. Thompson, O. Lindsey, T. Jones	3:47
14.	"Jingle Jangle"	A. Perez, T. Massey, J. Owens, A. Carter, P. Peacock, T. Jones	4:38
15.	"Full Circle" (featuring Goapele)	A. Carter, P. Peacock, J. Owens, O. Lindsey, G. Mohlabane	4:39
16.	"7 Sixes"	D. Siguenza, P. Peacock, T. Massey, J. Owens, O. Lindsey, T. Jones, D. Thompson, A. Carter	4:48

== Personnel ==
Credits adapted from liner notes.

- Domino – production (1, 3, 4, 5, 6, 12, 16)
- Amp Fiddler – keyboards (1, 2, 3, 8, 10), background vocals (3, 8), vibraphone (4), piano (9, 12), bassline (9)
- Opio – keyboards (2, 8, 9), production (2, 8, 9, 10)
- Toure – turntables (2)
- Merlo Podlewski – bass guitar (4, 5, 6)
- Casual – bells (5), production (11)
- A-Plus – production (7, 13, 15), turntables (15)
- Eric McFaddin – guitar (9)
- Space Boy Boogie – production (14)
- Frank Friction – co-production (14)
- Matt Kelley – engineering, editing
- Ken Lee – mastering
- James Sheehan – design
- Block – photography

== Charts ==
Chart	Peak position
US Billboard 200	155
US Heatseekers Albums (Billboard)	7
US Independent Albums (Billboard)	10
US Top R&B/Hip-Hop Albums (Billboard)	53
