= Is It Right (disambiguation) =

"Is It Right" is a 2014 Eurovision song by Elaiza

Is It Right may also refer to:

- "Is It Right", a song by Jeffrey Osborne from the album Don't Stop
- "Is It Right", a song by Useless ID
- "Is It Right", a song by Damhnait Doyle from the 2003 album Davnet
- "Is It Right?", a song by Extra Prolific from the 1994 album Like It Should Be
- "Is It Right", a song by Kristoff Krane and Eyedea from the 2008 album This Will Work For Now
