= Ice Pirates =

Ice Pirates may refer to:

== Arts, entertainment, media ==
- The Ice Pirates, a 1984 comedic U.S. sci-fi film starring Robert Ulirch and Mary Crosby
- "Ice Pirates", a 2000 song by Sunspot Jonz off the album Child Ov The Storm; see Del the Funky Homosapien discography
- The Ice Pirates, a 2010 children's novel by Chris Mould originally titled The Icy Hand; the second volume in the Something Wickedly Weird series

== Sports ==
- Lake Charles Ice Pirates (1997–2001), Lake Charles, Louisiana, USA; a professional ice hockey team in the Western Professional Hockey League
- Helena Ice Pirates (1994–1999), Helena, Montana, USA; a Junior-A ice hockey team in the America West Hockey League; predecessor to the Helena Gold Rush (1999–2000) and the Helena Bighorns (since 2001), now in the North American 3 Hockey League
- Tampa Bay Ice Pirates (1999–2000), Tampa Bay, Florida, USA; a Junior-A ice hockey team in the Southern Elite Hockey League; see List of defunct Florida sports teams
- Eispiraten Crimmitschau (German: 'Ice Pirates' Crimmitschau), Crimmitschau, Zwickau, Saxony, Germany; a professional ice hockey team

== Other uses ==
- VXE-6, an Antarctic Development Squadron of the U.S. Navy, nicknamed "Ice Pirates"

== See also ==
- Pirate (disambiguation)
- Ice (disambiguation)
