= Overtime (disambiguation) =

Overtime is the amount of time someone works beyond normal working hours.

Overtime may also refer to:

== Sports ==
- Overtime (sports), an extra period of play when the standard game time ends in a tie
  - Overtime (ice hockey)

== Music ==
- Overtime (album), a 2005 album by the Dave Holland Big Band
- Over Time (album), an album by Hieroglyphics
- "Overtime" (Ace Hood song), 2009
- "Overtime" (Level 42 song), 1991
- "Overtime", a song by Dale Bozzio on the 1988 album Riot in English
- "Overtime", a song by Willie Nelson and Lucinda Williams on the 2004 album Outlaws and Angels
- "Overtime", a 2012 song by Cash Cash
- "Overtime", a song by Chris Brown from his 2019 album Indigo
- "Overtime", a song by Jessie Ware from her 2020 album What's Your Pleasure?

== Other uses ==
- Overtime (sports network), a sports network startup cofounded by Zack Weiner and Dan Porter
- Overtime (film) aka The Dead Are Alive, a 1972 film by Italian director Armando Crispino
- Overtime (novel), a 1993 humorous fantasy novel by Tom Holt
- Overtime, a series created by YouTube group Dude Perfect in 2018
