= The Kitchen (album) =

Studio album by Hieroglyphics
- Released: July 16, 2013
- Genre: Hip-hop
- Length: 51:56
- Label: Hieroglyphics Imperium Recordings
- Producer: Sleeprockers, Del the Funky Homosapien, Gully Duckets, Opio, Unjust, A-Plus, Phesto Dee, Steven King

Hieroglyphics chronology
Full Circle (2003)	The Kitchen (2013)

Professional ratings
Review scores
Source	Rating
AllMusic	4/5 stars
The Daily Californian	favorable
HipHopDX	3.5/5 stars

The Kitchen is the third studio album by American hip-hop collective Hieroglyphics. It was released by Hieroglyphics Imperium Recordings on July 16, 2013. It peaked at number 14 on the Billboard Heatseekers Albums chart, as well as number 45 on the Top R&B/Hip-Hop Albums chart.

Music videos were created for "Gun Fever", "It's Partly Me", and "Golden".

== Critical reception ==
Ian Birnam of The Daily Californian said, "with its smooth rhymes and crunchy beats, The Kitchen is a definitive reminder of Hiero's stance in the hip-hop world."

== Track listing ==
No.	Title	Length
1.	"The Kitchen Intro"	0:33
2.	"Livin' It Up"	3:01
3.	"The Mayor"	4:00
4.	"Golden"	3:10
5.	"Gun Fever"	3:04
6.	"Indonesia"	4:26
7.	"Wshores Galore"	2:12
8.	"That Merch"	2:55
9.	"Nutrition"	1:30
10.	"Indonesia Interlude"	0:38
11.	"Highway Five"	4:39
12.	"All as Above So Below"	3:18
13.	"Nano Salt"	3:18
14.	"Immortals"	3:51
15.	"Exciting"	3:21
16.	"It's Partly Me"	4:03
17.	"Passing Fads"	3:57

== Personnel ==
Credits adapted from liner notes.

- Sleeprockers – production (1), editing, mixing
- Del the Funky Homosapien – production (2, 4)
- Gully Duckets – production (3, 5)
- Opio – production (6, 7, 9, 10, 11, 12, 13, 16)
- Unjust – production (8)
- A-Plus – production (14)
- Phesto Dee – production (15)
- Steven King – production (17)
- Ken Lee – mastering
- Spencer Groshong – artwork
- Leo Docuyanan – photography

== Charts ==
Chart	Peak position
US Heatseekers Albums (Billboard)	14
US Top R&B/Hip-Hop Albums (Billboard)	45
