= Priscilla Levac =

Canadian snowboarder

Priscilla Levac, is a Canadian professional snowboarder based out of Whistler, British Columbia.

== Career ==
After growing up in Gatineau, province of Quebec, Priscilla moved to the resort area of Whistler-Blackcomb to snowboard. She began competing professionally in 2002, and has since become known for her multiple wins in international slopestyle competitions, including a first place finish in the 2003 US Open at Stratton, and podiums in events such as the Roxy Chicken Jam, The Session at Vail, and the Australian Open. She was awarded the title "Best Female Snowboarder of the year" by Snowboarder Magazine in 2005. She had her own signature outerwear with Ride Snowboards and signature bindings with Drake.

She has also appeared in several snowboard videos, including the all-female releases by Misschief Films "As If" and "Roshambo." She was also the only female snowboarder to appear in the DC Mountain Lab Film, in the Kidsknow Production, "Love Hate" by Mikey LeBlanc, and Standard Films 2008 release, "Aesthetica".

== Current projects ==
In 2007, while she was recovering from an injury and unable to ride, Priscilla founded a snowboard apparel company, Cilla, with her mother Suzanne Levac. In 2011 Priscilla works on the launch of her new Raw Foods Coaching business The Raw Livestyle.
