= 3rd Eye Vision =

Studio album by Hieroglyphics
- Released: March 24, 1998
- Genre: Hip-hop
- Length: 70:26
- Label: Hieroglyphics Imperium
- Producers: Domino, A-Plus, Del the Funky Homosapien, Casual, Phesto, Opio, J-Biz, Toure

Hieroglyphics chronology
3rd Eye Vision (1998)	Full Circle (2003)

Singles from 3rd Eye Vision
- 1. "The Who" Released: 1997; 2. "The Last One" Released: 1998; 3. "You Never Knew" Released: 1998

3rd Eye Vision is the debut studio album by American hip-hop collective Hieroglyphics. It was released by Hieroglyphics Imperium Recordings on March 24, 1998. It peaked at number 26 on the Billboard Heatseekers Albums chart, as well as number 88 on the Top R&B/Hip-Hop Albums chart. It has sold more than 100,000 copies.

== Critical reception ==
Professional ratings
Review scores
Source	Rating
AllMusic	4/5 stars
RapReviews	9/10
The Source	3/5 stars

In 2015, Fact placed the album at number 34 on the "100 Best Indie Hip-Hop Records of All Time" list.

== Track listing ==
No.	Title	Writer(s)	Length
1.	"Intro"	D. Siguenza	1:14
2.	"You Never Knew"	A. Carter, P. Peacock, T. Jones, T. Massey, O. Lindsey, D. Thompson	4:33
3.	"All Things"	P. Peacock, O. Lindsey, D. Siguenza	3:19
4.	"Casual"	J. Owens, T. Jones	1:37
5.	"The Who"	P. Peacock, T. Jones, D. Thompson, O. Lindsey	4:29
6.	"Dune Methane"	J. Owens, O. Lindsey	4:02
7.	"Phesto"	D. Thompson	1:35
8.	"At the Helm"	T. Jones, D. Siguenza	4:18
9.	"The Last One"	J. Owens, P. Peacock	3:26
10.	"Tajai"	T. Massey, D. Siguenza	1:41
11.	"Oakland Blackouts"	T. Jones, O. Lindsey	4:31
12.	"Mics of the Roundtable"	A. Carter, O. Lindsey, T. Massey, D. Thompson	4:42
13.	"See Delight"	O. Lindsey, P. Peacock	3:24
14.	"Pep Love"	P. Peacock, J. Suarez	2:15
15.	"Off the Record"	J. Owens, A. Carter, T. Jones, T. Massey, D. Siguenza	3:21
16.	"A-Plus"	A. Carter, D. Siguenza	1:24
17.	"After Dark"	P. Peacock, D. Siguenza	4:23
18.	"Opio"	O. Lindsey	1:21
19.	"No Nuts"	T. Jones, P. Peacock, D. Siguenza	4:04
20.	"Del"	T. Jones, D. Siguenza	1:14
21.	"One Life, One Love"	T. Duncan, T. Massey, J. Owens	4:02
22.	"Miles to the Sun"	P. Peacock, T. Massey, O. Lindsey, D. Thompson, A. Carter, J. Suarez	5:39

== Personnel ==
Credits adapted from liner notes.

- Domino – production (1, 3, 8, 10, 15, 16, 17, 19, 20)
- A-Plus – production (2, 12)
- Del the Funky Homosapien – production (4, 5)
- Casual – production (6, 9)
- Phesto – production (7)
- Opio – production (11, 13, 18)
- Jeff Cleland – bass guitar (11)
- Robski – turntables (11)
- J-Biz – production (14, 22), turntables (21, 22)
- Toure – production (21)
- Matt Kelley – engineering
- Ken Lee – editing
- Brian Gardner – mastering
- Stephan Chandler – artwork, layout
- Jake Rosenberg – photography

== Charts ==
Chart	Peak position
US Heatseekers Albums (Billboard)	26
US Top R&B/Hip-Hop Albums (Billboard)	88
