= Respect Game or Expect Flames =

Studio album by Casual and J. Rawls
- Released: August 28, 2012
- Genre: Hip hop
- Length: 47:44
- Label: Nature Sounds
- Producer: J. Rawls

Casual chronology
He Still Think He Raw (2012)	Respect Game or Expect Flames (2012)	Return of the Backpack (2013)

J. Rawls chronology
The Liquid Crystal Project 3 (2012)	Respect Game or Expect Flames (2012)	The Legacy (2014)

Respect Game or Expect Flames is a collaborative studio album by rapper Casual and producer J. Rawls. It was released on Nature Sounds on August 28, 2012.

== Critical reception ==
Professional ratings
Review scores
Source	Rating
Exclaim!	favorable
Okayplayer	favorable
RapReviews	7.5/10

Mark Bozzer of Exclaim! wrote, "Smash Rockwell (Casual) weaves in and out of the funk that Rawls provides throughout the full-length, although he stumbles yet again out of the gate on the album opener." He stated that "Respect Game or Expect Flames" and "Hier-O-Dot" are the album's highlights. T. Love of Okayplayer called the album "one of the most consistently dope and balanced albums in 2012," adding that it "is a crowd pleaser regardless of geographic origin and is sure to win both artists new fans on both coasts."

== Track listing ==
No.	Title	Length
1.	"Reign" (featuring Pep Love and Allana Reign)	3:39
2.	"Respect Game or Expect Flames" (featuring Del the Funky Homosapien)	3:40
3.	"La Danse Du Fessie"	3:08
4.	"Craziest Story"	2:17
5.	"The Authority" (featuring The Mystery School)	3:42
6.	"Surely, I'm Right"	2:30
7.	"Fly" (featuring Allana Reign)	2:57
8.	"Nota Problem Part II"	2:39
9.	"Hier-O-Dot" (featuring Copywrite, Phesto, Tage, Tajai, Jakki da Motamouth, and Opio)	5:12
10.	"Aint Tryna Hear"	3:41
11.	"Find a New (Remix)" (featuring Rene Dion)	3:05
12.	"Emergency" (featuring Kurious)	2:43
13.	"Give Respect"	3:28
14.	"Upper Echelon"	3:39
15.	"We Servin' Y'all" (featuring The Liquid Crystal Project)	1:28
Total length:		47:44

== Personnel ==
Credits adapted from liner notes.

- Casual – vocals, executive production, recording
- J. Rawls – production, executive production, recording, mixing
- Pep Love – vocals (1), recording
- Allana Reign – vocals (1, 7)
- Del the Funky Homosapien – vocals (2)
- The Mystery School – vocals (5)
- Copywrite – vocals (9)
- Phesto – vocals (9)
- Tage – vocals (9)
- Tajai – vocals (9)
- Jakki da Motamouth – vocals (9)
- Opio – vocals (9)
- Rene Dion – vocals (11)
- Kurious – vocals (12)
- The Liquid Crystal Project – music (15)
- Devin Horwitz – executive production
- Storm 9000 – mixing, mastering
- Matt Wyatt – artwork
