= Both Sides of the Brain =

Studio album by Del the Funky Homosapien
- Released: April 11, 2000
- Genre: Hip-hop
- Length: 73:42
- Label: Hieroglyphics Imperium
- Producers: Del the Funky Homosapien; Casual; Domino; El-P; Prince Paul; Khaos Unique; A-Plus

Del the Funky Homosapien chronology
Future Development (1997)	Both Sides of the Brain (2000)	The Best of Del tha Funkee Homosapien: The Elektra Years (2004)

Singles from Both Sides of the Brain
- 1. "Phoney Phranchise" Released: 1999; 2. "If You Must" Released: 2000

Both Sides of the Brain is the fourth solo studio album by American hip-hop musician Del the Funky Homosapien. It was released by Hieroglyphics Imperium Recordings in 2000. It peaked at number 118 on the Billboard 200 chart.

== Critical reception ==
Professional ratings
Review scores
Source	Rating
AllMusic	4/5 stars
Robert Christgau	A−
RapReviews	6.5/10
(The New) Rolling Stone Album Guide	3.5/5 stars

Nathan Rabin of The A.V. Club gave the album a mixed review, saying that there is "much to like about the album" but also describing it as "a bit of a letdown". He describes Del's production work as "inventive" but "largely monotonous and unnecessarily repetitive" and adds, "Equally damaging is the album's lack of form and structure: Many of its tracks sound like marathon free-styling sessions no one had the heart to edit."

In 2005, Peter S. Scholtes of City Pages included it on the "Top 100 Albums of the 2000s" list.

== Track listing ==
No.	Title	Writer(s)	Producer(s)	Length
1.	"Time Is Too Expensive"	Teren Delvon Jones	Del the Funky Homosapien	4:47
2.	"If You Must"	Jones	Del the Funky Homosapien	3:45
3.	"Jaw Gymnastics" (featuring Casual)	Jones, Jonathan Owens	Casual	3:44
4.	"Pet Peeves"	Jones	Del the Funky Homosapien	7:10
5.	"Press Rewind"	Jones, Damian Siguenza	Domino	4:37
6.	"Offspring" (featuring El-P)	Jones, Jaime Meline	El-P	4:20
7.	"Style Police"	Jones	Del the Funky Homosapien	3:54
8.	"Fake as Fuck"	Jones	Del the Funky Homosapien	4:20
9.	"BM's"	Jones	Del the Funky Homosapien	4:15
10.	"Skull & Crossbones"	Jones	Del the Funky Homosapien	4:16
11.	"Soopa Feen"	Jones	Del the Funky Homosapien	5:23
12.	"Disastrous"	Jones	Del the Funky Homosapien	3:19
13.	"Signature Slogans"	Paul Edward Huston, Jones	Prince Paul	4:22
14.	"Catch All This"	Jones	Del the Funky Homosapien	4:05
15.	"Phoney Phranchise"	Jones	Del the Funky Homosapien	3:38
16.	"Proto Culture" (featuring Khaos Unique)	Jones, Jamal Mitchell	Khaos Unique	4:13
17.	"Stay on Your Toes" (featuring A-Plus)	Adam Carter, Jones	A-Plus	3:27

== Charts ==
Chart	Peak position
US Billboard 200	118
US Heatseekers Albums (Billboard)	2
US Independent Albums (Billboard)	5
US Top R&B/Hip-Hop Albums (Billboard)	63
