= Like It Should Be =

Studio album by Extra Prolific
- Released: October 25, 1994
- Genre: Hip hop
- Length: 40:36
- Label: Jive
- Producer: A-Plus, Domino, Duane "Snupe" Lee

Professional ratings
Review scores
Source	Rating
AllMusic	3/5 stars
The Source	4/5 stars

Like It Should Be is the debut album released by Hieroglyphics subgroup, Extra Prolific. The album was released on October 25, 1994 through Jive Records and was mainly produced by group member Duane "Snupe" Lee and Souls of Mischief member A-Plus, with additional production handled by the likes of Domino and Mike G among others.

After well-received efforts by other members of the Hieroglyphics crew (including Souls of Mischief's 93 'til Infinity and Casual's Fear Itself) Like It Should Be also gained positive reviews with Allmusic giving it 3 out of a possible 5 stars and calling it "quite strong and possesses a plethora of exceptional tracks". However like the other Hieroglyphics releases, the album failed to sell well and did not do well on the Billboard charts, peaking low on the R&B and Heatseekers charts. One charting single was released, "Brown Sugar", which peaked at 41 on the Rap Singles chart.

== Track listing ==
1. "Intro"- :41
2. "Brown Sugar"- 3:21
3. "In Front of the Kids"- 2:40
4. "Is It Right?"- 3:21
5. "Sweet Potato Pie"- 3:54
6. "Cash Money"- 1:27
7. "One Motion"- 2:59
8. "Never Changing"- 3:06
9. "First Sermon"- 3:27
10. "Now What"- 3:32
11. "It's Alright"- 2:44
12. "In 20 Minutes"- 3:11
13. "Go Back to School"- 3:13
14. "The Fat Outro"- 2:58
15. "Brown Sugar (Domino Remix)"- 3:12
16. "Give It Up"- 2:51

== Charts ==
Chart (1994)	Peak position
Billboard Top R&B/Hip-Hop Albums	46
Billboard Top Heatseekers	19
