= If You Must (Del the Funky Homosapien song) =

2000 single by Del the Funky Homosapien

Single by Del the Funky Homosapien

from the album Both Sides of the Brain
- Released: February 22, 2000
- Genre: Hip hop
- Length: 3:45
- Label: Hieroglyphics Imperium Recordings
- Songwriter(s): Teren Delvon Jones
- Producer(s): Del the Funky Homosapien

Del the Funky Homosapien singles chronology
"Phoney Phranchise" (1999)	"If You Must" (2000)	"Clint Eastwood" (2001)

"If You Must" is a song by American hip hop musician Del the Funky Homosapien. It was released as a single from his 2000 album, Both Sides of the Brain. The single peaked at number 27 on the Billboard Hot Rap Songs chart. The song was featured in the 2001 video game Tony Hawk's Pro Skater 3 and reappears in its remake.

== Track listing ==
12-inch edition: side A
No.	Title	Length
1.	"If You Must (LP Version)"	3:54
2.	"If You Must (Automator Remix)"	4:11
3.	"If You Must (LP Instrumental)"	3:54
4.	"If You Must (Automator Instrumental)"	4:11

12-inch edition: side B
No.	Title	Length
1.	"Fake as F**k"	4:36
2.	"Fake as F**k (Instrumental)"	4:36
3.	"It's About Time"	4:36

== Charts ==
Chart	Peak position
US Hot Rap Songs (Billboard)	27
