= Future Development =

Studio album by Del the Funky Homosapien
- Released: November 18, 1997
- Genre: Hip-hop
- Length: 61:03
- Label: Hieroglyphics Imperium
- Producers: Del the Funky Homosapien; A-Plus; Opio; Toure

Del the Funky Homosapien chronology
No Need for Alarm (1993)	Future Development (1997)	Both Sides of the Brain (2000)

Professional ratings
Review scores
Source	Rating
AllMusic	3/5 stars
RapReviews	8/10

Future Development is the third solo studio album by American hip-hop musician Del the Funky Homosapien. It was released by Hieroglyphics Imperium Recordings in 1997. It was able to achieve decent success, selling over 400,000 copies worldwide.

== Critical reception ==
Stanton Swihart of AllMusic said that "the album is less coherent than his previous two albums and less immediate-sounding without being immaterial." In a 2000 article, Charles Aaron of Spin called it "perhaps Del's finest [album]".

== Track listing ==
No.	Title	Producer(s)	Length
1.	"Lyric Lickin"	Del	4:49
2.	"Stress the World"	Del	4:44
3.	"Why Ya Want to Get Funkee..."	Del	5:17
4.	"Don't Forget the Bass"	Del	4:36
5.	"Faulty"	A-Plus	3:07
6.	"X-Files"	A-Plus	4:03
7.	"Future Development"	Del	4:28
8.	"Corner Story"	A-Plus	4:03
9.	"Love Is Worth"	Opio	4:05
10.	"Del's Nightmare"	A-Plus	5:19
11.	"Games Begin"	A-Plus	4:09
12.	"Town to Town"	Del	7:11
13.	"Checkin' Out the Rivalry" (featuring Casual)	Toure	5:20
