= Fred Warmsley production discography =

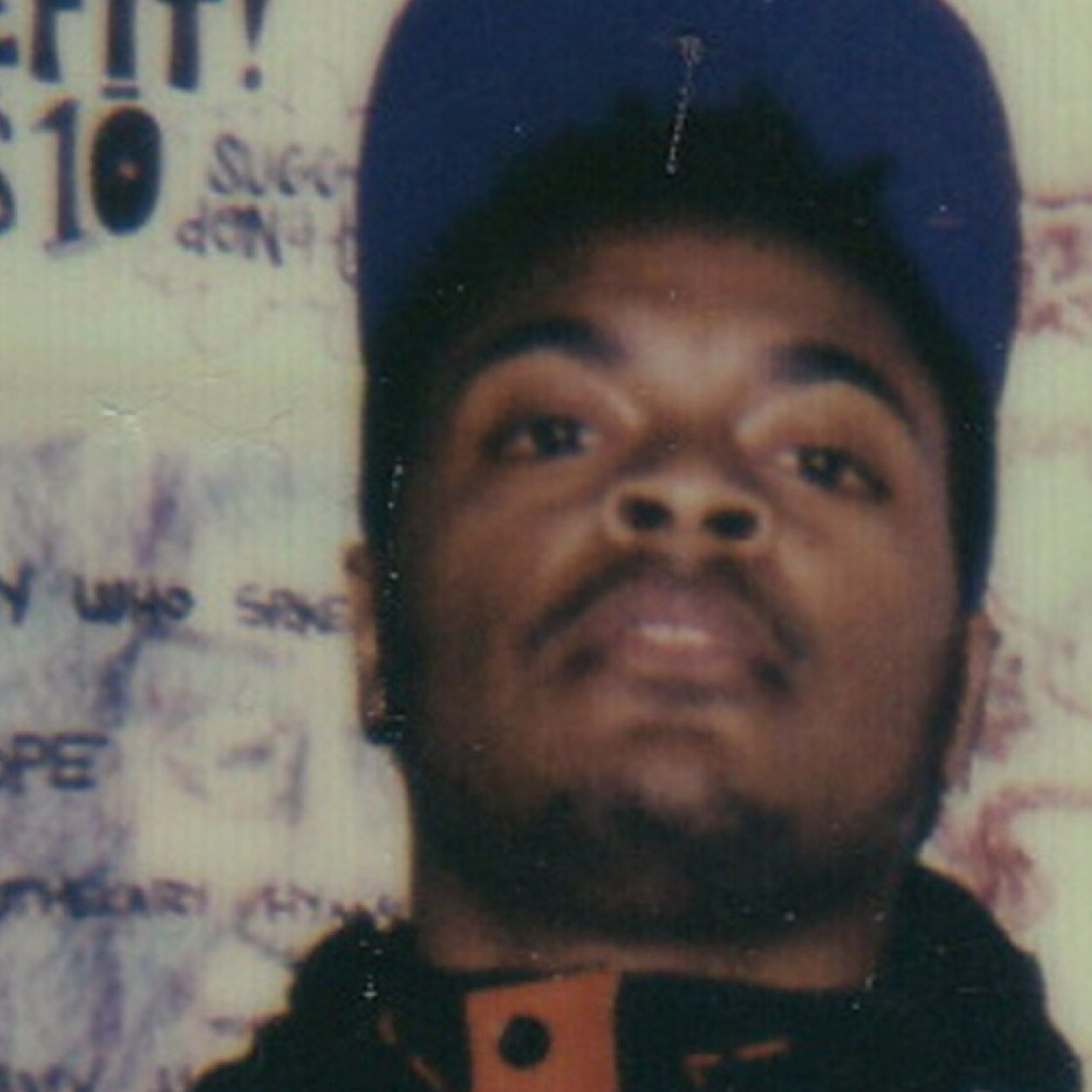
Warmsley in 2011

The following list is a discography of production by Fred Warmsley, an American record producer and disc jockey known professionally as Dedekind Cut (formerly Lee Bannon). It includes a list of songs produced, co-produced and remixed by year, artist, album and title.

== As Lee Bannon ==
=== 2008 ===
==== Sha Stimuli – Love Jones ====
- 12. "Million"

==== Big Shug – Other Side of the Game ====
- 10. "Better"

=== 2009 ===
==== The Jacka – Tear Gas ====
- 12. "What's Your Zodiac" (featuring Phil Da Agony) [as Bannon]

==== Trife Diesel – Better Late Than Never ====
- 02. "Wanna Be a Rapper"

=== 2010 ===
==== Lee Bannon – The Big Toy Box ====
- 01. "The Big Toy Box"
- 02. "Keep Slippin'"
- 03. "Tapanga"
- 04. "I"
- 05. "The Crook-Ed"
- 06. "Out the Blue"
- 07. "Baaannnon!!"
- 08. "Gone Bad"
- 09. "Whats Your Zodiac"
- 10. "The Return"
- 11. "Them"
- 12. "Aaa"
- 13. "Whats the Answer"
- 14. "Bowl of Rice"
- 15. "Arguments"
- 16. "I Be the Man"
- 17. "Fou You"
- 18. "Outro"

==== Inspectah Deck – Manifesto ====
- 06. "P.S.A."

==== Lee Bannon – The Big Toy Box 2 ====
- 01. "This Is....."
- 02. "Welcome Back"
- 03. "T.B.M."
- 04. "Fuck You"
- 05. "Again"
- 06. "Sacramento Tempo"
- 07. "A Circus Cut"
- 08. "0042"
- 09. "Try to Be"
- 10. "Cloudy"
- 11. "A Circus Cut 2"
- 12. "Toy Band"
- 13. "Yoga!"
- 14. "The Travolta"
- 15. "Weakness" (featuring Planet Asia and Gold Chain Military)
- 16. "Love Trifecta"
- 17. "A Toy Maker"
- 18. "Skip Beat"
- 19. "Jungle Math"
- 20. "Story Book"
- 21. "The Reject"
- 22. "Run or Fly"
- 23. "Situations"
- 24. "Alot"
- 25. "Tf2"
- 26. "Don't Care Watcha Say"
- 27. "A Dolla More"
- 28. "Best Dance"
- 29. "Why Must I"
- 30. "N.A.D.M."
- 31. "A Circus Cut 3"
- 32. "So Real"
- 33. "Try to Be 2"
- 34. "5 Steps"
- 35. "Toy87"
- 36. "A Circus Cut 4"
- 37. "Shoe Soul"
- 38. "Anytime"
- 39. "1 900 Promises"
- 40. "Come Up"
- 41. "Sacrafice"
- 42. "Elims"
- 43. "Its Cool"
- 44. "A Circus Cut 5"
- 45. "Devilish"
- 46. "It Was Great"

==== Willie the Kid and Lee Bannon – Never a Dull Moment ====
- 01. "Blades"
- 02. "News Flash"
- 03. "Necessary Way" (featuring La the Darkman)
- 04. "M140 Weighs a Ton"
- 05. "Bath Water Running"
- 06. "Sky Miles" (featuring Curren$y)
- 07. "Hickory Smoke"

==== Reks – In Between the Lines ====
- 04. "Understand"

==== So Fresh Clothing – Quit Hatin' on the Bay: Crushing the Block Edition ====
Disc 2

- 11. "Paper Non Stop" (featuring The Jacka and Fed-X)

=== 2011 ===
==== Roc C – Stoned Genius ====
- 09. "Fly Kicks" (featuring Termanology)
- 10. "High Club"

==== Termanology and Ea$y Money (as S.T.R.E.E.T.) – S.T.R.E.E.T. (Speakin' Thru Real Experience Every Time) ====
- 01. "Inspiration (Intro)"
- 02. "Hard Work Pays Off"
- 03. "Compared to You"
- 04. "Derelict" (featuring Artisin and Reks)
- 05. "All My Girls" (featuring Fred the Godson)
- 06. "Go Back" (featuring Ghetto)
- 07. "Soul Brothers"
- 08. "Shoe Soul"
- 09. "M.O.B."
- 10. "Rappin Bout Nothing" (featuring St. Da Squad)
- 11. "You Look Better in the Dark"
- 12. "Relax" (featuring Kali)
- 13. "Daddy"
- 14. "Value Your Life"

==== DJ Deadeye – Substance Abuse ====
- 11. "Just In Case" (featuring Rapper Big Pooh, Chaundon and O-Dash)

=== 2012 ===
==== Lee Bannon – Fantastic Plastic ====
- 01. "Fantastic Plastic" (featuring yU)
- 02. "Peaces"
- 03. "Phone Drone"
- 04. "Grey"
- 05. "Search & Destroy" (featuring Chuck Inglish)
- 06. "PG&E" (featuring Del the Funky Homosapien and Sol)
- 07. "In Color" (featuring Poor)
- 08. "Shout Out to Bannon (In Color)" (featuring Down Town James Brown)
- 09. "Lord Gnarlon" (featuring Down Town James Brown)
- 10. "Plastic Man" (featuring Chuuwee)
- 11. "Space Glide"
- 12. "The Things" (featuring Del the Funky Homosapien)
- 13. "The Noise in Color"
- 14. "A Fantastic Good Bye"
- 15. "Fantastic Knowledge"
- 16. "Something Higher" (featuring Inspectah Deck and Roc C)
- 17. "Scan"
- 18. "Out of Here"

==== Lee Bannon – Caligula Theme Music ====
- 01. "About a Blur"
- 02. "Ultra Frown"
- 03. "Kings & Stones"
- 04. "Caligula Themed Music"
- 05. "Crystle Soul"
- 06. "Form of Nothing"
- 07. "Color Calm"

==== Strong Arm Steady – Members Only ====
- 06. "One Mistake"

==== Tribe of Levi – Follow My Lead ====
- 05. "How It All Went Down"
- 06. "MVP"
- 10. "Tings to Do"
- 11. "Take It Easy"

==== Roc C and Chali 2na (as Ron Artiste') – R.I.D.S. (Riot in Da Stands) ====
- 17. "DOA Laid" (featuring Laid Law)

==== Big Shug – I.M. 4-Eva ====
- 10. "War in the Club"

==== Smoke DZA – K.O.N.Y. ====
- 02. "JFK"
- 09. "Fish Tank"

==== Pro Era – PEEP: The aPROcalypse ====
- 02. "Run or Fly" (featuring Joey Bada$$, Dirty Sanchez, CJ Fly and Capital STEEZ)
- 17. "Lawns" (featuring Super Helpful and Joey Bada$$)

=== 2013 ===
==== Reks – Revolution Cocktail ====
- 06. "Judas"

==== Joey Bada$$ – Summer Knights ====
- 02. "Hilary $wank"
- 07. "47 Goonz" (featuring Dirty Sanchez and Nyck Caution)
- 11. "Satellite" (featuring Chuck Strangers, Kirk Knight and Dessy Hinds)
- 12. "95 Til Infinity"

==== Fat Trel – SDMG ====
- 11. "Make It Clap"

==== CJ Fly – Thee Way Eye See It ====
- 03. "Ernee" (featuring Dirty Sanchez)

==== Lee Bannon – PLACE/CRUSHER ====
- 01. "PLACE/CRUSHER" (featuring Poliça, clpng and Sunni Colòn)

==== Joey Bada$$ – Summer Knights EP ====
- 01. "Hilary $wank"
- 04. "95 Til Infinity"
- 05. "My Jeep" (featuring Flatbush Zombies, The Underachievers and Chuck Strangers)

==== Scallops Hotel – Poplar Grove (or How to Rap with a Hammer) ====
- 02. "50 centaurs"

=== 2014 ===
==== Lee Bannon – Alternate/Endings ====
- 01. "Resorectah"
- 02. "NW/WB"
- 03. "Prime/Decent"
- 04. "Shoot Out the Stars and Win"
- 05. "Bent/Sequence"
- 06. "Phoebe Cates"
- 07. "216"
- 08. "Perfect/Division"
- 09. "Value 10"
- 10. "Cold/Melt"
- 11. "Readily/Available"
- 12. "Eternal/Attack"
- 13. "Alternate/Endings"

==== Lee Bannon – Never/Mind/The/Darkness/Of/It ====
- 01. "Supremekillah"
- 02. "Rellahmatic"
- 03. "547"
- 04. "H"
- 05. "Nevermindthedarknessofit"
- 06. "All U Had"
- 07. "C.C.S."

==== Smoke DZA – Dream.ZONE.Achieve ====
Act I – "Dream"

- 02. "Count Me In"

==== Lee Bannon – Joey Bada$$/Pro Era Instrumentals, Vol. 1 ====
- 01. "Untitled PE Instrumental 1"
- 02. "Satellite"
- 03. "47 Goonz"
- 04. "Hilary $wank"
- 05. "Enter the Void"
- 06. "Untitled PE Instrumental 2"
- 07. "Run or Fly"
- 08. "95 Til Infinity"
- 09. "Untitled 4"
- 10. "My Jeep"

==== Lee Bannon – Caligula Theme Music 2.7.5 ====
- 01. "2013" (featuring Matt Stoops)
- 02. "N.W.U.N."
- 03. "YG&A" (featuring Rokamouth)
- 04. "Three Bitches" (featuring Kirk Knight and Rokamouth)
- 05. "Working" (featuring Rokamouth)
- 06. "Strike"
- 07. "Working Part 2.7.5"
- 08. "Oak Park Dark"
- 09. "God Kings"
- 10. "L.I.R." (featuring Chuck Strangers)

==== R.F.C. – The Outsiders ====
- 12. "Work (Demo)" (featuring Fat Trel)

==== Remixes ====
- Neneh Cherry – "Spit Three Times" (Lee Bannon Remix)

=== 2015 ===
==== Joey Bada$$ – B4.DA.$$ ====
- 02. "Greenbax (Introlude)"

==== Lee Bannon – Cope ====
- 01. "2015"
- 02. "Cope (The Flood)"
- 03. "Song Fi"
- 04. "4 Lives"
- 05. "Friends"
- 06. "Impressions"
- 07. "The Muse"
- 08. "When We Are Sleeping"

==== Lee Bannon – Pattern of Excel ====
- 01. "Good / Swimmer"
- 02. "Artificial Stasis"
- 03. "dx2"
- 04. "Suffer Gene"
- 05. "Refoah"
- 06. "Shallowness Is the Root of All Evil"
- 07. "Paofex"
- 08. "Kanu"
- 09. "Aga"
- 10. "Inflatable²"
- 11. "DAW in the Sky for Pigs"
- 12. "disneμ girls"
- 13. "SDM"
- 14. "Memory 6"
- 15. "Towels"

==== Mick Jenkins – Wave[s] ====
- 01. "Alchemy" (Note: "Alchemy" was co-produced with THEMpeople.)

==== Wiki – Lil Me ====
- 16. "Sonatine" (featuring Slicky Boy)

== As Dedekind Cut ==
=== 2015 ===
==== Dedekind Cut – tHot eNhançeR ====
- 01. "Harbinger"
- 02. "tHot eNhançeR"
- 03. "Further (with an open mouth)"
- 04. "Necq"
- 05. "True Lover$ knot"

=== 2016 ===
==== Rabit and Dedekind Cut – R&D ====
- 01. "R&D-i"
- 02. "R&D-ii"
- 03. "R&D-iii"
- 04. "R&D-iv"

==== Dedekind Cut – LAST ====
- 01. "LAST. I"
- 02. "LAST. II"

==== Dedekind Cut – American Zen ====
- 01. "American Zen 1&2"
- 02. "Caution"
- 03. "Déjà Vu, in reverse"
- 04. "So far…So good"

==== Dedekind Cut - Successor ====
Side A

- 01. "Descend from Now"
- 02. "Instinct"
- 03. "Conversation with Angels"
- 04. "Fear in Reverse"

Side B

- 05. "Maxine"
- 06. "☯"
- 07. "5ucc3550r"
- 08. "Integra"
- 09. "46:50"

Bonus tracks

- 01. "Untitled"
- 02. "In a Room"
- 03. "Ayahuasca binary 010"

=== 2017 ===
==== Show Me the Body – Corpus I ====
- 17. "Proudboys" (featuring Dedekind Cut)
