= Domino (producer) =

American record producer and DJ (born 1970)

- Also known as: Domino
- Born: Damian Siguenza; November 9, 1970 (age 55)
- Origin: San Francisco, California, U.S.
- Genres: Hip hop
- Occupation: CEO/Producer/Manager
- Instruments: Akai MPC 2000, Akai MPC1000, Pro Tools, Numark CDX, Korg Kaoss Pad KP3, Ecler Nuo4, Arturia Analog Factory, Novation ReMOTE 25SL, Native Instruments Kontakt 2
- Years active: 1993–Present
- Label: Hieroglyphics Imperium Recordings
- Website: Domino on Myspace

Damian Siguenza (born November 9, 1970), known by his stage name Domino, is an American record producer, manager, DJ, and one of the members of the Oakland-based underground hip hop collective, Hieroglyphics.

== Biography ==
Damian Siguenza was born on November 9, 1970, in San Francisco, California; he is of Salvadoran heritage. His uncle is Herbert Siguenza. Siguenza claimed in a 2006 interview that the nickname "Domino" came from his friends in high school:

I got the name in high school. There is no meaning other than that it is associated with my first initial to my name Damian."

Domino began his music career as a rapper, but by 1989-90 had switched almost exclusively to beat making, following the purchase of a Casio FZ-10M sampler. By the time he joined the Hieroglyphics in the mid-1990s, Domino concentrated solely on beat making and production.

== Musical career ==
In 1991, Domino was living in the back room of 'The Groove Merchant' Record Store in the Bay Area honing his ear and craft with old and rare funk and soul records. He met Hieroglyphics' founder Del the Funky Homosapien through a frequent customer, Elektra Records A&R/producer Dante Ross. Del then introduced Domino to the other members of the Hieroglyphics, who admired Domino's beat making skills as much as Domino admired the Hieroglyphic's rapping skills, and Domino eventually became an integral part of the collective. Ultimately, as the various groups were signed to Elektra and Jive Records. Domino, being the oldest, became the spokesman and manager for most of the groups.

Domino is known for his combination of jazz and funk style sounds, creative sampling and extensive record knowledge. Some of his more notable tracks include "Let Em' Know and "Live and Let Live" from Souls of Mischief's first album 93 til Infinity. "After Dark" and "At The Helm" from the Hieroglyphics' first album 3rd Eye Vision and "Make Your Move" and "Powers That Be", from the Hieroglyphics' second album Full Circle. His creative use of samples and approach to using funk and jazz-based music is one of the foundations of the Hieroglyphics' sound. His production has been featured on just about every Hiero-related release on Jive and Hieroglyphics Imperium labels.

In the years (1997–2006) of being acting CEO the Hiero Imperium, Domino has gained worldwide recognition and respect in the underground hip-hop world while expanding the Hiero Imperium to include artists such as O.C., Goapele, and Beeda Weeda.

Domino continues creating music for Commercials, Television and Video games. His songs have recently been featured in the EA's Tony Hawk's Pro Skater series and his songs featured on the HBO Entourage Series.

Domino has recently been associated with Dan the Automator and Amp Fiddler. He is working on many new projects, including a solo project and Bay Area rapper Richie Cunning.

== Production Discography ==
- 1998 - 3rd Eye Vision - Hieroglyphics
- 1993 - No Need for Alarm - Del the Funky Homosapien

=== Studio albums ===
Album information
No Need for Alarm
- Artist: Del tha Funkee Homosapien
- Released: 1993
- Songs Produced by Domino: "No More Worries", "Don't Forget"
Both Sides of the Brain
- Artist: Del tha Funkee Homosapien
- Released: April 11, 2000
- Song Produced by Domino: "Press Rewind"
93 'til Infinity
- Artist: Souls of Mischief
- Released: September 6, 1993
- Songs Produced by Domino: "Let 'Em Know", "Live And Let Live", "Disseshowedo","What A Way To Go Out",
Trilogy: Conflict, Climax, Resolution
- Artist: Souls of Mischief
- Released: March 14, 2000
- Song Produced by Domino: "Interrogation"
Ascension
- Artist: Pep Love
- Released: July 24, 2001
- Songs Produced by Domino: "Act Phenom", "Different"
Power Movement
- Artist: Tajai
- Released: April 20, 2004
- Songs Produced by Domino: "Raindance", "Dedication"
Triangulation Station
- Artist: Opio
- Released: February 22, 2006
- Song Produced by Domino: "Confederate Burning"
Fear Itself
- Artist: Casual
- Released: February 1, 1994
- Songs Produced by Domino: "Intro", "Me-O-Mi-O", "That Bullshit", "Follow The Funk", "We Got It Like That", "Lose In The End",

"Thoughts Of The Thoughtful", "Be Thousand"

He Think He Raw
- Artist: Casual
- Released: September 17, 2001
- Song Produced by Domino: "Studio D"
Smash Rockwell
- Artist: Casual
- Released: September 6, 2005
- Songs Produced by Domino: "Rap Game", "Styles"
3rd Eye Vision
- Artist: Hieroglyphics
- Released: May 24, 1998
- Songs Produced by Domino: "Intro", "All Things", "At The Helm", "After Dark", "Tajai", "Off The Record", "Aplus", "No Nuts", "Del"
Full Circle
- Artist: Hieroglyphics
- Released: October 7, 2003
- Songs Produced by Domino: "Prelude", "Powers That Be", "Make Your Move", "Shift Shape", "Classic", "Let It Roll", "7 Sixes"
Montezuma's Revenge
- Artist: Souls of Mischief
- Released: December 1, 2009
- Songs Produced by Domino: "Tour Stories", "Outro"

=== Compilation albums ===
Album information
Hieroglyphics B-Sides
- Released: 1997
Hieroglyphics Oldies, Vol. II
- Released: 1998
- Song Produced by Domino: "Fear No Evil", "Can I Kill 'em?",
Over Time
- Released: March 20, 2007
