= Extra Prolific =

American hip hop group

- Origin: Oakland, California, USA
- Genres: Hip-Hop
- Years active: 1993–1998, 2020-present
- Label: Jive
- Members: Snupe; Mike G

Extra Prolific was an American alternative hip hop duo formally signed to Jive Records. The duo composed of rapper Duane "Snupe" Lee and producer/DJ Michael "Mike G" Getmore and was a subgroup of the rap collective Hieroglyphics.

Extra Prolific was the Hieroglyphics' second group to splinter from the collective after the Souls of Mischief and like them, signed a deal with Jive Records. The duo recorded their debut album Like It Should Be which was released in late in 1994. The album spawned a minor hit in "Brown Sugar". Mike G left the group while Snupe kept the Extra Prolific name and continued to release music under the name into 1998.

Snupe released a new album Like It's Supposed To Be under the Extra Prolific name in March 2020.

== Discography ==
Year	Title	Chart positions	
Year	Title	U.S. R&B	U.S. Heatseekers
1994	Like It Should Be: Released: October 25, 1994; Label: Jive	46	19
1996	2 For 15: Released: 1996; Label: Security Records	—	—
1998	Master Piece: Released: 1998; Label: Snuper Records		
2020	Like It's Supposed To Be: Released: 2020	—	—
