= Hopie =

American rapper

Hopie, née Kae Hope Ranoa, is a San Francisco Bay Area rapper and lawyer.

== Biography ==
Hopie was born in the Philippines and immigrated with her family to the United States when she was three. She turned to music as an escape, she told East Bay Express.

Hopie began writing her own music at 11 and performing in the Bay Area as a teenager. She released her first solo album, "The Diamond Dame," in 2008. She has collaborated with rappers such as Del Tha Funky Homosapien and Bambu. Urb Magazine nominated her for inclusion in their Next 1000 issue. In 2013, Hopie was included on Strength in NUMBERS, a collaborative album by producer CHOPS featuring all Asian-American rappers and singers.

Hopie is a graduate of the UC Hastings law school. She told East Bay Express that she doesn't feel like rapping and studying law conflict because "hip-hop is inherently political."
