= It Ain't Illegal Yet =

Studio album by Del the Funky Homosapien
- Released: August 5, 2010
- Genre: Hip-hop
- Length: 43:07
- Label: Funnyman
- Producer: Del the Funky Homosapien

Del the Funky Homosapien chronology
Automatik Statik (2009)	It Ain't Illegal Yet (2010)	Golden Era (2011)

It Ain't Illegal Yet is the eighth solo studio album by American hip-hop musician Del the Funky Homosapien. It was released by Funnyman Entertainment in 2010, for an unfixed rate with a minimum of $3. Special packages, including signed merchandise and chances to meet Del, were given to those who were willing to pay more for the album.

== Title ==
The title of the album is a quote from George Clinton. In an interview with SF Station, Del said: "It's a quote from George Clinton. When he said it, he was referring to thinking. You can still make your own decisions while there is time. I think a lot of people aren't doing that right now."

== Track listing ==
No.	Title	Length
1.	"Don't Stop Rappin'"	3:37
2.	"Excuse to Let Loose"	3:50
3.	"U Don't Hear Me Tho"	4:08
4.	"That Feelin"	3:48
5.	"Spittin Sawblades"	3:04
6.	"The Rhyme"	3:16
7.	"Heavy 101"	3:00
8.	"Easter Eggs"	3:36
9.	"Hiero Mind Body Soul"	4:02
10.	"Motomouf"	4:02
11.	"Violate"	3:47
