= Gate 13 (album) =

Studio album by Del the Funky Homosapien + AmpLive
- Released: 2018
- Genre: Hip-hop
- Length: 47:54
- Label: IOT
- Producer: AmpLive

Del the Funky Homosapien chronology
Iller Than Most (2014)	Gate 13 (2018)	Subatomic (2022)

Gate 13 is a collaborative studio album by American rapper Del the Funky Homosapien and record producer AmpLive. It was released on April 20, 2018 via IOT Records. Produced by AmpLive, it features guest appearances from Adult Karate, Andrea Blunt, Eligh, Goapele, James Melo, Mr. Micro, Simmi and Zyme.

== Critical reception ==
Professional ratings
Review scores
Source	Rating
HipHopDX	4.1/5
Pitchfork	7.4/10

Kyle Eustice of HipHopDX rated Gate 13 a 4.1 out of five, noting AmpLive's production, which "leans toward more traditional soul and funk-infused beats while consistently pumping out his signature deep, hard-hitting bass" and characterizes the collaboration as "an intrinsically layered, 17-track Hip Hop gumbo". Writing for Pitchfork, Phillip Mlynar rated this release a 7.4 out of ten; explaining the collaborative nature of the release, he sums up that "Del may be the MC in this duo, but Amp Live's production speaks just as loudly as the rhymes" and opining that "the album is full of inspired hip-hop production".

== Track listing ==
No.	Title	Writer(s)	Length
1.	"Attention" (Intro)	Teren Delvon Jones; Anthony Anderson; Colby Abbott	1:30
2.	"Wheel of Fortune"	Jones; Anderson	2:56
3.	"The Glow"	Jones; Anderson	4:13
4.	"Gravy Train"	Jones; Anderson	2:45
5.	"Funkrolla 3.0"	Jones; Anderson; Abbott	1:25
6.	"Run Free" (featuring Simmi)	Jones; Taylor-Simone Romero; Anderson	4:43
7.	"Help" (featuring Adult Karate and Andrea Blunt)	Jones; Maurice K.C. Maloney; Andrea Blunt; Anderson	3:40
8.	"Humble Pie"	Jones; Lana Shea; Anderson	3:35
9.	"Fly Away"	Jones; Anderson	0:38
10.	"Far Beyond" (featuring Goapele and Zyme)	Jones; Jared Magers; Anderson	3:58
11.	"Chili Sauce" (featuring James Melo and Mr. Micro)	Jones; Anderson; Grant Averill	3:02
12.	"Funkrolla 4.0"	Jones; Anderson; Abbott	0:30
13.	"Sit Ya Ass Down"	Jones; Anderson	3:32
14.	"On the Ball" (featuring Eligh)	Jones; Eli Nachowitz; Anderson	3:54
15.	"Get Some of Dis"	Jones; Anderson	3:41
16.	"Lateral Thinking"	Jones; Anderson; Abbott	3:43

== Personnel ==
- Anthony "AmpLive" Anderson – instrumentation on "Funkrolla 3.0", production
- Teren "Del the Funky Homosapien" Jones – rapping

Additional personnel

- Colby Abbott – instrumentation on "Attention (Intro)", "Funkrolla 3.0", "Funkrolla 4.0", and "Lateral Thinking"; keyboards on "The Glow", "Run Free", "Humble Pie", and "Sit Ya Ass Down"; piano on "Help"; synthesizer on "Help"; vocals on "Attention (Intro)"
- Ambrus – mixing, mastering
- George Ban-Weiss – bass guitar on "The Glow", "Gravy Train", "Humble Pie", "Far Beyond", and "Sit Ya Ass Down"
- Andrea Blunt – operatic vocals on "Help"
- Anthony Cole – artwork
- Thomas Cousins – announcing on "Attention (Intro)" and "On the Ball"
- Dirty Cello – cello on "Help"
- DJ FlipFlop – turntablism on "The Glow", "Gravy Train", "Funkrolla 3.0", "Run Free", "Sit Ya Ass Down", "On the Ball", and "Get Some of Dis"
- Jason Eckl – flute on "Run Free"
- Adult Karate – vocals on "Help"
- Eligh – vocals on "On the Ball"
- Goapele – vocals on "Far Beyond"
- Jorge Gutierrez – chorus vocals engineering on "Far Beyond"
- James Locke – vocals on "Fly Away"
- Gawain Mathews – guitar on "The Glow", "Gravy Train", "Humble Pie", "Fly Away", "Sit Ya Ass Down", and "Lateral Thinking"
- James Melo – keyboards on "Chili Sauce"
- Mr. Micro – vocals on "Chili Sauce"
- Jesse Molloy – saxophone on "Gravy Train" and "Get Some of Dis"
- Amy Pilve – vocals on "Funkrolla 4.0", introduction on "Humble Pie"
- Adam Privel – vocals on "Funkrolla 3.0" and "Funkrolla 4.0"
- Lana Shea – vocals on "Humble Pie"
- SIMMI – vocals on "Run Free" and "Sit Ya Ass Down"
- Mike Tafao – photography
- Zyme – vocals on "Far Beyond"
