= Mistadobalina =

Single by Del tha Funky Homosapien

from the album I Wish My Brother George Was Here
- Released: May 23 1992
- Studio: Remixed at Westlake Studios.
- Genre: Hip-hop
- Length: 4:00
- Label: Elektra Records
- Songwriters: Charles A. Bobbit; James Brown; George Clinton; William Earl Collins; O'Shea Jackson; Teren Delvon Jones; Fred Wesley; Bernie Worrell
- Producers: Del tha Funkee Homosapien, Boogiemen, Ice Cube

Del tha Funky Homosapien singles chronology
| "Sleepin' on My Couch" (1991) | "Mistadobalina" (1992) | "Dr. Bombay" (1992) |

"Mistadobalina" is a song by American hip hop musician Del tha Funky Homosapien. It was released as the second single from his 1991 debut album, I Wish My Brother George Was Here. The single peaked at number 6 on the Billboard Hot Rap Songs chart, as well as number 55 on the Hot R&B/Hip-Hop Songs chart. In 2011, Willy Staley of Complex placed it at number 19 on the "50 Greatest Bay Area Rap Songs" list.

== Origin ==
"The source of the lyrical name is from a song by The Monkees called 'Zilch'. Michael Nesmith, who died in 2021, revealed the origin of Mr. Bob Dobalina. 'It was the name of a department store manager in San Antonio,' Nesmith said. 'My wife Phyllis and I were shopping when the page came over the speaker and I was immediately struck by the internal rhythm of the phrase.'”

In a 2012 Rolling Stone article, Del said, "I just kind of conceptualized who Mr. Dobalina would be."

== Track listing ==
CD edition
| No. | Title | Length |
|---|---|---|
| 1. | "Mistadobalina (Radio Edit)" | 4:00 |
| 2. | "Mistadobalina (Remix)" | 3:58 |
| 3. | "Mistadobalina (Instrumental)" | 3:58 |
| 4. | "Ahonetwo, Ahonetwo (Remix)" | 3:40 |

7-inch edition: side A
| No. | Title | Length |
|---|---|---|
| 1. | "Mistadobalina (Radio Edit)" | 4:00 |

7-inch edition: side B
| No. | Title | Length |
|---|---|---|
| 1. | "Mistadobalina (LP Version)" | 4:00 |

US 12-inch edition: side A
| No. | Title | Length |
|---|---|---|
| 1. | "Mistadobalina (LP Version)" | 4:00 |
| 2. | "Mistadobalina (Remix)" | 3:58 |
| 3. | "Mistadobalina (Instrumental)" | 3:58 |

US 12-inch edition: side B
| No. | Title | Length |
|---|---|---|
| 1. | "Burnt" (featuring Hieroglyphics) | 4:42 |
| 2. | "Ahonetwo, Ahonetwo (Remix)" | 3:40 |
| 3. | "Ahonetwo, Ahonetwo (Instrumental)" | 3:40 |

European 12-inch edition: side A
| No. | Title | Length |
|---|---|---|
| 1. | "Mistadobalina (LP Version)" | 4:00 |
| 2. | "Mistadobalina (Remix)" | 3:58 |

European 12-inch edition: side B
| No. | Title | Length |
|---|---|---|
| 1. | "Mistadobalina (Instrumental)" | 3:58 |
| 2. | "Burnt" (featuring Hieroglyphics) | 4:42 |

== Charts ==
=== Weekly charts ===
| Chart (1992) | Peak position |
|---|---|
| Australia (ARIA) | 11 |
| Austria (Ö3 Austria Top 40) | 4 |
| Germany (GfK) | 9 |
| Netherlands (Dutch Top 40) | 10 |
| Netherlands (Single Top 100) | 8 |
| New Zealand (Recorded Music NZ) | 5 |
| Norway (VG-lista) | 8 |
| Sweden (Sverigetopplistan) | 9 |
| US Hot R&B Singles (Billboard) | 55 |
| US Hot Rap Singles (Billboard) | 6 |

=== Year-end charts ===
| Chart (1992) | Position |
|---|---|
| Australia (ARIA) | 96 |
| Austria (Ö3 Austria Top 40) | 21 |
| Germany (Media Control) | 50 |
| Netherlands (Single Top 100) | 76 |
| New Zealand (RIANZ) | 33 |
| Sweden (Topplistan) | 58 |
