= Golden Era (Del the Funky Homosapien album) =

Studio album by Del the Funky Homosapien
- Released: April 19, 2011
- Genre: Hip-hop
- Length: 41:54
- Label: The Council

Del the Funky Homosapien chronology
It Ain't Illegal Yet (2010)	Golden Era (2011)	Root Stimulation (2012)

Professional ratings
Aggregate scores
Source	Rating
Metacritic	76/100
Review scores
Source	Rating
AllMusic	4/5 stars
The A.V. Club	C+
Robert Christgau	(3-star Honorable Mention)
Okayplayer	89/100
Pitchfork	7.0/10
PopMatters	6/10 stars
RapReviews	7/10
Spectrum Culture	3.6/5

Golden Era is the ninth solo studio album by American hip-hop musician Del the Funky Homosapien. It was released by The Council in 2011. The CD edition comes with two bonus discs: Automatik Statik and Funk Man. It peaked at number 28 on the Billboard Heatseekers Albums chart, as well as number 65 on the Top R&B/Hip-Hop Albums chart.

== Critical reception ==
At Metacritic, which assigns a weighted average score out of 100 to reviews from mainstream critics, the album received an average score of 76% based on 8 reviews, indicating "generally favorable reviews".

Kiel Hauck of PopMatters gave the album 6 stars out of 10, saying, "Golden Era, like so much of Del's previous work, captures the feeling of a simpler yet better time in hip-hop, before the glitz and glamour, the high dollar music videos, and the painful overuse of that detestable thing called Auto-Tune." He added: "Regardless of if you were hoping for more from Del in his latest offering, Golden Era is a good summer album and a reminder of all of the things you loved about hip-hop growing up."

== Track listing ==
No.	Title	Length
1.	"Break the Bank"	3:41
2.	"Calculate"	3:24
3.	"Double Barrel"	3:53
4.	"Makes No Sense"	3:51
5.	"One Out of a Million"	3:46
6.	"Pearly Gates"	3:42
7.	"Raw"	3:40
8.	"Upside Down"	4:00
9.	"Descending"	3:13
10.	"Fallout"	3:55

Automatik Statik (CD edition bonus disc)
No.	Title	Length
1.	"DZL Funk"	3:43
2.	"Dammit"	3:22
3.	"For Those Who Know"	3:30
4.	"Weapon X Militant"	4:37
5.	"From A-to-Z"	4:01
6.	"Guaranteed"	4:06
7.	"Monkey Wrench"	4:11
8.	"I Got Whut U Need"	3:27
9.	"Make an A** of Urself"	4:13
10.	"Sheen and Glow"	5:25
11.	"Super Cool"	4:07

Funk Man (CD edition bonus disc)
No.	Title	Length
1.	"Get It Right Now!"	4:53
2.	"And They Thought That Was Hell"	5:12
3.	"Fit Like a Glove"	4:43
4.	"Go Against the Grain"	4:23
5.	"Hardcore Punks Can't Take It"	3:52
6.	"I'm Smellin' Myself"	5:06
7.	"King of Fighters"	5:42
8.	"News Alert"	4:16
9.	"Simple Satisfaction"	3:04
10.	"Sometimes I Gotta Get Stupid"	3:44
11.	"Straight from the Big Bad West Coast"	5:29
12.	"The Land of Funk"	5:14
13.	"Young Adrenaline"	4:29

== Charts ==
Chart	Peak position
US Heatseekers Albums (Billboard)	28
US Top R&B/Hip-Hop Albums (Billboard)	65
