= Automatik Statik =

Studio album by Del the Funky Homosapien
- Released: September 25, 2009
- Genre: Hip-hop
- Length: 44:51
- Label: self-released
- Producer: Del the Funky Homosapien

Del the Funky Homosapien chronology
Funk Man (The Stimulus Package) (2009)	Automatik Statik (2009)	It Ain't Illegal Yet (2010)

Automatik Statik is the seventh studio album by American hip-hop musician Del the Funky Homosapien. It was released in 2009, for an unfixed rate with a minimum of $3.

== Track listing ==
No.	Title	Length
1.	"DZL Funk"	3:43
2.	"Dammit"	3:22
3.	"For Those Who Know"	3:30
4.	"Weapon X Militant"	4:37
5.	"From A-to-Z"	4:01
6.	"Guaranteed"	4:06
7.	"Monkey Wrench"	4:11
8.	"I Got Whut U Need"	3:27
9.	"Make an A** of Urself"	4:13
10.	"Sheen and Glow"	5:25
11.	"Super Cool"	4:07
