= Eleventh Hour (Del the Funky Homosapien album) =

Studio album by Del the Funky Homosapien
- Released: March 11, 2008
- Genre: Hip-hop
- Length: 50:42
- Label: Definitive Jux
- Producers: Del the Funky Homosapien; Opio; KU; J-Zone

Del the Funky Homosapien chronology
| The Best of Del tha Funkee Homosapien: The Elektra Years (2004) | Eleventh Hour (2008) | Funk Man (The Stimulus Package) (2009) |

Singles from Eleventh Hour
- 1. "Workin' It" Released: 2008

Professional ratings
Aggregate scores
| Source | Rating |
|---|---|
| Metacritic | 69/100 |
Review scores
| Source | Rating |
| AllMusic | 3.5/5 stars |
| Alternative Press | 3/5 stars |
| The A.V. Club | B− |
| Christgau's Consumer Guide | (1-star Honorable Mention) |
| Entertainment Weekly | B+ |
| Now | 4/5 stars |
| Pitchfork | 6.8/10 |
| PopMatters | 6/10 |
| RapReviews | 7.5/10 |
| Spin | 3.5/5 stars |

Eleventh Hour is the fifth solo studio album by American hip-hop musician Del the Funky Homosapien. It was announced and partially recorded in 2004, but didn't come out until March 11, 2008, when it was released by Definitive Jux. The album is produced by Del himself with additional production from Opio, KU, and J-Zone. It debuted at number 122 on the Billboard 200 chart, selling 5,810 copies in its first week.

== Critical reception ==
At Metacritic, which assigns a weighted average score out of 100 to reviews from mainstream critics, the album received an average score of 69% based on 18 reviews, indicating "generally favorable reviews".

Simon Vozick-Levinson of Entertainment Weekly gave the album a grade of B+, saying: "Funky as ever, the Homosapien manages to evolve yet again, this time by embracing sounds of the past." Nate Patrin of Pitchfork gave the album a 6.8 out of 10, calling it "a straightforward and uncluttered record that flows surprisingly naturally for an album that's been so repeatedly delayed."

== Track listing ==
| No. | Title | Producer(s) | Length |
|---|---|---|---|
| 1. | "Raw Sewage" | Del the Funky Homosapien | 3:04 |
| 2. | "Bubble Pop" | Del the Funky Homosapien | 4:20 |
| 3. | "Back in the Chamber" | Del the Funky Homosapien | 3:29 |
| 4. | "Slam Dunk" | Del the Funky Homosapien | 2:52 |
| 5. | "Situations" | Del the Funky Homosapien | 4:20 |
| 6. | "Naked Fonk" | Opio | 4:07 |
| 7. | "Hold Your Hand" | Del the Funky Homosapien | 3:22 |
| 8. | "Foot Down" | Del the Funky Homosapien | 3:46 |
| 9. | "I'll Tell You" | Del the Funky Homosapien | 3:20 |
| 10. | "Workin' It" | Del the Funky Homosapien | 3:44 |
| 11. | "Last Hurrah" (featuring KU) | KU | 3:15 |
| 12. | "Str8t Up and Down" | Del the Funky Homosapien | 4:13 |
| 13. | "I Got You" (featuring Ladybug Mecca) | Del the Funky Homosapien | 3:46 |
| 14. | "Funkyhomosapien" | J-Zone | 3:04 |

== Charts ==
| Chart | Peak position |
|---|---|
| US Billboard 200 | 122 |
| US Heatseekers Albums (Billboard) | 1 |
| US Top R&B/Hip-Hop Albums (Billboard) | 58 |
