= Funk Man (The Stimulus Package) =

Studio album by Del the Funky Homosapien
- Released: April 7, 2009
- Genre: Hip-hop
- Length: 52:12
- Label: self-released
- Producer: Del the Funky Homosapien; Zac Hendrix

Del the Funky Homosapien chronology
Eleventh Hour (2008)	Funk Man (The Stimulus Package) (2009)	Automatik Statik (2009)

Professional ratings
Review scores
Source	Rating
Exclaim!	favorable
RapReviews.com	7.5/10

Funk Man (The Stimulus Package) is the sixth solo studio album by American hip-hop musician Del the Funky Homosapien. It was released through his Bandcamp page for free in 2009. To promote the album, Del released a video on YouTube.

== Critical reception ==
Thomas Quinlan of Exclaim! gave the album a favorable review, saying: "Despite being a free download, Funk Man has all the style and quality of a professional release, and is arguably his best work since Deltron 3030."

== Track listing ==
No.	Title	Length
1.	"Get It Right Now!"	4:53
2.	"And They Thought That Was Hell"	5:12
3.	"Fit Like a Glove"	4:43
4.	"Go Against the Grain"	4:23
5.	"Hardcore Punks Can't Take It"	3:52
6.	"I'm Smellin' Myself"	5:06
7.	"King of Fighters"	5:42
8.	"News Alert"	4:16
9.	"Simple Satisfaction"	3:04
10.	"Straight from the Big Bad West Coast"	5:29
11.	"Land of Funk"	5:14
12.	"Young Adrenaline"	4:29
13.	"Sometimes I Gotta Get Stupid"	3:44
