= DC Mountain Lab =

Coordinates: 40°45′18.75″N 111°32′18.56″W

The DC Mountain Lab was a private snowboard park in Park City, Utah, known as a research and development center. As of 2011, the property is being put up for sale. The property is taken up mostly by the snowboard park, but there is also a house there. It was owned and operated by DC Shoes president and co-founder Ken Block. The Lab has its own snowcat for building jumps and grooming the park. It also has 8 snowmobiles and dirt bikes. The Mountain Lab was the location of the snowboard video MTN. Lab and MTN. Lab 1.5. It also serves as a second home for DC co-owner and founder Ken Block and his family.

== Sources ==
All information regarding the Mountain Lab was taken from the video MTN. Lab, and from http://www.skiparkcity.net. and https://web.archive.org/web/20100728205625/http://www.arkademag.com/en/categoryblog/278-rip-dc-mountain-lab.html
