= Parallel Uni-Verses =

Studio album by Del the Funky Homosapien and Tame One
- Released: October 13, 2009
- Genre: Hip hop
- Length: 48:16
- Label: Gold Dust Media
- Producer: Parallel Thought

Singles from Parallel Uni-Verses
- 1. "Flashback" Released: September 15, 2009

Professional ratings
Aggregate scores
Source	Rating
Metacritic	73/100
Review scores
Source	Rating
AllMusic	3.5/5 stars
HipHopDX	3.5/5
PopMatters	6/10 stars
Potholes in My Blog	3.5/5 stars
RapReviews.com	8.5/10
Spin	7/10 stars
XLR8R	favorable

Parallel Uni-Verses is a collaborative studio album by Del the Funky Homosapien and Tame One. It was released by Gold Dust Media in 2009. The album was entirely produced by Parallel Thought. A music video was created for "Flashback".

== Production ==
Del the Funky Homosapien and Tame One recorded their vocals in their respective studio spots. The two and Parallel Thought made the entire album by trading beats, scratches, verses, and hooks over the internet. It took a month to finish the album.

== Critical reception ==
At Metacritic, which assigns a weighted average score out of 100 to reviews from mainstream critics, the album received an average score of 73% based on 6 reviews, indicating "generally favorable reviews".

David Jeffries of AllMusic gave the album 3.5 stars out of 5, calling it "an attractively familiar and nostalgic album, one that brings reminders of the informal collaborations found on early Lyricist Lounge or Def Jux compilations." He added: "Songs are allowed as much time as they need, but the album as a whole is economical and right-sized at 11 tracks."

== Track listing ==
No.	Title	Length
1.	"Intro (Magic)"	2:50
2.	"Keep It Up"	4:17
3.	"Flashback"	5:28
4.	"The Franchise"	4:59
5.	"Specifics"	3:10
6.	"Before This"	4:21
7.	"We Taking Over"	3:51
8.	"Life Sucks"	4:16
9.	"Teddy"	3:09
10.	"Special"	5:51
11.	"Gaining Ground"	6:01

iTunes edition bonus track
No.	Title	Length
12.	"Cheap Thrills"	3:27
