= Iller Than Most =

Studio album by Del the Funky Homosapien
- Released: January 1, 2014
- Genre: Hip-hop
- Length: 34:19
- Language: English
- Producer: Del the Funky Homosapien

Del the Funky Homosapien chronology
Root Stimluation (2012)	Iller Than Most (2014)	Gate 13 (2018)

Iller Than Most is the eleventh studio album by American hip-hop artist Del the Funky Homosapien, released on January 1, 2014. The release was a surprise album made free for streaming on SoundCloud and has received positive reviews from critics.

== Reception ==
Duncan Quinlan of Exclaim! rated this album an eight out of 10, noting that the lyrics are more superficial and playful than Del's work with Deltron 3030, with a variety of moods and a "flow is loose and fun". Nate Patrin of Pitchfork rated Iller Than Most a 7.4 out of 10, characterizing it as "off-the-hinges ridiculous" and opining that "Del's production style alone is worth the price of admission". Spin's Brandon Soderberg gave this album a six out of 10, calling it stronger than the Deltron 3030 work, writing that Del "sounds free here". In Consequence of Sound, Kristofer Lenz rated Iller a C−, noting that Del has a "flair for dramatic, tongue-twisting verses that can alternate between nonsense, mythology, and vicious insults" and that some tracks are standouts, but although he was "stretching both his producing and lyrical wings", Lenz complains that this is "a consistent and fun record that, unfortunately, lacks a single likely to break into the cultural landscape of the ’10s".

== Track listing ==
1. "Leader" – 3:20
2. "Boogieman" – 3:30
3. "Delta Time" – 2:49
4. "Mental Fitness" – 3:10
5. "Bitin' Ain't Samplin'" – 2:59
6. "Robust" – 3:24
7. "Militant" – 2:43
8. "Wreckin' the Upside" – 3:48
9. "10 Paces" – 2:36
10. "Grand Royal" – 3:13
11. "Land of Immediate Rap Hits" – 2:47

== See also ==
- List of 2014 albums
