= I Wish My Brother George Was Here =

Studio album by Del the Funky Homosapien
- Released: October 22, 1991
- Genre: Hip-hop
- Length: 48:27
- Label: Elektra
- Producers: Del; Boogiemen; Ice Cube

Del the Funky Homosapien chronology
I Wish My Brother George Was Here (1991)	No Need for Alarm (1993)

Singles from I Wish My Brother George Was Here
- 1. "Sleepin' on My Couch" Released: 1991; 2. "Mistadobalina" Released: 1991; 3. "Dr. Bombay" Released: 1992

I Wish My Brother George Was Here is the debut album by American hip-hop musician Del the Funky Homosapien. It was released by Elektra Records in 1991. The album was produced by Del, Boogiemen, and Ice Cube. It peaked at number 24 on the Billboard Heatseekers Albums chart, as well as number 48 on the Top R&B/Hip-Hop Albums chart.

It has been incorrectly assumed that the title of the album is a reference to George Clinton. The title actually refers to a quote from a Looney Tunes short film, which is in turn a reference to Liberace's catchphrase, which he would say on his television show whenever his brother George did not appear.

== Critical reception ==
Professional ratings
Review scores
Source	Rating
AllMusic	4.5/5 stars
Robert Christgau	(3-star Honorable Mention)
MusicHound R&B: The Essential Album Guide	4.5/5 stars
RapReviews	9/10
Record Collector	4/5 stars
(The New) Rolling Stone Album Guide	4/5 stars
The Virgin Encyclopedia of Nineties Music	4/5 stars

The Washington Post wrote that "Del flows with fresh flavor, combining free-style abstract and street-smart rhymes." Newsday concluded that "the beats are a little harder than the standard daisy-age record, and Del delivers his raps with clarity and vigor."

Fred Thomas of AllMusic said that "[Del has] clearly been writing his own rules since the beginning, and the lucid dreaming and everyday observations of I Wish My Brother George Was Here are the first and some of the best examples of this, and how wonderful the results can be."

== Track listing ==
No.	Title	Length
1.	"What Is a Booty"	3:53
2.	"Mistadobalina"	4:17
3.	"The Wacky World of Rapid Transit"	3:17
4.	"Pissin' on Your Steps"	3:29
5.	"Dark Skin Girls"	4:28
6.	"Money for Sex"	3:52
7.	"Ahonetwo, Ahonetwo"	2:46
8.	"Prelude"	0:21
9.	"Dr. Bombay"	4:37
10.	"Sunny Meadowz"	4:26
11.	"Sleepin' on My Couch"	3:18
12.	"Hoodz Come in Dozens"	3:48
13.	"Same Ol' Thing"	4:20
14.	"Ya Lil' Crumbsnatchers"	1:30

== Charts ==
Chart	Peak position
Australian Albums (ARIA)	151
US Heatseekers Albums (Billboard)	24
US Top R&B/Hip-Hop Albums (Billboard)	48
