= No Need for Alarm =

Studio album by Del the Funky Homosapien
- Released: November 23, 1993
- Studios: Hyde Street Studios (San Francisco, CA); Chung King House of Metal (New York, NY)
- Genre: Alternative hip-hop
- Length: 53:51
- Label: Elektra
- Producers: Del the Funky Homosapien; Domino; Casual; Stimulated Dummies; A-Plus; Jay-Biz; Snupe

Del the Funky Homosapien chronology
I Wish My Brother George Was Here (1991)	No Need for Alarm (1993)	Future Development (1997)

Singles from No Need for Alarm
- 1. "Catch a Bad One" Released: 1993; 2. "Wrong Place" Released: 1994

No Need for Alarm is the second solo studio album by American hip-hop musician Del the Funky Homosapien. It was released in 1993 through Elektra Records. The recording sessions took place at Hyde Street Studios in San Francisco and at Chung King House of Metal in New York City. The album spawned the two singles, "Catch a Bad One" and "Wrong Place". The album was produced by Del, A-Plus, Casual, Domino, Jay-Biz, Snupe, and Stimulated Dummies.

The album peaked at number 125 on the Billboard 200 chart.

== Critical reception ==
Professional ratings
Review scores
Source	Rating
AllMusic	3/5 stars
Entertainment Weekly	A−
RapReviews	8/10
Record Collector	3/5 stars
(The New) Rolling Stone Album Guide	4/5 stars
The Source	4/5 stars

Nathan Rabin of AllMusic called the album "a challenging, unique, and uncompromising follow-up, one well worth picking up for anyone interested in either the evolution of West Coast hip-hop or just the evolution of one of its most talented, eccentric, and gifted artists".

== Track listing ==
No.	Title	Producer(s)	Length
1.	"You're in Shambles"	Snupe	3:27
2.	"Catch a Bad One"	Casual	3:47
3.	"Wack M.C.'s"	Del the Funky Homosapien	3:36
4.	"No Need for Alarm"	Domino	3:28
5.	"Boo Boo Heads"	SD50's	4:37
6.	"Treats for the Kiddies"	SD50's	3:59
7.	"Worldwide"	Casual	3:23
8.	"No More Worries"	Domino	3:27
9.	"Wrong Place"	Del the Funky Homosapien	4:37
10.	"In and Out"	Del the Funky Homosapien	3:44
11.	"Don't Forget"	Domino	4:38
12.	"Miles to Go"	Jay-Biz	3:08
13.	"Check It Ooout"	Del the Funky Homosapien	5:09
14.	"Thank Youse"	A-Plus	3:07
Total length:			54:07

== Personnel ==
- Teren Delvon Jones – vocals, producer (tracks: 3, 9, 10, 13)
- Unicron – vocals (track 7)
- Adam "A-Plus" Carter – vocals (track 8), turntables (tracks: 5, 7, 11, 14), producer (track 14)
- Jon "Casual" Owens – vocals (track 8), producer (tracks: 2, 7)
- Duane 'Snupe' Lee – vocals (track 8), producer (track 1)
- Toure Batiste Duncan – turntables (track 1)
- Jamie "Jay-Biz" Suarez – turntables (tracks: 12, 13), production (track 12)
- Damian "Domino" Siguenza – producer (tracks: 4, 8, 11)
- Stimulated Dummies – producers (tracks: 5, 6)
- Matt Kelley – engineering (tracks: 1–4, 7–14)
- John Gamble – engineering (tracks: 5, 6)
- Tim Latham – mixing
- Ross Yeo – assistant engineering
- Adam Cudzin – assistant mixing
- Joe Thomas – assistant mixing
- Brian "Big Bass" Gardner – mastering
- Scott Idleman – design
- Carl Posey – photography

== Charts ==
Chart (1993)	Peak position
US Billboard 200	125
US Top R&B/Hip-Hop Albums (Billboard)	27
US Heatseekers Albums (Billboard)	1
