= Casual (rapper) =

American rapper

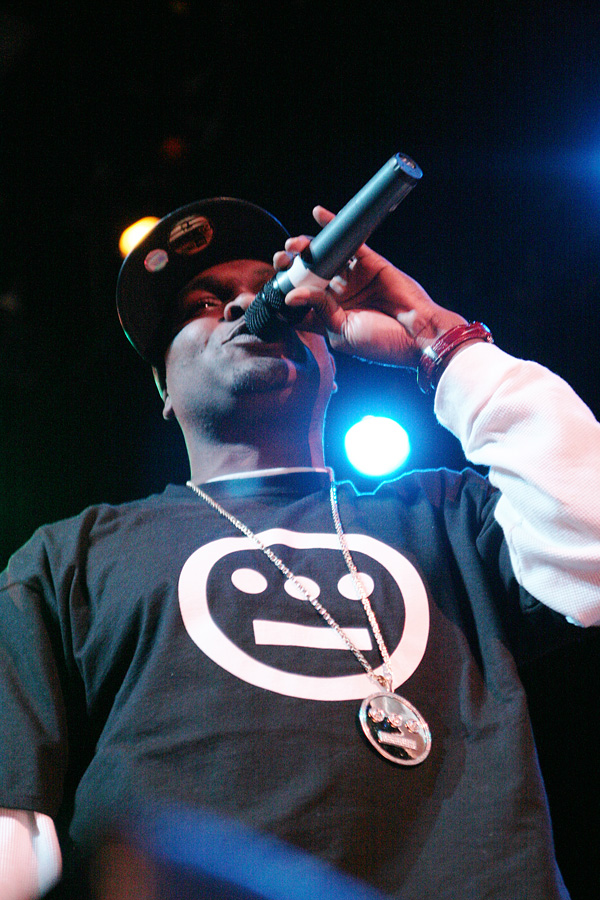
- Casual performing in 2006

Background information
- Born: Jon Owens; December 19, 1973 (age 52)
- Origin: Oakland, California, United States
- Genre: Hip-hop
- Occupations: Rapper; producer
- Instrument: Vocals
- Years active: 1992–present
- Website: casual1.bandcamp.com

Jonathan Owens (born December 19, 1973), known by his stage name Casual, is an American rapper, producer, and one of the founding members of the alternative hip-hop collective Hieroglyphics. He also reads and has been studying Egyptian Hieroglyphics for many years, makes videos on the subject on his YouTube channel Smash Rockwell as well writing about it on his blog Rap God. As a rapper Casual initially became known for his freestyle battle rhymes in the Bay Area hip-hop scene and later developing into a solo artist. He is known for diverse lyrics, a complex multisyllabic East Coast influenced flow but with a distinctive Oakland accent. Casual's debut album Fear Itself released on Jive records in 1994 when he was 20 years old, garnering both critical and commercial success. Along with Del the Funkee Homosapien Casual went on to become one of the most prominent and recognizable faces of the Hieroglyphics crew, releasing three albums all on the Hieroglyphics crew's own label, Hiero Imperium. He has released thirteen solo albums as of 2023.

== Biography ==
After high-profile appearances on Del tha Funky Homosapien and Souls of Mischief albums, in 1994 Casual released Fear Itself. The album was the second-highest charting album in Hieroglyphics' history. Casual followed a typical verse-chorus-verse structure but stood out with his ferocious but playful battle lyrics. Casual has been acclaimed for "wielding his metaphors and sinewy delivery with lethal grace"

After the release of Fear Itself, Casual (as well as fellow Hieroglyphics members Souls of Mischief) was dropped from Jive Records. Casual documents the experience in the book, Hip Hop in America: A Regional Guide: Volume 1: East Coast and West Coast:

It came about from us getting dropped from major labels, and instead of folding and succumbing to defeat, we hit the ground running. We took what we had and ran with it, we landscaped and we built something. We had to be resourceful, creative, and clever to gain our niche but now...it's been 10 years since we've busted out independent.

In 1994, Casual was involved in a high-profile battle with rapper Saafir. The beef originally started when Saafir appeared on Casual's debut album, and Casual did not appear on Saafir's. This ignited the infamous "Hiero vs Hobo Junction" battle, which involved some controversy when rumors surfaced that Saafir was using pre-written raps as opposed to Casual and Hieroglyphics expected freestyling. Despite this, it is regarded as an influential battle in underground hip-hop's history.

Casual has expressed, much like the rest of the Hieroglyphics crew the importance of competition in hip-hop, stating "I think that MCing should be a competitive thing, almost like a sport. The only way an MC can keep polishing and sharpening his skills is to test them against the competition and the up and coming young bloods."

== Discography ==
=== Albums ===
- Fear Itself (1994) No. 108 Billboard 200
- Meanwhile... (1997)
- He Think He Raw (2001)
- Truck Driver (2004)
- Smash Rockwell (2005)
- The Champion (2007)
- The Hierophant (2011)
- He Think He #Rapgod (2011)
- He Still Think He Raw (with DJ.Fresh) (2012)
- Respect Game or Expect Flames (2012) (with J. Rawls)
- Return Of The Backpack (2013)
- Fear Itself (Instrumentals) (2014)
- Mystery School (with L.B. Select, Izrell, Shark Sinatra, as The School System) (2014)
- Neaux Mursi (with Phat Kat & Unjust, as Ron Jon Bovi) (2016)
- Big Head Science (2020)
- The Art Of Reanimation (with Dead Perry) (2022)
- Fight Over Egypt (2024)
- Black Magic (2026)

=== EPs ===
- Santa Claus (2013)
- Demo Sessions (2019)
- Starduster (with Albert Jenkins) (2024)

=== Singles ===
- "That's How It Is" (1993)
- "I Didn't Mean To" (1993)
- "Me-O-Mi-O" (1994)
- "VIP" (1999)
- "Blind Date" (2001)
- "Same O.G." (2001)
- "We Don't Get Down Like That" (2002)
- "My Whole Intent" (2004) (with Fat Jack)
- "Rap Game" b/w "Things I Need" (2004)
- "Say That Then" b/w "Oaktown (Remix)" (2005)
- "Rock My Shit" (2010) (with DJ.Fresh)
- "101% Music" (2010)
- “Tears” (2012) (with DJ.Fresh)
- "Doing Me Wrong" ft. Sally Green (2020) (produced by Style MiSia)
- “The Win (The Superior Mix)” (2021)
- ”Black Egypt” (2021)
- “Raw” (2022) (with Dead Perry)
- ”Never Say It To Us (Remix) (2022) (with Dead Perry)
- “White Crown (Part 2)” (2025) (with Dead Perry, Planet Asia, DJ Eclipse)
- “Burnin & Learnin” (2026) (with Dead Perry, Suave-Ski)
- “Fish Head Soup” ft. Asun Eastwood, Daniel Son (2026) (with Jesse Green Beats)
- “Capital” (2026) (with Split Sphere: Moka Only, Prevail)

=== Guest appearances ===
- Souls of Mischief – "Limitations" from 93 'til Infinity (1993)
- Del the Funky Homosapien – "No More Worries" from No Need for Alarm (1993)
- Extra Prolific – "Cash Money" from Like It Should Be (1994)
- Kurious – "What's the Real" from A Constipated Monkey (1994)
- Kool DJ EQ – "Three Emcees" (1997)
- Del the Funky Homosapien – "Checkin Out the Rivalry" from Future Development (1997)
- Everlast – "Funky Beat" from Whitey Ford Sings the Blues (1998)
- Soul Coughing – "Needle to the Bar" from El Oso (1999)
- Del the Funky Homosapien – "Jaw Gymnastics" from Both Sides of the Brain (2000)
- T.W.D.Y. – "No Win Situation" from Lead the Way (2000)
- Edo G – "Big Business" from The Truth Hurts (2000)
- Virtuoso – "All We Know" from World War One: The Voice of Reason (2001)
- INXS – "Tight (Dan the Automator Remix)" from The Best of INXS (2002)
- Aceyalone – "Let Me Hear Sum'n" from Love & Hate (2003)
- Rasco – "San Fran to the Town" from Escape from Alcatraz (2003)
- Goapele – "The Daze" from Even Closer (2004)
- Handsome Boy Modeling School – "It's Like That" from White People (2004)
- Tajai – "Fashion Fetish" from Power Movement (2004)
- Lyrics Born – "Callin' Out Remix" from Same !@$ Different Day (2005)
- Swollen Members – "Torture" from Black Magic (2006)
- Knobody – "Champion" from Tha Clean-Up (2007)
- Dilated Peoples – "Hot and Cold (Remix)" from The Release Party (2007)
- Sean Price – "Connect 4" from Master P (2007)
- Prince Ali – "The Majors" from Curb Side Service (2007)
- The Mighty Underdogs – "Laughing at You" from Droppin' Science Fiction (2008)
- Mochipet – "Mr. Malase" from Microphonepet (2008)
- Jake One – "Feelin' My Shit" from White Van Music (2008)
- Virtuoso – "No Fear" from The Final Conflict (2010)
- Pro the Leader and Dopestyle – "Triple Threat" and "Money Off Rap" from Hip Hop Depression (2010)
- Myka 9 – "Oh Yeah... Alright" from Mykology (2011)
- Zion I & The Grouch – "Plead the Fifth" from Heroes in the Healing of the Nation (2011)
- J. Rawls – "Find a New" from The Hip-Hop Affect (2011)
- DJ Q-Fingaz – "Watch I Spit" from Qllection (2012)
- Copywrite – Golden State (of Mind) from God Save the King (2012)
- First Light – "Valley of the Kings" and "Lighters" from Fallacy Fantasy (2013)
- Cannibal Ox – "Think Differently" from Gotham (2013)
- Deltron 3030 – "What Is This Loneliness" from Event 2 (2013)
- Planet Asia & Tzarizm – "Via Satellite" from Via Satellite (2014)
- The Funk Junkie – "You & Me" from Moondirt (2017)
- ReauBeau – "On Fire" (2020)
- K-Rec – "Sunshine Promises" (2026)
- Believe – "B&C" (2026)
- Jaykin & Jesse Green Beats – "Novocaine" (2026)

== Chart history ==
=== Albums ===
Year	Album	Billboard 200
2012	Respect Game or Expect Flames	
2005	Smash Rockwell	
2001	He Think He Raw	
1997	Meanwhile	
1994	Fear Itself	108

=== Singles ===
Year	Song	Hot Rap Singles	Album
1999	"VIP"	43	
1994	"I Didn't Mean To" Certified Gold US	34	Fear Itself
1993	"That's How It Is"	22	Fear Itself
