= Hieroglyphics (group) =

American hip-hop collective

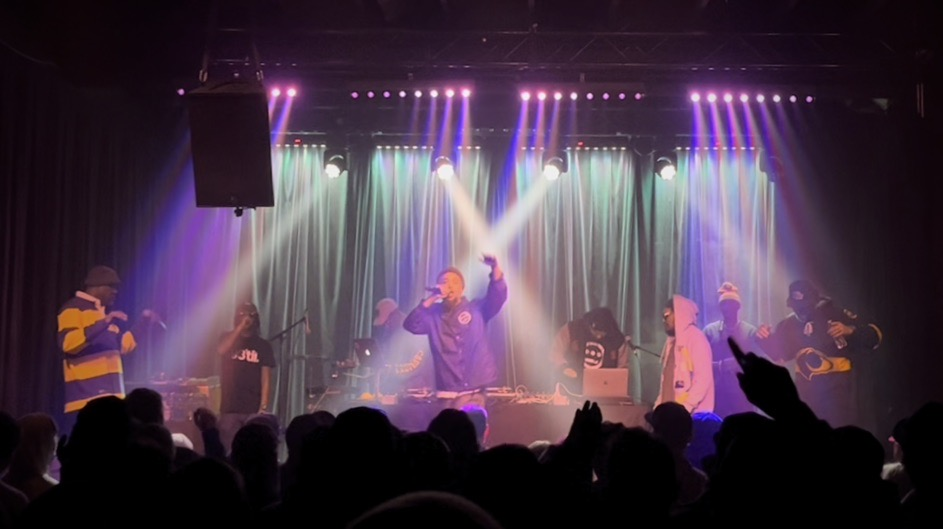
- Performing in 2025

Background information
- Also known as: Hieroglyphics Crew, Hiero
- Origin: Oakland, California, U.S.
- Genre: Hip-hop
- Years active: 1991–present
- Label: Hieroglyphics Imperium
- Members: Casual; Del the Funky Homosapien; Domino; DJ Toure; Pep Love; A-Plus; Opio; Phesto; Tajai
- Past members: Snupe; Mike G; Jay-Biz
- Website: hieroglyphics.com

Hieroglyphics, also known as the Hieroglyphics Crew and Hiero, is an American underground hip-hop collective based in Oakland, California. The group includes founder Del the Funky Homosapien, fellow rappers Casual, Pep Love, and all four members of the group Souls of Mischief—Phesto, A-Plus, Opio, and Tajai—as well as DJ Toure and producer/manager Domino.

Since their inception, Hieroglyphics have found a following largely through their members, podcasts ("Hierocasts"), and promotion through their website.

The collective uses a three-eyed, straight-lipped face logo that figures prominently on their albums, website, stickers, and clothing.

== History ==
As a collective, the Hieroglyphics have released four studio albums: 3rd Eye Vision in 1998, Full Circle in 2003, The Kitchen in 2013, and "All Said And Done" in 2026

In 2005, the collective released a live DVD and accompanying CD of the Hiero's 2003 Full Circle Tour.

The collective has also released five compilation albums: Hiero B-Sides and Hiero Oldies Vol. I in 1997, Hiero Oldies Vol. II in 1998, The Building in 2004, The Corner in 2005, and most recently, Over Time, in March 2007.

Individual members of the collective have also released albums of their own, either through solo projects or outside group projects.

== Logo ==
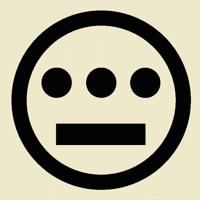
Group logo

The collective's third eye logo is the Mayan numeral for 8. Created by Del the Funky Homosapien, the son of an abstract artist, it has been used to promote the collective on their album covers, website, stickers, clothing, and other promotional materials.

In a 2000 interview with SF Weekly, Del commented:

When I invented that symbol, I never thought it would get this big. I've seen about 20 people with that tattoo. I saw a comic book -- like Clerks or something -- and one of the fools in there had a Hiero shirt on. I saw a Redman and Method Man video, and there's somebody in the crowd with a Hiero shirt on. I think slowly but surely people are starting to pay attention to us.

The Clerks comic in question was drawn by underground comic artist Jim Mahfood who has worked various rap and hip-hop items into his work over his career. In an interview with halftimeonline.net in 2004, Mahfood mentioned Del and the Hieroglyphics by name:

Working in comics, especially the way I do, is totally comparable to an underground emcee or rap crew because you can actually make a living off of it without selling out or compromising your vision. Some of my heroes are Del The Funkee Homosapien from the Hieroglyphics crew, Jurassic 5, or my homeboy Z-Trip are all people who have developed a following for doing something really specific.

== Discography ==
=== Studio albums ===
Year	Album	Peak chart positions		
Year	Album	U.S.	U.S. R&B	U.S. Heat
1998	3rd Eye Vision: Released: March 24, 1998; Label: Hieroglyphics Imperium	—N/a	88	26
2003	Full Circle: Released: October 7, 2003; Label: Hieroglyphics Imperium	155	53	7
2013	The Kitchen: Released: July 16, 2013; Label: Hieroglyphics Imperium	—N/a	45	14
2026	All Said and Done: Released: September 3, 2026; Label: Hieroglyphics Imperium	—N/a	—N/a	—N/a

=== Live albums ===
Year	Album
2005	Full Circle Tour: Released: April 19, 2005

=== Compilation albums ===
Year	Album
1996	Hiero Oldies Vol. I: Format: Cassette, CD (2001 reissue)
1997	Hiero B Sides: Format: Cassette
1997	Live.97: Format: Cassette
1998	Hiero Oldies Vol. II: Released: June 29; Format: Cassette, CD (2001 reissue)
2002	Hiero Classix Vol.1: Released: June 29; Format: CD
2004	The Building: Format: CD
2005	The Corner: Released: September 20
2007	Over Time: Released: March 20; Format: CD

=== Singles ===
Year	Song	Album
1997	"The Who" / "After Dark"	3rd Eye Vision
1998	"The Last One"	3rd Eye Vision
1999	"You Never Knew"	3rd Eye Vision
2002	"Hydra, G.U.O.M.D, Think Again"	One Big Trip
2003	"Powers That Be"	Full Circle
2003	"Make Your Move" (featuring Goapele)	Full Circle
2013	"Gun Fever"	The Kitchen
2026	"Drum Talk"	All Said and Done

=== As featured artist ===
Year	Song	Album
2012	"40 & Hiero" (E-40 featuring Hieroglyphics)	The Block Brochure: Welcome to the Soil 3
