= Hieroglyphics Imperium Recordings =

- Founded: 1995
- Founder: Hieroglyphics
- Genre: Hip-hop
- Country of origin: U.S.
- Location: Oakland, California
- Official website: www.hieroglyphics.com

Hieroglyphics Imperium Recordings is an Oakland, California-based, independent hip-hop record label founded and owned by underground hip-hop collective, the Hieroglyphics. The label was created by the collective in 1995 to publish and market the collective's, and individual member, releases, as well as releases from other, affiliated artist's that major labels would deem not commercial enough for mass distribution.

== History ==
The label's roster features the Hieroglyphics entire catalog, as well as that of Hieroglyphics crew/collective members such as the Souls of Mischief, Del tha Funkee Homosapien, Casual, Pep Love, Domino. Hieroglyphics Imperium has released music from other respected hip-hop artists like O.C., Prince Ali, Knobody and Encore. The label has also helped to distribute projects for other labels such as "Even Closer" by soul singer Goapele on her independent imprint Skyblaze Records and "One Big Trip" on Decon.

== See also ==
- List of record labels
- Underground hip-hop
