= The Coup discography =

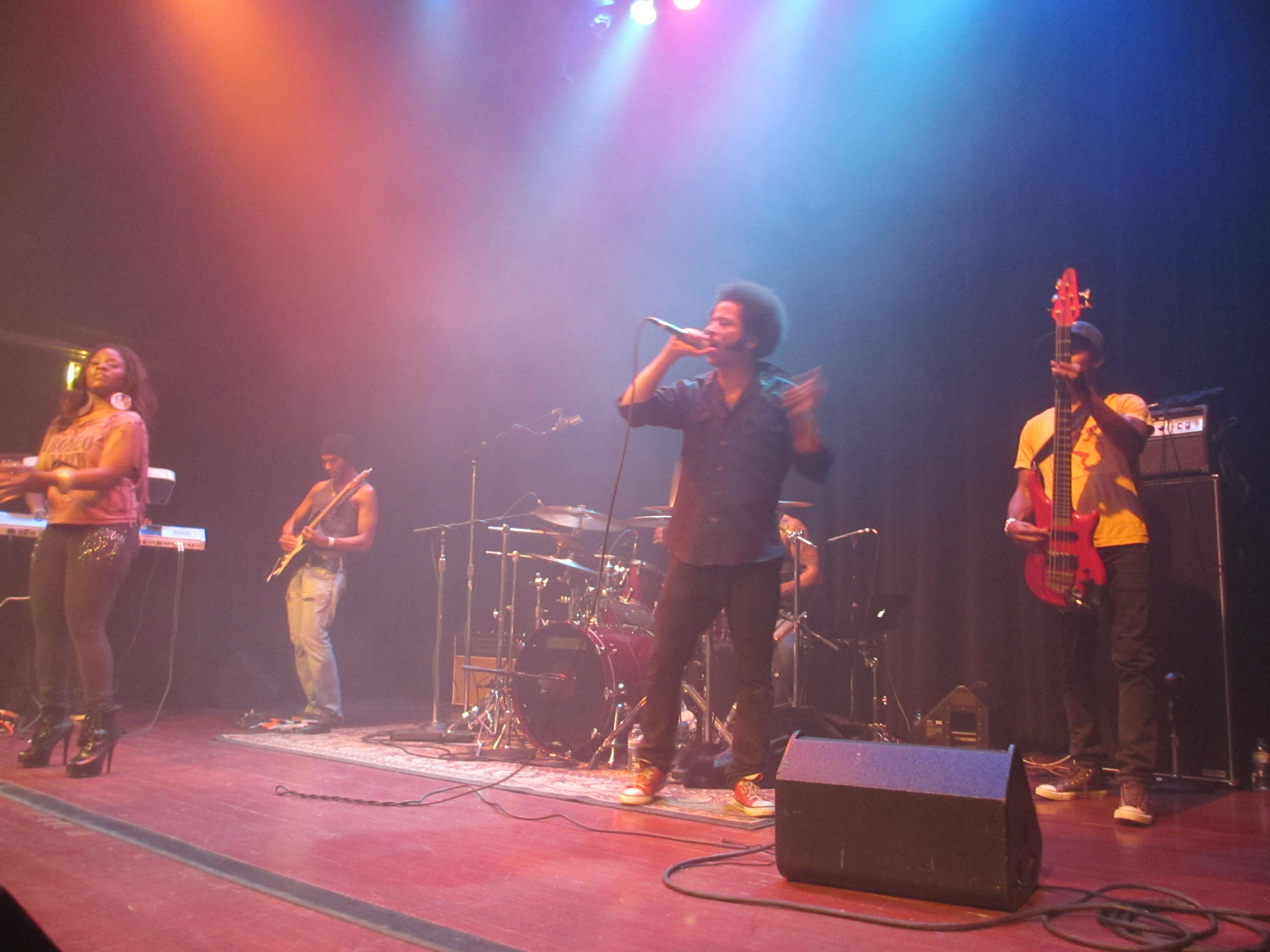
- The Coup in 2012
- Studio albums: 6
- EPs: 2
- Soundtrack albums: 1
- Singles: 8
- Promotional singles: 3
- Video albums: 1

The discography of the American California-based political hip-hop band The Coup is composed of six studio albums, two extended plays and eight singles.

== Studio albums ==
List of albums, with selected chart positions
Title	Album details	Peak chart positions						
Title	Album details	US R&B	US Rap	US Curr.	US Indie	US Heat.	US Store	US Vinyl
Kill My Landlord	Released: May 4, 1993; Label: Wild Pitch Records	83	—	—	—	—	—	—
Genocide & Juice	Released: October 18, 1994; Label: Wild Pitch Records	62	—	—	—	27	—	—
Steal This Album	Released: November 10, 1998; Label: Dogday Records	51	—	—	—	37	—	—
Party Music	Released: November 6, 2001; Label: 75 Ark	—	—	—	—	—	—	—
Pick a Bigger Weapon	Released: April 25, 2006; Label: Epitaph Records	—	—	—	35	24	—	—
Sorry to Bother You	Released: October 30, 2012; Label: Anti-	—	22	195	48	7	23	9
"—" denotes releases that did not chart, or was not released in that country.

== Extended plays ==
Title	Album details
The EP	Released: 1991; Label: Polemic Records
Sorry to Bother You: The Soundtrack	Released: June 27, 2018; Label: Interscope Records

== Singles ==
List of singles, with selected chart positions, showing year released and album name
Title	Year	Peak chart positions	Album
Title	Year	US Bub. 100	Album
"Not Free Yet"	1993	—	Kill My Landlord
"Dig It"	1993	—	Kill My Landlord
"Funk"	1993	—	Kill My Landlord
"Takin' These"	1994	—	Genocide & Juice
"Fat Cats, Bigga Fish"	1994	12	Genocide & Juice
"The Shipment"	1998	—	Steal This Album
"Me and Jesus the Pimp in a '79 Granada Last Night"	2000	—	Steal This Album
"5 Million Ways to Kill a C.E.O."	2001	—	Party Music

== Guest appearances ==
List of non-single guest appearances, with other performing artists, showing year released and album name
Title	Year	Other artist(s)	Album
"Way Past Dark"	1998	—	ICU: The Revival
"Drug Warz"	1999	—	No More Prisons
"American Nightmare (Long Version)"	2006	T-K.A.S.H.	Turf War Syndrome
