= I Love Boosters =

2026 film by Boots Riley

- Theatrical release poster
- Directed by: Boots Riley
- Written by: Boots Riley
- Produced by: Aaron Ryder; Andrew Swett; Allison Rose Carter; Jon Read; Boots Riley
- Starring: Keke Palmer; Naomi Ackie; Taylour Paige; Poppy Liu; Eiza González; LaKeith Stanfield; Will Poulter; Don Cheadle; Demi Moore
- Cinematography: Natasha Braier
- Edited by: Terel Gibson; Matthew Hannam
- Music by: Tune-Yards
- Production companies: Neon; Waypoint; Ryder Picture Company; Savage Rose Films; Annapurna Pictures
- Distributed by: Neon (United States and Canada); Focus Features Universal Pictures (international)
- Release dates: March 12, 2026 (SXSW); May 22, 2026 (United States)
- Running time: 113 minutes
- Country: United States
- Language: English
- Budget: $20 million
- Box office: $9.7 million

I Love Boosters is a 2026 American absurdist crime comedy film written and directed by Boots Riley. Following the adventures of a group of shoplifters, it features an ensemble cast that includes Keke Palmer, Naomi Ackie, Taylour Paige, Poppy Liu, Eiza González, LaKeith Stanfield, Will Poulter, Don Cheadle, and Demi Moore.

The film premiered at the 2026 South by Southwest Film & TV Festival on March 12, 2026, and was released theatrically in the United States by Neon on May 22. It received positive reviews from critics.

== Plot ==
In the San Francisco Bay Area, Corvette, Mariah, and Sade—known collectively as the "Velvet Gang"—routinely shoplift from the Metro Designers fashion chain run by designer Christie Smith, selling the clothes they steal at a discount to make ends meet. Christie regularly appears in the media discussing her vision of fashion as transformative art. In one appearance, she lambasts the Velvet Gang as "low-class urban bitches".

Corvette, an aspiring fashion designer and admirer of Christie's work, sneaks into Christie's office inside a coffee cart, overhearing Christie mention $100,000 suits. While trying to sneak out, she is spotted by Christie and provides a false name but shares her authentic admiration of Christie, and tells her that she designs clothes herself. Corvette repeatedly encounters a mysterious man with a pinky ring. Sade relates a story of a friend who hooked up with the man, who turned into a demon and sucked out her soul while performing cunnilingus on her.

The Velvet Gang get jobs at a Metro Designers store, planning to steal its inventory. Corvette realizes one of Christie's new items is identical to one of her designs. Before the gang can enact the heist, their store is cleared out by someone else; surveillance footage shows a woman sucking all the merchandise into her bag. The gang track down and capture the woman, Jianhu, who reveals she is a worker at a Metro Designers factory in China. Due to the factory's poor working conditions, Jianhu's aunt died, and her mother has developed cancer. With her cousin Li Pan, she discovered that the facility acquired teleporters to save on shipping costs, which they stole; Jianhu is teleporting Metro Designers merchandise back to China to gain leverage in demanding better pay and working conditions for the factory workers. The Velvet Gang and Jianhu team up.

The gang's former co-worker Violeta tries to convince them to help her fight the poor working conditions at Metro Designers, but they decline. With Violeta's help, they discover that the teleporter devices have two other settings based on dialectical materialism: the "situational accelerator", which heightens the conflicts inherent in whatever it is pointed at, and a "deconstruction" setting, which reverts things back into the elements that made it. After deconstructing some Metro Designers clothes, Jianhu sees that a cut on her hand has healed, as the cost of her labor has been returned back to her body.

The Velvet Gang and Jianhu infiltrate a Metro Designers fashion show with the help of the pinky ring man and use the devices to deconstruct the clothes. They find a room where the $100,000 suits are being worn by prominent media figures, who the gang order to remove the suits; they remove their skin, revealing the suits to be skin suits designed by Christie for them to wear for propaganda purposes. The Velvet Gang flees the scene, escaping from both the police and the skinless people.

Corvette and Sade argue, as Corvette wants to destroy the suits, while Sade wants to sell them to guarantee her children's future. Corvette agrees to sell them, sending Sade away with the suits as she uses the device to move between China and the US, running from authorities in both settings, as the factory employees band together to protect Corvette and Li Pan. The Velvet Gang reunite back at the fashion show where Violeta has staged a small protest. They use the devices on the "situational accelerator" setting to amplify the protests at both the show and the factory into strikes.

Some time later, a news report details that the strikes spread across the world and that workers have made significant gains. Jianhu finds that by deconstructing the clothes with the device, her mother's cancer has reversed as well. The man with the pinky ring admits to being a soul-sucking demon but asks Corvette to be with him anyway, claiming true love will turn him into a human; she declines, not wanting to be in a relationship where she cannot receive oral sex. The Velvet Gang later open a community center selling affordable clothes.

In a post-credits scene, Violeta once again explains the theory of dialectical materialism to the Velvet Gang, reiterating the inverted Hegelian dialectic at the foundation of Marxist historical materialism to the audience: "Thesis, antithesis - synthesis." (Note: This is, in fact, an inaccurate explanation of both Hegelian and Marxist dialectics.)

== Cast ==
- Keke Palmer as Corvette
- Naomi Ackie as Sade
- Taylour Paige as Mariah
  - Robin Thede as Light-Skinned Mariah
- Poppy Liu as Jianhu
- Eiza González as Violeta
- LaKeith Stanfield as Pinky Ring Guy
- Will Poulter as Grayson
- Don Cheadle as Dr. Jack
- Demi Moore as Christie Smith
- Rachel Walters as Stevie
- Kerris Dorsey as Jamie
- Kara Young as Crying Black Mother
- Adam DeVine as Christie's Boy Toy
- Jason Ritter as Upstanding Community Member
- Viggo Mortensen as the voice of documentary narrator Heine Schlumpf
- Najah Bradley as Mansion
- Jermaine Fowler as Based Young Dude
- Alan Z as Li Pan
- Ming Sun as Jianhu's mother
- Eric André as Futuristic Police Tank Cop
- Kate Berlant as the voice of Mall Manager on P.A.

== Production ==
The film is written and directed by Boots Riley, and is based on the song "I Love Boosters!" by his group the Coup. Aaron Ryder and Andrew Swett are producing the film on behalf of Ryder Picture Company. Financing came from Neon and Waypoint Entertainment. In October 2024, the ensemble cast was reported to include Keke Palmer, Demi Moore, LaKeith Stanfield, Naomi Ackie, Eiza González, Poppy Liu, Taylour Paige and Will Poulter. Melissa Barrera was offered a role personally by Riley but had to decline owing to her scheduling conflicts; Barrera herself stated it was intended to be her comeback role after being blacklisted from the film industry. Principal photography began on November 7, 2024, in Atlanta, with Natasha Braier serving as the cinematographer.

=== Music ===
The film score was composed and performed by Tune-Yards, released May 22, 2026. Riley and Palmer recorded an original soundtrack EP for the film as well, which was released May 8, 2026. The songs were written by Alina Kanin, Ben Boye, Mike Aaberg, Jesse Strauss, Lauren Palmer, Dominic Dalay, and Joel Robinow. The first single from the EP, "2-D", was released April 17, 2026. Both projects were released through Neon.

==== Soundtrack ====
I Love Boosters (Original Motion Picture Soundtrack) track listing
No.	Title	Length
1.	"Cassandra"	4:17
2.	"100% Angel"	3:25
3.	"Text Message Unsent"	4:36
4.	"2-D"	3:53
5.	"Pull the Cord"	2:25

==== Score ====
I Love Boosters (Original Motion Picture Score) track listing
No.	Title	Length
1.	"Hi Ho"	0:55
2.	"Lonely Plunk"	2:54
3.	"Bossa Plunk"	1:46
4.	"Pinky Ring Dude"	2:52
5.	"Documentary Muzak"	1:41
6.	"Clown Theme"	2:00
7.	"Dr. Jack"	2:41
8.	"Corvasieracy"	1:14
9.	"Boosting"	1:27
10.	"Hi Ho Wild Vamp"	3:31
11.	"The Stolen Design"	0:42
12.	"You Don't Have a Plan?"	1:13
13.	"Metrofunk"	1:11
14.	"Jianhu"	4:56
15.	"Situational Accelerator"	1:13
16.	"Skinless"	3:29
17.	"Epic Chase, Pt. 1"	2:11
18.	"Epic Chase, Pt. 2"	2:34
19.	"Mall Rage"	1:08
20.	"Foot Chase"	3:17
21.	"Three Devices"	1:50
22.	"Triumph"	2:47
23.	"Touching the World"	1:38
24.	"Hi Ho (Extended)"	4:20

== Release ==
I Love Boosters premiered as the opening film at the South by Southwest Film & TV Festival on March 12, 2026. It was also the opening film on May 7 for the 2026 Seattle International Film Festival.

The film competed at the 21st Rome Film Festival in 'Progressive Cinema Competition - Visions for the World of Tomorrow' in October 2026.

Neon scheduled the United States release for May 22, 2026, with a simultaneous release in Canada. In November 2025, Riley revealed that, like his previous film Sorry to Bother You, international distribution of I Love Boosters would be handled by Focus Features and Universal Pictures. The film released on VOD on June 23, 2026, and released on DVD, Blu-ray and Ultra HD Blu-ray on September 22, 2026.

== Reception ==
=== Box office ===
I Love Boosters grossed $9.7 million domestically against a production budget of approximately $20 million. Boots Riley deemed it to be a box office disappointment.

=== Critical response ===
On the review aggregator website Rotten Tomatoes, 92% of 152 critics' reviews are positive, with an average rating of 7.4/10. The website's consensus reads: "A raucous capitalist critique, I Love Boosters careens through the carefully-controlled chaos of writer-director Boots Riley's imagination to deliver a comedy that's as funny as it is thought-provoking." Metacritic, which uses a weighted average, assigned the film a score of 71 out of 100, based on 35 critics, indicating "generally favorable" reviews. Audiences surveyed by CinemaScore gave the film an average grade of "B" on an A+ to F scale.

Amy Nicholson of the Los Angeles Times called I Love Boosters "a maximalist delight", describing the film as "agit-prop that prioritizes entertaining the crowd. It roils with observations about teamwork, inequality and success, but presents as a spangled, stoner-comedy extravaganza with the moxie to give a Monty Python-esque raspberry to realism." The Boston Globe's Odie Henderson gave the film a score of three out of four stars, and wrote: "I have to give Boots Riley credit for not only creating a movie as absolutely bananas as I Love Boosters, but for also anchoring it with an angry demand to respect the working class. His entire cast is game to play along, especially Palmer and Moore, who are both delightful."

The New York Times critic Maya Phillips highlighted Palmer's performance and the costume and production design, and wrote that, "even with Riley's expert skill for quirky tonal shifts in dialogue and visual humor, some of the wackiness in the movie is more cartoonishly shopworn than his more innovative swerves [...] at the expense of a more coherent and biting political message." The Guardian's Radheyan Simonpillai gave the film three out of five stars, calling it "brash and outrageously funny" but writing that, "while every actor gets to make a brash and indelible impression, their characters can feel frustratingly limited. We don't really get intimate with Corvette and her crew, to know and adore them enough to hang on when the plot goes haywire."

=== Accolades ===
Award / Festival	Date of ceremony	Category	Recipient(s)	Result	Ref.
South by Southwest	March 19, 2026	Audience Award - Headliners	I Love Boosters	Nominated	
Astra Midseason Movie Awards	June 30, 2026	Best Actress	Keke Palmer	Nominated	
Critics' Choice Super Awards	August 6, 2026	Best Science Fiction/Fantasy Movie	I Love Boosters	Nominated	
Critics' Choice Super Awards	August 6, 2026	Best Actress in a Science Fiction/Fantasy Movie	Keke Palmer	Nominated	
