= Boots Riley =

American rapper, filmmaker, and activist

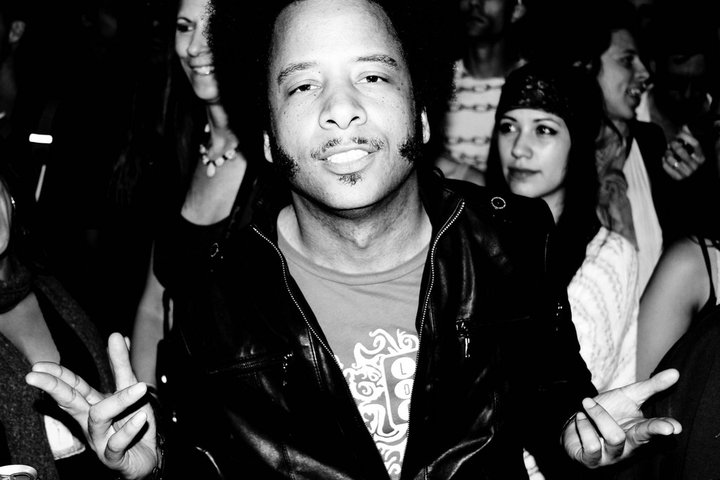
- Riley in 2010

Background information
- Born: Raymond Lawrence Riley; April 1, 1971 (age 55); Chicago, Illinois, U.S.
- Origin: Oakland, California, U.S.
- Genres: Political hip hop; alternative hip hop; funk rock; rap rock
- Occupations: Rapper; songwriter; record producer; filmmaker
- Years active: 1991–present
- Labels: Anti; Epitaph; Wild Pitch; EMI
- Member of: The Coup; Street Sweeper Social Club

Raymond Lawrence "Boots" Riley (born April 1, 1971) is an American rapper, songwriter, record producer, and filmmaker. He is the lead vocalist of The Coup and Street Sweeper Social Club. He made his feature film directorial debut as the writer and director of the science fiction dark comedy film Sorry to Bother You (2018), which originated from The Coup's 2012 album of the same name, and went on to create and direct the absurdist comedy series I'm a Virgo (2023) and the feature film I Love Boosters (2026). He is also known for his political activism.

== Early life and education ==
Raymond Lawrence Riley was born in Chicago on April 1, 1971, the son of Anitra Patterson and African American civil rights attorney Walter Riley. Anitra's mother was a Russian Jewish refugee from Königsberg, whose family had fled the Nazis, while her father had mixed African American and Native American (Wampanoag) ancestry. Riley has described his parents as "social justice organizers".

Riley and his family moved to Detroit when he was one year old, and then moved to Oakland when he was six. He attended Oakland High School. When the school faced cutbacks in the 1980s, all but 200 of its 2,200 students protested by participating in a walkout organized by Riley and his friends. Riley was interested in social and political activism from a young age. He joined the International Committee Against Racism at age 14, and the Progressive Labor Party at age 15.

== Career ==
=== Music ===
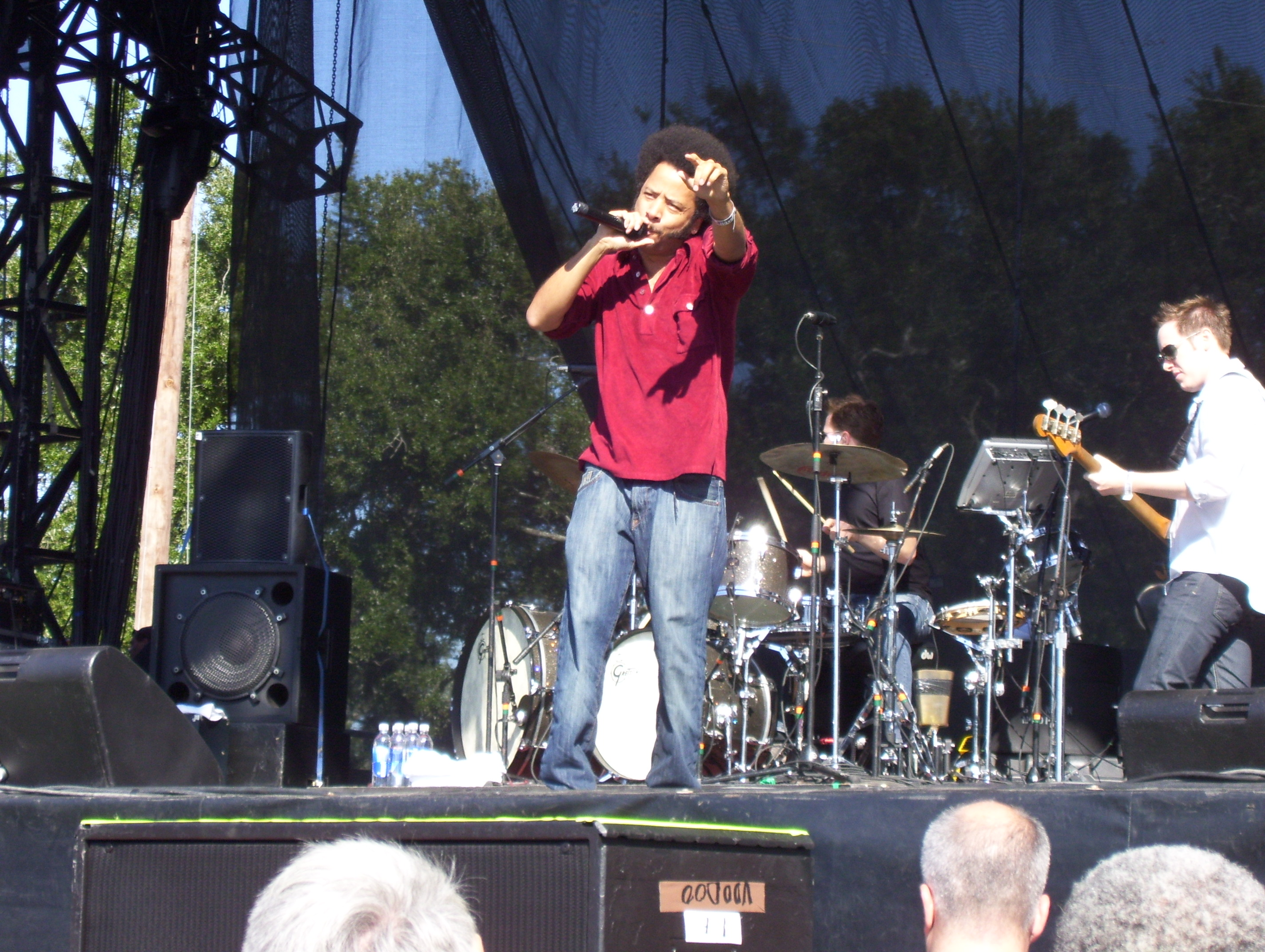
Riley performing in 2007

==== The Coup ====
In 1991, Riley founded the political hip hop group The Coup with E-roc. Alongside rappers Spice 1 and Mopreme Shakur (then known as Mocedes), they released a song on a 1991 compilation album called Dope Like a Pound or a Key, released by Wax That Azz Records. Group DJ Pam the Funkstress joined the following year. Riley was both chief lyric writer and music producer of The Coup's albums.

In 1992, The Coup signed to Wild Pitch Records/EMI, and released their debut album Kill My Landlord in 1993. Two of the album's singles, "Dig It" and "Not Yet Free" received play on national Black radio, BET and Yo! MTV Raps.

In 1993, E-40 released the video for "Practice Lookin' Hard", a song based around Riley's lyric, "I got a mirror in my pocket and I practice lookin' hard", from the song "Not Yet Free". The video featured Riley singing the chorus while he, E-40 and Tupac Shakur reflected light into the camera from a handheld mirror while dancing around.

In 1994, The Coup released their second album, Genocide & Juice, featuring guest appearances by E-40 and Spice 1. Fueled by video play and some radioplay for the single "Fat Cats and Bigga Fish", the album shot up the charts, but stalled when EMI absorbed Wild Pitch. At this point, E-roc left The Coup on amicable terms.

1998's Steal This Album, released on indie label Dogday Records, was called "a masterpiece of slow-rolling West Coast funk" by Rolling Stone magazine. The single, "Me and Jesus the Pimp in a '79 Granada Last Night", was an eight-minute song about the grown-up son of a prostitute driving his mother's killer to a secluded place in which to murder him. A novel, Too Beautiful for Words by Monique W. Morris, based on the story characters and descriptions in the song, was published by HarperCollins in 2000. Del the Funky Homosapien guests on the track "The Repo Man Sings for You".

The group's fourth album, Party Music, was released on 75 Ark Records in 2001. It was re-released in 2005 by Epitaph Records. The original cover art depicted group members standing in front of the Twin Towers of the World Trade Center as they explode. Riley is depicted pushing a button on a bass guitar tuner and DJ Pam the Funkstress is shown holding conductor's wands. The photo was taken in May 2001, with the album scheduled to be released just after the September 11, 2001 attacks. In response to the uncanny similarity of the artwork with the attacks, the release was delayed until an alternative cover could be prepared. The album hit No. 8 in the 2001 Village Voice Pazz and Jop Poll, was named "Pop Album of the Year" by The Washington Post, and "Hip-Hop Album of the Year" by Rolling Stone. The album included a guest appearance by dead prez on the song "Get Up".

Riley released a controversial press release on September 18, 2001, later published in the book, Another World Is Possible. The press release stated that "last week's events were symptomatic of a larger backlash against U.S. corporate imperialism". The controversy surrounding the cover art, press release and the lyrics from Party Music (specifically the song "5 Million Ways to Kill a CEO") led to Riley appearing on local network news affiliates all over the U.S. He appeared on Fox News's Hannity and Colmes and ABC's Politically Incorrect with Bill Maher. During this time, conservative commentator Michelle Malkin called Riley's lyrics "a stomach-turning example of anti-Americanism disguised as highbrow intellectual expression". The Independent concluded it was "protest album of the year, by a million-man march".

In 2006, The Coup released Pick a Bigger Weapon on Epitaph Records, featuring guest appearances by Tom Morello, Talib Kweli, Black Thought from The Roots, and Jello Biafra.

==== Work with Tom Morello ====
In 2003, guitarist Tom Morello invited Riley to be part of the "Tell Us the Truth Tour", which was meant to shed light on the monopolization of the media and the coming FTAA agreements. The tour, hosted by Janeane Garofalo and Naomi Klein, featured acoustic performances by Riley, Morello, Billy Bragg, Steve Earle, Mike Mills, and Jill Sobule.

In 2006, Morello approached Riley to form a band together under the name Street Sweeper. The duo, who later changed their name to Street Sweeper Social Club, releasing their self-titled debut album in 2009. They toured in support of it along with Nine Inch Nails and Jane's Addiction. On May 24, a press release went out announcing Street Sweeper Social Club as one of the headliners of the 2010 Rock the Bells tour. Street Sweeper Social Club released The Ghetto Blaster EP in late July 2010.

==== Independent work ====
In 1991, the same year Riley co-founded The Coup, he and other activists and hip hop artists created the Mau Mau Rhythm Collective. The Collective put on "Hip-Hop Edutainment Concerts", which allied with and promoted the campaigns of community-based organizations like Women's Economic Agenda Project (WEAP), Copwatch, International Campaign To Free Geronimo Pratt, the Black Panther Alumni Association, and various anti-police brutality projects. The Collective would use the growing popularity of their concerts to bring a large number of youth to take over a closed Oakland city council meeting and hold a public meeting.

In 2005, Riley produced the score for an episode of The Simpsons entitled "Pranksta Rap".

In 2007 and 2008, Riley toured heavily with New Orleans-based band Galactic. The band performed The Coup songs behind Riley's vocals and they also performed their collaboration, "Hustle Up". In 2008, while performing with Galactic, police interrupted the concert and Riley was charged with using "abusive language"—a charge that had not been laid in 26 years, and never before against a performer.

In 2010 and 2011, Riley recorded with Ursus Minor on the album I Will Not Take "But" for an Answer, and toured with the group in France.

=== Filmmaking ===
In 2012, Riley finished a screenplay for "an absurdist dark comedy with aspects of magical realism and science fiction", inspired by his own time working as a telemarketer. He later secured financing to direct the screenplay and titled the film Sorry to Bother You (2018), a name it shares with The Coup's 2012 album, which Riley produced instead of the film at the time due to financial issues. The film premiered at the Sundance Film Festival on January 20, 2018, and was theatrically released in the United States on July 6, 2018, by Annapurna Pictures. The film received acclaim for its screenplay, direction, concept, and performances.

In July 2018, Riley signed a television deal with Media Res. In June 2020, he announced a seven-episode surrealist comedy series entitled I'm a Virgo. The show premiered at South by Southwest on March 11, 2023, and was released on Amazon Prime Video three months later.

In 2021, Riley signed a two-year overall television deal with Media Res. His most recent film, I Love Boosters, premiered in the United States on May 22, 2026.

On January 11, 2026, Riley confirmed that he was working on a film adaptation of Mr. Burns, a Post-Electric Play by playwright Anne Washburn.

== Activism ==
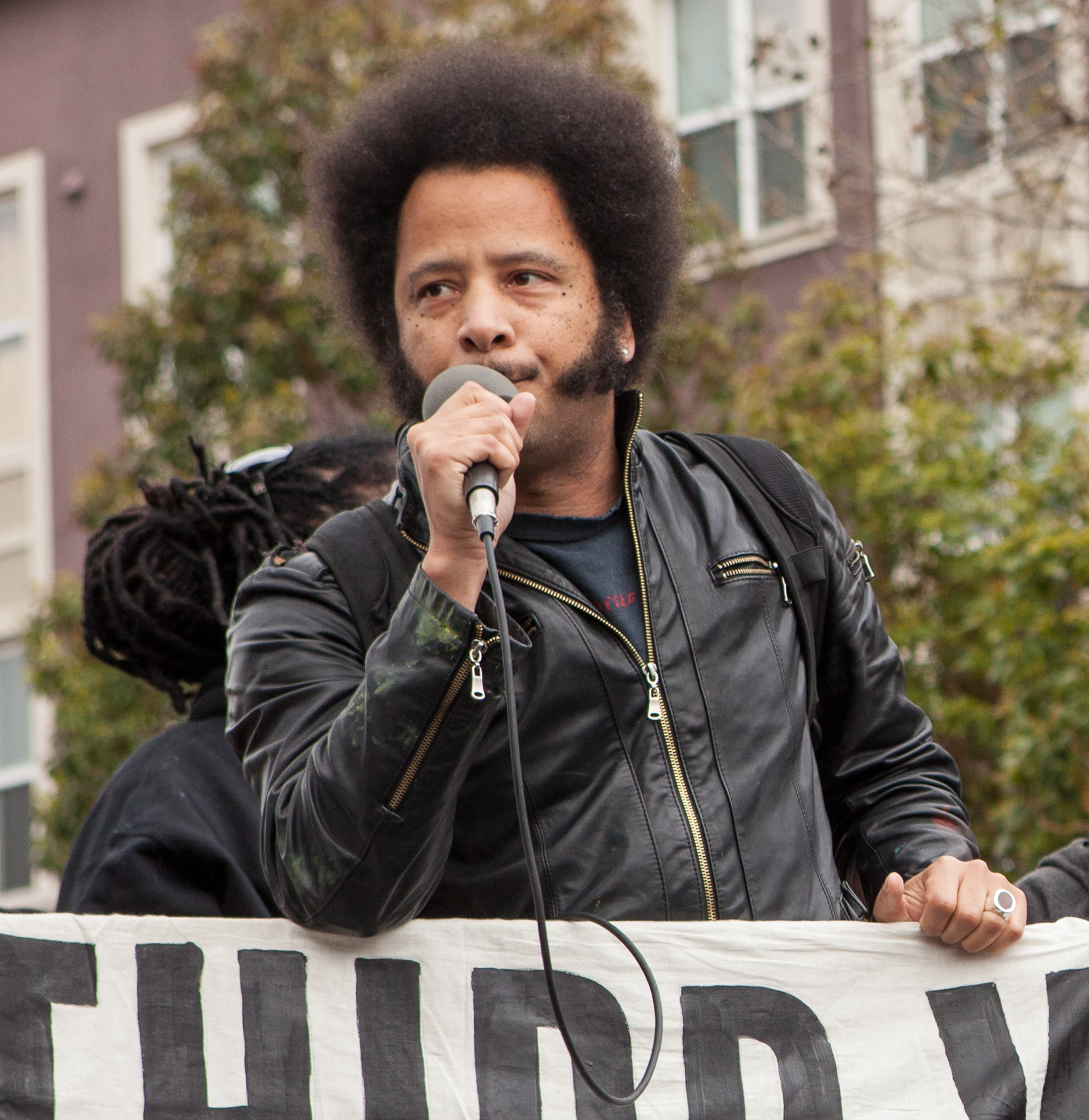
Riley speaking at a rally for Martin Luther King, Jr. Day, 2017

Riley identifies as a communist.

When E-Roc left The Coup in 1994, Riley decided to stop making music in favor of forming an organization called The Young Comrades, with a few other radical, black community organizers including journalist and activist JR Valrey. The organization mounted a few important campaigns in Oakland which yielded some minor victories, such as the campaign against Oakland's "no cruising" ordinance.

In 2000, Riley, through his workshop on Art and Organizing at La Peña Cultural Center, led a group of young artists to create "Guerilla Hip-Hop Concerts" on a flatbed truck which traveled throughout Oakland to protest California's Proposition 21. The workshop also distributed tens of thousands free cassettes of "The Rumble", which he called "newspapers on tape.

In 2002, Riley taught a daily high school class, "Culture and Resistance: Persuasive Lyric Writing", at the School of Social Justice and Community Development in East Oakland.

During the fall of 2011, Riley became heavily involved with the Occupy Oakland movement. In 2018, he spoke at the Socialism 2018 conference.

At the 34th Independent Spirit Awards in 2019, Riley criticized U.S. involvement in the 2019 Venezuelan presidential crisis during his acceptance speech for the Best First Feature award for Sorry To Bother You. His speech, which was cut short, was delivered to the press.

In February 2020, Boots announced his support for Vermont Senator Bernie Sanders in the 2020 United States presidential election.

Riley is a supporter of Palestinian liberation. In 2022, he signed onto the Musicians For Palestine pledge, refusing to perform in Israel following the 2021 Israel–Palestine crisis. He signed an October 2023 open letter, Artists4Ceasefire, calling for a ceasefire during the Israeli bombardment of Gaza. In September 2025, he signed an open pledge with Film Workers for Palestine pledging not to work with Israeli film institutions "that are implicated in genocide and apartheid against the Palestinian people."

Riley has defended the annexation of Tibet by the People's Republic of China, denouncing Tibet as a CIA-backed "feudal slave-owning society", with practices that China had attempted to stop before their invasion. The advocacy group International Campaign for Tibet criticized him for these statements.

== Discography ==
=== Group artist ===
==== The Coup ====
- Kill My Landlord (1993)
- Genocide & Juice (1994)
- Steal This Album (1998)
- Party Music (2001)
- Pick a Bigger Weapon (2006)
- Sorry to Bother You (2012)
- Sorry to Bother You: The Soundtrack (2018)

==== Street Sweeper Social Club ====
- Street Sweeper Social Club (2009)

=== Solo guest appearances ===
- 1991 – Dope Like a Pound or a Key (Compilation)
- 1994 – "Streets of Oakland" from The Big Badass by Ant Banks
- 2004 – Zugzwang by Ursus Minor
- 2007 – "Hustle Up" from From the Corner to the Block by Galactic
- 2009 – "Soledad" from Este Mundo by Rupa & the April Fishes
- 2009 - "What I Need is Something Different" from What About Me by 1 Giant Leap
- 2010 – "M M M"; "Get On With It" from I Will Not Take "But" for an Answer by Ursus Minor
- 2011 – "9/11 'til Infinity" from From the Dumpster to the Grave by Star Fucking Hipsters
- 2011 – "Black Flags" by Atari Teenage Riot
- 2014 – "Pocket Full of Slave owners" by Muja Messiah
- 2014 - "Hickory" by Kool A.D. from Word O.K.
- 2014 – "Black Is Beltza" by Fermin Muguruza
- 2015 - "Jaruba Triangle" from Goddess in Yer Way by Howardian
- 2016 - "Booty Bang" by Angelo Moore from Centuries of Heat
- 2017 - "Hit or Miss" by Libretto

== Filmography ==
Film

| Year | Title | Director | Writer |
|---|---|---|---|
| 2018 | Sorry to Bother You | Yes | Yes |
| 2026 | I Love Boosters | Yes | Yes |

Television

| Year | Title | Director | Writer | Creator | Executive Producer |
|---|---|---|---|---|---|
| 2023 | I'm a Virgo | Yes | Yes | Yes | Yes |
