= The Coup =

American hip-hop group

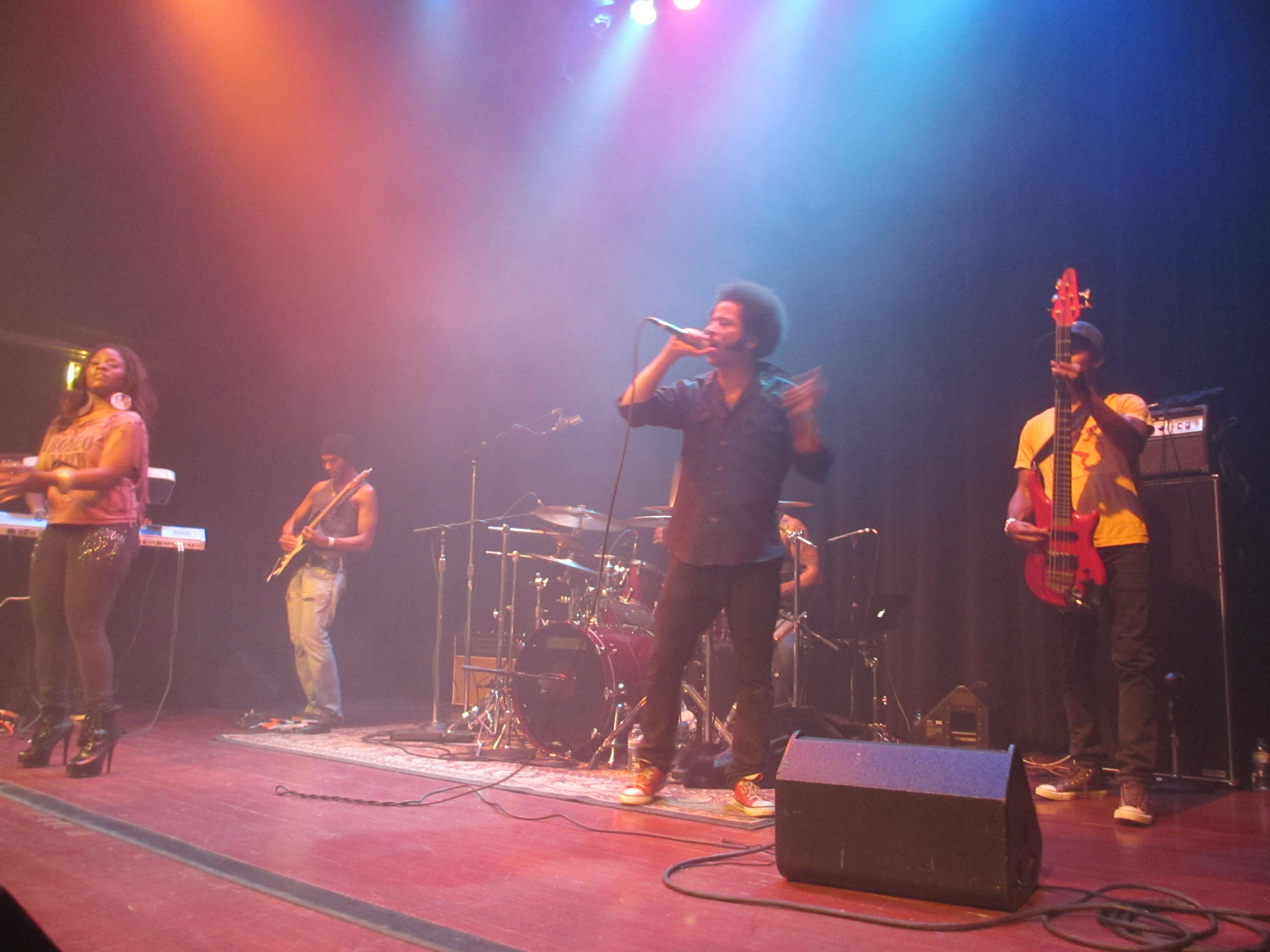
- The Coup in 2012

Background information
- Origin: Oakland, California, United States
- Genres: Hip-hop; funk rock
- Years active: 1991–present
- Labels: Wild Pitch; EMI; Dogday; 75 Ark; Tommy Boy; Warner Bros.; Epitaph; Anti-
- Members: Boots Riley; Silk-E; B'nai Rebelfront; Hassan Hurd; J.J. Jungle; L.J. Holoman
- Past members: E-Roc; T-K.A.S.H. Latoya London; Grego Simmons; Pam the Funkstress; DJO

The Coup is a American hip-hop band from Oakland, California. Their music is an amalgamation of influences, including funk, punk, hip-hop, and soul. Frontman Boots Riley's revolutionarily-charged lyrics rank The Coup as a renowned political hip-hop band aligned to radical music groups such as Crass, Dead Prez and Rage Against the Machine.

The Coup's music is driven by assertive and danceable bass-driven backbeats overlaid by critical, hopeful, and witty lyrics, often with a bent towards the literary. The Coup's songs critique, observe, and lampoon capitalism, American politics, white patriarchal exploitation, police brutality, marijuana addiction, romance, classism, and disparities along racial boundaries, from a Marxist perspective.

== History ==
=== First decade ===
The Coup's debut release was 1991s The EP and almost all of the songs on it (except "Economics 101") were put on 1993's Kill My Landlord. In 1994, the group released its second album, Genocide & Juice. The group took a four-year recording hiatus to work as community activists before releasing Steal This Album (the title of which pays tribute to 1960s radical Abbie Hoffman's yippie manifesto, Steal this Book) to critical acclaim in 1998. Steal This Album featured the stand-out single, "Me and Jesus the Pimp in a ’79 Granada Last Night." The online magazine Dusted called Steal This Album "the best hip-hop album of the 1990s".

=== Party Music and post-9/11 aftermath ===
In 2001, The Coup released Party Music to widespread praise. However, in part because of distribution problems, sales of the album were low. The original album cover art depicted group members Pam the Funkstress and Riley standing in front of the twin towers of the World Trade Center as they are destroyed by huge explosions, and Riley is pushing the button on a guitar tuner. The cover art was finished in June 2001 and the album was scheduled to be released in mid-September. However, in response to the similarity of the artwork with the September 11, 2001 attacks, the album release was delayed until November of that year with the cover featuring a hand with a flaming martini glass.

The attention generated concerning the album's cover art precipitated some criticism of the group's lyrical content as well, particularly the Party Music track "5 Million Ways to Kill a CEO." The song's lyrics includes lines such as "You could throw a twenty in a vat of hot oil/When he jump in after it, watch him boil." Conservative columnist Michelle Malkin cited the song in calling the Coup's work a "stomach-turning example of anti-Americanism disguised as highbrow intellectual expression."

=== Mid-2000s ===
On November 15, 2005, Tarus Jackson (AKA Terrance), who had joined the group as a promoter, was fatally shot during a robbery at his home in Oakland.

December 2, 2006 saw another tragedy for the Coup: About two hours following a performance at the San Diego House of Blues, the tour bus in which the group was riding drove off the road and flipped over before becoming engulfed in flames. All passengers managed to climb out alive, although some were badly injured and required hospitalization. The group did, however, lose all of its clothes, computers, cash, identification, house/car keys, cell phones, all of its instruments, and sound equipment. The ensuing insurance payment was delayed in its arrival, and the group was forced to cancel the rest of its tour.

The group’s songs "My Favorite Mutiny" and "Pork & Beef" were featured in the 2007 film, Superbad, with the former also being featured in the HBO miniseries 24/7 Flyers-Rangers, as well as in the video game NBA Live 07, while "Ride the Fence" was featured in EA's 2007 skateboarding video game Skate. The song “Captain Sterling’s Little Problem” accompanied the closing credits of Sir, No, Sir, a documentary about the GI anti-war movement.

=== 2010–2020 ===
On Wednesday January 13, 2010, The Coup’s bassist Dewey Tucker was shot and killed on the I-80 freeway in Hercules, CA, while driving from his home in Vallejo, CA, to rehearsal with The Coup in Oakland, CA. It was later found to be a case of mistaken identity.

The Coup's sixth album, a concept album entitled Sorry to Bother You, was released on October 30, 2012, to wide acclaim. The first track, "The Magic Clap", was leaked by the band themselves and posted below an article on August 13, 2012.

The album Sorry to Bother You was inspired by a screenplay written by Riley, "a dark comedy with magical realism" that drew inspiration from his time spent working as a telemarketer. The film's screenplay was published by McSweeney's in 2014. Riley was able to secure funding to turn the script into the film Sorry to Bother You, which was released in theaters by Annapurna Pictures on July 6, 2018. The film, which follows a young African-American telemarketer who adopts a white accent in order to thrive at his job, stars Lakeith Stanfield, with Armie Hammer, Tessa Thompson, Terry Crews, and Danny Glover in supporting roles.

Having taken six years after their last album, The Coup recorded a full soundtrack to the film, entitled The Soundtrack to Sorry to Bother You, and released the first single, "OYAHYTT (feat. Lakeith Stanfield)", on July 13, 2018. Guest artists included Janelle Monae, Killer Mike, and E-40. Songs from the 2012 album were not in the actual film. Vinyl for the album was released in February 2020.

== Band members ==
=== Current ===
- Boots Riley – vocals (1991–present)
- Silk-E – vocals (2003–present)
- JJ Jungle – bass (2010–present)
- Hassan Hurd – drums (?–present)
- B'nai Rebelfront – guitar (?–present)
- Lionel "LJ" Holoman – keyboards (?–present)

=== Former ===
- DJO – DJ (1991)
- E-roc – vocals (1991–1997)
- Pam the Funkstress – DJ (1992–2017)
- Dewey Tucker – bass (?–2010)
- Grego Simmons – guitar

== Cultural impact ==
=== Literature ===
- The 2001 novel Too Beautiful For Words, by Monique W. Morris, was based on The Coup's 1997 7-minute opus "Me And Jesus The Pimp In A '79 Grenada Last Night". Morris kept the original storyline and main characters of the song as the setting for her work. Some of the dialogue in the book is directly from the song as well. The title of the novel is from the refrain of the bridge in The Coup's song. Published by HarperCollins Publishers.
- Vijay Prashad's 2002 book, Fat Cats and Running Dogs starts with a quote from The Coup's "Fat Cats and Bigga Fish".
- The 2013 book Party Music, by Rickey Vincent, was inspired by the concept of The Coup's 2001 album Party Music and discussions that the author had with Boots Riley about the subject. The book is a history of The Lumpen, the Black Panther Party's funk band. Riley wrote the introduction to the book.
- My Favorite Mutiny Zine is a zine named after The Coup's song of the same name. It was based in Wyoming and appears to have stopped printing in 2011 or 2012.

=== Music ===
- The 1993 song "Practice Lookin' Hard", by E40, has a chorus and a concept built around the lyric "I got a mirror in my pocket and I practice lookin' hard", from The Coup's 1993 song "Not Yet Free". Boots Riley performs the vocal in the E40 song, and performs in the video alongside Tupac Shakur and E40.
- The 1998 song "Way Past Dark" was released as an exclusive track to the ICU (Ill Crew Universal) album "The Revival."
- The 2013 song "Romantisch", by Jel of Anticon fame, has a chorus which is a vocal sample of Boots Riley from The Coup's 1994 song "The Name Game".

=== Film ===
The 1997 film Money Talks starring Chris Tucker, has exactly the same opening scene as the opening scene of The Coup's 1993 video for "Not Yet Free". In both, the protagonist is riding around in an expensive looking Mercedes-Benz, pulls up to the car wash to park and gets out. In both, it is at this time that we figure out that the protagonist merely works at the car wash. In both, the protagonist holds the keys out in front of the actual owner and feigns as if he's going to hit the owner.

== Discography ==
=== Studio albums ===
- Kill My Landlord (1993)
- Genocide & Juice (1994)
- Steal This Album (1998)
- Party Music (2001)
- Pick a Bigger Weapon (2006)
- Sorry to Bother You (2012)

=== Extended plays ===
- The EP (1991)
- La Grande Boutique (2014)

== Music videos ==
=== From Kill My Landlord ===
- "Not Yet Free", directed by Kevin Bray
- "Dig It", Directed by Robert Caruso
- "Funk (Remix)", Directed by Abraham Lim

=== From Genocide and Juice ===
- "Takin' These"
- "Fat Cats and Bigga Fish", Directed by Andrei Rozen

=== From Steal This Album ===
- "Me And Jesus The Pimp In A '79 Grenada Last Night", Directed by Boots Riley

=== From Party Music ===
- "Ride The Fence", Directed by Haik Hoisington

=== From Pick a Bigger Weapon ===
- "We Are The Ones", Directed by Vince Tocce

=== From Sorry to Bother You ===
- "The Magic Clap", Directed by Pete Lee
- "Land Of 7 Billion Dances", Directed by Yak Films
- "The Guillotine", Directed by Beau Patrick Coulon
- "Your Parents' Cocaine (Featuring Justin Sane from Anti-Flag)", Directed by Eat The Fish
- "The Magic Clap (Version 2, featuring Patton Oswalt)", Directed by Pete Lee
- "Long Island Iced Tea, Neat (featuring Japanther)", Directed by Kelly Gallagher

== Song uses in media ==
- "Fat Cats and Bigga Fish" – The Daytrippers
- "Pimps (Freestyling At The Fortune 500 Club)" – Don's Plum
- "Superfly (Theme Song)" – MX Superfly
- "Ride The Fence" – Skate
- "My Favorite Mutiny" – NBA Live 07, Driver: Parallel Lines, Superbad, Winning Time: The Rise of the Lakers Dynasty (opening theme)
- "Pork And Beef" – Superbad
- "The Guillotine", from "Sorry To Bother You", was used as the "fight" song for Sporting Kansas City during their championship 2013 season.
- ”My Favorite Mutiny” plays over the opening credits of HBO’s Winning Time. The show uses different verses in seasons one and two.
