= Steal This Episode =

- The Simpsons episode
- Episode no.: Season 25; Episode 9
- Directed by: Matthew Nastuk
- Written by: J. Stewart Burns
- Production code: SABF05
- Original air date: January 5, 2014

Guest appearances
- Judd Apatow as himself; Will Arnett as Deputy Director Gratman; Rob Halford as himself; Leslie Mann as herself; Kevin Michael Richardson as Inmate on Bus, Hollywood Filmmaker; Seth Rogen as himself; Paul Rudd as himself; Channing Tatum as Movie Homer Simpson

Episode chronology
← Previous "White Christmas Blues"	Next → "Married to the Blob"
- The Simpsons season 25

"Steal This Episode" is the ninth episode of the twenty-fifth season of the American animated television series The Simpsons and the 539th episode of the series. It originally aired on the Fox network in the United States on January 5, 2014. The episode was written by J. Stewart Burns and directed by Matthew Nastuk. The title is a takeoff of Abbie Hoffman's Steal This Book (1971).

In the episode, to combat the poor quality of today's movie theaters, Homer and Bart team up to illegally download movies and exhibit them in a makeshift theater in the backyard, but Homer ends up arrested by the FBI when Marge sends Hollywood a check and an apology note. Will Arnett and Channing Tatum guest starred. In addition, filmmaker Judd Apatow, actors Leslie Mann, Seth Rogen, Paul Rudd, and musician Rob Halford guest starred as themselves. The episode received positive reviews.

== Plot ==
Homer is getting frazzled over hearing spoilers about the current blockbuster films but his rushed trip to see a new one ends with him decrying the smartphone-laden atmosphere and being thrown out of the movie theater by ushers after he breaks his 3-D glasses. Bart later cheers him up by showing him how to download the movie illegally. Homer then decides to open a backyard theater to show movies downloaded from the Internet. Marge starts to feel guilty after watching the movie and sends a check along with an apology letter to Hollywood to repay the money for the tickets she should have bought. A manager in Hollywood receives the letter and alerts the FBI after using the rolled-up check to snort cocaine.

The FBI raids the Simpsons' house and arrests Homer for movie piracy. Marge feels guilty for getting him in trouble; however, during dinner the next night, Marge defensively maintains the belief that she did the right thing, even though Bart and Lisa side with Homer (as Bart notes, being a movie pirate isn't even the worst kind of pirate Homer has ever been). Homer's bus to Springfield Penitentiary gets taken over by the prisoners who all consider copyright infringement to be much worse than robbing a bank or trafficking drugs and plan to kill him for his actions. The bus crashes and falls onto a ledge, where Homer is rescued by a passing train after the prisoners abandon the bus. He returns home and refuses to turn himself in after Marge asks him to give himself up.

Lisa takes the family to a Swedish consulate, since downloading movies is not illegal in Sweden. The FBI waits outside the consulate for Homer to leave, unsuccessfully trying to force him out by playing Judas Priest music at high volume. While in hiding, Marge confesses to Homer that she turned him in. Homer, feeling betrayed, sadly surrenders to the FBI and is taken into custody.

During his trial at a U.S. Federal Court, Homer makes no attempt to defend himself and is found guilty of illegal reproduction and distribution of copyrighted material. Before he is sentenced, and with some encouragement from Marge, he delivers a speech about his movie piracy. The Hollywood filmmakers who attend the trial are impressed by Homer's story and they drop all the charges, intending to buy the rights to Homer's story to turn it into a movie, with Homer asking to sign with whichever studio can convince Channing Tatum to gain the most weight to play him.

A week before the film, Streaming Valor, is released to movie theaters, the residents of Springfield give Homer a surprise special screening of an illegally downloaded copy. Homer gets angry at them, since he now gets money from the movie profit and kicks them out of his backyard while telling them to see it when it comes out in theaters.

While watching Streaming Valor in the theater, Bart asks Lisa which side were the real pirates: the movie producers or those fighting for Internet freedom. Lisa says that both sides claim their intentions are noble, but they are just trying to make as much money as possible. She then proceeds to say who the "real pirate" is, but is censored by the 1987-93 Fox logo and NASCAR footage (most exactly footage from the 2011 Goody's Fast Relief 500, which was broadcast by Fox), which was also used to censor parts of Bart teaching Homer how to download movies, during the credits followed by a pirate flag and the laughing sounds of Seth Rogen.

== Production ==
=== Development ===
Executive producer Matt Selman became interested in doing a story about media piracy after he heard about the situation of Kim Dotcom. Selman felt stealing movies was a crime but also felt the media companies were also criminals. He gave the example of The Simpsons officially operating at a financial loss because of Hollywood accounting. He also felt people would pay for media if it was readily accessible.

To create the episode, the producers did not want to dive into the technical details of piracy, so they simplified the story by having Marge inform the movie studios about Homer's activities, which would also create a conflict between Homer and Marge. To make Homer sympathetic, a scene was included of Homer complaining after paying for movie tickets and needing to watch advertisements in the theater. Jokes were also added about Fox properties because Selman stated their parent corporation would accept them because it would make the corporation "seem cool."

=== Casting ===
In June 2013, TVLine reported that Will Arnett would guest star as an FBI agent hunting Homer for illegally downloading a movie. In October 2013, Entertainment Weekly reported that, in the same episode, filmmaker Judd Apatow, actors Leslie Mann, Seth Rogen, Paul Rudd, Channing Tatum, and musician Rob Halford would guest star as themselves. Rogen previously co-wrote and appeared as a different character in the twenty-first season episode "Homer the Whopper." Rudd previously appeared as a different character in the twenty-second season episode "Love Is a Many Strangled Thing." Executive producer Matt Selman stated there would be twists involving Rudd and Tatum.

=== Release ===
Due to NFL overrun, the episode did not air until 8:07 PM.

== Cultural references ==
The title of the episode is in reference to the Abbie Hoffman novel, Steal This Book.

Rob Halford plays a parody of the Judas Priest song "Breaking the Law." Judas Priest is erroneously referred to as a death metal band in the episode, which drew criticism from the music press. The following episode's opening sequence shows Bart Simpson writing "Judas Priest is not death metal" as the chalkboard gag.

The scene in which a fight breaks out on Homer's prison bus causing it to crash onto train tracks shares similarities with a scene from the 1993 film The Fugitive.

== Reception ==
The episode received generally positive reviews from critics.

Dennis Perkins of The A.V. Club gave the episode a B, saying "The strongest episode of The Simpsons’ 25th season so far, 'Steal This Episode' avoids a few pitfalls the show has been more prone to stumble into in later years, provides a double-handful of funny lines and gags, and actually seems invested in telling a coherent story from beginning to end. Not classic Simpsons by any yardstick, but certainly a welcome respite from what has been a streak of fairly dire late-run episodes."

Teresa Lopez of TV Fanatic applauded the episode and gave it a 5 out of 5, commenting mainly on the show's use of guest stars, saying "the stars were an essential part of the plot, so it made sense to trot out Judd Apatow and his usual crew of actors (Seth Rogen, Paul Rudd, Leslie Mann), along with Channing Tatum as well. In essence, the episode really played to the show's strengths. For example, Homer is always behind the times and, once he's caught up, he can't help but take his new hobbies too far."

In 2014, Vulture ranked this episode as the 57th best episode of the series to stream. In 2019, Vulture named it the 58th best episode to stream.

In 2023, Tony Sokol of Den of Geek named the episode the eighth-best episode of The Simpsons from the 2010s.

Leading out of an NFL wild card playoff game, the episode received a 4.6 rating and was watched by a total of 12.04 million people, making it the most watched show on Animation Domination that night.

This marks the most-watched episode of the series since the twenty-second season episode "Moms I'd Like to Forget.

J. Stewart Burns was nominated for a Writers Guild of America Award for Outstanding Writing in Animation at the 67th Writers Guild of America Awards for his script to this episode.
