= 2011 Goody's Fast Relief 500 =

Race details
- Race 6 of 36 in the 2011 NASCAR Sprint Cup Series
- Date: April 3, 2011
- Location: Martinsville Speedway, Martinsville, Virginia
- Course: Permanent racing facility
- Course length: .526 miles (.847 km)
- Distance: 500 laps, 263 mi (423 km)
- Weather: Partly cloudy with a high around 63; wind out of the SW at 7 mph.
- Average speed: 74.195 mph (119.405 km/h)

Pole position
Driver	Jamie McMurray	Earnhardt Ganassi Racing
- Time: 19.621

Most laps led
Driver	Kyle Busch	Joe Gibbs Racing
- Laps: 151

Winner
No. 29	Kevin Harvick	Richard Childress Racing

Television in the United States
- Network: Fox Broadcasting Company
- Announcers: Mike Joy, Darrell Waltrip and Larry McReynolds
- Nielsen ratings: 4.4/10; 3.9/9 (overnight); 7.229 million viewers

The 2011 Goody's Fast Relief 500 was a NASCAR Sprint Cup Series stock car race that was held on April 3, 2011 at Martinsville Speedway in Martinsville, Virginia. Contested over 500 laps, it was the sixth race of the 2011 season. Kevin Harvick from the Richard Childress Racing team won the race, while Dale Earnhardt Jr. finished in the second position ahead of Kyle Busch. Scenes from this particular race are shown in The Simpsons episode "Steal This Episode".

== Report ==
=== Background ===
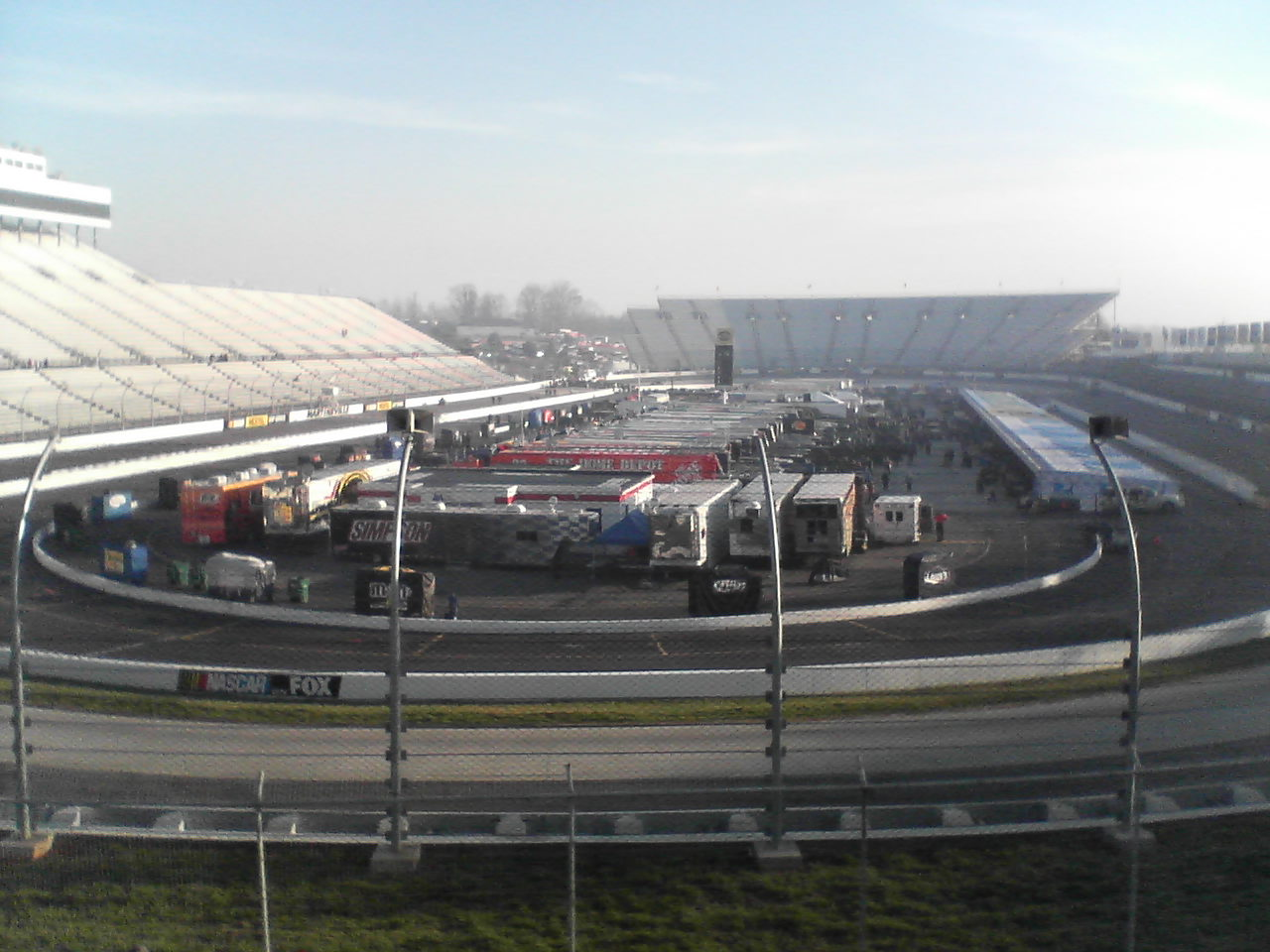
Martinsville Speedway, the race track where the race was held.

Martinsville Speedway is one of five short tracks to hold NASCAR races. The standard track at Martinsville Speedway is a four-turn short track oval that is 0.526 miles (0.847 km) long. The track's turns are banked at eleven degrees, while the front stretch, the location of the finish line, is banked at zero degrees. The back stretch also has a zero degree banking. The racetrack had seats for 63,000 spectators.

Before the race, Carl Edwards led the Drivers' Championship with 187 points, and Ryan Newman stood in second with 178. Kurt Busch followed in third with 177 points, one ahead of Kyle Busch and four ahead of Jimmie Johnson in fourth and fifth. Tony Stewart with 170 was six points ahead of Paul Menard, as Juan Pablo Montoya with 161 points, was four ahead of Kevin Harvick and Matt Kenseth in ninth and tenth. In the Manufacturers' Championship, Toyota, Chevrolet and Ford were in the first three positions with 31 points, 14 ahead of Dodge in fourth. Denny Hamlin was the race's defending champion after winning it in 2010.

=== Practice and qualifying ===
Two practice sessions were held in preparation for the race; both on Friday. The first session lasted 80 minutes long, while the second was 90 minutes long. Kyle Busch was quickest with a time of 19.804 seconds in the first session, 0.001 seconds faster than Joey Logano. Harvick was just off Logano's pace, followed by Brad Keselowski, Jamie McMurray, and Jeff Burton. Menard was seventh, still within a second of Busch's time. Also in the first practice session, Johnson spun sideways after the second turn.

In the second and final practice, David Ragan was quickest with a time of 19.670 seconds. Jeff Gordon followed in second, ahead of Keselowski and David Reutimann. Kasey Kahne was fifth quickest, with a time of 19.764 seconds. Ryan Newman, Bobby Labonte, Marcos Ambrose, Brian Vickers, and A. J. Allmendinger rounded out the first ten positions. Kyle Busch, who was first in the first session, could only manage 23rd. The second session also had cautions because of spins. The drivers involved were Logano and Dennis Setzer.

Forty-four cars are entered for qualifying, but only forty-three could qualify for the race because of NASCAR's qualifying procedure. McMurray clinched his first pole position of the season, with a time of 19.621 seconds. He was joined on the front row of the grid by Newman. Kasey Kahne qualified third, Logano took fourth, and Hamlin started fifth. Allmendinger, Labonte, Reutimann, Harvick and Regan Smith rounded out the top ten. However, in the qualifying session, only 43 cars attempted to qualify (Setzer and Derrike Cope withdrew). Following the session, McMurray commented, "We've had really good cars. It just seems like we've had really bad luck, so I'm hoping. ... I've always been a little superstitious of green, and I showed up, and I saw my car, and I was like, 'Wow, that's not really what I was expecting to see.' But I hope this turns it around for us."

== Results ==
=== Qualifying ===
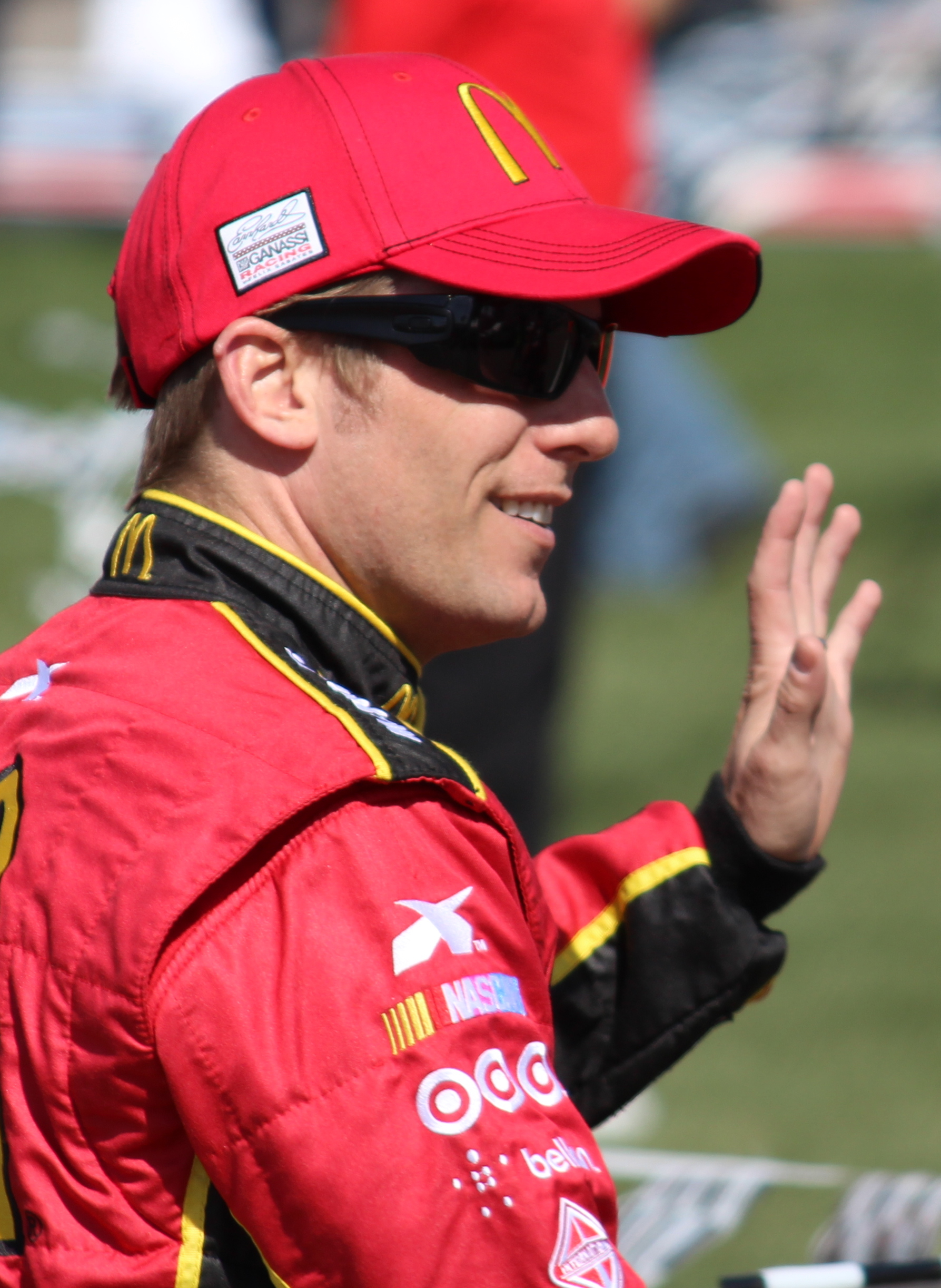
Jamie McMurray scored the pole position.

Grid	Car	Driver	Team	Manufacturer	Time	Speed
1	1	Jamie McMurray	Earnhardt Ganassi Racing	Chevrolet	19.621	96.509
2	39	Ryan Newman	Stewart–Haas Racing	Chevrolet	19.655	96.342
3	4	Kasey Kahne	Red Bull Racing Team	Toyota	19.665	96.293
4	20	Joey Logano	Joe Gibbs Racing	Toyota	19.680	96.220
5	11	Denny Hamlin	Joe Gibbs Racing	Toyota	19.726	95.995
6	43	A. J. Allmendinger	Richard Petty Motorsports	Ford	19.735	95.951
7	47	Bobby Labonte	JTG Daugherty Racing	Toyota	19.745	95.951
8	00	David Reutimann	Michael Waltrip Racing	Toyota	19.755	95.854
9	29	Kevin Harvick	Richard Childress Racing	Chevrolet	19.761	95.825
10	78	Regan Smith	Furniture Row Racing	Chevrolet	19.768	95.791
11	18	Kyle Busch	Joe Gibbs Racing	Toyota	19.769	95.786
12	5	Mark Martin	Hendrick Motorsports	Chevrolet	19.784	95.714
13	83	Brian Vickers	Red Bull Racing Team	Toyota	19.788	95.694
14	6	David Ragan	Roush Fenway Racing	Ford	19.792	95.675
15	33	Clint Bowyer	Richard Childress Racing	Chevrolet	19.797	95.651
16	27	Paul Menard	Richard Childress Racing	Chevrolet	19.817	95.554
17	48	Jimmie Johnson	Hendrick Motorsports	Chevrolet	19.820	95.540
18	56	Martin Truex Jr.	Michael Waltrip Racing	Toyota	19.833	95.477
19	9	Marcos Ambrose	Richard Petty Motorsports	Ford	19.835	95.468
20	22	Kurt Busch	Penske Racing	Dodge	19.836	95.463
21	24	Jeff Gordon	Hendrick Motorsports	Chevrolet	19.843	95.429
22	2	Brad Keselowski	Penske Racing	Dodge	19.852	95.386
23	99	Carl Edwards	Roush Fenway Racing	Ford	19.875	95.275
24	17	Matt Kenseth	Roush Fenway Racing	Ford	19.879	95.256
25	21	Trevor Bayne	Wood Brothers Racing	Ford	19.879	95.256
26	88	Dale Earnhardt Jr.	Hendrick Motorsports	Chevrolet	19.894	95.184
27	42	Juan Pablo Montoya	Earnhardt Ganassi Racing	Chevrolet	19.908	95.118
28	14	Tony Stewart	Stewart–Haas Racing	Chevrolet	19.914	95.089
29	36	Dave Blaney	Tommy Baldwin Racing	Chevrolet	19.916	95.079
30	13	Casey Mears	Germain Racing	Toyota	19.932	19.932
31	38	Travis Kvapil	Front Row Motorsports	Ford	19.942	94.955
32	31	Jeff Burton	Richard Childress Racing	Chevrolet	20.002	94.671
33	16	Greg Biffle	Roush Fenway Racing	Ford	20.004	94.661
34	7	Robby Gordon	Robby Gordon Motorsports	Dodge	20.028	94.548
35	66	Michael McDowell	HP Racing	Toyota	20.044	94.472
36	34	David Gilliland	Front Row Motorsports	Ford	20.066	94.369
37	87	Joe Nemechek	NEMCO Motorsports	Toyota	20.100	94.209
38	09	Landon Cassill	Phoenix Racing	Chevrolet	20.135	94.045
39	60	Mike Skinner	Germain Racing	Toyota	20.171	93.877
40	32	Ken Schrader	FAS Lane Racing	Ford	20.228	93.613
41	37	Tony Raines	Front Row Motorsports	Ford	20.306	93.253
42	46	J. J. Yeley	Whitney Motorsports	Chevrolet	20.306	93.253
43	71	Hermie Sadler	TRG Motorsports	Chevrolet	20.640	91.744
Failed to qualify
WD	92	Dennis Setzer		Dodge		

=== Race ===
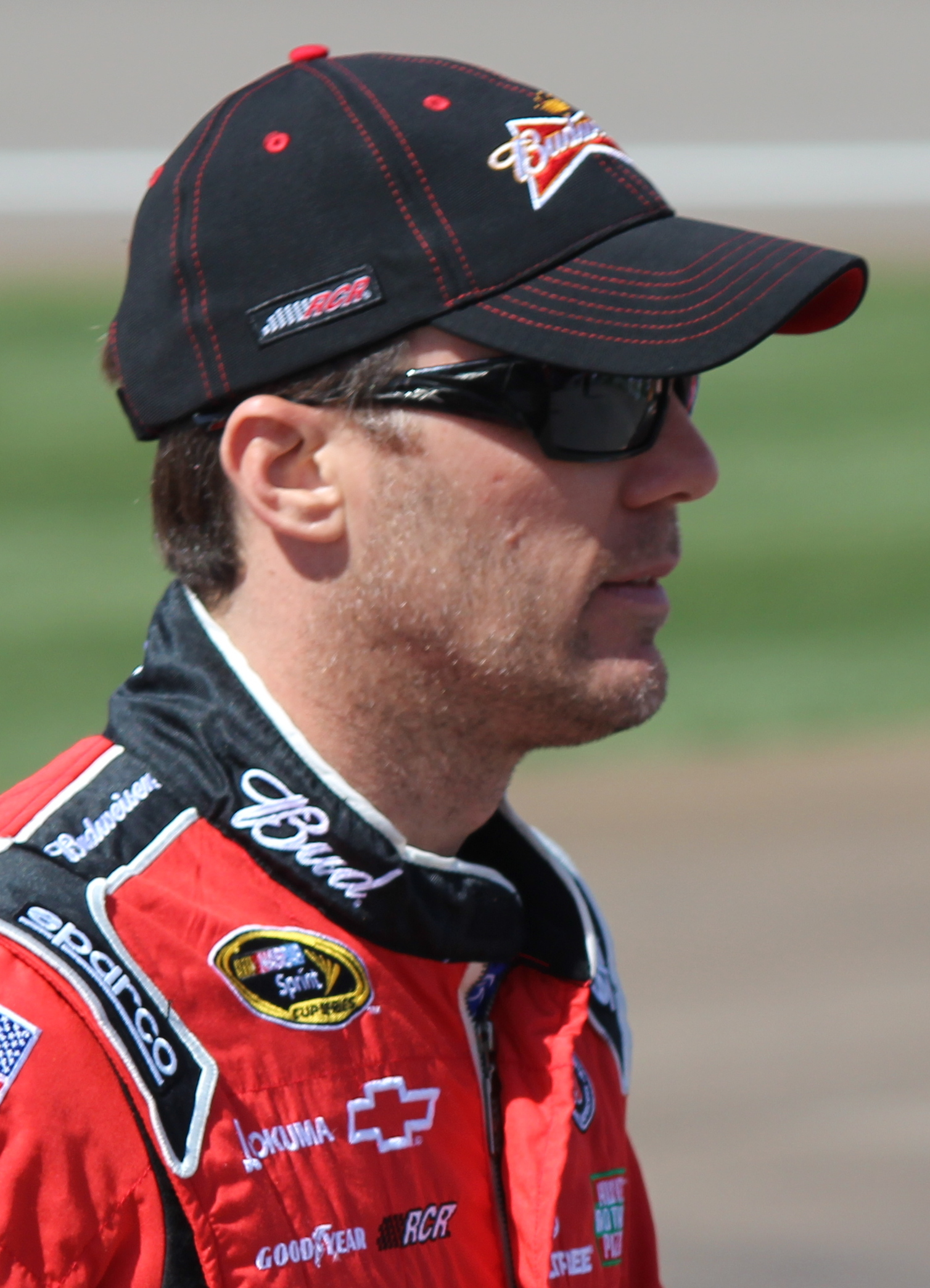
Kevin Harvick won the race, his second of the season.

Pos	Car	Driver	Team	Manufacturer	Laps run	Points
1	29	Kevin Harvick	Richard Childress Racing	Chevrolet	500	51
2	88	Dale Earnhardt Jr.	Hendrick Motorsports	Chevrolet	500	44
3	18	Kyle Busch	Joe Gibbs Racing	Toyota	500	45
4	42	Juan Pablo Montoya	Earnhardt Ganassi Racing	Chevrolet	500	40
5	24	Jeff Gordon	Hendrick Motorsports	Chevrolet	500	41
6	17	Matt Kenseth	Roush Fenway Racing	Ford	500	38
7	1	Jamie McMurray	Earnhardt Ganassi Racing	Chevrolet	500	39
8	6	David Ragan	Front Row Motorsports	Ford	500	36
9	33	Clint Bowyer	Richard Childress Racing	Chevrolet	500	37
10	5	Mark Martin	Hendrick Motorsports	Chevrolet	500	34
11	48	Jimmie Johnson	Hendrick Motorsports	Chevrolet	500	35
12	11	Denny Hamlin	Joe Gibbs Racing	Toyota	500	34
13	20	Joey Logano	Joe Gibbs Racing	Toyota	499	31
14	43	A.J. Allmendinger	Richard Petty Motorsports	Ford	499	32
15	00	David Reutimann	Michael Waltrip Racing	Toyota	499	29
16	22	Kurt Busch	Penske Racing	Dodge	499	28
17	83	Brian Vickers	Red Bull Racing Team	Toyota	499	27
18	99	Carl Edwards	Roush Fenway Racing	Ford	499	27
19	2	Brad Keselowski	Penske Racing	Dodge	498	25
20	39	Ryan Newman	Stewart–Haas Racing	Chevrolet	498	25
21	16	Greg Biffle	Roush Fenway Racing	Ford	498	23
22	32	Ken Schrader	FAS Lane Racing	Ford	497	22
23	7	Robby Gordon	Robby Gordon Motorsports	Dodge	497	21
24	31	Jeff Burton	Richard Childress Racing	Chevrolet	495	20
25	37	Tony Raines	Front Row Motorsports	Ford	493	19
26	09	Landon Cassill	Phoenix Racing	Chevrolet	493	0
27	47	Bobby Labonte	JTG Daugherty Racing	Toyota	489	17
28	71	Hermie Sadler	TRG Motorsports	Chevrolet	488	0
29	9	Marcos Ambrose	Richard Petty Motorsports	Ford	487	15
30	36	Dave Blaney	Tommy Baldwin Racing	Chevrolet	486	14
31	78	Regan Smith	Furniture Row Racing	Chevrolet	476	13
32	66	Michael McDowell	HP Racing	Toyota	470	12
33	34	David Gilliland	Front Row Motorsports	Ford	468	11
34	14	Tony Stewart	Stewart–Haas Racing	Chevrolet	462	10
35	21	Trevor Bayne	Wood Brothers Racing	Ford	460	0
36	13	Casey Mears	Germain Racing	Toyota	457	8
37	38	Travis Kvapil	Front Row Motorsports	Ford	443	0
38	27	Paul Menard	Richard Childress Racing	Chevrolet	261	6
39	4	Kasey Kahne	Red Bull Racing Team	Toyota	219	6
40	56	Martin Truex Jr.	Michael Waltrip Racing	Toyota	219	4
41	46	J.J. Yeley	Whitney Motorsports	Chevrolet	33	3
42	60	Mike Skinner	Germain Racing	Toyota	31	0
43	87	Joe Nemechek	NEMCO Motorsports	Toyota	25	0

== Standings after the race ==
Drivers' Championship standings

Pos	Driver	Points
1	Kyle Busch	219
2	Carl Edwards	214
3	Jimmie Johnson	207
4	Kurt Busch	205
5	Kevin Harvick	204

Manufacturers' Championship standings

Pos	Manufacturer	Points
1	Chevrolet	40
2	Toyota	37
3	Ford	35
4	Dodge	20

- Note: Only the top five positions are included for the Drivers' Championship.

Previous race: 2011 Auto Club 400	Sprint Cup Series; 2011 season	Next race: 2011 Samsung Mobile 500
