= Steal This Album =

Studio album by the Coup
- Released: November 10, 1998
- Genre: Hip-hop
- Length: 59:08
- Label: Dogday Records
- Producers: Boots Riley; DJ Pam the Funkstress; Edifice; Brother K

The Coup chronology
| Genocide & Juice (1994) | Steal This Album (1998) | Party Music (2001) |

Professional ratings
Review scores
| Source | Rating |
|---|---|
| AllMusic | 4.5/5 stars |
| Christgau's Consumer Guide | A |
| Hip Hop Connection | 5/5 stars |
| Pitchfork | 8.1/10 |
| Playlouder | 7/10 |
| RapReviews | 9/10 |
| Rolling Stone | 3.5/5 stars |
| Uncut | 4/5 stars |
| Wall of Sound | 91/100 |

Steal This Album is the third studio album by American hip-hop duo the Coup. It was released on Dogday Records on November 10, 1998. It peaked at number 37 on the Billboard Heatseekers Albums chart, as well as number 51 on the Top R&B/Hip-Hop Albums chart. The album's title is a nod to Steal This Book (1971) by social activist Abbie Hoffman.

In 2015, Fact placed it at number 13 on the "100 Best Indie Hip-Hop Records of All Time" list.

The 2002 digital re-release is titled Steal This Double Album, and contains bonus tracks.

== Track listing ==
| No. | Title | Length |
|---|---|---|
| 1. | "The Shipment" | 4:27 |
| 2. | "Me and Jesus the Pimp in a '79 Granada Last Night" | 7:10 |
| 3. | "20,000 Gun Salute" | 3:59 |
| 4. | "Busterismology" | 5:02 |
| 5. | "Cars & Shoes" | 4:38 |
| 6. | "Breathing Apparatus" (featuring E-Roc) | 4:27 |
| 7. | "U.C.P.A.S." (featuring F.T.S.) | 4:20 |
| 8. | "Pizza Man (Skit)" | 0:30 |
| 9. | "The Repo Man Sings for You" (featuring Del tha Funkee Homosapien) | 4:26 |
| 10. | "Underdogs" | 6:07 |
| 11. | "Sneakin' In" | 1:40 |
| 12. | "Do My Thang (Skit)" | 2:56 |
| 13. | "Piss on Your Grave" | 5:27 |
| 14. | "Fixation" | 3:59 |

Steal This Double Album (2002 reissue edition) bonus tracks
| No. | Title | Length |
|---|---|---|
| 15. | "What the Po-Pos Hate" | 3:43 |
| 16. | "Swervin" | 3:42 |

Steal This Double Album (2002 reissue edition) bonus disc
| No. | Title | Length |
|---|---|---|
| 1. | "Live Performance" | 73:42 |

== Charts ==
| Chart | Peak position |
|---|---|
| US Heatseekers Albums (Billboard) | 37 |
| US Top R&B/Hip-Hop Albums (Billboard) | 51 |
