= Genocide & Juice =

Studio album by the Coup
- Released: October 18, 1994
- Genres: Hip-hop; political hip-hop
- Length: 51:34
- Label: Wild Pitch
- Producer: Boots Riley

The Coup chronology
Kill My Landlord (1993)	Genocide & Juice (1994)	Steal This Album (1998)

Professional ratings
Review scores
Source	Rating
AllMusic	4/5 stars
Robert Christgau	(1-star Honorable Mention)

Genocide & Juice is the second studio album by American hip-hop group the Coup. It was released on Wild Pitch Records in October 1994. It peaked at number 27 on the Billboard Heatseekers Albums chart, as well as number 62 on the Top R&B/Hip-Hop Albums chart.

The album's title is a reference to the cocktail "gin and juice", made famous by Snoop Dogg's song of the same name, which was released nine months prior.

== Track listing ==
No.	Title	Length
1.	"Intro (G-Nut Talks Shit from the Gut)"	0:54
2.	"Fat Cats, Bigga Fish"	5:54
3.	"Pimps (Free Stylin' at the Fortune 500 Club)"	5:05
4.	"Takin' These"	4:41
5.	"Hip 2 tha Skeme"	5:40
6.	"Gunsmoke"	4:02
7.	"This One's a Girl"	0:37
8.	"The Name Game"	5:37
9.	"360 Degrees"	2:14
10.	"Hard Concrete"	4:20
11.	"Santa Rita Weekend (featuring E-40, Spice 1, E-Roc)"	4:54
12.	"Repo Man"	3:07
13.	"Interrogation"	4:48
14.	"Outro"	0:40

== Charts ==
Chart	Peak position
US Heatseekers Albums (Billboard)	27
US Top R&B/Hip-Hop Albums (Billboard)	62
