= Kill My Landlord =

Studio album by the Coup
- Released: 1993
- Genre: Hip-hop; political hip-hop
- Length: 61:02
- Label: Wild Pitch
- Producer: Boots Riley

The Coup chronology
Kill My Landlord (1993)	Genocide & Juice (1994)

Kill My Landlord is the debut studio album by American hip-hop group the Coup. It was released on Wild Pitch Records in 1993. The album peaked at number 83 on the Billboard Top R&B Albums chart.

== Critical reception ==
Professional ratings
Review scores
Source	Rating
AllMusic	3/5 stars
Robert Christgau	(2-star Honorable Mention)

The Village Voice noted that the Coup's "fierce individuality and self-mockery mark them as De La descendants".

== Track listing ==
No.	Title	Length
1.	"Dig It!"	4:19
2.	"Not Yet Free"	6:15
3.	"Fuck a Perm"	0:46
4.	"The Coup"	4:28
5.	"I Know You"	6:31
6.	"I Ain't the Nigga"	4:32
7.	"Last Blunt"	5:24
8.	"Funk"	6:11
9.	"Liberation of Lonzo Williams"	4:52
10.	"Pam's Song"	2:06
11.	"Fo da Money"	5:39
12.	"Foul Play"	4:02
13.	"Kill My Landlord"	6:18

== Charts ==
Chart	Peak position
US Top R&B/Hip-Hop Albums (Billboard)	83
