= Sorry to Bother You (album) =

Studio album by the Coup
- Released: October 30, 2012
- Genres: Alternative hip-hop; funk rock; alternative rock; rap rock; political hip-hop; punk rock
- Length: 46:11
- Label: Anti-
- Producers: Boots Riley; Damion Gallegos

The Coup chronology
Pick a Bigger Weapon (2006)	Sorry to Bother You (2012)

Professional ratings
Aggregate scores
Source	Rating
Metacritic	80/100
Review scores
Source	Rating
AllMusic	4/5 stars
The A.V. Club	A−
Chicago Tribune	3.5/4 stars
Robert Christgau	A−
Consequence of Sound	C+
Pitchfork	7.2/10
PopMatters	7/10
Rolling Stone	3/5 stars
Spin	7/10
Under the Radar	7.5/10 stars

Sorry to Bother You is the sixth and final studio album by American hip-hop group the Coup. It was released on Anti- on October 30, 2012.

== Background ==
In 2012, the Coup's frontman Boots Riley completed the first draft of the screenplay for the 2018 film Sorry to Bother You. While he would later direct the film from that screenplay, Riley had no way to produce the film in 2012. As such, the Coup made the album of the same name, which was inspired by the screenplay.

== Music videos ==
Music videos were created for "The Magic Clap", "Land of 7 Billion Dances", "The Guillotine", and "Your Parents' Cocaine".

== Critical reception ==
At Metacritic, which assigns a weighted average score out of 100 to reviews from mainstream critics, the album received an average score of 80 based on 15 reviews, indicating "generally favorable reviews".

PopMatters placed it at number 5 on the "Best Hip-Hop of 2012" list. Todd Martens of Los Angeles Times placed it at number 8 on the "Best of 2012 Pop Music: Albums" list.

== Track listing ==
No.	Title	Length
1.	"The Magic Clap"	3:12
2.	"Strange Arithmetic"	4:05
3.	"Your Parents' Cocaine" (featuring Justin Sane from Anti-Flag)	2:32
4.	"The Gods of Science"	3:06
5.	"My Murder, My Love"	3:32
6.	"You Are Not a Riot (An RSVP from David Siquieros to Andy Warhol)"	3:14
7.	"Land of 7 Billion Dances"	3:15
8.	"Violet"	4:34
9.	"This Year"	4:04
10.	"We've Got a Lot to Teach You, Cassius Green"	4:42
11.	"Long Island Iced Tea, Neat" (featuring Japanther)	2:04
12.	"The Guillotine"	4:45
13.	"WAVIP" (featuring Das Racist & Killer Mike)	3:06

== Charts ==
Sales chart performance for Sorry to Bother You
Chart	Peak position
US Heatseekers Albums (Billboard)	7
US Independent Albums (Billboard)	48
US Top Rap Albums (Billboard)	22
US Tastemakers (Billboard)	23
US Vinyl Albums (Billboard)	9
