= Woodstock Nation =

People involved in 1960s counterculture

The term Woodstock Nation refers specifically to the attendees of the original 1969 Woodstock Music and Arts Festival. The phrase was coined by Yippie activist Abbie Hoffman, and was later used as the title of his book Woodstock Nation: A Talk-Rock Album describing his experiences at the festival.

More generally, however, the term is used as a catch-all phrase for those individuals of the baby boomer generation in the United States who subscribed to the values of the American counterculture of the 1960s and early 1970s. The term is often interchangeable with hippie.
