= Party Music =

Studio album by the Coup
- Released: November 6, 2001
- Genres: Hip-hop; electro; funk
- Length: 53:18
- Label: 75 Ark
- Producers: Boots Riley; Tahir

The Coup chronology
Steal This Album (1998)	Party Music (2001)	Pick a Bigger Weapon (2006)

Rejected cover
- Originally intended album cover

Singles from Party Music
- 1. "5 Million Ways to Kill a C.E.O." Released: 2001

Party Music is the fourth studio album by American hip-hop group the Coup, released on 75 Ark on November 6, 2001. It was re-released on Epitaph Records in 2004.

== Album cover ==
The original cover of the album, created in June 2001, depicted Boots Riley and Pam the Funkstress destroying the twin towers of the World Trade Center using what appeared to be a detonator. The apparent detonator was actually an electronic tuner. The album's release had already been pushed back from early September to November by the time the Twin Towers were destroyed during the September 11 attacks. The printing of the original cover was scheduled to begin on September 11; after the attacks, the label halted the print run and began work on new artwork, over the objections of Boots Riley, who argued for keeping the original design.

In a 2001 interview with Seattle newspaper The Stranger, Boots Riley spoke about his fight to keep the album cover following the events of September 11:

There's been a whitewash in the media over the past couple days over what the U.S.'s role in the world is, and the fact that they kill hundreds of thousands of people per year to protect profit. Now how can I get to the point where I could be saying that on the world stage, and interrupt the lies that CBS, CNN, NBC, and everyone is saying? In my view, that [would be] by keeping the cover. Not because I think by looking at the cover you get all of this message that I'm telling you, but as a way to have a platform to interrupt the stream of lies that are being told right now.

In 2024, the original cover was listed in Rolling Stone in a list of "The 50 Worst Album Covers of All Time" as the 46th worst album cover due to the attempt to keep it in spite of 9/11.

== Critical reception ==
Professional ratings
Aggregate scores
Source	Rating
Metacritic	85/100
Review scores
Source	Rating
AllMusic	4/5 stars
Alternative Press	8/10
Blender	4/5 stars
The Guardian	3/5 stars
Pitchfork	7.9/10
Spin	9/10
The Village Voice	A

At Metacritic, which assigns a weighted average score out of 100 to reviews from mainstream critics, the album received an average score of 85 based on 11 reviews, indicating "universal acclaim".

Spin included it on the "20 Best Albums of 2001" list.

== Track listing ==
No.	Title	Length
1.	"Everythang"	3:52
2.	"5 Million Ways to Kill a C.E.O."	5:26
3.	"Wear Clean Draws"	4:51
4.	"Ghetto Manifesto" (featuring T-Kash)	6:20
5.	"Get Up" (featuring Dead Prez)	4:02
6.	"Tight"	3:12
7.	"Ride the Fence"	3:43
8.	"Nowalaters"	4:42
9.	"Pork and Beef" (featuring T-Kash)	4:00
10.	"Heven Tonite"	3:51
11.	"Thought About It 2"	4:38
12.	"Lazymuthafucka"	4:41

== Personnel ==
Credits adapted from liner notes.

The Coup

- Boots Riley – vocals, claps, snaps, claves, synthesizer, drum programming, production, recording
- Pam the Funkstress – turntables

Additional musicians

- Mike Tiger – synthesizer (1, 2, 4, 6, 7, 8, 11), clavinet (3, 7, 8, 11), piano (4, 6, 8, 10, 12), keyboard bass (9, 12), organ (12)
- David James – guitar (1, 4, 7, 8, 9, 10, 12)
- Martin Luther – vocals (2, 3, 5, 11)
- Elijah Hassan – bass guitar (2, 4, 7, 10)
- Guy Hubbard – whistle (3)
- Keith McArthur – bass guitar (3, 8)
- T-Kash – vocals (4, 9)
- Alisha Calhoun – violin (4)
- M1 – vocals (5)
- Stick – vocals (5)
- Tahir – keyboards (5), drum programming (5), production (5)
- Lenon Honor – vocals (6, 12)
- Funkyman – vocals (6, 7)
- Keneice – vocals (8, 10)
- Josh Jones – congas (10), bells (10)

Technical personnel

- Bob Brown – recording
- Matt Kelley – recording, mixing
- Tony Dawsey – mastering
- Victor Hall – cover image
- Brandon Arnovick – package design
