= Pick a Bigger Weapon =

Studio album by the Coup
- Released: April 25, 2006
- Genres: Hip-hop; rap rock; funk
- Length: 65:13
- Label: Epitaph
- Producers: Boots Riley; Organized Elements

The Coup chronology
Party Music (2001)	Pick a Bigger Weapon (2006)	Sorry to Bother You (2012)

Pick a Bigger Weapon is the fifth studio album by American hip-hop group the Coup. It was released on Epitaph Records on April 25, 2006. It peaked at number 24 on the Billboard Heatseekers Albums chart, as well as number 35 on the Independent Albums chart.

== Critical reception ==
Professional ratings
Aggregate scores
Source	Rating
Metacritic	78/100
Review scores
Source	Rating
AllMusic	3.5/5 stars
The A.V. Club	A−
Robert Christgau	A
Entertainment Weekly	A−
Pitchfork	7.9/10
PopMatters	8/10 stars
Slant Magazine	3/5 stars
Stylus Magazine	C

At Metacritic, which assigns a weighted average score out of 100 to reviews from mainstream critics, the album received an average score of 78 based on 25 reviews, indicating "generally favorable reviews".

Rolling Stone named it the 49th best album of 2006. ThoughtCo placed it at number 9 on the "Best Rap Albums of 2006" list.

== Track listing ==
No.	Title	Length
1.	"Bullets and Love (Introduction)" (featuring stic.man)	1:29
2.	"We Are the Ones"	4:15
3.	"Laugh/Love/Fuck"	3:46
4.	"My Favorite Mutiny" (featuring Black Thought and Talib Kweli)	4:35
5.	"IJusWannaLayArounAllDayInBedWithYou"	5:16
6.	"Head (of State)"	2:48
7.	"ShoYoAss"	6:20
8.	"Yes 'Em to Death"	1:17
9.	"Ass-Breath Killers"	3:00
10.	"Get That Monkey Off Your Back"	3:11
11.	"MindFuck (A New Equation)"	4:20
12.	"Two Enthusiastic Thumbs Down" (featuring Jello Biafra)	1:15
13.	"I Love Boosters!"	3:45
14.	"Tiffany Hall"	4:24
15.	"BabyLet'sHaveABabyBeforeBushDoSomethin'Crazy" (featuring Silk E)	4:23
16.	"Captain Sterling's Little Problem" (featuring Tom Morello)	4:31
17.	"The Stand"	6:37

== Personnel ==
Credits adapted from liner notes.

The Coup

- Boots Riley – vocals, claps, drum programming, production, recording, mixing
- Pam the Funkstress – turntables

Additional musicians

- Michael Aaberg – synthesizer (1, 2, 3, 4, 5, 6, 7, 9, 10), piano (4, 5, 7, 11, 16, 17), clavinet (7, 10), organ (10, 17)
- Steve Wyreman – guitar (1)
- IRS – vocals (2)
- Moses Kremer – guitar (2)
- Uriah Duffy – bass guitar (2, 11, 15)
- Oslem Asina – vocals (3)
- Silk E – vocals (3, 15)
- Reginald Brown – vocals (3)
- Dawn-Elissa Fischer – vocals (3, 5)
- Dave Council – bass guitar (3, 4, 10, 14), piano (13, 14), synthesizer (14)
- James Henry – congas (3), percussion (4)
- Black Thought – vocals (4)
- Talib Kweli – vocals (4)
- Rod Gadson – vocals (4)
- Viveca Hawkins – vocals (4, 9)
- Eric McFadden – guitar (4, 9, 10, 11)
- David James – guitar (5, 11, 14)
- Damion Gallegos – guitar (5), claps (5), recording
- John Payne – bass guitar (5)
- Damion Masterson – harmonica (5)
- Ben Barnes – viola (5, 14, 15), violin (5, 14, 15), cello (14)
- Rebekah Raff – harp (5)
- Brian Collier – drums (5)
- Degi Simmons – congas (5, 10)
- Kween – vocals (6, 17)
- Lawrence "L" Wiley – vocals (6, 16)
- Elijah Baker – bass guitar (6, 7, 13, 17)
- Reggie B. – vocals (7)
- B'nai Rebelfront – guitar (7)
- Dawud Allah – vocals (8)
- Jordan Rode – vocals (8)
- Butch – vocals (9)
- Alina Hubbard-Riley – vocals (10)
- stic.man – vocals (10)
- Dawud Allah – vocals (12)
- Jordan Rode – vocals (12), recording
- Jello Biafra – vocals (12)
- Jubu Smith – guitar (13, 14, 16)
- Myron Glasper – vocals (13, 14)
- D'wayne Wiggins – guitar (15)
- Reginald Brown – vocals (16)
- Tom Morello – guitar (16)
- Vernon Hall – bass guitar (16)
- Q Jackson – cymbal (17)
- Cameron Hunt – guitar (17)
- Pete Ortega – saxophone (17)
- Isaac Tena – trumpet (17)
- Organized Elements – drum programming (17), production (17)

Technical personnel

- Matt Kelley – recording, mixing
- Kenneth Hung – cover art

== Charts ==
Chart	Peak position
US Heatseekers Albums (Billboard)	24
US Independent Albums (Billboard)	35
