= Sorry to Bother You =

2018 film by Boots Riley

- Theatrical release poster
- Directed by: Boots Riley
- Written by: Boots Riley
- Produced by: Nina Yang Bongiovi; Kelly Williams; Jonathan Duffy; Charles D. King; George Rush; Forest Whitaker
- Starring: LaKeith Stanfield; Tessa Thompson; Jermaine Fowler; Omari Hardwick; Terry Crews; Patton Oswalt; David Cross; Danny Glover; Steven Yeun; Armie Hammer
- Cinematography: Doug Emmett
- Edited by: Terel Gibson
- Music by: Tune-Yards; The Coup
- Production companies: Significant Productions; MNM Creative; MACRO; Cinereach; The Space Program
- Distributed by: Annapurna Pictures (United States and Canada); Focus Features Universal Pictures (International)
- Release dates: January 20, 2018 (Sundance); July 6, 2018 (United States)
- Running time: 112 minutes
- Country: United States
- Language: English
- Budget: $3.2 million
- Box office: $18.3 million

Sorry to Bother You is a 2018 American science fiction black comedy film written and directed by musician Boots Riley in his directorial debut. It stars LaKeith Stanfield, Tessa Thompson, Jermaine Fowler, Omari Hardwick, Terry Crews, Patton Oswalt, David Cross, Danny Glover, Steven Yeun, and Armie Hammer. The film follows a young African-American telemarketer who adopts a "white voice" to succeed at his job, after which he is swept into a corporate conspiracy and must choose between chasing profit or joining his activist friends who are attempting to unionize.

Principal photography began in June 2017 in Oakland, California. Sorry to Bother You premiered at the 2018 Sundance Film Festival on January 20 and was theatrically released in the United States by Annapurna Pictures on July 6, 2018. Focus Features and Universal Pictures handled international distribution. The film received praise for its cast, story, and soundtrack, as well as Riley's writing and direction. It was a commercial success, grossing $18.3 million against a budget of $3.2 million.

== Plot ==
In a dystopian near future, Cassius "Cash" Green and his artist girlfriend Detroit live in the garage of Cash's uncle Sergio. Struggling to pay rent, Cash gets a job as a telemarketer for RegalView. He struggles with customers until his older co-worker Langston teaches him how to use his "white voice" and adopt a blithe, affluent persona during calls, at which Cash excels.

Cash's co-worker Squeeze forms a union and recruits Cash, Detroit, and their friend Sal. When Cash participates in a protest, he expects to be fired but is instead promoted to an elite "Power Caller" position within the company. In the luxurious Power Caller suite, the lead Power Caller known as Mr. _______ (Note: Every time he is mentioned in the film, Mr. _______'s name is replaced by a bleep censor and his name appears blanked out by underscores.) tells Cash to always use his white voice. He learns that RegalView secretly sells military arms and cheap labor from the megacorporation WorryFree, through which employees sign lifetime contracts to work and be housed in factories, i.e. slave labor.

Though Cash is initially uncomfortable with the job, he is celebrated at work and can now afford a new apartment and a flashy car while paying off Sergio's house, keeping him from joining WorryFree in the process. Through his newfound success, he initially improves his relationship with Detroit and boosts his sex life significantly. He stops participating in the union push and Detroit quits her RegalView job to avoid conflicting loyalties between the two, while secretly participating in the Left Eye Faction, an anti-WorryFree activist group. She eventually breaks up with Cash, arguing that his immoral job has changed him, while he insists he has the right to be proud of his success.

As Cash is escorted through the union's picket line one morning, a picketer throws a can of soda at his head and injures him. Footage of the incident becomes a popular Internet meme, and even the woman who threw the can profits from it when she signs a sponsorship with the soda brand she threw. Cash attends Detroit's art exhibit and artistic performance uninvited, at which she uses a white voice of her own. He tries to stop the event, but that only motivates Detroit to kick him out, and she later has "everything but sex" with Squeeze.

Cash is invited to a debaucherous party with WorryFree CEO Steve Lift, where he is goaded into rapping for the predominantly white guests. Later, in a private meeting, Steve offers Cash a powdered substance which Cash snorts, believing it is cocaine. Cash looks for the bathroom but takes a wrong turn and discovers a shackled half-horse, half-human hybrid who begs him for help. Steve explains that WorryFree plans to make their workers stronger, more obedient, and more profitable by transforming them into human-horse "Equisapiens" through snorting a powder that modifies their DNA. Cash fears that he just ingested the substance, but Steve assures him it was cocaine. Cash refuses an offer of $100 million to become an Equisapien for five years to act as a false revolutionary figure to keep the employees in line.

Cash discovers he dropped his phone when he encountered the Equisapiens, who recorded a plea for help with it and sent it to Detroit. Taking advantage of his infamy as a meme, he appears on the extremely popular television show I Got the Shit Kicked Out of Me, where he endures humiliations and beatings in order to share the video to spread the word about WorryFree's cruelty. The plan backfires: Equisapiens are hailed as a groundbreaking scientific advancement, a cult of personality develops around Steve, and WorryFree's stock price reaches an all-time high.

Cash apologizes to Squeeze, Sal, and Detroit, and rallies the union in a final stand against RegalView. He uses a security code from the Equisapiens' video to break into Steve's home. He goes to the picket line, where the police start a riot and detain him, but the Equisapiens overpower them and free him. Cash and Detroit reconcile and move back into Sergio's garage, once again poor but happy together. However, Cash suddenly starts to turn into an Equisapien, with Steve having lied to him about the cocaine. Sometime later, a fully transformed Cash leads a mob of other Equisapiens to Steve's house and breaks down the door.

== Cast ==
- LaKeith Stanfield as Cassius "Cash" Green
  - David Cross as Cash's white voice
- Tessa Thompson as Detroit, Cash's girlfriend
  - Lily James as Detroit's white voice
- Jermaine Fowler as Salvador
- Omari Hardwick as Mr. _______, the head Power Caller
  - Patton Oswalt as Mr. _______'s white voice
- Terry Crews as Sergio Green, Cash's uncle
- Danny Glover as Langston
  - Ryan Coursey as Langston's white voice (uncredited)
- Steven Yeun as "Squeeze", a union organizer
- Armie Hammer as Steve Lift, WorryFree CEO
- Kate Berlant as Diana DeBauchery
- Robert Longstreet as Anderson
- Michael X. Sommers as Johnny
- Forest Whitaker as First Equisapien / Demarius
- Rosario Dawson as Voice in Power Caller Elevator
- W. Kamau Bell as Other Man in Crowd

== Production ==
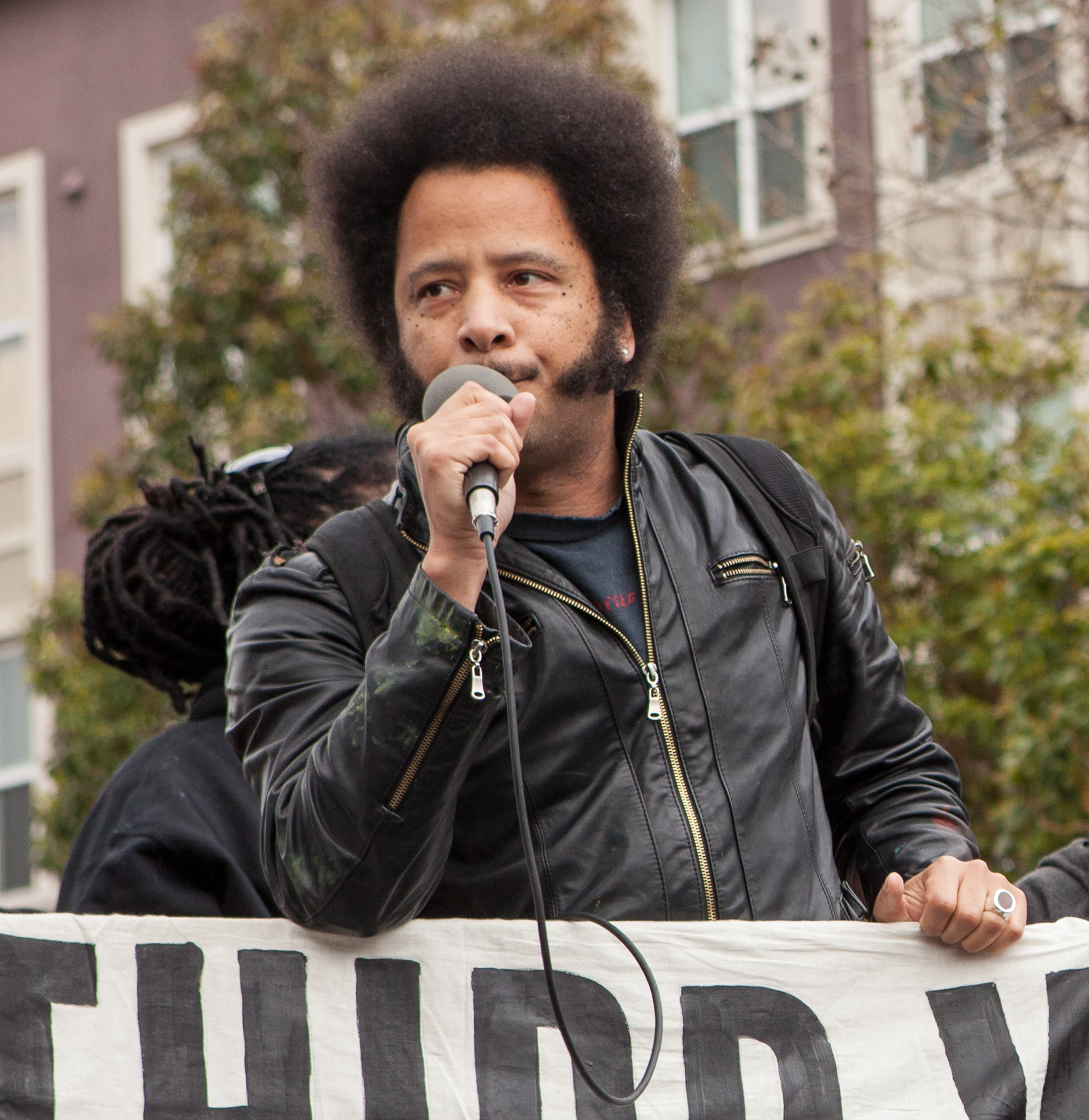
Riley speaks at a Martin Luther King Jr. Day rally in Emeryville, California, January 2016.

Writer and director Boots Riley described Sorry to Bother You as "an absurdist dark comedy with aspects of magical realism and science fiction inspired by the world of telemarketing". The screenplay for the film was inspired by his own time working as a telemarketer and telefundraiser in California, and his need to put on a different voice to find success. Riley finished the screenplay in 2012; with no means to produce it, he recorded an album of the same title with his band The Coup, inspired by the story. The screenplay was originally published in full as part of McSweeney's issue 48 in 2014.

In June 2017, it was announced that production would go forward on Sorry to Bother You, directed by Riley, and that LaKeith Stanfield, Tessa Thompson, and Steven Yeun had been cast in the film. Nina Yang Bongiovi and Forest Whitaker served as producers through their company Significant Productions, along with Jonathan Duffy, Kelly Williams, Charles D. King, and George Rush. Financing was provided by Significant Productions, MACRO, and Cinereach. The same month, Armie Hammer, Jermaine Fowler, Omari Hardwick, and Terry Crews joined the cast. In July 2017, Danny Glover, David Cross, and Patton Oswalt joined the cast, with Kate Berlant, Robert Longstreet, and Michael Sommers added later that month.

=== Filming ===
Principal photography ran in Oakland, California, from June 22 to July 30, 2017. The party at Steve Lift's mansion was filmed at the John Hopkins Spring Estate in Berkeley, California.

It was rumored that Steve Buscemi performed the "white voice" of Danny Glover's character Langston, but Riley revealed it was actually the film's sound engineer Ryan Coursey.

Following the film's premiere at Sundance, producer Megan Ellison gave Riley $200,000 for reshoots and an additional scene.

=== Music ===
The film score was composed and performed by Tune-Yards. Riley and his band The Coup recorded an original soundtrack for the film as well, which was released June 13, 2018. The first single, "OYAHYTT", featuring LaKeith Stanfield, was released July 13, 2018.

Sorry to Bother You: The Soundtrack track listing
No.	Title	Length
1.	"OYAHYTT" (featuring LaKeith Stanfield)	4:13
2.	"Hey Saturday Night" (featuring Tune-Yards)	4:14
3.	"Anitra’s Basement Tapes"	5:49
4.	"Whatthegirlmuthafuckinwannadoo" (featuring Janelle Monae)	3:42
5.	"Monsoon" (featuring Killer Mike)	3:57
6.	"Level It Up"	3:55
7.	"Out And Over/Sticky Sunrise" (featuring Janelle Monae)	3:20
8.	"We Need An Eruption"	2:49
9.	"Crawl Out The Water" (featuring E-40)	3:45

== Themes ==
Riley has said that the film offers a radical class analysis of capitalism, rather than a specific analysis of the U.S. under the presidency of Donald Trump as some had opined; he wrote the initial screenplay during Barack Obama's presidency, and the target was never any specific elected official or movement, but "the puppetmasters behind the puppets". While most of the final script remained the same, minimal changes were made to avoid appearing to critique Trump specifically, including removing a line where a character says "WorryFree is making America great again", which was written before Trump used the line in his 2016 presidential campaign.

The film's title has a double meaning, referencing both the phrase's use by telemarketers and its general usage when telling a person something they might not like to hear, such as the film's anti-capitalist message. Riley said, "When you're telling someone something that is different from how they view things, different from how they view the world, it feels like an annoyance or a bother. And that's where that comes from." The plot of a strike was used to reflect the need to "organize people in the workplace" and for workers to recognize their power.

The protagonist's name, Cassius Green, is an obvious reference to monetary value but can also be connected to Shakespeare's play Julius Caesar, where the character Cassius prioritizes his personal wellbeing over others and brands himself a "conniving sellout". Many of the names within this film represent meaning, such as Detroit being a reference to the city and referencing its capitalistic overtones.

== Release ==
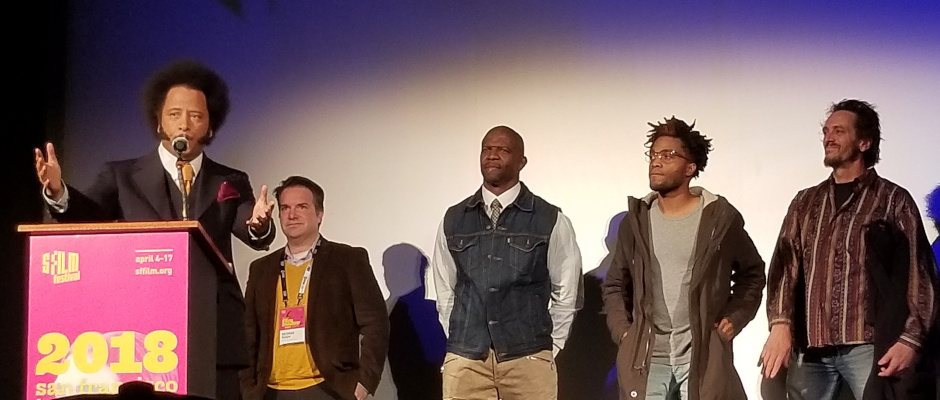
Riley presenting the film with cast members Terry Crews, Jermaine Fowler, and Michael Sommers

The film had its world premiere at the Sundance Film Festival on January 20, 2018. Shortly after, Annapurna Pictures acquired distribution rights. It also screened at South by Southwest on March 12, 2018. The film was initially scheduled to be released on June 29, 2018, but was pushed back a week to July 6, 2018, where it began with a limited release before expanding wider on July 13.

The film had difficulty getting international distribution. On September 18, 2018, Riley announced that Universal Pictures and Focus Features had picked up its international distribution rights. It premiered at the 62nd BFI London Film Festival on October 11, 2018, followed by a UK release on December 7, 2018.

Sorry to Bother You was released on digital copy on October 9, 2018, and on Blu-ray and DVD on October 23.

== Reception ==
=== Box office ===
As of December 14, 2018, Sorry to Bother You has grossed $17.5 million in the United States and Canada, and $792,464 in other territories, for a worldwide total of $18.3 million, against a production budget of $3.2 million.

The film earned $727,266 from 16 theaters in its limited opening weekend, for an average of $45,452, the fourth-best average of 2018. It finished 16th at the weekend box office. It had its wide release, in 805 theaters, on July 13, alongside the openings of Skyscraper and Hotel Transylvania 3: Summer Vacation, and was forecast to gross around $3.5 million over the weekend. The film made more on its first day of wide release ($1.5 million) than it had in its full week of limited release ($1.1 million). It went on to gross $4.3 million over the weekend, an increase of 485%, finishing 7th at the box office. The film was added to another 245 theaters in its third week of release and made $2.8 million, finishing 10th.

=== Critical response ===
On review aggregator Rotten Tomatoes, the film holds an approval rating of 93% based on 311 reviews, with an average rating of 7.7/10. The website's critical consensus reads, "Fearlessly ambitious, scathingly funny, and thoroughly original, Sorry to Bother You loudly heralds the arrival of a fresh filmmaking talent in writer-director Boots Riley." On Metacritic, the film has a weighted average score of 78 out of 100, based on 51 critics, indicating "generally favorable reviews". Audiences polled by PostTrak gave the film an 84% overall positive score and a 72% "definite recommend".

James Berardinelli of ReelViews said "Sorry to Bother You blends conventional comedy with political satire to produce a film that will generate laughter and a sense of discomfort in equal doses." David Sims of The Atlantic wrote, "The story's heightened reality works best when it's barely distinguishable from our own—though it starts to lose steam the more it drifts into fantasy. The movie is at times a mess, but a compelling one, and this debut from Boots Riley should herald a fascinating filmmaking career." Peter Debruge of Variety magazine praised the film, calling it "deliriously creative and ambitious to a fault", but expressed reservations about its second half: "As the movie's allegorical relation to real-world problems blurs, audiences are left to wonder what Riley's point is supposed to be." Jesse Hassenger of The A.V. Club described the film as "often wildly funny, and if its broad arc is familiar stuff about a down-on-his-luck everyman experiencing success but at what cost, at least the plot specifics are unpredictable". Randall Colburn of Consequence of Sound called it "a mess, but a glorious one" and said it "is fun until it's overwhelming, and Riley would likely have benefited from a good editor."

A.A. Dowd of The A.V. Club reviewed the film at the Sundance Film Festival and dissented from his peers, calling it "a scattershot, intermittently pointed satire whose jokes and insights land with about the same (in)frequency." Dowd was critical of the writing and direction: "There's a messy, first-draft quality to how the film fits said ideas together, and a general sloppiness to the execution, with Riley botching the timing on too many jokes ... Sorry To Bother You is plainly a first feature, and that's no insult: Even as some of the film's comedy fell flat for me, I distantly admired its something-to-prove chutzpah."

In 2025, it was one of the films voted for the "Readers' Choice" edition of The New York Times' list of "The 100 Best Movies of the 21st Century," finishing at number 281.

=== Accolades ===
Accolades for Sorry to Bother You
Award	Date of ceremony	Category	Recipient(s)	Result
Gotham Awards	November 26, 2018	Audience Award	Sorry to Bother You	Nominated
Gotham Awards	November 26, 2018	Best Actor	LaKeith Stanfield	Nominated
Gotham Awards	November 26, 2018	Bingham Ray Breakthrough Director	Boots Riley	Nominated
National Board of Review	January 8, 2019	Top Ten Independent Films	Sorry to Bother You	Won
Directors Guild of America Awards	February 2, 2019	Outstanding Directing – First-Time Feature Film	Boots Riley	Nominated
Independent Spirit Awards	February 23, 2019	Best First Feature	Boots Riley, Nina Yang Bongiovi, Jonathan Duffy, Charles D. King, George Rush, Forest Whitaker and Kelly Williams	Won
Independent Spirit Awards	February 23, 2019	Best Screenplay	Boots Riley	Nominated

== See also ==
- List of Afrofuturist films
- List of black films of the 2010s
- List of directorial debuts § 2018
