= Annapurna Pictures =

American independent media company

Annapurna Pictures, LLC
- Type: Private
- Industry: Film; Animation; Television; Video games; Theatre
- Founded: April 2, 2011; 15 years ago
- Founder: Megan Ellison
- Headquarters: Los Angeles, California, U.S.
- Key people: Megan Ellison (chairwoman and CEO)
- Services: Film production; Television production; Theatrical production; Video game publisher
- Divisions: Annapurna Interactive; Annapurna Animation; Annapurna Television; Annapurna Theatre
- Website: annapurna.com

Annapurna Pictures, LLC is an American independent media company founded by Megan Ellison on April 2, 2011, and based in Los Angeles, California. It is active in film, television, theatrical production, and video game publishing.

== History ==
Annapurna Pictures was founded in 2011 by Megan Ellison as a production and financing company focusing on high-end auteur-driven cinema. Ellison had attended University of Southern California’s film school for two semesters and then left in 2005 and traveled the world. Among her stops was Nepal, where she trekked in the Annapurna Range of the Himalayas, for which her production company is named.

By 2014, Annapurna had produced and/or financed the films Lawless, The Master, Killing Them Softly, Zero Dark Thirty, Spring Breakers, The Grandmaster, Her, Foxcatcher, and American Hustle, and was starting production on Joy, Sausage Party, Wiener-Dog, 20th Century Women, and Everybody Wants Some!!.

In December 2016, the company announced its new division, Annapurna Interactive, to produce, develop, and distribute video games. Annapurna Interactive has become a major publisher of independently made games.

In January 2017, the company announced it would begin distributing films, with the first being Detroit directed by Kathryn Bigelow. In May 2017, Plan B Entertainment and Annapurna announced a three-year production deal to partner on at least three films a year, with Annapurna handling distribution and marketing. As part of the deal, Annapurna received the rights to Adam McKay's film Vice starring Christian Bale as Dick Cheney. Annapurna then won domestic distribution rights for the James Bond series beating Warner Bros., Universal Pictures, 20th Century Fox, Paramount Pictures and Sony Pictures. In October 2017, Annapurna and MGM announced the formation of a US distribution joint venture in which each studio would release its films individually. Annapurna's distribution and marketing teams supported the MGM titles, which were distributed under the MGM banner while Annapurna-produced films continued to be distributed under its own banner.

In October 2018, Annapurna signed a music publishing deal with Warner/Chappell Music, which administered the studio's film and TV compositions and scores.

In February 2019, Annapurna and MGM rebranded and expanded their US distribution joint venture to release both MGM and Annapurna films under United Artists Releasing. After taking financial losses from distributing Vice, Detroit, and Destroyer, Annapurna had to leave Bombshell just two weeks before it would start production, and also unattached itself from Hustlers.

On March 4, 2023, it was revealed by The Hollywood Reporter that Amazon had shut down the operations of United Artists Releasing and folded it into MGM.

In August 2024, Annapurna announced a "strategic cooperation agreement" with video game developer Remedy Entertainment during which Annapurna will co-produce and co-finance Control 2, and will also develop film and television projects involving Remedy's Alan Wake and Control.

On September 12, 2024 news broke that the entire Annapurna Interactive Team of 25 resigned following a dispute with its owner to spin off the video-game division as an independent entity.

Annapurna produced The Testament of Ann Lee which received a 15 minute standing ovation at the Venice Film Festival. It was purchased by Searchlight Pictures in September 2025. A partnership between Moomins and Annapurna was announced the next month to release the first film based on the characters to be produced in the United States.

== Filmography ==
Year	Film title	Notes
2012	Lawless	co-production with FilmNation Entertainment, Benaroya Pictures, and Red Wagon Entertainment; distributed by the Weinstein Company
2012	The Master	co-production with JoAnne Sellar Productions, and Ghoulardi Film Company; distributed by the Weinstein Company; Nominated – Critics' Choice Movie Award for Best Picture; Nominated – Gotham Independent Film Award for Best Feature
2012	Killing Them Softly	co-production with Plan B Entertainment, Chockstone Pictures, 1984 Private Defense Contractors, and Inferno Entertainment; distributed by the Weinstein Company
2012	Zero Dark Thirty	co-production with First Light Productions; distributed by Columbia Pictures; National Board of Review Award for Best Film; National Board of Review: Top Ten Films; Nominated – AACTA Award for Best International Film; Nominated – Academy Award for Best Picture; Nominated – BAFTA Award for Best Film; Nominated – Critics' Choice Movie Award for Best Picture; Nominated – Golden Globe Award for Best Motion Picture – Drama; Nominated – Producers Guild of America Award for Best Theatrical Motion Picture; Nominated – Satellite Award for Best Film
2013	Spring Breakers	co-production with Hero Entertainment and Muse Productions; distributed by A24; Nominated – Venice Film Festival for Golden Lion
2013	The Grandmaster	co-production with Block 2 Pictures, Jet Tone Films, Sil-Metropole Organization, and Bona International Film Group; distributed by the Weinstein Company; Hong Kong Film Award for Best Film; Hong Kong Film Critics Society Award for Best Film; Nominated – Golden Horse Award for Best Feature Film
2013	Her	distributed by Warner Bros. Pictures; National Board of Review Award for Best Film; National Board of Review: Top Ten Films; Saturn Award for Best Fantasy Film; Nominated – Academy Award for Best Picture; Nominated – Critics' Choice Movie Award for Best Picture; Nominated – Golden Globe Award for Best Motion Picture – Musical or Comedy; Nominated – Producers Guild of America Award for Best Theatrical Motion Picture
2013	American Hustle	co-production with Atlas Entertainment; distributed by Columbia Pictures; Golden Globe Award for Best Motion Picture – Musical or Comedy; Screen Actors Guild Award for Outstanding Performance by a Cast in a Motion Picture; Nominated – AACTA Award for Best International Film; Nominated – Academy Award for Best Picture; Nominated – BAFTA Award for Best Film; Nominated – Critics' Choice Movie Award for Best Picture; Nominated – MTV Movie Award for Movie of the Year; Nominated – Producers Guild of America Award for Best Theatrical Motion Picture; Nominated – Satellite Award for Best Motion Picture; Nominated – Teen Choice Award for Choice Movie – Drama
2014	Foxcatcher	co-production with Likely Story; distributed by Sony Pictures Classics; Nominated – Golden Globe Award for Best Motion Picture – Drama; Nominated – Palme d'Or; Nominated – Producers Guild of America Award for Best Theatrical Motion Picture
2015	Terminator Genisys	co-production with Paramount Pictures and Skydance Media
2015	Joy	co-production with 20th Century Fox and Davis Entertainment; Nominated – Critics' Choice Movie Award for Best Comedy; Nominated – Golden Globe Award for Best Motion Picture – Musical or Comedy
2015	The Click Effect	co-production with Vrse
2016	Everybody Wants Some!!	distributed by Paramount Pictures; Nominated – Gotham Independent Film Award for Best Feature
2016	Wiener-Dog	co-production with Killer Films; distributed by Amazon Studios and IFC Films
2016	Sausage Party	co-production with Columbia Pictures, Point Grey Pictures, and Nitrogen Studios
2016	20th Century Women	produced by; distributed by A24; National Board of Review: Top Ten Independent Films; Nominated – Critics' Choice Movie Award for Best Acting Ensemble; Nominated – Golden Globe Award for Best Motion Picture – Musical or Comedy
2017	The Bad Batch	co-production with VICE Films and Human Stew Factory; distributed by Neon; Venice Film Festival for Special Jury Prize
2017	Detroit	co-production with First Light Productions and Page 1 NAACP Image Award for Outstanding Independent Motion Picture; Nominated – Black Reel Award for Outstanding Film; Nominated – NAACP Image Award for Outstanding Motion Picture
2017	Brad's Status	U.S. co-distribution with Amazon Studios only; produced by Plan B Entertainment and Sidney Kimmel Entertainment
2017	Professor Marston and the Wonder Women	U.S. theatrical distribution only; produced by Stage 6 Films, Topple and BoxMedia; Nominated – NAACP Image Award for Outstanding Independent Motion Picture
2017	Phantom Thread	co-production with Focus Features and Ghoulardi Film Company; National Board of Review: Top Ten Films; Nominated – Academy Award for Best Picture
2018	Sorry to Bother You	distribution only; produced by Significant Productions, MNM Creative, MACRO, Cinereach and the Space Program; National Board of Review: Top Ten Independent Films; Nominated – NAACP Image Award for Outstanding Independent Motion Picture
2018	The Sisters Brothers	co-production with Michael De Luca Productions, Why Not Productions, Page 114 Productions, and Apache Films; Nominated – César Award for Best Film; Nominated – Golden Lion
2018	If Beale Street Could Talk	co-production with Plan B Entertainment and Pastel Productions; Independent Spirit Award for Best Film; National Board of Review: Top Ten Films; Satellite Award for Best Motion Picture – Drama; Nominated – Black Reel Award for Outstanding Film; Nominated – Critics' Choice Movie Award for Best Picture; Nominated – Golden Globe Award for Best Motion Picture – Drama; Nominated – Gotham Independent Film Award for Best Feature; Nominated – NAACP Image Award for Outstanding Motion Picture
2018	The Ballad of Buster Scruggs	co-production with Netflix and Mike Zoss Productions; National Board of Review: Top Ten Films
2018	Destroyer	U.S. distribution only; produced by 30West and Automatik
2018	Vice	co-production with Plan B Entertainment and Gary Sanchez Productions; Nominated – AACTA Award for Best International Film; Nominated – Academy Award for Best Picture; Nominated – Critics' Choice Movie Award for Best Picture; Nominated – Critics' Choice Movie Award for Best Acting Ensemble; Nominated – Golden Globe Award for Best Motion Picture – Musical or Comedy; Nominated – Producers Guild of America Award for Best Theatrical Motion Picture
2019	Missing Link	U.S. distribution only; produced by Laika; Golden Globe Award for Best Animated Feature Film; Nominated – Academy Award for Best Animated Feature; Nominated – Annie Award for Best Animated Feature; Nominated – Critics' Choice Movie Award for Best Animated Feature; Nominated – Producers Guild of America Award for Best Animated Motion Picture
2019	Booksmart	co-production with Gloria Sanchez Productions; GLAAD Media Award for Outstanding Film – Wide Release; Independent Spirit Award for Best First Feature
2019	Where'd You Go, Bernadette	co-production with Color Force
2019	Hustlers	credit only; produced by Gloria Sanchez Productions, Nuyorican Productions and STX Entertainment; Nominated – Gotham Independent Film Award for Best Feature; Nominated – Satellite Awards for Best Motion Picture – Comedy or Musical
2019	Wounds	produced by Two & Two Pictures and AZA Film; distributed by Hulu
2019	Bombshell	credit only; produced by Bron Studios, Denver and Delilah Productions, Lighthouse Media & Management, Creative Wealth Media; distributed by Lionsgate; Nominated – GLAAD Media Award for Outstanding Film – Wide Release; Nominated – Satellite Awards for Best Motion Picture – Drama
2020	Kajillionaire	co-production with Plan B Entertainment; distributed by Focus Features
2022	On the Count of Three	North American co-distribution with Orion Pictures only; produced by Valparaiso Pictures, Werner Entertainment and Morningside Entertainment
2022	She Said	co-production with Plan B Entertainment; distributed by Universal Pictures
2023	Nimona	an Annapurna Animation film; co-production with Vertigo Entertainment and DNEG Animation; distributed by Netflix; first Annapurna Animation film Nominated – Academy Award for Best Animated Feature; Nominated – Annie Award for Best Animated Feature; Nominated – Critics' Choice Movie Award for Best Animated Feature
2023	Landscape with Invisible Hand	co-production with Plan B Entertainment; distributed by Metro-Goldwyn-Mayer
2024	Nightbitch	co-production with Searchlight Pictures, Bond Group Management, Archer Grey, and Defiant by Nature; distributed by Searchlight Pictures
2025	The Testament of Ann Lee	co-production with Mid March Media, Kaplan Morrison, Intake Films and Proton Cinema; distributed by Searchlight Pictures; Nominated – Golden Lion
2026	I Love Boosters	co-production with Ryder Picture Company and Savage Rose Films; distributed by Neon
2026	The Invite	co-production with FilmNation Entertainment and Permut Presentations; distributed by A24
TBA	Bitterroot	distributed by Universal Pictures

== Annapurna Animation ==
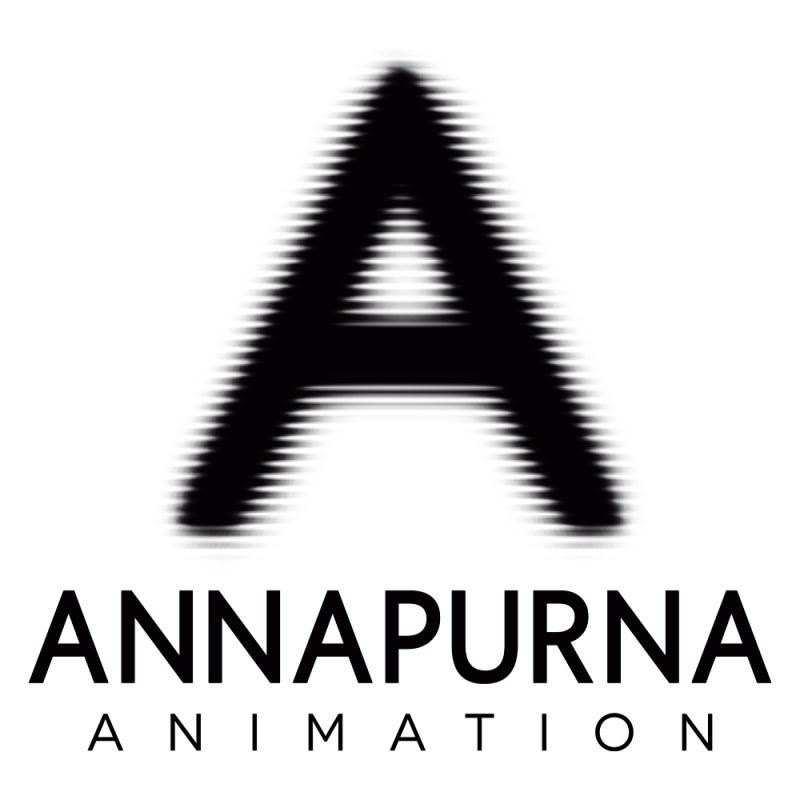
Annapurna Animation logo

Annapurna Animation is an American animation studio and division of Annapurna Pictures, founded by former Blue Sky Studios executives Robert L. Baird and Andrew Millstein on December 1, 2022 and based in North Stamford, Connecticut. The studio's first film, Nimona, was released on June 30, 2023, on Netflix. The film was originally to be released in 2022 by Blue Sky Studios, but due to Blue Sky Studios' shut down, the film was released in 2023 by Annapurna. In September 2023, Annapurna Animation announced an animated film adaptation of Annapurna Interactive's video game Stray was in development following the success of Nimona, with other games being considered to have potential adaptations.

=== Released ===
Release date	Film	Directors	Co-production	Animation services	Distribution
June 30, 2023	Nimona	Nick Bruno; Troy Quane	Vertigo Entertainment	DNEG Animation	Netflix

=== Upcoming ===
==== In development ====
Film	Director	Notes	Refs
Foo	Chris Wedge	—N/a	
Untitled film	Nick Bruno	—N/a	
Stray	TBA	Based on the game by BlueTwelve Studio	
Untitled Moomin film	Rebecca Sugar	Based on the series by Tove Jansson; Co-production with Moomin Characters and Pistor Productions	

== Annapurna Television ==
Annapurna Television is the television production company of Annapurna Pictures, launched on September 27, 2016, and was formerly headed by HBO executive Sue Naegle. In January 2017, it was reported that Annapurna Television would produce the Coen brothers' first TV project, The Ballad of Buster Scruggs.

Year	Title	Co-production	Network	Notes
2019	Search and Destroy	—N/a	Hulu	TV pilot
2019	Half-Empty	Endeavor Content; Amazon Studios	Amazon Prime Video	TV pilot
2019	Soundtrack	Random Acts Productions; 20th Century Fox Television	Netflix	Canceled after one season
2020	The Plot Against America	RK Films; Blown Deadline Productions	HBO	Miniseries
2020	Monsterland	Two & Two Pictures; Port Orchard Productions	Hulu	Canceled after one season
2021	Hot Pink	—N/a	Amazon Prime Video	TV pilot
2022	Pam & Tommy	Limelight Pictures; Point Grey Pictures; The Robert Siegel-Jen Cohn Company	Hulu	Miniseries
2022	The Staircase	Emipop; What's Up Films	HBO Max	Miniseries
2022	I Love That for You	Semi-Formal Productions; The First Todd; Say Mama; Go Balloons; Showtime Networks	Showtime	Canceled after one season
2023	Paul T. Goldman	Point Grey Pictures; Lionsgate Television; Swindle; Caviar	Peacock	Miniseries
2023	Dead Ringers	Morgan Creek Entertainment; Astral Projection; Amazon Studios	Amazon Prime Video	Miniseries
2023	The Changeling	Dela Revoluciøn; August 17; Apple Studios	Apple TV+	Canceled after one season
2024–2025	Sausage Party: Foodtopia	Point Grey Pictures; Sony Pictures Television; Amazon MGM Studios	Amazon Prime Video	Animated television series; Canceled after two seasons

== Annapurna Theatre ==
Annapurna Theatre produces plays and live shows on and off-Broadway, and on London's West End.

Show date(s)	Title	Notes
2018–2019	Nine Night	
2018–2019	Network	
2019	Home I'm Darling	
2019–ongoing	American Utopia	Also viewable in film format from HBO Max.
2019	The Curious Incident of the Dog in the Night-Time	Also viewable in film format from National Theatre Live.
2019	Fleabag	Also viewable in film format from National Theatre Live.
2019–ongoing	The Lehman Trilogy	Also viewable in film format from National Theatre Live.
2020	Death of a Salesman	
2020	Betrayal	
2021–ongoing	Company	
2021–ongoing	A Strange Loop	

== Reception ==
Some of the films produced by the company have received widespread critical acclaim. In 2013 alone, Her, American Hustle and The Grandmaster received a combined seventeen Academy Award nominations. Commercially, results have been mixed. Some films, such as The Master, Foxcatcher, Joy, Detroit and Vice, did not recoup their budgets while others, including Zero Dark Thirty, Sausage Party and American Hustle, grossed more than $100 million, with the latter earning more than $250 million worldwide.
