= Y2K (2024 film) =

2024 American horror comedy film by Kyle Mooney

- Theatrical release poster
- Directed by: Kyle Mooney
- Written by: Kyle Mooney; Evan Winter
- Produced by: Evan Winter; Jonah Hill; Matt Dines; Allison Goodwin; Christopher Storer; Cooper Wehde
- Starring: Jaeden Martell; Rachel Zegler; Julian Dennison; The Kid Laroi; Fred Durst
- Cinematography: Bill Pope
- Edited by: David Marks
- Music by: Danny Bensi; Saunder Jurriaans
- Production companies: A24; Strong Baby Productions; American Light & Fixture
- Distributed by: A24
- Release dates: March 9, 2024 (SXSW); December 6, 2024 (United States)
- Running time: 92 minutes
- Country: United States
- Language: English
- Budget: $15 million
- Box office: $4.5 million

Y2K is a 2024 American horror comedy film directed by Kyle Mooney and written by Mooney and Evan Winter. It stars Jaeden Martell, Rachel Zegler, Julian Dennison, The Kid Laroi, and Fred Durst, with Lachlan Watson, Daniel Zolghadri, Mason Gooding, Lauren Balone, and Eduardo Franco appearing in supporting roles. It follows a group of high school students who attempt to survive when the year 2000 problem causes all technology worldwide to gain sentience and turn against humanity.

Y2K had its world premiere at South by Southwest on March 9, 2024, and was released theatrically in the United States by A24 on December 6. The film received mixed reviews from critics and grossed $4.5 million.

== Plot ==
In 1999, best friends Eli and Danny discuss plans for New Year's Eve. Eli has a crush on his classmate Laura, and Danny encourages him to kiss her at midnight. They join Laura and her friends Trevor, Madison, and Raleigh at a party held by Soccer Chris, who is also interested in Laura. At midnight, Eli watches in dismay as Chris and Laura kiss until the power suddenly goes out.

As a student is found dead with a piece of a fan lodged in his head, a toy car moves on its own and kills Trevor by burning his face with a hairspray can and lighter. The terrified partygoers realize that all electrical devices have become autonomous and hostile. They attempt to leave, but many are gruesomely killed. In the ensuing chaos, a VCR smashes Madison's head with a VHS tape, Chris' head is melted by a microwave, and a Tamagotchi drills through Raleigh's head. Eli, Danny, and Laura escape with juvenile delinquents Farkas, CJ, and Ash, but Danny is fatally impaled by a blade and Farkas dies when he hits the ground while attempting to be cool on his skates.

The group go to an old mill without electricity, while the machines kill several residents throughout the town. They also find VHS store clerk Garrett and Laura's ex-boyfriend Jonas, and learn the threat is a collective consciousness of all electronic devices worldwide planning to enslave humanity. Laura successfully creates a kill code to shut down the algorithm, now dubbing itself the "Amalgamation", but a computer attacks her. Eli douses it in water, shutting it down. The group is then cornered by the Amalgamation, who is using electronics to make itself bigger. Garrett tries to fend it off, but is decapitated. The group hide in a portable toilet and ride it down a hill. They take refuge in the VHS store and meet musician Fred Durst, whom they encourage to join.

The group arrives at the local high school where, they learn, the machines are due to a new Internet connection installed. They sneak inside and discover the townspeople have been reduced to mindless slaves by brain-implanted chips. CJ sacrifices himself to save Fred from a machine while the group learn the Amalgamation has now grown to a monstrous size and is forcing people inside it, converting them to the aforementioned slaves. Fred, Ash, and Jonas distract the machines guarding the townspeople to let Laura make her way into the Amalgamation, but it electrocutes her. Eli arrives in time to save Laura and attempts to insert the kill code himself, but fails to do so as the Amalgamation keeps electrocuting and taunting them. Eli then uses a condom Danny had given him earlier and wraps it around Laura's hand like a protective glove. While Fred, Ash, and Jonas continue distracting the machines, Eli and Laura successfully insert the kill code, shutting down the algorithm worldwide and destroying the Amalgamation. Eli shares a kiss with Laura and they reunite with the surviving townspeople as dawn breaks.

Five years later in 2005, a now college-aged Eli, Laura, and Ash visit their friends' graves. As they leave the cemetery, Ash's new iPod starts to glitch, revealing that the algorithm has not been fully destroyed.

== Cast ==
- Jaeden Martell as Eli
- Rachel Zegler as Laura
- Julian Dennison as Danny
- The Kid Laroi as Soccer Chris
- Lachlan Watson as Ash
- Daniel Zolghadri as CJ
- Mason Gooding as Jonas
- Lauren Balone as Raleigh
- Eduardo Franco as Farkas
- Alicia Silverstone as Robin
- Tim Heidecker as Howard
- Miles Robbins as Nugz
- Maureen Sebastian as Cheryl
- Fred Durst as himself

In addition, the film's director and co-writer, Kyle Mooney, portrays Garrett.

== Production ==
It was announced in early March 2023 that Kyle Mooney would direct Y2K for A24. Jaeden Martell, Julian Dennison, Rachel Zegler, Lachlan Watson, Mason Gooding, The Kid Laroi, Eduardo Franco, Miles Robbins, Alicia Silverstone, Tim Heidecker, and Daniel Zolghadri joined the cast. Additionally, Weta Workshop worked on the effects for the film. In April 2023, Sebastian Chacon and Lauren Balone joined the cast. Jenna Ortega, Melanie Lynskey, and Fred Hechinger were also considered for the film.

Principal photography began in April 2023 in Ringwood, New Jersey. The following month, filming continued in Ringwood and Chatham Borough and in Clark at the recreation center before wrapping.

== Music ==
Y2K

Soundtrack album by various artists
- Released: January 17, 2025
- Label: A24 Music

The soundtrack for Y2K comprises a number of songs from the 1990s; the soundtrack album was released on CD on January 17, 2025.

Y2K soundtrack track listing
No.	Title	Writer(s)	Performer(s)	Length
1.	"Praise You"	Camille D. Yarbrough; Norman Cook	Fatboy Slim
2.	"Tubthumping"	Alice Nutter; Allan Whalley; Darren Hamer; Dunstan Bruce; Judith Abbott; Louise Watts; Nigel Hunter; Paul Greco	Rachel Zegler, Lachlan Watson, Daniel Zolghadri, and Jaeden Martell
3.	"Candy"	Denise Rich; Denny V; Dave Katz	Mandy Moore
4.	"9 PM (Till I Come)" (radio edit)	André Tanneberger; Yolanda Rivera Garrido; Dennis Ferrer; Julio Posadas Gilabert	ATB
5.	"Thong Song"	Desmond Child; Mark Althavan Andrews; Marquis Collins; Tim Kelley; Joseph Paul Longo; Bob Robinson; Robi Rosa	Julian Dennison
6.	"Break Stuff"	William Frederick Durst; Leor Dimant; Wesley Louden Borland; John Everett Otto; Sam Rivers; Brendan O'Brien	Limp Bizkit
7.	"93 'til Infinity"	Billy Cobham; Adam Carter; Opio Lindsey; Tajai Massey; Damani Thompson	Souls of Mischief
8.	"Freak on a Leash"	Jonathan Davis; Reginald Arvizu; Brian Welch; David Silveria; James Shaffer	Korn
9.	"6 Underground"	Liam Howe; Ian Pickering; Chris Corner; John Barry	Sneaker Pimps
10.	"Back at One"	Brian McKnight	Brian McKnight
11.	"Faith"	George Michael	Fred Durst
12.	"Ash and CJ Swings Freestyle"		Lachlan Watson and Daniel Zolghadri
13.	"Closing Time"	Dan Wilson	Semisonic

== Release ==
Y2K had its world premiere at South by Southwest on March 9, 2024. It was released theatrically in the United States by A24 on December 6, 2024.

=== Home media ===
The film was released video on demand on December 24, 2024.

== Reception ==
=== Box office ===
In the United States and Canada, Y2K was released alongside Werewolves and Pushpa 2: The Rule, and was projected to gross $3–5 million from 2,108 theaters in its opening weekend. The film made $923,110 on its first day, including $300,000 from Thursday night previews. It went on to debut to $2.1 million, finishing in eighth.

=== Critical response ===
On the review aggregator website Rotten Tomatoes, 42% of 105 critics' reviews are positive, with an average rating of 5.2/10. The website's consensus reads: "Y2K earns points for ambition and sheer audacity, even if it struggles to keep the laughs coming while maintaining a messy tonal blend." Metacritic, which uses a weighted average, assigned the film a score of 49 out of 100, based on 29 critics, indicating "mixed or average" reviews. Audiences polled by CinemaScore gave the film an average grade of "C–" on an A+ to F scale, while those surveyed by PostTrak gave it a 65% overall positive score, with 50% saying they would definitely recommend it.

Clint Worthington of RogerEbert.com gave the film one-and-a-half out of four stars, unfavorably comparing it to Brigsby Bear and concluding, "Y2K doesn't want to break stuff; it wants to dig it out of the trash and pine nostalgically for it. That's just not as interesting." Variety's Owen Gleiberman wrote, "Y2K turns out to be an attack-of-the-machines movie. Yet it's still very much a period-piece high-school comedy. So how well do the two go together? In my book, not very well... the last hour of it, the cheeky dystopian alien-tech horror farce, simply isn't very good."

Adrian Horton of The Guardian gave the film three out of five stars, calling it "a promising if wildly uneven debut that banks heavily, often successfully, on Mooney's penchant for late 90s nostalgia." Bloody Disgusting's Meagan Navarro gave it a score of four out of five, writing, "While some of its meaner horror impulses get largely forgotten by the end, it's tough to mind at all thanks to the nonstop, playful tone, killer soundtrack, wacky murder bots, and talent in front of and behind the camera that ensure a party worth rewinding the clock for."
