= Alex Asher Daniel =

American artist and composer

- Born: May 14, 1973 (age 53)
- Known for: Painting, drawing, music, film
- Musical career
- Origin: Southern California, Oakland, California, U.S.
- Genres: Electronic, ambient, R&B, hip-hop, experimental

Alex Asher Daniel (born May 14, 1973) is an American contemporary artist and composer. He uses a broad variety of materials including painting, sound installations, photography, drawing and film. A Los Angeles native, he has since lived and worked between London, New York City, and the Bay Area.

== Personal life ==
Born and raised in Pasadena, California, Daniel received his Bachelor of Fine Arts degree from the California College of the Arts in the San Francisco Bay Area, and was a fixture in the Oakland, California underground Hip-Hop scene in the 1990s.

In college Daniel was inspired to dive deeper into his studies of mysticism and the esoteric by his then English teacher beat poet Michael McClure.

== Career ==
As a visual artist Daniel has worked primarily in painting, portraiture, drawing, and collage. Inspired by nature, mysticism and the human form, Daniel's work explores meaning within the unseen space around his subjects and their relationship between the inner and outer world.

As a portraitist Daniel works specifically from live sittings spending time assessing the aura of the individual subject and incorporating the colors into his work.

His works reside in numerous collections worldwide including the Smithsonian National Portrait Gallery and has painted notable figures in contemporary culture including Lenny Kravitz, Charles Rangel, Jon Batiste, Tarana Burke, Phylicia Rashad, and Dame Miriam Rothschild.

As a music producer and composer he has collaborated and worked in various genres including Ambient, Rock, R&B and Electronica and remixed work for artists such as Maxwell, Warpaint, and UNKLE.

He has frequently worked in musique concrete and sound installation using found sounds to compose works. In 2019 he released the instrumental Ambient album Anima Mundi based on the five classical elements with proceeds of the album sales going to Winona Laduke's Honor the Earth for Indigenous environmental justice.

Daniel has produced tracks for various members of the hip-hop collective Hieroglyphics and released his 2021 album Book of Spells on the Hieroglyphics Imperium Recordings label. In 2013 he composed the original score and executive produced the Shomari Smith documentary Til Infinity: The Souls of Mischief. The film reflects on the 20-year anniversary of the band Souls of Mischief's debut album 93 'til Infinity and includes over 50 interviews with prominent MCs, DJs, and producers of the era.

In 2021 he released his first full-length album, titled Book of Spells, celebrating the power of nature and the divine feminine featuring an all female line-up of guest musicians. The album includes the single and video "Lover's Prayer" featuring Doris Pearson of the 1980s pop R&B band Five Star and remixes by Stuart Matthewman of Sade, Domino, and Breakbeat Lou. His self-produced remix and video "Dakini" (God's Eye Mix) features Phesto and Tajai of Souls of Mischief, and Sunspot Jonz of Living Legends.

=== The 3 Doors/The 3 Dense Planes & Re:Visions ===
In 2025 Daniel released a new audio project titled Re:Visions (Music From The 3 Doors/The 3 Dense Planes). A collaborative album reinterpreting the instrumental score from The 3 Doors/The 3 Dense Planes, the artists 2023 immersive sound and video installation that explores themes of spirit, nature as medicine and journeys through non-ordinary reality. The installation's evocative soundscapes inspired several musical artists to contribute their voices to re-workings of the original score, giving rise to the collaborative project. The remix album features vocals by ten guest artists and friends including Emily Kokal of Warpaint, Leo Wyndham from the UK band Palace, and Bay Area rapper Del The Funky Homosapien, with original music production and arrangements by Alex Asher Daniel himself.

In July 2025 Daniel created and released six short film teasers to promote the album featuring clips from studio sessions with guest artists Del The Funky Homosapien, Leo Wyndham, Emily Kokal, Pep Love from Hieroglyphics, and Doris Pearson from the band Five Star.

== Discography ==
=== Albums ===
Year	Title	Notes
2021	Book of SpellsReleased: November 2021 Label: Good Medicine, Hieroglyphics Imperium	All songs were produced by Alex Asher Daniel "Incantations & Celebrations of Nature & The Divine Feminine"
2025	The 3 Doors/The 3 Dense Planes Releases: February 2025 Label: Good Medicine	Original score for the 2023 sound/video installation The 3 Doors/The 3 Dense Planes
2025	Re:Visions Released: July 2025 Label: Good Medicine	A multi-stage project, Re:Visions was created in response to Daniel's art installation The 3 Doors/The 3 Dense Planes and features ten guest artists

=== EPs ===
Year	Title	Notes
2019	Anima Mundi Released: November 2019	Instrumental compositions based on the 5 classic elements.

=== Singles ===
Year	Title	Notes
2022	"Talahalusi" (38.2740818°N, -122.3616431°W) Released: September 2022 Label: Good Medicine	Collaboration with Adia Millet's Sound Dome for Di Rosa Center for Contemporary Art.
2022	"Living The Art" Released: July 2022 Label: Good Medicine	Featuring Marzenka
2022	"WarriorLoverHealerChild" (BBL’ed) Released: March 2022 Label: Good Medicine	Remix by Breakbeat Lou Feat. Louie
2022	"Solstice" (Love, Ecstasy, and Terror Mix) Released: January 2022 Label: Good Medicine	Remix by Adam Bravin, She Wants Revenge Feat. Sarah Walk.
2022	"Solstice" (Cottonbelly Dub) Released: January 2022 Label: Good Medicine	Remixed by Stuart Matthewman, Sade Feat. Sarah Walk.
2021	"Solstice" Released: December 2021 Label: Good Medicine	Featuring Sarah Walk From the album Book Of Spells
2021	"Dakini" (Domino's Raise My Soul Remix)" Released: December 2021 Label: Good Medicine	Produced by Domino, Hieroglyphics Feat. Yesh
2021	"Dakini" (God's Eye Mix) Released: December 2021 Label: Good Medicine	Produced by Alex Asher Daniel Feat. Sunspot Jonz, Phesto D, Tajai, Souls Of Mischief
2021	"Dakini" Released: November 2021 Label: Good Medicine	Featuring Yesh From the album Book Of Spells
2021	"Lover’s Prayer" (Clay Mix) Released: October 2021 Label: Good Medicine	Drum N Bass remix produced by Clay Matthewman
2021	"Lover’s Prayer" (Are & Be Mix) Released: October 2021 Label: Good Medicine	Remix produced by Alex Asher Daniel Featuring Doris Pearson
2021	"Lover’s Prayer" Released: September 2021 Label: Good Medicine	Featuring Doris Pearson From the album Book Of Spells
2020	"Chant" Released: December 2020 Label:Good Medicine	Featuring Theresa Wayman Audio installation and video "Psychedelic Ceremony and Spiritual Harmony"
2020	"Ocean Song" Released: July 2020	33:33 minute composition created for World Oceans Day Featuring Sarah Walk & Manjit Devgun
