= My Last Good Deed =

Studio album by A Plus
- Released: May 1, 2007
- Genre: Hip-hop
- Length: 1:03:56
- Label: Hiero Imperium
- Producer: Coley Cole; Compound 7; Jake One; J-Zone; Quincy Tones; Opio

A Plus chronology
My Last Good Deed (2007)	Grow Theory (2018)

Professional ratings
Review scores
Source	Rating
AllMusic	3.5/5 stars
HipHopDX	3.5/5
PopMatters	7/10
RapReviews	6.5/10

My Last Good Deed is the debut solo studio album by Jamaican-American rapper and record producer A Plus. It was released on May 1, 2007, through Hieroglyphics Imperium Recordings. Production was handled by Compound 7, Quincy Tones, Coley Cole, Jake One, J-Zone and Opio. It features guest appearances from Alena Vance, Bless Man, Casual, Del the Funky Homosapien, Femi, J Crow, Jennifer Johns, Pep Love, Sunspot Jonz, Ty Knitty, and the rest of his Souls of Mischief group.

== Track listing ==
No.	Title	Producer(s)	Length
1.	"Intro: Lyrically Beautiful" (featuring J Crow)	Compound 7	1:30
2.	"The One" (featuring Bless Man)	Jake One	4:00
3.	"A-P-L-U-S"	Coley Cole	3:48
4.	"A Beautiful Thing" (featuring Casual)	Compound 7	4:00
5.	"Patna Please"	Compound 7	4:08
6.	"Whats Hannin" (featuring Ty Nitty)	J-Zone	3:54
7.	"My Last Good Deed"	Compound 7	4:15
8.	"My Dub Song"	Compound 7	3:09
9.	"Nothin' Fake/The Ultimate" (featuring Del the Funky Homosapien and Pep Love)	Compound 7	2:48
10.	"Good Time Charlie"	Compound 7	4:17
11.	"Kiss the Sky" (featuring Jennifer Johns)	Quincy Tones	3:59
12.	"Javelin" (featuring JC and Ty Nitty)	Compound 7	4:32
13.	"Far Away" (featuring Sunspot Jonz and Femi)	Quincy Tones	3:56
14.	"Right Quik" (performed by Souls of Mischief)	Compound 7	4:14
15.	"Outro: Unbroken" (featuring Alena Vance)	Compound 7	3:03
16.	"Now There You Go"	Compound 7	4:50
17.	"Hit That Marley"	Opio	3:33
Total length:			1:03:56

Notes

- tracks 16 and 17 are bonus tracks.

== Personnel ==
- Adam "A Plus" Carter – vocals, producer, mixing, executive producer
- James K. "J Crow" Crosby – vocals (track 1)
- Erika Denise Lawrence – background vocals (tracks: 1, 15)
- Femi Andrades – background vocals (tracks: 1, 15), vocals (track 13)
- Robert Earl Newells – background vocals (tracks: 1, 15)
- Julian "Bless Man" Harker – vocals (track 2)
- Jonathan "Casual" Owens – vocals (track 4)
- Ty Nitty – vocals (tracks: 6, 12)
- Teren "Del the Funky Homosapien" Jones – vocals (track 9)
- Pallo "Pep Love" Peacock – vocals (track 9)
- Jennifer Johns – vocals (track 11)
- JC – vocals (track 12)
- Corey "Sunspot Jonz" Johnson – vocals (track 13)
- Tajai Massey – vocals (track 14)
- Opio Lindsey – vocals (track 14), producer (track 17)
- Damani "Phesto" Thompson – vocals (track 14)
- Alena Vance – vocals (track 15)
- Jacob B. "Jake One" Dutton – producer (track 2)
- Coley Cole – producer (track 3)
- Jarrett "J-Zone" Mumford – producer (track 6)
- Matt Kelley – mixing
- Ken Lee – mastering
- Frank William Miller Jr. – design, layout
- Hasain Rasheed – photography
