= Fear Itself (Casual album) =

Studio album by Casual
- Released: February 1, 1994
- Recorded: July 1992 – February 1993
- Studios: Hyde Street (San Francisco, CA)
- Genre: Hip hop
- Length: 49:21
- Label: Jive
- Producers: Casual; Del the Funky Homosapien; Domino; Jay Biz

Casual chronology
Fear Itself (1994)	Meanwhile... (1997)

Singles from Fear Itself
- 1. "That's How It Is" Released: August 6, 1993; 2. "I Didn't Mean To" Released: January 17, 1994; 3. "Me-O-Mi-O" Released: May 2, 1994

Fear Itself is the debut solo studio album by American rapper and record producer Casual. It was released on February 1, 1994, via Jive Records. The recording sessions took place between July 1992 and February 1993 at Hyde Street Studios in San Francisco, California. The album was produced by Casual and fellow Hieroglyphics Crew members Domino, Del the Funky Homosapien, and Jay-Biz. It features guest appearances from Del the Funky Homosapien, Pep Love and Saafir. The album debuted at number 108 on the Billboard 200 and number 22 on the Top R&B Albums chart in the United States.

The album had three singles issued: "That's How It Is", which peaked at No. 22 on the US Hot Rap Singles, "I Didn't Mean To", which peaked at No. 29 on the US Hot Dance Music/Maxi-Singles Sales and No. 34 on the Hot Rap Singles, and "Me-O-Mi-O", which peaked at No. 50 on the Hot Dance Music/Maxi-Singles Sales.

== Critical reception ==
Professional ratings
Review scores
Source	Rating
AllMusic	4/5 stars
Los Angeles Times	3/4 stars
RapReviews	9.5/10
The Source	4/5 stars

Cheo Hodari Coker of Vibe said, "Casual's braggadocious, rip-roaring flow is fortified by upright bass lines, serpentine jazz/funk horns, and thunderous drum kicks". The Los Angeles Times wrote that "Casual's zippy, improvisational style is backed by nifty, jazzed-up funk beats."

AllMusic's Chris Witt commended Casual for his lyrical abilities, noting how the MC "produces an unending and seemingly unstoppable flow of boasts and taunts", and also remarking that "the simplicity of his message belies the complexity of his vicious wordplay". In 2008, it was listed by Vibe as one of the 24 Lost Rap Classics.

== Track listing ==
No.	Title	Writer(s)	Producer(s)	Length
1.	"Intro"	John Owens; Damian Siguenza	Domino	1:42
2.	"You Flunked"	Owens	Casual	3:14
3.	"Me-O-Mi-O"	Owens; Siguenza	Domino	4:06
4.	"Get Off It"	Owens	Casual	3:14
5.	"That's How It Is"	Owens; Teren Jones	Del the Funky Homosapien	2:57
6.	"That Bullshit" (featuring Saafir)	Owens	Casual	1:46
7.	"Follow the Funk"	Owens; Siguenza	Domino	3:55
8.	"Who's It On" (featuring Del the Funky Homosapien and Pep Love)	Owens; Jones; Paulo Peacock; Siguenza	Domino	3:56
9.	"I Didn't Mean To"	Owens	Casual	3:39
10.	"We Got It Like That"	Owens; Siguenza	Domino	3:11
11.	"A Little Something" (featuring Del the Funky Homosapien)	Owens; Jones	Casual	1:21
12.	"This Is How We Rip Shit"	Owens; Jamie Suarez	Jay-Biz	3:36
13.	"Lose in the End"	Owens; Siguenza	Domino	3:45
14.	"Thoughts of the Thoughtful"	Owens; Siguenza	Domino	2:56
15.	"Chained Minds"	Owens	Casual	3:05
16.	"Be Thousand"	Owens; Siguenza	Domino	2:58
Total length:				49:21

Sample credits

- Track 1 contains a sample of "Revenge Is a Virtue" written and performed by Roy Ayers.
- Track 2 contains a sample of "Cold Duck Time" written by Eddie Harris, performed by Les McCann & Eddie Harris.
- Track 3 contains a sample of "Rural Still Life #26" written by Mike Lang, performed by Tom Scott.
- Track 4 contains a sample of "Mr. Clean" written by Weldon Irvine and performed by Freddie Hubbard, and "Fire and Rain" written by James Taylor and performed by Phil Upchurch.
- Track 5 contains a sample of "Top Billing" written by Nat Robinson and Kirk Robinson, performed by Audio Two.
- Track 7 contains a sample of "Hard Times" written and performed by Curtis Mayfield.
- Track 8 contains a sample of "Tragic Magic" written and performed by Dr. Nathan Davis.
- Track 13 contains a sample of "Believe It or Not (Theme Music from 'Kojak')" written by Billy Goldenberg, and "Chicken Heads" written by Bobby Rush and Calvin Carter and performed by Black Heat.
- Track 14 contains a sample of "Brawling Broads" written and performed by Roy Ayers.

== Personnel ==
- John "Casual" Owens – vocals, producer (tracks: 2, 4, 6, 9, 11, 15), mixing, sleeve notes
- Adam "A-Plus" Carter – additional vocals (tracks: 1, 12)
- Reggie "Saafir" Gibson – vocals (track 6)
- Paulo "Pep Love" Peacock – additional vocals (track 6), vocals (track 8)
- Teren "Del the Funky Homosapien" Jones – vocals (tracks: 8, 9, 11), producer (track 5)
- Extra Prolific – additional vocals (tracks: 12, 16)
- Damani "Phesto" Thompson – additional vocals (track 15)
- Tajai Massey – additional vocals (track 16)
- "DJ Touré" Batiste Duncan – scratches (tracks: 2, 4, 5, 12), sleeve notes
- Damian "Domino" Siguenza – producer (tracks: 1, 3, 7, 8, 10, 13, 14, 16), mixing
- Jamie "Jay-Biz" Suarez – producer (track 12)
- Matt Kelley – recording engineering
- Chris Trevett – mixing engineering
- Tom Coyne – mastering
- Jean Kelly – design
- Michael Lucero – photography

== Charts ==
Chart (1994)	Peak position
US Billboard 200	108
US Top R&B Albums (Billboard)	22
