= 93 'til Infinity (song) =

1993 single by Souls of Mischief

Single by Souls of Mischief

from the album 93 'til Infinity
- B-side: "Disseshowedo"
- Released: February 13th, 1993
- Genre: Hip hop
- Length: 4:46
- Label: Jive
- Songwriters: Adam Carter; Damani Thompson; Opio Lindsey; Tajai Massey; William Cobham
- Producer: A-Plus

Souls of Mischief singles chronology
"That's When Ya Lost" (1993)	"93 'til Infinity" (1993)	"Get the Girl, Grab the Money and Run" (1994)

Music video
- "93 'til Infinity" on YouTube

"93 'til Infinity" is a song by American hip-hop group Souls of Mischief. It was released on February 13th, 1993 as the second single from their debut album of the same name. It was their only single to ever chart on the US Billboard Hot 100, reaching number 72. The single has been hailed by critics as an inspiration for the hip-hop genre, and is considered one of the greatest West Coast Hip-Hop songs of all time, reaching number 5 on the Rolling Stone's "100 Greatest West Coast Hip-Hop Songs of All Time" list in 2023, and number 7 on the BBC's "The greatest hip-hop songs of all time" list.

== Background and writing ==
The backing track was composed through usage of samples from Billy Cobham's 1974 "Heather", a song from his album Crosswinds. A-Plus told XXL that he created the song, originally titled "91 'til Infinity", when the group was still in high school. He indicated that the song was originally a "slower, more somber beat" and that it was emotional after writing and rapping to the group members. The name was changed to 93 'til Infinity after Souls of Mischief got a record deal in 1992 but knew the song wouldn't be released until 1993. A-Plus went on to say that he originally gave the beat to Pep Love and then took it back when they began working on their debut studio album.

== Music video ==
The video was directed by Michael Lucero and was filmed in numerous locations, including Yosemite National Park.

== Track listing ==
12", CD, Vinyl

1. "93 'til Infinity" (LP Version) - 4:46
2. "93 'til Infinity" (Remix) - 4:40
3. "93 'til Infinity" (LP Instrumental) - 4:48
4. "93 'til Infinity" (Remix Instrumental) - 4:40
5. "Disseshowedo" - 3:59

== Charts ==
Chart (1993)	Peak position
US Billboard Hot 100	72
US Dance Singles Sales (Billboard)	20
US Hot R&B/Hip-Hop Songs (Billboard)	65
US Hot Rap Songs (Billboard)	11

== Certifications ==
Region	Certification	Certified units/sales
New Zealand (RMNZ)	Platinum	30,000^{‡}
United Kingdom (BPI)	Gold	400,000^{‡}
United States (RIAA)	Platinum	1,000,000^{‡}
^{‡} Sales+streaming figures based on certification alone.
