= Montezuma's Revenge (album) =

Studio album by Souls of Mischief
- Released: December 1, 2009
- Recorded: 2008–2009
- Genre: Alternative hip-hop
- Length: 54:11
- Label: Clear Label
- Producers: Prince Paul; Domino; Opio; A-Plus

Souls of Mischief chronology
Trilogy: Conflict, Climax, Resolution (2000)	Montezuma's Revenge (2009)	There Is Only Now (2014)

Singles from Montezuma's Revenge
- 1. "Tour Stories" Released: January 6, 2009; 2. "Proper Aim" Released: November 26, 2009

Montezuma's Revenge is the fifth studio album by the Oakland hip-hop group Souls of Mischief. It was released on December 1, 2009, by Clear Label Records. After a nine-year period dedicated to touring and working on other projects, both solo and as part of Hieroglyphics, Montezuma's Revenge marked Souls of Mischief's return as a group. Souls of Mischief worked for six weeks with the producer Prince Paul at a remote house, where they could focus on recording the album.

Montezuma's Revenge peaked at number 93 on the Top R&B/Hip-Hop Albums chart. The album received positive reviews from music critics upon its release. Most of them commended Prince Paul's production, but some had mixed feelings about the group's unchanged style, believing that the group should have experimented more with it.

== Background ==
Since the release of their critically acclaimed debut album 93 'til Infinity (1993), Souls of Mischief's albums struggled to achieve mainstream success. After the release of Trilogy: Conflict, Climax, Resolution (2000) the group focused on touring and working on Hieroglyphics' albums, along with their own solo albums. Montezuma's Revenge was the group's first album in nearly a decade.

== Recording ==
Souls of Mischief invited producer Prince Paul, known for his work with Stetsasonic, De La Soul, and Gravediggaz, to work on Montezuma's Revenge. According to the producer, he knew the group since Jive signed them in the early 1990s, and decided to work on Montezuma's Revenge to create an album that should have followed their debut album.

To work on the album the group and Prince Paul moved to a house "in the middle of the wilderness", with no connection to the outside world and with only studio equipment. They spent six weeks there, working on the album. The album was named after Montezuma Road where the house was located. Before starting his work on the album Prince Paul gave the group a deadline: if he was not satisfied with the result after two weeks he would drop the project. The deadline motivated the group. In a 2011 interview with Complex magazine Prince Paul admitted he is still not fully satisfied with the end result, but thinks the album is pretty good.

== Release ==
Montezuma's Revenge was released on December 1, 2009, by Clear Label Records, an imprint operated by the group's member Tajai. The album was supported by two singles: "Tour Stories", released as Tour Stories EP on January 6, 2009, and "Proper Aim", released on November 26, 2009. A music video for "Proper Aim" was released, which showed the artist Steven Lopez creating the album's cover art. Montezuma's Revenge peaked at number 93 on the Top R&B/Hip-Hop Albums chart.

In 2010, the group released a box set version of Montezuma's Revenge, in collaboration with the clothing company Carhartt. The box set was limited to 250 copies, and included the album and a Souls of Mischief T-shirt. The group promoted the box set with a series of live shows.

== Critical reception ==
Professional ratings
Review scores
Source	Rating
AllMusic	3.5/5 stars
Robert Christgau	(1-star Honorable Mention)
HipHopDX	3.5/5 stars
PopMatters	7/10
RapReviews	9/10
Spin	7/10

Montezuma's Revenge was met with generally positive reviews, with most music critics praising Prince Paul's production but highlighting the group's lack of originality. Clayton Purdom of AllMusic called it "the opposite of a comeback – a stay-put, maybe, right back in the halcyon '90s", noting that neither Souls of Mischief nor Prince Paul changed since then, which makes Montezuma's Revenge look like a cash grab. Adam Kennedy of BBC Music commended the album, but also criticized the lack of originality. The reviewer believed that while rappers display their skills on the album, Prince Paul's production often outshines them. HipHopDX's Luke Gibson wrote that Montezuma's Revenge "rightfully stands beside [the group's] first two releases", as Souls of Mischief stay true to their audience and themselves. Andrew Martin, writing for PopMatters, called the album "a slightly bloated, though almost-great record", listing occasional weak rhymes and hooks as its downsides. Steve Juon of RapReviews praised the album, writing that Montezuma's Revenge "has the makings of a brand new classic".

== Track listing ==
No.	Title	Writer(s)	Producer(s)	Length
1.	"Intro" (feat. Del the Funky Homosapien (uncredited))	Adam Carter; Damani Thompson; Opio Lindsey; Paul Huston; Tajai Massey; Teren Jones	Prince Paul	2:07
2.	"Won1"	Carter; Thompson; Lindsey; Huston; Massey	Prince Paul	3:54
3.	"Postal"	Carter; Lindsey; Massey	Opio	4:57
4.	"Tour Stories"	Carter; Thompson; Damian Siguenza; Lindsey; Massey	Domino	4:23
5.	"Skit"		Prince Paul	0:28
6.	"Proper Aim"	Carter; Thompson; Lindsey; Huston; Massey	Prince Paul	3:44
7.	"You Got It"	Carter; Thompson; Lindsey; Massey	A-Plus	3:45
8.	"Hiero HQ" (feat. Del the Funky Homosapien (uncredited))	Carter; Thompson; Siguenza; Lindsey; Massey; Jones	Domino	3:30
9.	"Poets Skit"		Prince Paul	0:25
10.	"Poets"	Carter; Thompson; Lindsey; Huston; Massey	Prince Paul	3:47
11.	"Mr. Freeman Skit"	Carter; Thompson; Lindsey; Huston; Massey	Opio; Prince Paul	1:32
12.	"Fourmation"	Carter; Thompson; Lindsey; Huston; Massey	Prince Paul	2:37
13.	"Dead Man Walkin'"	Carter; Thompson; Siguenza; Lindsey; Massey	Domino	2:55
14.	"For Real Y'All"	Carter; Thompson; Lindsey; Massey	Opio	3:00
15.	"Lickity Split"	Carter; Thompson; Lindsey; Huston; Massey	Prince Paul	3:26
16.	"Home Game"	Carter; Thompson; Lindsey; Huston; Massey	Prince Paul	4:33
17.	"Outro" (feat. Del the Funky Homosapien (uncredited))	Carter; Thompson; Lindsey; Huston; Massey; Jones	Prince Paul	2:11
18.	"Lalala"	Carter; Thompson; Lindsey; Huston; Massey	Prince Paul	2:57
Total length:				54:11

== Personnel ==
Credits are adapted from the album's liner notes.

- Prince Paul – mixing, arrangement
- Opio – mixing, arrangement
- A-Plus – mixing, arrangement
- Domino – mixing, arrangement
- Steven Lopez – artwork
- Justin Herman – layout

== Charts ==
Chart (2009)	Peak position
US Top R&B/Hip-Hop Albums (Billboard)	93
