= Ascension (Pep Love album) =

Studio album by Pep Love
- Released: July 24, 2001
- Genre: Hip hop
- Length: 73:48
- Label: Hiero Imperium
- Producers: Jay-Biz; A-Plus; Evidence; Bicasso; Mako; Toure; Domino; Casual

Pep Love chronology
Ascension (2001)	Ascension Side C (2003)

Singles from Ascension
- 1. "Fight Club" Released: 2001; 2. "T.A.M.I." Released: 2002

Ascension is the first studio album by American hip hop artist Pep Love. It was released by Hiero Imperium on July 24, 2001.

== Critical reception ==
Professional ratings
Review scores
Source	Rating
AllMusic	4/5 stars
The A.V. Club	mixed
Exclaim!	favorable
RapReviews.com	9/10

Nathan Rabin of The A.V. Club commented that "Pep Love is another Hieroglyphics original, even if his ambitious but flawed debut remains as notable for its unfulfilled promise as for its uneven execution." Matt Conway of AllMusic wrote, "While Ascension is a notch below the classic debuts delivered by Love's more established teammates, it is a critical building block, as it generates renewed faith in the Hiero collective." Del F. Cowie of Exclaim! praised his "commanding flow" and "rich vocabulary," stating that "he is nothing short of impressive, balancing an insistent philosophical edge with the urge to hand out verbal beat-downs."

In 2014, Paste placed it at number 6 on the "12 Classic Hip-Hop Albums That Deserve More Attention" list.

== Track listing ==
No.	Title	Producer(s)	Length
1.	"The Grime & Grit"	Jay-Biz	3:21
2.	"Living Is Beautiful"	A-Plus	3:52
3.	"The Grind"	A-Plus	4:11
4.	"The Fight Club"	Evidence	4:18
5.	"U.S." / "U.S. Interlude"	A-Plus; Bicasso	6:42
6.	"The Onus (What You Are)" (featuring Tajai)	A-Plus	6:12
7.	"T.A.M.I."	Mako	4:53
8.	"My Energy"	Toure	4:17
9.	"Ascension"	Mako	4:07
10.	"Act. Phenom"	Domino	4:17
11.	"A New Religion" (featuring The Grouch)	Jay-Biz	3:58
12.	"Pacific Heights"	A-Plus	4:52
13.	"Karma (The Snake Charmer)" (featuring Major Terror)	A-Plus	5:33
14.	"If You Can't Beat 'Em" (featuring Casual)	Casual	3:49
15.	"Different"	Domino	3:55
16.	"Black People (Melanin Magnetic)"	A-Plus	4:20
Total length:			73:48

== Personnel ==
Credits adapted from liner notes.

- Pep Love – vocals, art direction
- Jay-Biz – production (1, 11), turntables (5, 10, 16)
- A-Plus – production (2, 3, 5, 6, 12, 13, 16)
- DJ Lex – turntables (3, 6, 8, 15, 16)
- Casual – background vocals (4), vocals (14), production (14), recording
- DJ Babu – turntables (4)
- Evidence – production (4), recording (4), mixing (4)
- Kurt Matlin – recording (4), mixing (4)
- Goapele – background vocals (5)
- Bicasso – production (5)
- Tajai – vocals (6), additional vocals (8), recording
- Eric McFadden – mandolin (6), guitar (6, 12)
- Mako – production (7, 9)
- Erika – additional vocals (8)
- Toure – production (8), recording
- Domino – production (10, 15)
- The Grouch – vocals (11)
- Major Terror – vocals (13)
- Moses Milliyons – djembe (16)
- Matt Kelley – additional recording, engineering, mixing
- Ken Lee – mastering
- Lady T – art direction
- Gannon Graphics – design
- B+ – photography
