= Me-O-Mi-O =

Single by Casual

from the album Fear Itself
- Released: May 3, 1994
- Genre: Hip hop, West Coast hip hop
- Length: 4:06
- Label: Jive
- Songwriter(s): J. Owens, D. Siguenza, Mike Lang
- Producer(s): Domino

Casual singles chronology
"I Didn't Mean To" (1994)	"Me-O-Mi-O" (1994)

"Me-O-Mi-O" is a song by American hip hop artist Casual. The song was recorded for his debut album Fear Itself (1994) and released as the third and final single from the album in May 1994.

== Track listing ==
12", 33 1/3 RPM, Vinyl

1. "Me-O-Mi-O" (LP Version) - 4:04
2. "Rock On" - 4:42
  (feat. Pep Love)
3. "Rock On" (Instrumental) - 4:42
4. "Me-O-Mi-O" (It's a Me Thang) - 4:02
5. "That's How It Is" (Disseshowedo Remix) - 3:44
6. "Me-O-Mi-O" (It's a Me Thang Instrumental) - 4:02

CD

1. "Me-O-Mi-O" (LP Version, Clean) - 4:05
2. "Me-O-Mi-O" (It's a Me Thang, Clean) - 4:02
3. "Me-O-Mi-O" (LP Instrumental) - 4:04
4. "Me-O-Mi-O" (It's a Me Thang Instrumental) - 4:02

== Personnel ==
Information taken from Discogs.

- mixing – Casual, Domino
- production – Casual, Domino, Jay Biz, Toure
- rapping – Pep Love
- remixing – Jay Biz
- scratching – Toure
- vocals (background) – Tajai

== Chart performance ==
Chart (1994)	Peak position
U.S. Hot Dance Music/Maxi-Singles Sales	50
