= Never No More =

Single by Souls of Mischief

from the album 93 'til Infinity
- A-side: "Make Your Mind Up"
- B-side: "Good Feeling"
- Released: 1994
- Genre: Hip hop
- Length: 3:41
- Label: Jive Records
- Songwriter(s): A. Carter, O. Lindsey, T. Massey, D. Thompson
- Producer(s): A-Plus

Souls of Mischief singles chronology
"That's When Ya Lost" (1993)	"Never No More" (1994)

"Never No More" is a song by American hip hop group Souls of Mischief recorded for their 1993 debut album 93 'til Infinity. The song was the third and final single released in promotion of the album.

== Track listings ==
12"

1. "Never No More" [LP Version]
2. "Never No More" [Instrumental]
3. "Make Your Mind Up" [Rock On Mix]
4. "Never No More" [76 Seville Mix]
5. "Good Feeling"
6. "Never No More" [76 Seville Instrumental]

== Charts ==
Year	Single	Peak chart positions	
Year	Single	U.S. Hot Dance Music/Maxi-Singles Sales	U.S. Hot Rap Singles
1994	"Never No More"	15	46
