= The Familiar Ugly =

American experimental music group

- Origin: Houston, Texas
- Genre: Experimental music
- Years active: 1966–1967
- Label: International Artists
- Past members: Haydn Larson; Roger Hamilton AKA William West; Butch Caraban; Pat Pritchett; Pat Conley; Danny Schwartz; Barbara (Potter) Metyko; Alicia Garza; Linda Linda; Donald Pick; Elaine Banks; Sara Quigles AKA Bird; David Potter's Wife; Joe Pritchett; Dennis Glomm; Ian Glennie; Larry Frost; Skip Gerson; Helena or Helene (Skip Gerson's Girlfriend); Mike Metyko AKA F.R.B Rapho; Jamie Jones; George Farrar AKA Red; Bill Smith; Carolyn Heinman; George Banks AKA George X; Johndavid Bartlett; Frank Simmons; Steve Webb; Mary Sue; Dotty; Candy

The Familiar Ugly was an improvisational music collective formed by the Houston, Texas band the Red Krayola in 1966. The group is most known for being primarily featured on the band's debut album The Parable of Arable Land in 1967, with prominent members stemming from the 1960s Texas psychedelic and local Houston art scene.

== History ==
=== Origins ===
The Familiar Ugly was formed in late 1966 after a Red Crayola performance at the Houston, Texas nightclub known as "Love", which was run by club owner Mark Froman. During the performance, the Red Crayola which consisted of Mayo Thompson on guitar, Steve Cunningham on bass and Frederick Barthelme on drums, performed musical improvisations which they dubbed "free pieces". Froman came on stage to improvise along with the band and was promptly joined by several other audience members. Due to this growing membership, the band decided to make the core group a trio and designate every additional member as part of a secondary group known as "the Familiar Ugly". In March 1967, the Familiar Ugly accompanied the Red Crayola to perform at local Houston radio station KNUZ's Battle of the Bands event at the Gulfgate Mall, where they would be discovered by International Artists producer Lelan Rogers (the brother of Kenny Rogers) who signed the group. Rogers encouraged Red Crayola to record an album with the Familiar Ugly. On their debut album, The Parable of Arable Land, he renamed "free piece" to "Free Form Freak-Out". Thompson stated:

[The Familiar Ugly] was an organization that accompanied, or enveloped, or just happened while we played. It was part of the phenomenon then. They were undirected. Open-numbered; any number above one. If you had the Red Crayola plus one person on stage, that person was the Familiar Ugly. If there were five, or fifty, up to an indefinitely large number. People liked it, liked the 'noise' we made." Free form means this ain't never gonna happen again. We're about to have an experience that will not be [had] ever again. I'm not making any claims about form. It's an oxymoron at best. The guy [Rogers] was looking for an advertising slogan. That was his form; that was his description of what we did. I just clung onto it because I'm a nominalist; So I'm just going with what we're calling it historically.

Drummer Rick Barthelme later reflected, "At heart we were as elitist as could be, but these folks came to our shows and some we knew and most we did not know, but whenever we played, there they were, ready to mount the stage and screech until the last plug was pulled, and there we were, ready to invite them – the Familiar Ugly, we dubbed 'em." The Red Crayola and the Familiar Ugly drew influences from avant-garde music composers John Cage, Harry Partch, Francis Poulenc, David Tudor, Morton Feldman and Karlheinz Stockhausen, along with free jazz albums such as Albert Ayler's Bells and John Coltrane's Ascension.

Freak Out! (1966) by the Mothers of Invention which employed a group of improvisers credited on the sleeve notes as "the Mothers Auxiliary" would be an influence. This group involved musician Kim Fowley who was credited on "hypophone". When later asked about this, Zappa stated, "The hypophone is his mouth, 'cause all that ever comes out of it is hype." Additionally, "Mothers Auxiliary" was an early name for "the Mothers of Invention" suggested by the record label Verve who argued that a band called "The Mothers" would receive no radio play.

Thompson stated, "A lot of people talked about Freakout. Then Zappa came out with his Freak Out! record. But from what I now know about Zappa I'm sure he composed every note. Ours wasn’t an image of chaos, it was chaos."

== Recording ==
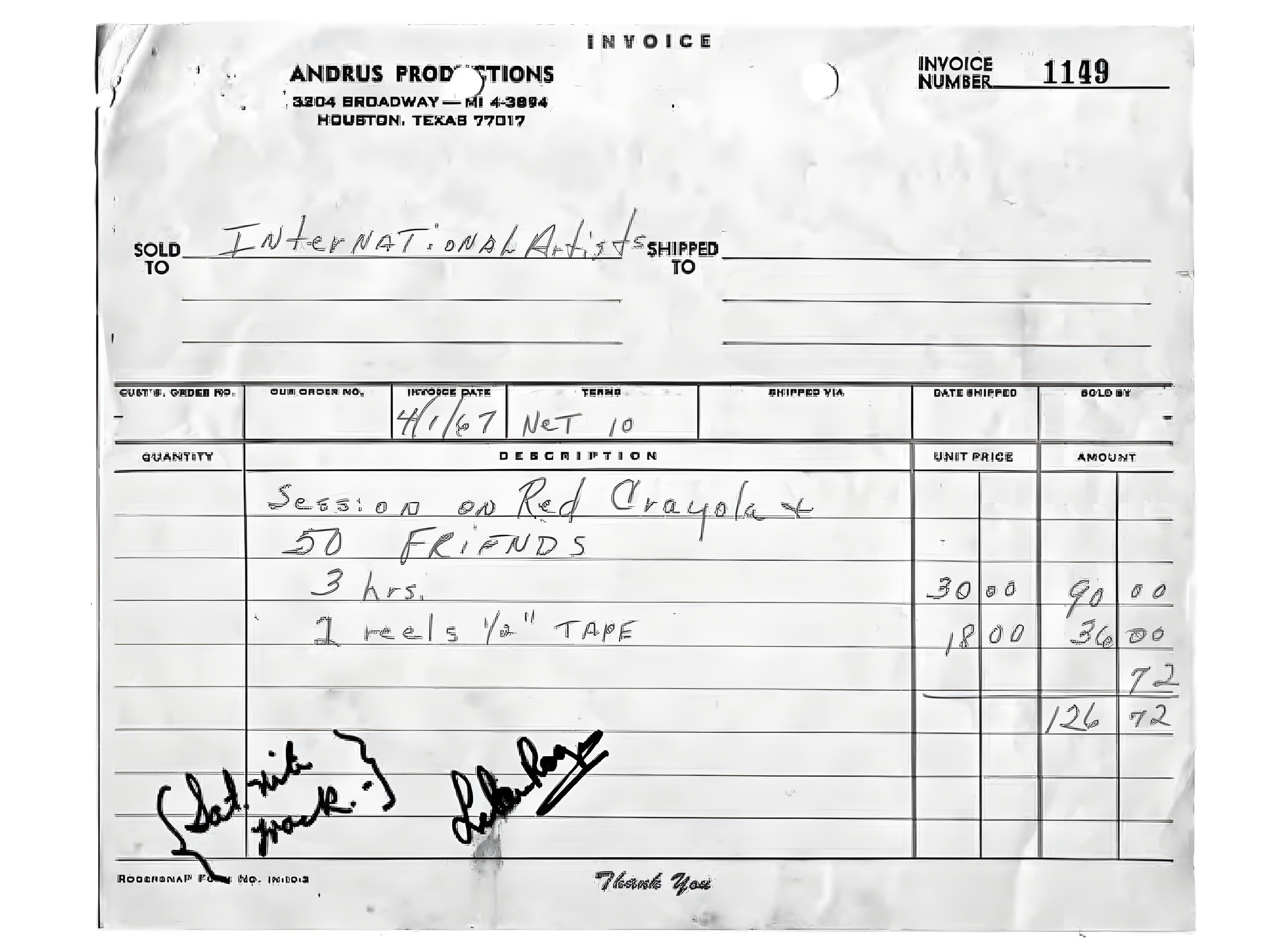
Recording studio invoice from April 1, 1967

On April 1, 1967, the Familiar Ugly were booked for a three-hour recording session at Walt Andrus Studio in Houston, Texas. The recording studio invoice listed the group as "50 friends". The recording would form the basis of the album The Parable of Arable Land which was released in June 1967.

According to writer Ben Graham, the Familiar Ugly "shared joint billing with the Red Crayola on the album sleeve", he described the recording session as the day "over fifty people crammed into Andrus Studio". Writer Colin Larkin described the Familiar Ugly as an "improvisatory unit", whose "erratic contributions punctuated the main body of work".

== Members ==
The Familiar Ugly consisted of several members of the local Houston art scene such as Jamie Jones, Mike Metyko (aka F.R.B. Rapho), Joe Pritchett, Bill Smith and George 'Red' Farrar became "heads" of the group. Additionally, members of the Texas psychedelic scene such as Euphoria bassist Pat Conley and their drummer David Potter's wife, the Lost & Found drummer Steve Webb along with girlfriend Sara Quiggles, and musician Johndavid Bartlett would all be present during the Familiar Ugly recording sessions. Bartlett would later record a studio album with Mayo Thompson entitled "Mother's Milk". Haydn Larson, a member of the Familiar Ugly during the recording sessions would later be cited as performing on spoons.

Familiar Ugly member Skip Gerson would be a collaborator of filmmaker Les Blank and appear at the recording session. Blank would later photograph Red Crayola.

Houston's local art scene would be influential to the Red Crayola and the Familiar Ugly, with Thompson citing figures such as sculptor Jim Love, who had at the time gifted Barthelme a blue fiat, in which the band came up with the name "Red Crayola".

== Legacy ==
After the release of The Parable of Arable Land, the Familiar Ugly disbanded. Thompson remarked, "There came a moment when that was not the point, to become the Grateful Dead or Ken Kesey and The Merry Pranksters and wander around thundering each other on the back about the same stuff over and over. It was about this damned experiment, this project. So we moved away sharply."

Previous members of the Familiar Ugly such as Mary Sue, Dotty, Pat Pritchett, Barbara Metyko, Elaine Banks, Carolyn Heinman and Candy later performed on God Bless the Red Krayola and All Who Sail With It (1968) as part of a chorus of singers.

In 1968, New York band Godz would assemble a group similar to the Familiar Ugly known as "the Multitude" who would improvise on their album The Third Testament. The following year, labelmates Cromagnon invited a cohort of strangers from outside the studio to improvise on their album Orgasm, this group would be known as The Connecticut Tribe. Additionally, German krautrock band Amon Düül were noted for their "fearless free-form improvisations" and would reportedly employ up to a hundred additional members on stage in the early 1970s.

In 1981, Creem magazine wrote a piece on Texas psychedelia which made mention of the Familiar Ugly, stating: "Like the Pied Piper, the band [Red Crayola] attracted a cult, fifty-odd followers who accompanied the Crayola on assorted garbage. When 85 of these freaks crammed into a studio one summer's eve to provide background chaos for a Crayola recording session, the Familiar Ugly was born. The result of this mess can be heard on the perplexing Parable of Arable Land. Rhythms clash as the multitude tries to play drums. Some buffoons slap parts of their anatomy; others stumble into the 15 mikes scattered around the deranged scene. Occasionally a song will rise above the madness only to be smothered by some lamebrain pounding a piano with a banana. Despite its obscure artiness, the Crayola's album signifies what the undercurrent of the psychedelic age: wholesome dementia".

According to AllMusic, half of The Parable of Arable Land was dedicated to the Red Crayola "collaborating with 45 friends, acquaintances, and fellow travelers credited as 'the Familiar Ugly'."

Writer Roni Sarig described the Familiar Ugly as "A sort of Texan version of Ken Kesey's Merry Pranksters". While Reuters described the Familiar Ugly as a "motley troupe of followers that included bikers and college students".

Haydn Larson, a former member of the Familiar Ugly, later became the father of Taraka and Nimai Larson, who formed the band Prince Rama in 2008. Taraka Larson cited finding out about her dad's affiliation to the Familiar Ugly through Peter Kember of Spacemen 3 who offered her a vinyl reissue copy of The Parable of Arable Land after a concert.

== Revival ==
On April 13, 2012, the Whitney Biennial billed a Skype performance by the Red Krayola with the Familiar Ugly.

In 2016, a cancelled Red Krayola concert at New York City's The Kitchen was billed as "a survey of 50 years of their music with the Familiar Ugly".

== Discography ==
- The Parable of Arable Land (1967) by the Red Crayola with the Familiar Ugly

== Bibliography ==
- Sarig, Roni (1998). The Secret History of Rock and Roll: The Most Influential Bands You've Never Heard. Watson-Guptill Publications. ISBN 978-0823076697.
- Graham, Ben (2015). A Gathering of Promises: The Battle for Texas's Psychedelic Music, from The 13th Floor Elevators to The Black Angels and Beyond. Zero Books. ISBN 978-1782790945.
- Larkin, Colin (2011). The Encyclopedia of Popular Music. Omnibus Press. ISBN 978-0857125958.
- Keith, Hamish (2014). Native Wit. Penguin Random House New Zealand. ISBN 978-1775537489.
- Larkin, Colin (1997). The Virgin Encyclopedia of Sixties Music. Virgin. ISBN 978-0753501498.
- Cope, Julian (1995). Krautrocksampler: One Head's Guide to the Great Kosmische Music - 1968 Onwards. Head Heritage. ISBN 978-0952671916.
- Weiss, Jason (2012). Always in Trouble: An Oral History of ESP-Disk', the Most Outrageous Record Label in America (Illustrated ed.). Wesleyan University Press. ISBN 978-0819571595.
