= Orgasm (Cromagnon album) =

Studio album by Cromagnon
- Released: 1969
- Studio: A1 Sound Studio, New York City
- Genre: Avant-garde; sound collage; experimental
- Length: 48:11
- Label: ESP-Disk
- Producer: Austin Grasmere, Brian Elliot

2000 re-release cover

Professional ratings
Review scores
Source	Rating
AllMusic	3/5 stars

Orgasm is the only album by the experimental band Cromagnon, released in 1969 by the ESP-Disk record label. The album was later reissued as Cave Rock in 2010.

== Music and production ==
Orgasm was recorded at A-1 Sound Studio on the Upper West Side of Manhattan in New York City in 1969. Phil Spector's Wall of Sound technique, of which producer Brian Elliot was a fan, heavily influenced the album's sound. During recording, band members brought in random people from the street and asked them to contribute to the album.

On the album's conception, band member Sal Salgado recalled:

The original concept of the album was to progress from different decades of music. Like, in '59 Elvis was shaking his pelvis and driving people — well, women — crazy. And adults as well, making them very upset. And then ten years later Hendrix was pouring lighter fluid on his guitar and getting a lot of great distortion out of his Marshall amps. And The Who was breaking up equipment. And then we were trying to carry it on to the next decade. We were going to say, maybe in 1979 there’ll be a group of people on stage that’ll be blowing through reeds of grass while someone is reciting some poetry, and another person is squirting water at a microphone on stage with a hose…

== Release and legacy ==
Orgasm was originally released in 1969. The album was released onto CD in 1993; it was re-released three more times, in 2000, 2005 and 2009. Music author Jason Weiss wrote that the album "eventually developed a minor cult following and was hailed as a pioneer in sound collage experiments".

Critics have noted how Orgasm foreshadowed the sounds of noise rock, industrial and no wave. Alex Henderson of AllMusic described the track "Caledonia" as sounding "like it could be a Ministry or Revolting Cocks recording from 1989 rather than a psychedelic recording from 1969." Another critic, describing the album, said:

Now, when you stick the needle into the groove that is opener, "Caledonia", you'll immediately think you're listening to Einstürzende Neubauten gone black metal, then you'll realize you're WRONG and that there was no reference points such as that available in 1968.

AllMusic's Alex Henderson writes of the album: "Depending on one's point of view, Cave Rock is either a ridiculously self-indulgent artifact of the '60s counterculture or an underground gem that was way ahead of its time – and it's probably a little bit of both." Jennifer Kelly of Dusted Reviews agrees with Henderson, writing "There’s a palpable fog of self-indulgence hanging over the whole enterprise, a sense of weirdness for weirdness’ sake and lack of discipline or structure. Still, there’s no question that Cromagnon achieved something remarkable in its strange concoction of noise, spoken word, folk, electronics and field recordings."

Pitchfork Media ranked the song "Caledonia" at number 163 on its list of "The 200 Greatest Songs of the 1960s".

In 2007, the Japanese band Ghost covered the track "Caledonia" for their album In Stormy Nights.

== Track listing ==
All tracks are written by Cromagnon.

No.	Title	Length
1.	"Caledonia"	4:21
2.	"Ritual Feast of the Libido"	3:26
3.	"Organic Sundown"	7:10
4.	"Fantasy"	7:19
5.	"Crow of the Black Tree"	9:40
6.	"Genitalia"	2:45
7.	"Toth, Scribe I"	10:38
8.	"First World of Bronze"	2:47
Total length:		48:06

== Personnel ==
The following people contributed to Orgasm:

=== Cromagnon ===
- Austin Grasmere (lead vocals, music)
- Brian Elliot (lead vocals, music)

Connecticut Tribe:

- Peter Bennett (bass guitar)
- Jimmy Bennett (guitar, bagpipes)
- Vinnie Howley (guitar)
- Sal Salgado (percussion)
- Nelle Tresselt (honorary tribe member)
- Mark Payuk (vocals)
- Gary Leslie (vocals, multi-sound effects)
