= Yameen =

American rapper

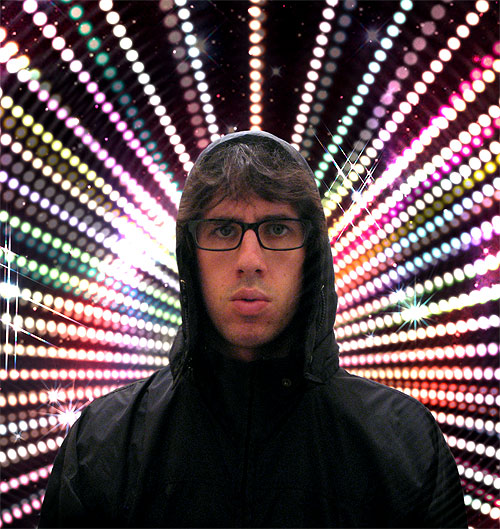
- Yameen aka Stinke

Background information
- Also known as: Yameen; Stinke
- Born: Binyameen Friedberg
- Origin: Philadelphia, Pennsylvania, U.S.
- Genres: Hip-hop, R&B, dance, electronic
- Instruments: Piano, Sampler, Computer
- Years active: 1995–present
- Labels: Clear Label Records, Hieroglyphics Imperium Recordings, Rumble Pack Records, Ropeadope Records, Arrakis Records
- Website: http://www.yameenmusic.com

Yameen is an American hip-hop producer from Philadelphia, Pennsylvania, United States. His most recent album, "Diamond is Unfadable" was released in 2017 on Rumble Pack Records.

== Light of Love / Sound of Fire ==
In 2010, Yameen released an anime music video for his single, “Light of Love” featuring singer, Lady Alma. The video was a production of Daisuke Nakayama's Realthing studio located in Shibuya, Tokyo and directed by Jamie Vickers (Studio 4°C, Madhouse).

“Light of Love” was a vertical slice of an intended full-featured television pilot called “The Sound of Fire,” consisting of characters such as the titular Yameen, Meca, Ichi-go and more featured in the video.

The video ends with the cast of characters sitting atop the iconic Hieroglyphics music group 3-eyed logo, a clear nod to Yameen's history as "StinkE" with the group.

== SupremeEx ==
The recording alias "SupremeEx" is generally reserved for collaborative concept albums between Yameen and Tajai of Souls of Mischief / Hieroglyphics.

In 1998, SupremeEx released the instrumental-only affair, Destructor on retail cassette which originally caught the ear of Tajai and also lead to collaborations with Bobbito's Footworks, Electronic Arts / EA Sports and Eckō Unltd. clothing, among others. SupremeEx & Tajai began recording what would become their first project together, Projecto: 2501 that same year.

In 1999, SupremeEx and Tajai released Projecto: 2501 as the first album on Tajai's fledgling Hieroglyphics Imperium sub-imprint, Clear Label Records. The critically acclaimed EP - applauded for its imaginative use of story telling elements such as included trading cards, Enhanced CD and web-delivered content - featured guest artists Shing02, Low Budget (Hollertronix), Jay Biz (Hieroglyphics), DJ Nozawa & Major Terror. Additional content was also included on the Enhanced CD including a bonus MP3, computer wallpaper, videos in the studio recording "Projecto" and more.

In 2005, Rumble Pack Records released an all-new full-length album from SupremeEx & Tajai entitled, Nuntype. Again, building on the story-telling aspects the duo established on, "Projecto" Nuntype is an album about Chaos, Prophecy and Change with Tajai as a deity who wields the power of Creation. Guest artist included R&B crooner, Goapele on the album's single, "Meaning".

Although he was never formally established as a labelmate and was not closely associated with the classic “Hiero sound,” Yameen’s work as Stinke—the creator and curator of Hieroglyphics.com between 1995 and 2001—contributed to the expansion of the Hieroglyphics discography.

== StinkE (Web Developer) ==
Yameen, under his nom de web "StinkE," designed and coded many popular hiphop websites and was featured as one of URB magazine's "Next 100" people to watch in April 2001. His work with the music group Hieroglpyhics proved particularly ground-breaking.

In 1995 when the individual group members of Hieroglyphics were each released from their respective major record labels, Yameen's fansite caught the attention of Souls of Mischief member Tajai who made the website the official online destination of Hieroglyphics. Hieroglyphics.com was one of the first websites from any music artist and was featured heavily in popular media of the time. Yameen as the site's webmaster engaged directly with the group's fanbase, fostering a vibrant and active online community at a time when most people did not have access to personal computers or the internet. This community-driven aspect is what allowed the Hieroglyphics to continue to flourish as independent artists without the need of a major label.

In 2013, Oakland, California mayor Jean Quan recognized the efforts of Yameen and Hieroglyphics.com as "a pioneering entity in technology and innovation and shining example of a local, homegrown business with worldwide appeal and recognition" while officially establishing September 3 as "Hiero Day" in the city of Oakland, CA.

Yameen also coded websites for artists such as Aesop Rock, The Giant Peach, Murs, Mr. Len & more.

== Discography ==
=== Solo albums ===
- Never Knows Best (2008)
- Never Knows More (2009)
- Never Knows Encore (2010)
- Come On & Go Off (2014)

=== SupremeEx albums ===
- Destructor (1998)
- Projecto: 2501 (2000)
- Nuntype (2005)
- Nuntype: The Instrumentals (2006)

=== Other appearances ===
- March Madness 2000 (Videogame) (1999)
- Some of the Coolest Rappers...Ecko Clothing Compilation (2000)
- Sleeping Giant, mixtape by Tajai (2003)
- Pre-emptive Hype 3.5 HipHopSite
