= Nashville String Machine =

American music collective

Nashville String Machine is a musical collective comprising session musicians, based in Nashville, Tennessee, United States. Members of the group have been credited on records dating from 1972 to the present, although the group was formally established as "The Nashville String Machine" in 1981. The music aggregating website AllMusic lists 1,171 albums on which "The Nashville String Machine" is credited (from 1972 through 2017). The group has appeared in configurations as large as an orchestra or as small as a duo.

The group was formed by violinists Carol Walker Gorodetzky (b. March 23, 1942 in Nashville, Tennessee, died 2023) and her husband concertmaster Carl J. Gorodetzky (b. March 6, 1937 in Philadelphia, Pennsylvania, married to Carol Gorodetzky January 26, 1980). They oversee the contracting of arrangers, players and studio support as needed; their available supply of potential orchestra members maximizes at 80.

Since the required number of orchestra members changes from project to project, individual members vary. However, there are three members of the ensemble who date from its 1981 founding:

- Pam Sixfin – violin
- Gary Vanosdale – viola
- Craig Nelson – arco bass.

Carol Walker Gorodetzky, founding member and violinist for the group, died on November 16, 2023.
