= Projecto: 2501 =

EP by SupremeEx and Tajai
- Released: November 2000 (Vinyl); April 2001 (CD)
- Genre: Hip-hop
- Labels: Clear Label Records, Hieroglyphics Imperium Recordings
- Producer: SupremeEx

SupremeEx and Tajai chronology
Projecto: 2501 (2000)	Nuntype (2005)

Professional ratings
Review scores
Source	Rating
URB Magazine	link
Vice Magazine	link

Projecto: 2501 is a joint concept EP by Souls of Mischief and Hieroglyphics MC Tajai and SupremeEx. The album draws upon ideas from Serial Experiments Lain and Ghost in the Shell, as well as the artists' own ideas about technology and its influence on life (see their cover story feature & interview in the December 2000 issue of XLR8R magazine). It was released on vinyl in November 2000, and later as an enhanced CD in April 2001.

The EP was recorded and arranged remotely over the Internet, with Tajai and SupremeEx exchanging files and communicating with each other from their respective coasts.

Several other artists such as Shing02, DJ Low Budget (Hollertronix), Jay Biz (ex Hieroglyphics), DJ Nozawa and Major Terror are featured.

Two random trading cards (out of a total set of 4) are included with every CD and vinyl record. Additional enhanced, hidden content on the CD includes a bonus MP3, computer wallpapers and videos in the studio recording Projecto: 2501.

The duo would team-up once again in 2005 to release their first full-length album together, Nuntype.

== Track listing ==
1. Authentic Intelligence
2. Origin of Fable
3. Contact (featuring Shing02, Major Terror and DJ Nozawa)
4. Digidestruction (featuring DJ Low Budget)
5. Conceptualize (featuring Jay Biz)
6. Fluid Motion
