= Nuntype =

Studio album by SupremeEx and Tajai
- Released: November 8, 2005
- Genre: Hip-hop
- Label: Rumble Pack Records
- Producer: SupremeEx

SupremeEx and Tajai chronology
Projecto: 2501 (2000)	Nuntype (2005)

Professional ratings
Review scores
Source	Rating
IGN	5.5/10 stars

Nuntype is the first full-length album by Souls of Mischief/Hieroglyphics MC Tajai and SupremeEx following their EP, Projecto: 2501. The album features R&B and soul singer Goapele. It was released on November 8, 2005 on Rumble Pack Records.

Much like their previous work together, Nuntype is a conceptualized album crafting original music, visual artwork, story telling lyrics and a multimedia extension (in this case, the Nuntype website) to help create a world for the listeners to indulge in.

== Story ==
Tajai is a deity who wields the power of Creation. Swirling within the doldrums of his ponderous age, the deity has become bored and seeks to satiate his loneliness by mindlessly toying with the fates of his human "playthings." But after many millennia of evolution, the humans have become advanced lifeforms, and they have progressed so mightily in their civilized, organically-technologized culture. As a Prophecy is foretold by the stars and comes to pass, Chaos ensues, threatening the very grip the deity needs to maintain control of a universe that has outgrown him.

== History ==
The pre-production of Nuntype began almost immediately after the completion and publication of Projecto in 1999. On his website, SupremeEx mentioned after completing the sci-fi-heavy Projecto, the duo wanted to go in the polar opposite direction, instead focusing on magic, chaos and prophecy to convey their next chapter.

The name "Nuntype" was originally coined as "Nu_type"; a name Tajai and SupremeEx tentatively referred to their new album to amongst themselves ("New type"). However, in researching the history of prophecies, SupremeEx came across the name of the Egyptian god of Chaos, Nun. Ironically, the hieroglyph for Nun closely resembles the iconic insignia of the Hieroglyphics hiphop band whom Tajai is a member of. The coincidence was enough for Tajai and SupremeEx to officially coin their album's title, "Nuntype" in reference to the Egyptian god.

== Instrumental album ==
An instrumental version of the album with extended versions and unreleased tracks was exclusively released online in November 2006. Initially seeded by SupremeEx himself as a "test" over BitTorrent networks, the album was then officially released on music download services such as iTunes, Napster and eMusic.

== Track listing ==
1. Prelude
2. The Jagged Edged Genesis
3. Millions of Fishies
4. Formless
5. NUN
6. Cleanup March
7. Baboo Birth
8. Hemingway
9. Meaning (Featuring Goapele)
10. Cacophony Carknock
11. Babadoo
12. Are We Happy (Hidden song)
13. Where U From (Hidden song)
