= Second Time Around =

Second Time Around or The Second Time Around may refer to:

== Film ==
- The Second Time Around (1961 film), an American Western comedy starring Debbie Reynolds
- Second Time Around (film), a 2002 Hong Kong film
- The Second Time Around (2016 film), a Canadian romance film

== Television ==
- Second Time Around (TV series), a 2004–2005 American sitcom
- "Second Time Around" (Cheers), a 1986 episode
- "Second Time Around" (Inspector Morse), a 1991 episode
- "Second Time Around" (Roseanne), a 1991 episode
- "Second Time Around" (The Royal), a 2003 episode
- "The Second Time Around" (Flipper), a 1964 episode
- "The Second Time Around" (Minder), a 1984 episode
- "The Second Time Around" (Only Fools and Horses), a 1981 episode
- "Second Time Around", the first episode of the 2021 Rugrats reboot

== Music ==
=== Albums ===
- Second Time Around (Ghost album), 1992
- The Second Time Around (album), a 1961 album by Etta James
- 2nd Time Around (album), by the Spinners, 1970
- Second Time Around, by the Kinks, 1980
- Second Time Around, by Mike Tramp, 2020

=== Songs ===
- "The Second Time Around" (1960 song), written by Sammy Cahn and Jimmy Van Heusen
- "The Second Time Around" (Shalamar song), 1979
- "Second Time Around", by the Damned from Machine Gun Etiquette, 1979
- "Second Time Around", by the Electric Light Orchestra from Discovery, 2001 reissue
- "Second Time Around", by the Mighty Lemon Drops from Laughter, 1989
- "Second Time Around", by the Posies from Every Kind of Light, 2005
- "Second Time Around", by Yo-Yo Ma, Mark O'Connor, and Edgar Meyer from Appalachian Journey, 2000
- "Second Time Around", the theme song of the sitcom Step by Step, 1991
