= No Man's Land (Souls of Mischief album) =

Studio album by Souls of Mischief
- Released: 1995
- Recorded: 1994–1995
- Genre: Hip-hop
- Length: 58:18
- Label: Jive
- Producers: A-Plus; Casual; Del the Funky Homosapien; DJ Touré; Jay Biz; Opio; Snupe; Tajai

Souls of Mischief chronology
| 93 'til Infinity (1993) | No Man's Land (1995) | Focus (1998) |

Singles from No Man's Land
- 1. "Rock It Like That" Released: 1995

Professional ratings
Review scores
| Source | Rating |
|---|---|
| AllMusic | 3/5 stars |
| Muzik | 3.5/5 stars |
| RapReviews | 6.5/10 |
| The Source | 3.5/5 stars |

No Man's Land is the second album by the American hip-hop group Souls of Mischief, released in 1995. It was their final release under Jive Records. The album was produced by fellow Hieroglyphics members A-Plus, DJ Touré, Opio, Tajai, Jay-Biz, Casual, Del the Funky Homosapien, and Snupe. It features guest appearances from Pep Love and Del the Funky Homosapien. The album debuted at number 111 on the Billboard 200 and number 27 on the Top R&B/Hip-Hop Albums charts in the United States.

"Rock It Like That" was released as a single, and peaked at number 44 on the US Billboard Hot Rap Songs chart.

== Track listing ==
| No. | Title | Producer(s) | Length |
|---|---|---|---|
| 1. | "So You Wanna Be A..." | Opio | 1:15 |
| 2. | "No Man's Land" | DJ Toure | 4:38 |
| 3. | "Rock It Like That" | Opio | 4:10 |
| 4. | "Secret Service" | A-Plus | 3:11 |
| 5. | "FreshDopeDope" | Jay Biz | 3:55 |
| 6. | "Where the Fuck You At?" | DJ Toure; Casual | 4:14 |
| 7. | "'94 Via Satellite" (featuring Del the Funky Homosapien) | Del the Funky Homosapien | 4:57 |
| 8. | "Do You Want It?" | A-Plus; DJ Toure; Tajai | 4:08 |
| 9. | "Come Anew" | A-Plus | 1:02 |
| 10. | "Bumpshit" | Jay Biz | 4:32 |
| 11. | "Ya Don't Stop" | A-Plus | 4:30 |
| 12. | "Yeah It Was You" (featuring Pep Love) | A-Plus; Tajai | 1:55 |
| 13. | "Hotel, Motel" | Opio | 1:44 |
| 14. | "Fa Sho fa Real" | DJ Toure | 4:55 |
| 15. | "Dirty D's Theme (Hoe or Die)" | Snupe | 4:47 |
| 16. | "Times Ain't Fair" | A-Plus; Tajai | 4:25 |
| Total length: | | | 58:18 |

== Charts ==
| Chart (1995) | Peak position |
|---|---|
| US Billboard 200 | 111 |
| US Top R&B/Hip-Hop Albums (Billboard) | 27 |
