= I Didn't Mean To =

Single by Casual

from the album Fear Itself
- Released: January 17, 1994
- Recorded: Hyde Street Studios
- Genre: Hip hop, West Coast hip hop
- Length: 3:39
- Label: Jive
- Songwriter(s): Casual
- Producer(s): Casual

Casual singles chronology
| "That's How It Is" (1993) | "I Didn't Mean To" (1994) | "Me-O-Mi-O" (1994) |

"I Didn't Mean To" is a song by American hip hop artist Casual. The song was recorded for his debut album Fear Itself (1994) and released as the second single for the album in January 1994.

== Track listing ==
12", 33 1/3 RPM, Vinyl

1. "I Didn't Mean To" (LP Version) - 3:39
2. "I Didn't Mean To" (Instrumental) - 3:39
3. "I Didn't Mean To" (Remix) - 3:23
4. "I Didn't Mean To" (Remix Instrumental) - 3:23
5. "That's How It Is - Part II" - 3:29
  (feat. A-Plus)

== Personnel ==
Information taken from Discogs.

- engineering – Matt Kelley
- mix engineering – Chris Trevett
- mixing – Casual, Domino
- production – Casual, Toure
- remixing – Casual, Mike G

== Chart performance ==
| Chart (1994) | Peak position |
|---|---|
| U.S. Hot Dance Music/Maxi-Singles Sales | 29 |
| U.S. Hot Rap Singles | 34 |
