= Tune In, Turn On, Free Tibet =

Studio album by Ghost
- Released: April 20, 1999
- Recorded: 1998
- Genre: Neo-psychedelia; Experimental rock
- Length: 60:07
- Label: Drag City

Ghost chronology
Snuffbox Immanence (1999)	Tune In, Turn On, Free Tibet (1999)	Hypnotic Underworld (2004)

Professional ratings
Review scores
Source	Rating
AllMusic	4/5 stars
Orlando Weekly	
Pitchfork Media	(5.7)

Tune In, Turn On, Free Tibet is an album by the band Ghost. It was released by Drag City originally in 1999. It was released as a companion album with Snuffbox Immanence.

The album has one cover of a Pearls Before Swine song.

== Track listing ==
1. "We Insist" (Ghost) – 2:33
2. "Comin' Home" (Ghost) – 4:11
3. "Way to Shelkar" (Ghost) – 5:16
4. "Images of April" (Pearls Before Swine, Tom Rapp) – 3:09
5. "Lhasalhasa" (Ghost) – 3:28
6. "Remember" (Ghost) – 2:55
7. "Change the World" (Ghost) – 4:41
8. "Tune in, Turn on, Free Tibet" (Ghost) – 33:54
