= Collected Works 95–96 =

Collected Works 95-96

Compilation album by Masaki Batoh
- Released: 2004
- Recorded: 1995, 1996
- Genre: Neo-psychedelia, indie rock
- Label: Drag City

Collected Works 95–96 is a collection of recordings by Masaki Batoh from the albums A Ghost From The Darkened Sea (1995) and Kikaokubeshi (1996).

The collection features covers of "Yoo Doo Right" by Can and the Cream song "World of Pain" (written by Gail Collins Pappalardi And Felix Pappalardi).

== Track listing ==
1. "You Doo Right" (Can)
2. "World of Pain"(Collins/Pappalardi)
3. "Sham No Umi"
4. "Spooky"
5. "Ebb"
6. "Benthos"
7. "Kikaokubeshi"
8. "Magakami"
9. "Death Star"
10. "Tuchigumo"
11. "A Ghost from the Darkened Sea"
