= In Stormy Nights =

2007 studio album by Ghost

Studio album by Ghost
- Released: January 23, 2007
- Recorded: 2004–2006
- Genre: Neo-psychedelia; Experimental rock
- Length: 62:27
- Label: Drag City

Ghost chronology
Hypnotic Underworld (2005)	In Stormy Nights (2007)	Overture: Live in Nippon Yusen Soko 2006 (2007)

In Stormy Nights is the final studio album by the Japanese band Ghost. It was released by Drag City on January 23, 2007.

== Track listing ==
The CD and LP releases of the album have slightly different track listings. These are as follows:

=== CD track listing ===
No.	Title	Length
1.	"Motherly Bluster"	5:19
2.	"Hemicyclic Anthelion"	28:05
3.	"Water Door Yellow Gate"	5:56
4.	"Gareki No Toshi"	7:50
5.	"Caledonia (Cromagnon cover) "	5:34
6.	"Grisaille"	9:43

=== LP track listing ===
Side one

1. "Hemicyclic Anthelion"

Side two

1. "Water Door Yellow Gate"
2. "Gareki No Toshi"

Side three

1. "Caledonia"
2. "Motherly Bluster"
3. "Grisaille"

Side four

1. "Caledonia (Sing Together Mix)" (bonus track, 45 rpm)

== Personnel ==
The following people contributed to In Stormy Nights:

Musicians

- Masaki Batoh – vocals, acoustic guitar, Springer
- Michio Kurihara – electric guitar
- Taishi Takizawa – saxophone, flute, vibraphone, etc.
- Kazuo Ogino – piano, analogue synthesizer, kaval, gaita, tenor recorder
- Takuyuki Moriya – contrabass
- Junzo Tateiwa – frame drums, cymbals, timpani, tabla, etc.

Technical

- Taishi Takizawa – producer
- Satoru Fujii – recording, mixing, mastering
- Michiru Tawa – assistant engineer

== Reception ==
Professional ratings
Review scores
Source	Rating
Allmusic	link
Pitchfork Media	8.0/10 link
Slant Magazine	link
Stylus Magazine	B+ link

In Stormy Nights has received mostly positive reviews from critics. The album currently has a 76 out of 100 rating on the review aggregate site Metacritic, which indicates "generally favorable reviews".

Reviewer Matthew Murphy of Pitchfork Media gave the album an 8.0/10, writing "And though In Stormy Nights... can hardly be said to be a perfect work, one has to admire and celebrate Ghost's determination never to step in the same river twice." In another positive review, Allmusic's Thom Jurek called the album "A work of absolute beauty, chaos, seductive darkness and cosmic light." Andrew Gaerig of Stylus Magazine gave the album a B+, writing that In Stormy Nights "is easily their most unhinged, aggressive record; they make a show of steamrolling their subtler instincts."

Not all reviews were positive, though. Both Dusted Reviews' Matthew Wuethrich and Almost Cool's Aaron Coleman criticized the track "Hemicyclic Anthelion". Wuethrich called the track "bloated and forced", while Coleman wrote that the track "just completely derails what would otherwise be a fairly solid and concise album." In another negative review, Slant Magazine's Jimmy Newlin criticized In Stormy Nights for its lack of warmth, writing "Maybe pastiche is inevitable, even in the Japanese avant garde scene, but can't it at least be a little more fun?"
