= Snuffbox Immanence =

Studio album by Ghost
- Released: April 20, 1999
- Recorded: 1998
- Genre: Baroque pop
- Label: Drag City

Ghost chronology
Lama Rabi Rabi (1996)	Snuffbox Immanence (1999)	Tune In, Turn On, Free Tibet (1999)

Professional ratings
Review scores
Source	Rating
Allmusic	link
City Pages	not rated link
Pitchfork Media	8.7/10 link

Snuffbox Immanence is an album by the Japanese band Ghost. It was released by Drag City in 1999. The band also released Tune In, Turn On, Free Tibet on the same day.

The album features a cover version of "Live With Me", originally by The Rolling Stones.

== Track listing ==
All songs written by Masaki Batoh unless otherwise indicated.

1. "Regenesis"
2. "Live with Me" (Jagger, Richards)
3. "Soma"
4. "Daggma"
5. "Snuffbox Immanence"
6. "Obiit 1961"
7. "Tempera Tune"
8. "Fukeiga"
9. "Sad Shakers"
10. "Hanmiyau"
