= Overture: Live in Nippon Yusen Soko 2006 =

Live album by Ghost
- Released: October 23, 2007
- Recorded: October 9, 2006
- Genre: Psychedelic; Free improvisation Avant-garde
- Length: 56:03
- Label: Drag City

Ghost chronology
In Stormy Nights (2007)	Overture: Live in Nippon Yusen Soko 2006 (2007)

Overture: Live in Nippon Yusen Soko 2006 is a live improvisation album by Japanese band Ghost. It was recorded in a former warehouse space. The audience was not permitted to leave the venue until the performance was complete. The band members were hidden from each other and only able to hear each other. The music was improvised from start to finish. The album came with a bonus DVD of the performance.

== Track listing ==
1. Overture (56:03)
