= Temple Stone =

Live album by Ghost
- Released: 1994
- Recorded: 1992–1993
- Genre: Neo-psychedelia; Experimental
- Length: 56:58
- Label: Drag City
- Producer: Ghost

Ghost chronology
Second Time Around (1992)	Temple Stone (1994)	Lama Rabi Rabi (1996)

Professional ratings
Review scores
Source	Rating
Allmusic	4/5 stars
Pitchfork	7.9/10

Temple Stone is a live album by the Japanese band Ghost. It was originally released in 1994 then reissued by Drag City in 1997.

The album features a performance of the traditional folk song "Blood Red River".

== Track listing ==
1. "Moungod Radiant Youth" – 4:47
2. "Guru in the Echo" – 4:24
3. "Under the Sun" – 6:18
4. "Moungod Asleep" – 5:57
5. "Freedom" (A.K.A. People Get Freedom) – 6:29
6. "Rakshu" – 6:31
7. "Blood Red River" – 6:00
8. "Orange Sunshine" – 4:23
9. "Giver's Chant" – 3:13
10. "Sun is Tangging" – 8:56

== Personnel ==
- Masaki Batoh – 12-string guitar, hurdy-gurdy, vocals
- Kazuo Ogino – piano, organ, recorder, Tibetan horn, harp
- Junichi Yamamoto – bass, bamboo flute, percussion, harmony
- Taishi Takizawa – cello, flute, saxophone, percussion, harmony
- Daisuke Naganuma – viola on 1, drums on 1, 6 and 7
- Taku Sugimoto – cello on 1, 6, 7 and 9
- Iwao Yamazaki – drums on 3
- Kohji Nishino – bass on 3
- Michio Kurihara – electric guitar on 9
- Setsuko Furuya – percussion on 9

== Recording locations ==
- Seiryu Temple – tracks 1, 2, 3, 6, 7 and 9
- Waseda Salvation Church – 4, 5, 8 and 10
