= Hypnotic Underworld =

Album by Ghost

Studio album by Ghost
- Released: January 27, 2004
- Recorded: July 2003
- Genre: Neo-psychedelia, experimental, avant-rock
- Length: 69:14
- Label: Drag City
- Producer: Taishi Takizawa

Ghost chronology
Turn In, Turn On, Free Tibet (1999)	Hypnotic Underworld (2004)	In Stormy Nights (2007)

Hypnotic Underworld is an album by the band Ghost, released on January 27, 2004, on Drag City. The album is the first album to feature cellist/bassist Takuyuki Moriya and percussionist Junzo Tatewia, who replaced Hiromichi Sakamoto and Setsuko Furuya respectively.

The album has two cover songs: one of Earth and Fire's "Hazy Paradise" and one of Syd Barrett's "Dominoes".

== Track listing ==
All tracks are written by Ghost, unless otherwise noted

No.	Title	Writer(s)	Length
1.	"Hypnotic Underworld": 1. "God Took a Picture of His Illness on This Ground" (13:31); 2. "Escaped and Lost Down in Medina" (7:09); 3. "Aramaic Barbarous Dawn" (2:54); 4. "Leave the World!" (0:22)"		23:56
5.	"Hazy Paradise"	Chris Koerts	4:52
6.	"Kiseichukan Nite"		5:03
7.	"Piper"		6:41
8.	"Ganagmanag"		10:04
9.	"Feed"		7:06
10.	"Holy High"		6:09
11.	"Dominoes/Celebration for the Gray Days"	Ghost, Syd Barrett	6:43

== Personnel ==
The following people contributed to Hypnotic Underworld:

=== Ghost ===
- Masaki Batoh – acoustic guitar, vocals, 12-string acoustic guitar
- Michio Kurihara – electric guitar
- Taishi Takizawa – bouzouki, flute, saxophone, theremin, tin whistle
- Kazuo Ogino – organ, piano, lute, Mellotron, Korg synthesizer, Celtic harp
- Takuyuki Moriya – electric bass, double bass, cello
- Junzo Tatewia – percussion, drums

=== Additional personnel ===
- Masaki Hayashi - Engineer
- Ichiyusai Kuniyoshi - Artwork
- Kazuo Ogino - Photography
- Dan Osborn - Cover layout
- Keiko Yoshida - Photography

== Reception ==
Professional ratings
Review scores
Source	Rating
AllMusic	4.5/5 stars
Pitchfork	(8.7/10)
Shaking Through	(3.8/5)
Stylus Magazine	(B)

Hypnotic Underworld has received mostly positive reviews. On the review aggregate site Metacritic, the album has a score of 78 out of 100, indicating "generally favorable reviews".

AllMusic's Sean Westergaard gave the album a very positive review, writing "Hypnotic Underworld is a new high-water mark from one of rock's most interesting bands. Highly recommended." Brandon Stosuy from Pitchfork also praised the album, writing "Much more could be said, but it's more important to state plainly, in barest terms, that Ghost have emerged as one of the most formidable (and important) rock bands I know. And Hypnotic Underworld is their rollicking masterwork." Shaking Through called the album "another worthy addition to the group's idiosyncratic catalog." Stylus Magazine's Dave Segal, while criticizing the album for meandering too long and Masaki Batoh's vocals, concluded his review with "Still, I'd rather hear Ghost's overreaching ambition and exploratory excess than the stunted machinations of most current indie rock."
