= Lama Rabi Rabi =

Studio album by Ghost
- Released: December 10, 1996
- Recorded: 1996
- Genre: Neo-psychedelia; Experimental rock Psychedelic folk
- Length: 59:25
- Label: Drag City
- Producer: Taishi Takizawa

Ghost chronology
Temple Stone (1994)	Lama Rabi Rabi (1996)	Snuffbox Immanence (1999)

Lama Rabi Rabi is an album by the band Ghost. Drag City released the album in 1996, the first time a Ghost album had been issued by an American label.

== Critical reception ==
Professional ratings
Review scores
Source	Rating
AllMusic	4/5 stars
Spin	8/10

The Austin Chronicle wrote: "Highlights include the acid-psych mantra 'Rabirabi' and the fleeting, phantasmal folk of 'Into the Alley', eclipsed only by 11-minute crescendo 'Agate Scape'." Spin noted that "you can hear psychedelia, vocals fed through a megaphone, a folk tune interrupted by studio phasing, even hints of a power ballad." The Staten Island Advance determined that "whirling, chant-driven, progressive-rockers lead way to a beautifully rolling folk-rock, recalling an amalgamation of Quicksilver Messenger Service, Incredible String Band, Flying Saucer Attacks and Pink Floyd."

AllMusic wrote that "the lengthy, fascinating 'Mastillah' starts Lama on a striking high, with a series of percussive instruments meshed with acoustic drones and low, wordless mantras, leading to a steady rhythm pace."

== Track listing ==
1. "Masttillah" - 8:03
2. "RabiRabi" - 7:32
3. "Into the Alley" - 4:37
4. "Marrakech" - 5:18
5. "Who Found a Lost Rose in the Warship?" - 3:11
6. "Mex Square Blue" - 4:14
7. "My Hump is a Shell" - 1:44
8. "Bad Bone" - 4:17
9. "Abyssinia" - 3:36
10. "Agate Scape" - 10:49
11. "Summer's Ashen Fable" - 6:04

== Personnel ==
- Taishi Takizawa
- Junichi Yamamoto
- Iwao Yamazaki
- Kazuo Ogino
- Michio Kurihara
- Masaki Batoh
