= Phesto =

American rapper (born 1974)

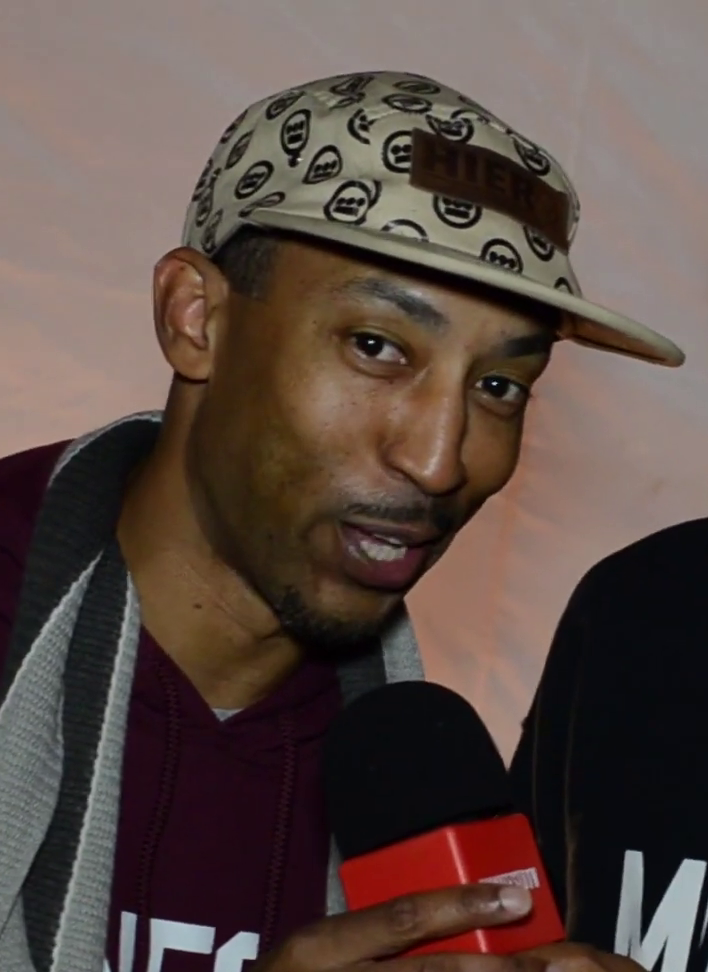
- Phesto in 2013

Background information
- Also known as: Phesto; Phesto Dee
- Born: Damani Thompson; April 29, 1974 (age 52)
- Origin: Oakland, California, U.S.
- Genres: Hip hop
- Instrument: Microphone
- Years active: 1991–Infinity
- Labels: Hieroglyphics Imperium Recordings; Jive Records
- Website: http://www.hieroglyphics.com

Damani Thompson (born April 29, 1974), known professionally as Phesto and Phesto Dee, is an American rapper and producer. He is one of the founding four members of the Oakland, California-based underground hip hop group Souls of Mischief, and, with the Souls of Mischief, a part of the eight-person, alternative hip hop collective, the Hieroglyphics.

== Biography ==
Born and raised in Oakland, California, Phesto D met fellow Souls of Mischief member Tajai, as well as Hieroglyphics' founder, Del tha Funkee Homosapien, in junior high school. Tajai introduced Phesto to members A-Plus and Opio, and the group formed in high school before releasing their debut album, 93 'til Infinity on Jive Records in 1993.

As a rapper, Phesto is "renown[ed] for his crazy, and up-tempo flows. Rhyming about anything from 'quantum cryptography' to secret Jedi mind tricks, Phesto's skills are undoubtedly a vital piece of the Hieroglyphics foundation".

Phesto has contributed to all four Souls of Mischief albums, as well as the two Hieroglyphic studio albums. He has also produced or performed on solo projects of various Hieroglyphics' members.

== Discography ==
=== Solo ===
- Granite Pedigree - EP (2011)
- Background Check (2012)
- Infrared Rum (2014)

=== With Souls of Mischief ===
- 93 'til Infinity (1993)
- No Man's Land (1995)
- Focus (1997)
- Trilogy: Conflict, Climax, Resolution (2000)
- Montezuma's Revenge (2009)
- There Is Only Now (2015)

=== With Hieroglyphics ===
- 3rd Eye Vision (1998)
- Full Circle (2003)
- The Kitchen (2013)
