= Ghost (Ghost album) =

Studio album by Ghost
- Released: 1990
- Recorded: 1990
- Genre: Neo-psychedelia; Experimental rock
- Length: 44:15
- Label: Drag City

Ghost chronology
Ghost (1990)	Second Time Around (1992)

Professional ratings
Review scores
Source	Rating
Allmusic	4/5 stars
Pitchfork	8.0/10

Ghost is the debut album by the Japanese band Ghost. It was originally released in 1990 and reissued by Drag City in 1997. The song Sun is Tangging also appeared on the compilation Tokyo Flashback Vol. 2 (1992).

== Track listing ==
1. "Sun is Tangging" - 5:19
2. "Guru in the Echo" - 4:27
3. "Moungod Te Deum" - 4:11
4. "I've Been Flying" - 4:19
5. "Ballad of Summer Rounder" - 10:43
6. "Moungod Asleep" - 5:45
7. "Moungod Radiant Youth" - 3:02
8. "Rakshu" - 6:22

== Personnel ==
- Masaki Batoh (vocals, acoustic guitars, banjo)
- Taishi Takizawa (Acoustic guitars, flute, saxophone)
- Kohji Nishino (Bass guitar)
- Mu Krsna (percussion, vocals)

=== Additional musicians ===
- Noriaki Hagiya (Oboe on 1, 8)
- Daisuke Naganuma (Violin on 3)
- Kazuo Ogino (Recorder on 3,7)
- 'Chiriko' and 'Noriko' ('Water' on 3)
- Michio Kurihara (Electric guitar on 4)
- Naohiro Yoshimoto (Bass guitar on 2)
- 'Tenma' (percussion on 2)
- Shigeru Konno (percussion on 2,5)
- 'Utsuo' and 'Akane' ('Wind' on 8)
