= There Is Only Now =

Studio album by Souls of Mischief
- Released: August 26, 2014
- Recorded: 2013–2014
- Genre: Hip-hop
- Length: 40:07
- Labels: Linear Labs, Essential Music
- Producer: Adrian Younge

Souls of Mischief chronology
| Montezuma's Revenge (2009) | There Is Only Now (2014) |

There Is Only Now is the sixth studio album by American hip-hop group Souls of Mischief. The album was released on August 26, 2014, by Linear Labs. The album features guest appearances from Busta Rhymes, William Hart, Snoop Dogg and Scarub.

== Background ==
In a July 2013, interview on Hip-Hop Nation, the album's producer Adrian Younge announced the album, saying: "The next project is Adrian Younge Presents Souls of Mischief. That’s my next big thing and I’m super happy about that. It’s a project that if somebody misses the sounds of 93 'til Infinity meets The Low End Theory meets De La Soul Is Dead. If somebody misses that kind of sound, they’ll be happy to hear this album because it goes back to that time, you know. Kind of like how the Ghostface album [12 Reasons To Die] kind of went back to that time. And I love both styles of music back then, so I’m very, very excited."

He continued: "And it’s also a concept album too — Souls of Mischief almost gets killed by some dude that was just crazy and the whole album just starts off with this incident, and then it blossoms into these different stories that are a result of this volatile incident. And that’s basically what that album is about. It’s dope though. It’s really dope. As far as stylistically, it’s kind of like if Bob James and Herbie Hancock recorded with Q-Tip back in the day, you know what I’m saying. That’s the perspective on the album. I was with Ali Shaheed Muhammad yesterday showing him some of the stuff and he was totally getting it because he’s going to be the narrator on this album, like how RZA was sort of the narrator for Ghost [on 12 Reasons], that’s what Shaheed’s going to be doing. It’s Native Tongues shit, you know what I’m saying, so that’s what I’m super psyched about. I mean it’s done now; I’m just touching stuff up. But it’s pretty much done. It’s going to be released in September."

In an August 2014 interview with PopMatters, he spoke about how he produced the album, saying: "You’re doing it over the course of an album, so you have to understand what the different moods are throughout the album and once you understand those points of progress within the story are you compositionally illustrate music that denotes that feeling. So there’s one part where everybody’s panicking—that song’s actually called "Panic Struck"—so I wanted to make something that feels kind of jarring and pervasive, in your face, temperamental. Then there's a song about love so I want something that feels like love, there's a song where there's a finale closing out the whole story, the whole plot line. So I want to make it seem like a chase scene to the end. So it all depends on what's going on because I'm a film composer first, so I like to approach my music cinematically."

He spoke about if there were songs on the album that were difficult to produce, saying: "Yes, there was a lot of difficulty because I always try to outdo myself. So I set very high standards because I kind of want to be an exemplary example of who I should be as an artist. I always compare myself to what I did last, so I’ve got to try and beat what I did last I’m always upping my own bar. It’s one of those things that creates a lot of difficulty just for myself, but it’s the kind of difficulty I need to embrace because it makes me a better artist. And I do not want to be one of those artists that falls off later, I want to be one of those artists that is continually pushing the bar. But going back to certain songs on the album that were more difficult than others, I would say. There’s a song called "Miriam Got a Mickey" that was pretty difficult, there's a song called "Ghetto Superhero" that wasn't that easy. I mean there's a lot of... it all ranges. A lot of it is just, you know everything I do is samples. It's tape, analog, hardware, hand crafted music and soul. It's not just creating a loop; every single thing has to be done by hand. A lot of it is just tedious."

== Critical reception ==
Professional ratings
Review scores
| Source | Rating |
|---|---|
| Exclaim! | 8/10 |
| HipHopDX | 4/5 stars |
| XXL | 4/5 (XL) |

There Is Only Now received positive reviews from music critics. Homer Johnsen of HipHopDX said, "Philosophically, the message on There Is Only Now is an intelligent one, as is the case with most things Hiero. Part of the experience is hearing the story as it unfolds, but at the same time, the Souls of Mischief are dealing with concepts like the Theory of Relativity, and experiencing life while being fully present. Like the album itself, the cast of guest appearances is minimal, yet praiseworthy for its originality. Busta Rhymes and Scarub (Living Legends) portray Womack and Stoney, two characters in the story, while Snoop Dogg supplies some wisdom of his own on the title-track. The seamless listen from beginning to end, and the intricacy of the story itself make it almost possible to listen to There Is Only Now just once." Kevin Jones of Exclaim! stated, "Fresh, crisp drums, creamy keys, luxuriant strings and timely flute and horn flourishes, each held together by a series of mood-defining bass lines, work to soundtrack this production, an inspiring foil that the record's MCs make certain not to waste on this grand testament to Souls' skill and staying power." Sheldon Pearce of XXL said, "With There Is Only Now, Souls of Mischief turn out a prize just short of a solid masterpiece. It tremors along steadily, churning out consistently good but not great mini narratives, and it does so with flair but with little change of pace. Still, it is the realization of an ambitious idea seen through to its conclusion, and it is an exceptional attempt to push rap to its limits as a medium."

== Track listing ==
- All tracks produced by Adrian Younge.

| No. | Title | Length |
|---|---|---|
| 1. | "K-NOW Intro" (featuring Ali Shaheed Muhammad) | 0:20 |
| 2. | "Time Stopped" | 2:20 |
| 3. | "Womack's Lament" (featuring Busta Rhymes) | 1:52 |
| 4. | "Panic Struck" | 3:11 |
| 5. | "K-NOW Interlude #1" (featuring Ali Shaheed Muhammad) | 0:37 |
| 6. | "Another Part of You" (featuring William Hart) | 3:20 |
| 7. | "All You Got Is Your Word" | 3:36 |
| 8. | "There Is Only Now" (featuring Snoop Dogg) | 3:30 |
| 9. | "Meeting of the MInds" | 2:55 |
| 10. | "K-NOW Interlude #2" (featuring Ali Shaheed Muhammad) | 0:55 |
| 11. | "Miriam Got a Mickey" | 2:10 |
| 12. | "Stone Cold" (featuring Scarub) | 1:24 |
| 13. | "The Synopsis" | 2:09 |
| 14. | "Ghetto Superhero" | 2:44 |
| 15. | "K-NOW Reprise" (featuring Ali Shaheed Muhammad) | 0:22 |
| 16. | "Narrow Escape" | 3:07 |
| 17. | "Finally Back" | 2:37 |
| 18. | "The Last Act" | 2:22 |
| 19. | "K-NOW Outro" (featuring Ali Shaheed Muhammad) | 0:36 |
