= That's How It Is =

Single by Casual

from the album Fear Itself
- Released: August 6, 1993
- Genre: Hip hop, West Coast hip hop
- Length: 2:57
- Label: Jive
- Producer(s): Del tha Funkee Homosapien

Casual singles chronology
"That's How It Is" (1993)	"I Didn't Mean To" (1994)

"That's How It Is" is a song by American hip hop artist Casual. The song was recorded for his debut album Fear Itself (1994) and released as the debut single from the album in August 1993.

== Track listing ==
12", Vinyl

1. "That's How It Is" (LP Version) - 3:07
2. "That's How It Is" (Disseshowedo Mix) - 3:40
3. "That's How It Is" (Acapella) - 2:40
4. "Thoughts of the Thoughtful" (LP Version) - 2:56
5. "That's How It Is" (LP Instrumental) - 3:07

== Personnel ==
Information taken from Discogs.

- production – Del tha Funkee Homosapien, Domino
- remixing – Casual

== Chart performance ==
Chart (1993)	Peak position
U.S. Hot Rap Singles	22
