= Cromagnon (band) =

American experimental band

Background information
- Origin: 1969, New York City
- Genres: Experimental rock
- Labels: ESP-Disk, Rotorelief
- Past members: Austin Grasmere; Brian Elliot; Sal Salgado; Vince Howley

Cromagnon was an American experimental music band that was active during the late 1960s. Led by multi-instrumentalist singer-songwriters Austin Grasmere and Brian Elliot, the band's only release was the album Orgasm in 1969 on ESP-Disk. They have been described as foreshadowing the sounds of noise rock, no wave, industrial and industrial rock.

While the band was not commercially successful, Pitchfork later ranked their song "Caledonia", at number 163 on their list of "The 200 Greatest Songs of the 1960s". The song was later covered by the Japanese experimental band Ghost.

== Discography ==
- Orgasm (1969), later reissued as Cave Rock (2000)
