= Second Time Around (Ghost album) =

Studio album by Ghost
- Released: 1992
- Recorded: 1992
- Genre: Neo-psychedelia; experimental rock
- Length: 48:00
- Label: Drag City

Ghost chronology
Ghost (1990)	Second Time Around (1992)	Temple Stone (1994)

Professional ratings
Review scores
Source	Rating
AllMusic	4/5 stars
Pitchfork	8.3/10

Second Time Around is the second album by the Japanese band Ghost. It was originally released in 1992 and reissued by Drag City in 1997.

== Track listing ==
1. "People Get Freedom" – 1:45
2. "Second Time Around" – 5:37
3. "Forthcoming From the Inside" – 6:11
4. "Higher Order" – 3:30
5. "Awake in a Muddle" – 5:12
6. "A Day of the Stoned Sky in the Union Zoo" – 5:09
7. "First Drop of the Sea" – 5:15
8. "Under the Sun" – 3:25
9. "Orange Sunshine" – 7:39
10. "Mind Hill" – 4:16

== Personnel ==
- Masaki Batoh – vocals, Acoustic and Electric Guitar
- Kazuo Ogino – Recorders, Celtic Harp, Lute, Piano
- Kohji Nishino – Bass, 'Oral Holler' and 'Spiritual Shout'
- Iwao Yamazaki – drums and 'Mantra Tangging'
- Taishi Takizawa – 12-String Guitar, Mandolin, Bouzouki, Cello, Flute, Vibes, Piano and 'Holly Talking'

All members play 'Thousand Gongs', Bell Tree, Tibetan Bells, Duff, Bel Bel Drums, Kamabara and 'Some Nameless Bells and Stones'

- Daisuke Naganuma – Voice and 'Sympathy'
- Masanori Shioya – Oboe and 'Smile'
- Tomo Kuwahala – Tabor Bebe and Tobor Dodo
