= Focus (Souls of Mischief album) =

Studio album by Souls of Mischief
- Released: 1999
- Recorded: 1997–1998
- Genre: Alternative hip-hop
- Label: Hieroglyphics Imperium

Souls of Mischief chronology
No Man's Land (1995)	Focus (1999)	Trilogy: Conflict, Climax, Resolution (2000)

Professional ratings
Review scores
Source	Rating
AllMusic	2/5 stars
The Encyclopedia of Popular Music	3/5 stars
The New Rolling Stone Album Guide	3.5/5 stars

Focus is the third studio album from Souls of Mischief. It was their first release on the independent Hieroglyphics Imperium Recordings label, and was released in 1999. For over a decade, it was a cassette and LP release, only available through the group's website; it has since been made available on digital music sites.

== Critical reception ==
The New Rolling Stone Album Guide wrote that "sung melodies are still virtually absent, but the rapped hooks sound fresh enough to make Focus a welcome return to form."

== Track listing ==
1. "Pay Dues" (Tajai)
2. "Shooting Stars" (Opio)
3. "Way 2 Cold" (Phesto)
4. "Groove 2 Nite" (Opio & Tajai)
5. "Make Way" (A-Plus)
6. "We Intersect" (A-Plus & Tajai)
7. "A to the P" (A-Plus)
8. "Bird's Eye View" (Opio)
9. "Stealth Bombing (Shift the Sands)" (Phesto)
10. "Step Off" (A-Plus)
11. "Holler!" (Tajai)
12. "Big Shit" (Opio & Tajai featuring Casual)
13. "Maximize 3rd Eyes" (Phesto & Tajai)
