= Ghost (Japanese band) =

Japanese experimental rock group

- Origin: Tokyo, Japan
- Genres: Experimental rock; psychedelic rock; folk rock; acid rock
- Years active: 1984–2014
- Labels: P.S.F. Records; Drag City
- Members: Masaki Batoh; Kazuo Ogino; Michio Kurihara; Junzo Tateiwa; Takuyuki Moriya; Taishi Takizawa

Ghost was an experimental rock group formed in Tokyo, Japan, in 1984.

== History ==
Core-member Masaki Batoh grew up in Kyoto, Japan where he attended a private school. During this time, he became interested in American and British rock music ranging from Bob Dylan and Pink Floyd to the Velvet Underground and Japanese rock bands such as the Taj Mahal Travellers and the Flower Travellin' Band.

Later, Batoh formed Ghost with a large and often varying lineup. According to reports posted on Allmusic, the group lived a nomadic existence, drifting from ruins of ancient temples to disused subway stations around the Tokyo area.

The band began releasing their work with the albums Ghost and Second Time Around, which were released, respectively, in 1990 and 1992. The American independent label Drag City licensed each of the albums for distribution, and the Los Angeles The Now Sound label picked up two of Batoh's solo albums, released together as well under the title Collected Works. Two albums, Tune In, Turn On, Free Tibet and Snuffbox Immanence, were released simultaneously in 1999.

As well as their own work, Ghost have recorded and performed with the ex-Galaxie 500 duo Damon and Naomi. Five years after releasing both Snuffbox Immanence and Tune In, Turn On, Free Tibet, Ghost returned with Hypnotic Underworld, and there were some changes in the band. Cellist Hiromichi Sakamoto and percussionist Setsuko Furuya left and were replaced by a rhythm section of Takuyuki Moriya (electric bass guitar, double bass, and cello) and Junzo Tateiwa (drums, tabla, and percussion).

In 2005, the Drag City label released a CD+DVD set titled, "Metamorphosis: Ghost Chronicles 1984-2004". The DVD is a career-spanning collection of footage featuring over two hours of improvisations, one-time-only band lineups, trances, freakouts, live shows and more. The CD features tracks from the previously undocumented 1980s era of studio improvs, live tracks, and outtakes from their debut album.

In January 2007, Ghost released a new album titled In Stormy Nights. It was given a 8.0 rating by Pitchfork.

The year 2008 saw Batoh collaborating live and in the studio with cellist Helena Espvall, resulting in the album Helena Espvall & Masaki Batoh. Overloaded Ark followed a year later.

In 2014, Masaki Batoh announced on Facebook that the group had disbanded after 30 years of activity.

== Members ==
- Masaki Batoh (馬頭將噐): vocals, acoustic guitar
- Kazuo Ogino (荻野和夫): piano, electronics
- Michio Kurihara (栗原道夫): electric guitar
- Junzo Tateiwa (立岩潤三): drums, percussion
- Takuyuki Moriya (守屋拓之): bass
- Taishi Takizawa (瀧澤大志, also known as Giant): theremin, flute, saxophone

== Discography ==
=== Albums ===
- Ghost (1990)
- Second Time Around (1992)
- Temple Stone (1994)
- Lama Rabi Rabi (1996)
- Snuffbox Immanence (1999)
- Tune In, Turn On, Free Tibet (1999)
- Hypnotic Underworld (2004)
- Metamorphosis: Ghost Chronicles 1984–-2004 (CD/DVD set 2005)
- In Stormy Nights (2007)
- Overture: Live in Nippon Yusen Soko 2006 (2007)

=== Singles ===
- Moungod Air Cave b/w Guru in the Echo (1995) Both tracks recorded live in 1989 and 1994 respectively.
- Holy High b/w Filament (2003)

=== Collaborations ===
- Damon and Naomi with Ghost (2000)

=== Compilation appearances ===
- Tama Yura on Tokyo Flashback Vol. 1 (1991)
- Sun is Tangging on Tokyo Flashback Vol. 2 (1992)
- Suspect Tells of Dog Under the Sun on Tokyo Flashback Vol. 3 (1993)
- Way to Coimbula on ALMS: A benefit for Ptolemaic Terrascope (1997)

=== Masaki Batoh solo ===
- A Ghost from the Darkened Sea (1995) Total Album Length: 23min & 39sec
- Kikaokubeshi (1996) Total Album Length: 31min & 42sec
- Collected Works 95-96 (2004) Above two albums on one CD.
- Brain Pulse Music (2012)

=== Helena Espvall / Masaki Batoh collaborations ===
- Helena Espvall & Masaki Batoh (2008)
- Overloaded Ark (2009)
