= Trilogy: Conflict, Climax, Resolution =

Studio album by Souls of Mischief
- Released: October 24, 2000
- Recorded: 2000
- Genre: Alternative hip-hop
- Length: 63:33
- Label: Hieroglyphics Imperium Recordings

Souls of Mischief chronology
Focus (1998)	Trilogy: Conflict, Climax, Resolution (2000)	Montezuma's Revenge (2009)

Professional ratings
Review scores
Source	Rating
AllMusic	3/5 stars
Chicago Sun-Times	3.5/4 stars

Trilogy: Conflict, Climax, Resolution is the fourth studio album by the alternative hip-hop group Souls of Mischief. The album was released via Hieroglyphics Imperium Recordings on October 24, 2000.

== Critical reception ==
The A.V. Club wrote: "Consistent, irreverent, and imbued with an undercurrent of maturity and thoughtfulness, Trilogy proves that ... Souls of Mischief has found a way to thrive in major-label exile." (The New) Rolling Stone Album Guide wrote that Souls of Mischief "remain four great freestyle battlers without the musical gifts to craft great songs."

== Track listing ==
1. "Intro"
2. "Trilogy" (Produced by Tommy Tee)
3. "Interrogation" (Produced by Domino)
4. "Last Night" (Produced by Jay-biz)
5. "Save the Babies (Conflict)"
6. "Bad Business" (Keyboards - Amp Fiddler)
7. "Danglin'" (Produced by Tommy Tee)
8. "Mama Knows Best"
9. "Medication"
10. "That Ain't Life (Climax)'
11. "4th Floor Freaks"
12. "Acupuncture"
13. "Fucked..."
14. "Soundscience" (Produced/Mixed By DJ Babu, Evidence)
15. "Supdoder (What's the Re?)"
16. "Airborne Ranger" (Produced by Phesto)
17. "Phoenix Rising (Resolution)"
18. "Enemy Mind"

== Samples ==
- "Intro"
  - "Scortch 3000 Years Later" by Andrew Belling
- "Interrogation"
  - "Magnum Force" by Lalo Schifrin
- "Medication"
  - "Mating Drive" by Lenny White
- "Airborne Rangers"
  - "You" by A Taste of Honey
