= Tajai =

American rapper

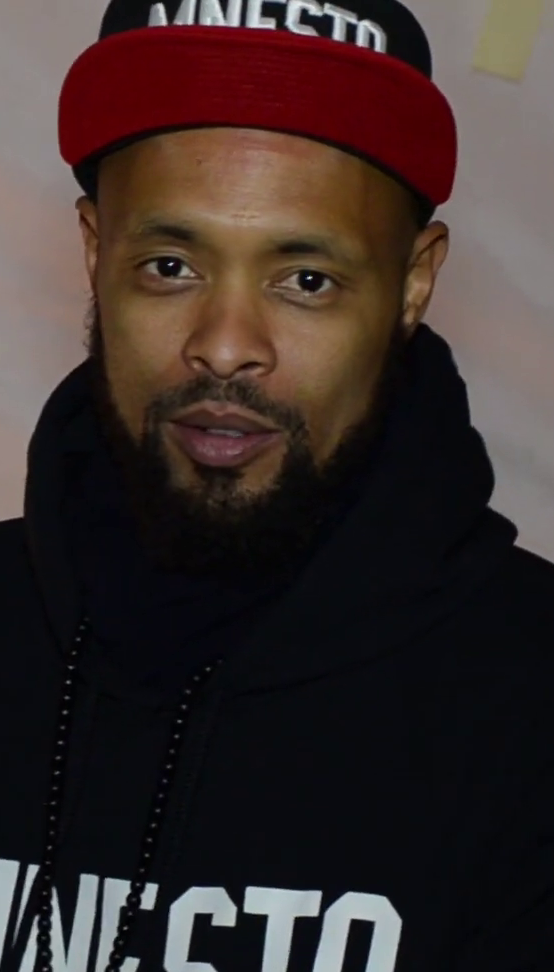
- Tajai in 2013

Background information
- Also known as: Tajai
- Born: Tajai Massey; April 21, 1975 (age 51)
- Origin: East Oakland, U.S.
- Genres: Alternative hip-hop, West Coast hip-hop
- Years active: 1991–present
- Labels: Clear Label Records, Hieroglyphics Imperium Recordings, Jive/BMG Records

Tajai Massey (/tɑːˈʒeɪ/ tah-ZHAY; born April 21, 1975), known mononymously as Tajai, is an American rapper and producer. He is one of the four founding members of the Oakland, California-based underground hip-hop group Souls of Mischief and, with Souls of Mischief, a part of the eight-person, alternative hip-hop collective Hieroglyphics. He is also one half of the hip-hop duo Rap Noir.

== Biography ==
Born in Stanford, California, Massey moved with his family to Oakland, California when he was 2 years old. With a professor for his mother and sysop for a father, he was in a well-educated household where he started computer programming at an early age. He and fellow Souls of Mischief member A-Plus experimented with the Commodore 32, Commodore 64, Apple IIe, and Apple II, among others.

He graduated from Stanford University in 1997 with a BA degree in anthropology.

Massey graduated with an MA in architecture from the UC Berkeley College of Environmental Design in 2014 and became an architectural designer for Sabi Design•Build starting in October 2014. In May 2017, he was part of a group that acquired the Hibiscus Garden Hotel in Lagartero/Santa Catalina, Panama.

Massey is a father of two. He speaks English, Spanish, and Swahili.

== Musical career ==
=== Souls of Mischief ===
In elementary school, Tajai met fellow Souls of Mischief member A-Plus, and the duo began their nascent rap careers. Tajai eventually introduced A-Plus to future Souls of Mischief members Phesto and Opio, and the group formed in high school before releasing their debut album, 93 'til Infinity on Jive Records in 1993.

=== Hieroglyphics ===
Tajai has contributed to all six Souls of Mischief albums, as well as the three Hieroglyphics studio albums. He has also produced or performed on solo projects of various Hieroglyphics' members.

=== SupremeEx ===
In 1999, Tajai and the Hieroglyphics' then-webmaster StinkE, formed the conceptual group SupremeEx, which released an enhanced CD, Projecto: 2501, and in 2005, released the album Nuntype.

=== Crudo ===
Tajai is also a member of Crudo, a new project featuring Mike Patton and Dan the Automator, who made their live debut in 2008.

=== Rap Noir/Trap Noir ===
Tajai is also a member of Rap Noir, a hip-hop duo with producer Unjust from Chosen Few. In mid 2017 they released their first single "Let it Rain." They released their debut album "Rap Noir" in 2018. Tajai also collaborated with producer Harris the Know-it-all to release a remix album called "Trap Noir."

== Discography ==
=== Albums ===
==== Solo ====
- Power Movement (2005)
- Power Movement Remixes (2005)

==== With Souls of Mischief ====
- 93 'til Infinity (1993)
- No Man's Land (1995)
- Focus (1997)
- Trilogy: Conflict, Climax, Resolution (2000)
- Montezuma's Revenge (2009)
- There Is Only Now (2014)

==== With Hieroglyphics ====
- 3rd Eye Vision (1998)
- Full Circle (2003)
- The Kitchen (2013)

==== With SupremeEx ====
- Projecto: 2501 (2000)
- Nuntype (2000)

==== As Rap Noir ====
- Rap Noir {w/ Unjust} (10-31-2018)
- Trap Noir {w/ Harris the Knowitall} (10-31-2018)

==== Collaborations ====
- Hood Famous with Quamallah as Supastars (2007)
- Machine Language with Sleeprockers (2012)

=== Mixtapes ===
- Sleeping Giant (2003)
