= 93 'til Infinity =

Studio album by Souls of Mischief
- Released: September 28, 1993
- Recorded: 1992–1993
- Studio: Hyde Street (San Francisco)
- Genre: Alternative hip-hop
- Length: 54:38
- Label: Jive
- Producers: Domino; Del the Funky Homosapien; A Plus; Casual; Jay Biz

Souls of Mischief chronology
| 93 'til Infinity (1993) | No Man's Land (1995) |

Singles from 93 'til Infinity
- 1. "93 'til Infinity" Released: 1993; 2. "That's When Ya Lost" Released: May 10, 1993; 3. "Never No More" Released: 1994

93 'til Infinity is the debut studio album by American hip-hop group Souls of Mischief. It was released on September 28, 1993, by Jive Records.

== Composition ==
The sound of 93 'til Infinity is characteristic of the distinct style explored by the collective, including a rhyme scheme based on internal rhyme and beats centered around a live bass and obscure jazz and funk samples. According to AllMusic author Steve Huey, "Although the title cut is an underappreciated classic, 93 'til Infinity makes its greatest impression through its stunning consistency, not individual highlights."

== Critical reception ==
Professional ratings
Review scores
| Source | Rating |
|---|---|
| AllMusic | 5/5 stars |
| Christgau's Consumer Guide | A− |
| RapReviews | 9.5/10 |
| The Rolling Stone Album Guide | 4/5 stars |
| The Source | 3.5/5 stars |

93 'til Infinity was critically acclaimed for its subject matter, production, and rapping, though it was not as popular as other West Coast hip-hop albums at the time of its release. The St. Petersburg Times noted that "the new school diversity and relaxed swagger is highlighted by the Souls' raw and effortless verbal flow." The Washington Post praised "the distant trumpet shouts and fuzzy drum brushes in 'Never No More' and the combination of record-scratches and Ramsey Lewis keyboard samples on 'Make Your Mind Up'." Suzann Vogel of Philadelphia Weekly wrote:

At the pinnacle of the G-funked gangsta era, Souls of Mischief took the low road of emotional complexity. Hailing from Oakland, Calif., the foursome's distinctive lyrical mapping, infectious beats and subtle melodies on their debut rerouted gun-toting wannabes back to the underground and vaulted record-label Hieroglyphics to indie legend. MCs Tajai, Opio, Phesto and A-Plus exhibited a surprising charisma between them while undoing ghetto esteem. Their world of boredom, girls, weed, books, lounging and, of course, violence was a more easily understood reality for those caught between Pete Rock's tragedy, De La Soul's hippie aesthetics and Tupac's marginalizing glamour. Follow-up releases by Souls fell pathetically flat of achieving 'Til Infinity's harmony, and MCs have since broached personal topics of greater depth. Still, the genre-altering release possesses one undeniable truth: Reality's never sounded so good.

Steve Huey of AllMusic also positively reviewed 93 'til Infinity, calling it "the best single album to come out of Oakland's Hieroglyphics camp," as well as saying how Souls of Mischief "completely redefined the art of lyrical technique for the West Coast" and that it's "one of the most slept-on records of the '90s".

In 1998, the album was selected as one of The Source's 100 Best Rap Albums.

== Commercial performance ==
93 'til Infinity met commercial success with its title track and lead single, which reached No. 72 on the Billboard Hot 100. It also featured singles "That's When Ya Lost" and "Never No More" which reached the Hot Rap Singles but never charted on the Billboard Hot 100.

== Legacy and influence ==
Over the years, the title track "93 'til Infinity" has been referenced and sampled by numerous artists, including Consequence and Kanye West in their 2004 song "03 'Til Infinity", J. Cole in 2009's "Til' Infinity", Freddie Gibbs in 2009's "How We Do", Big K.R.I.T in 2010's "Somedayz", and Joey Badass in 2013's "95 Til Infinity".

== Track listing ==
| No. | Title | Producer(s) | Length |
|---|---|---|---|
| 1. | "Let 'em Know" | Domino | 4:15 |
| 2. | "Live and Let Live" | Domino | 5:20 |
| 3. | "That's When Ya Lost" (featuring Pep Love) | Del the Funky Homosapien | 3:35 |
| 4. | "A Name I Call Myself" | Del the Funky Homosapien | 4:11 |
| 5. | "Disseshowedo" | Domino, Jay Biz | 2:59 |
| 6. | "What a Way to Go Out" | Domino | 3:59 |
| 7. | "Never No More" | A-Plus | 3:41 |
| 8. | "93 'til Infinity" | A-Plus | 4:46 |
| 9. | "Limitations" (featuring Casual and Del the Funky Homosapien) | Jay Biz | 3:21 |
| 10. | "Anything Can Happen" | A-Plus | 3:02 |
| 11. | "Make Your Mind Up" | Del the Funky Homosapien | 3:51 |
| 12. | "Batting Practice" | Casual | 4:04 |
| 13. | "Tell Me Who Profits" | Casual | 4:02 |
| 14. | "Outro" | Domino | 2:04 |
| Total length: | | | 53:10 |

== Personnel ==
Souls of Mischief

- Opio – vocals
- Tajai – vocals
- Phesto – vocals
- A-Plus – vocals, DJ, producer

Additional personnel

- Pep Love
- Del the Funky Homosapien – producer
- Casual – rap, vocals
- Bill Ortiz – trumpet
- Domino – producer
- Jay Biz – producer
- Kwam
- Snupe – backing vocals

== Charts ==
=== Weekly charts ===
| Year | Album | Peak position | |
| Year | Album | Billboard 200 | Top R&B/Hip Hop Albums |
|---|---|---|---|
| 1993 | 93 'til Infinity | 85 | 17 |

=== Singles ===
| Year | Song | Peak position | | | |
| Year | Song | Billboard Hot 100 | Hot R&B/Hip-Hop Singles & Tracks | Hot Rap Singles | Hot Dance Music/Maxi-Singles Sales |
|---|---|---|---|---|---|
| 1993 | "93 'Til Infinity" | 72 | 65 | 11 | 20 |
| 1993 | "That's When Ya Lost" | — | — | 24 | — |
| 1994 | "Never No More" | — | — | 46 | 15 |
"—" denotes that a recording did not chart.
