= Musical collective =

Group of musicians differing from a band

A musical collective is a type of artist collective for musicians in which membership is flexible and creative control is shared. The concept is distinct from that of a traditional band in that musical collectives allow for flexibility in their rosters, and members are free to rotate in and out of the line-up. Collectives may exist in almost any genre of music, although they have been especially prominent in indie rock and hip hop. They may differ from record labels in that they primarily serve as mutual support for member artists, although some collectives may also serve as a record label for members.

Musical collectives typically consist of artists with similar stylistic interests. Notable musical collectives have included the Soulquarians, Elephant 6, and the Dungeon Family, and Odd Future, among others.

== Notable collectives ==
- #stepTeam
- 1c34
- Acappella
- Alaclair Ensemble
- Ambiances Magnetiques
- AMM
- Amon Düül I
- Amungus
- Animal Collective
- Anticon
- Arcade Fire
- Archive
- Architecture in Helsinki
- Army of the Pharaohs
- Arrogant Sons of Bitches
- ASAP Mob
- The Band
- Bandits of the Acoustic Revolution
- Bankroll Mafia
- Black Hippy
- Black Mountain
- Blocks Recording Club
- Bomb the Music Industry!
- Bran Van 3000
- Bruiser Brigade
- Brockhampton
- Broken Social Scene
- Bugz in the Attic
- The Cake Sale
- Cardboard City
- Cocaine 80s
- The Choir Practice
- Computer Music Center
- Consolidated
- Crack Cloud
- Crass
- Dark World
- The Damnwells
- The Desert Sessions
- Diggin' in the Crates Crew
- Doomtree
- Drain Gang
- Dufay Collective
- Dungeon Family
- Experimental Audio Research
- Early Day Miners
- The Elephant 6 Collective
- The Familiar Ugly
- Fence Collective
- F-IRE Collective
- Godspeed You! Black Emperor
- Grateful Dead
- Griselda Records
- Gungor
- Haunted Mound
- The Hidden Cameras
- Hello! Project
- Henri Faberge and the Adorables
- Hieroglyphics
- Hillsong United
- I'm from Barcelona
- The Jewelled Antler Collective
- Jewelxxet
- Jungle
- Juice Crew
- KMFDM
- La Coka Nostra
- Lansing-Dreiden
- Les Légions Noires
- Living Legends
- Massive Attack
- The Mekons
- MICHELLE
- Mo Thugs
- The Mountain Goats
- Native Tongues
- The New Pornographers
- No-Neck Blues Band
- The Ocean
- Odd Future
- Ozomatli
- Parliament-Funkadelic
- PC Music
- Piano Magic
- The Polyphonic Spree
- Pro Era
- The Reindeer Section
- Raider Klan
- Reptilian Club Boyz
- San Francisco Tape Music Center
- Sault
- Screwed Up Click
- Self Defense Family
- SiIvaGunner
- Silk Road Project
- SMTOWN
- SOB X RBE
- Soul Assassins
- Soul II Soul
- Soulquarians
- So Solid Crew
- Sunburned Hand of the Man
- Swans
- Sweatshop Union
- Tanakh
- TeamSESH
- Trummerflora
- Un Drame Musical Instantane
- Underground Resistance
- Undertow Music
- Ultramagnetic MCs
- Vulfpeck
- Willard Grant Conspiracy
- Willkommen Collective
- The World/Inferno Friendship Society
- Working on Dying
- WZRD
- Wu-Tang Killa Beez
- Yamantaka // Sonic Titan
- YBN
- Zodiak Free Arts Lab (Berlin)

== See also ==
- Collective
- Artist collective
- List of Internet rap collectives
