= Souls of Mischief =

American hip hop group

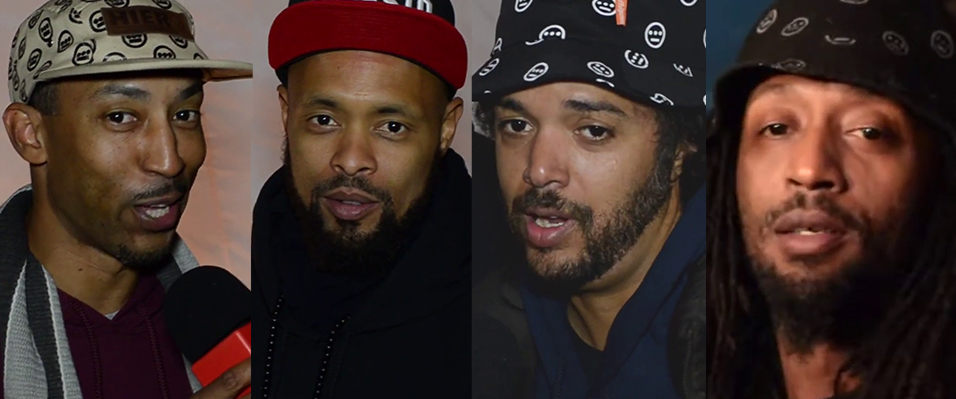
- Souls of Mischief; from left to right: Phesto, Tajai, Opio, A-Plus

Background information
- Origin: East Oakland, California, U.S.
- Genres: West Coast hip hop, alternative hip hop
- Years active: 1991–present
- Labels: Hieroglyphics Imperium, Jive/BMG
- Members: A-Plus; Phesto; Opio; Tajai

Souls of Mischief is a hip hop group from Oakland, California, that is also part of the hip hop collective Hieroglyphics. The Souls of Mischief formed in 1991 and is composed of rappers A-Plus, Opio, Phesto, and Tajai.

== History ==
East Oakland native Tajai began rhyming with future bandmate A-Plus at age 8, while both were in elementary school. Tajai and Phesto met later in junior high school. Tajai recruited his best friend Phesto in middle school and A-Plus brought Opio into the budding act in high school before making its major-label debut on Jive Records with the group's well-received album 93 'til Infinity, in 1993.

The group is part of the hip-hop collective Hieroglyphics, along with emcees Del tha Funkee Homosapien, Casual, Pep Love, Jaybiz, and producer Domino. The group participated as full members in all three of Hieroglyphics' studio albums: 1998's 3rd Eye Vision, 2003's Full Circle, and 2013's The Kitchen.

93 ’til Infinity is the group's highest charting album to date (No. 17 Top R&B/Hip Hop Albums; No. 85 Billboard 200) and, in January, 1998, was named one of the Top 100 Rap albums by The Source magazine.

The group stayed with Jive for one more album, 1995's No Man's Land, before being released from the label during the same year.

The group released two albums on Hiero's self-owned independent label, Hieroglyphics Imperium Recordings: 1998's Focus, and 2000's Trilogy: Conflict, Climax, Resolution.

On October 30, 2006, Hierocast (Hieroglyphics' official podcast), Del tha Funkee Homosapien reported that the Souls of Mischief was currently working on its next studio album with Prince Paul (De La Soul, Gravediggaz, Handsome Boy Modeling School).

On January 6, 2009, Souls of Mischief released the Tour Stories EP produced by Domino and co-produced by Prince Paul. The song is taken from the group's fifth studio album, Montezuma's Revenge, released on Hieroglyphics Imperium.

In 2013, a documentary about the band was released entitled Til Infinity: The Souls of Mischief. Produced and directed by Shomari Smith, it reflected on the 20-year anniversary of the band's debut album 93 'Til Infinity and includes over 50 interviews with prominent MCs, DJs, and producers of the era.

During the 2017 NBA Playoffs, Gatorade released a television commercial promoting Gatorade Flow, which featured Indiana Pacers star forward Paul George and the instrumental music of Souls of Mischief' 93 'Til Infinity.

== Discography ==
=== Studio albums ===
List of studio albums, with selected chart positions
Title	Album details	Peak chart positions			
Title	Album details	US	US Ind.	US R&B	US Rap
93 'til Infinity	Released: September 28, 1993; Label: Jive; Format: CD, LP, cassette, digital download	85	—	17	—
No Man's Land	Released: October 10, 1995; Label: Jive; Format: CD, LP, cassette, digital download	111	—	27	—
Focus	Released: April 20, 1998; Label: Hieroglyphics Imperium; Format: LP, cassette, digital download	—	—	—	—
Trilogy: Conflict, Climax, Resolution	Released: October 24, 2000; Label: Hieroglyphics Imperium; Format: CD, LP, cassette, digital download	—	37	—	—
Montezuma's Revenge	Released: December 1, 2009; Label: Clear Label; Format: CD, LP, digital download	—	—	93	—
There Is Only Now	Released: August 26, 2014; Label: Linear Labs; Format: CD, LP, cassette, digital download	—	—	35	20
"—" denotes a recording that did not chart or was not released in that territory.

=== Singles ===
List of singles, with selected chart positions, showing year released and album name
Title	Year	Peak chart positions				Certifications	Album
Title	Year	US	US Dance Sales	US R&B	US Rap	Certifications	Album
"That's When Ya Lost"	1993	—	—	— (Note: "That's When Ya Lost" did not enter the Hot R&B/Hip-Hop Songs chart, but peaked at number twenty-two on the Bubbling Under R&B/Hip-Hop Singles chart.)	24		93 'til Infinity
"93 'til Infinity"	1993	72	20	65	11	RIAA: Platinum; BPI: Gold	93 'til Infinity
"Get the Girl, Grab the Money and Run"	1994	—	23	—	50		A Low Down Dirty Shame soundtrack
"Never No More"	1994	—	15	— (Note: "Never No More" did not enter the Hot R&B/Hip-Hop Songs chart, but peaked at number twenty on the Bubbling Under R&B/Hip-Hop Singles chart.)	46		93 'til Infinity
"Rock It Like That"	1995	—	22	— (Note: "Rock It Like That" did not enter the Hot R&B/Hip-Hop Songs chart, but peaked at number seventeen on the Bubbling Under R&B/Hip-Hop Singles chart.)	44		No Man's Land
"Fa Sho Fa Real"	1995	—	—	—	—		No Man's Land
"Shooting Stars"	1999	—	—	—	—		Focus
"Step Off"	1999	—	—	—	—		Focus
"Medication"	2000	—	—	—	—		Trilogy: Conflict, Climax, Resolution
"Bad Business"	2000	—	—	—	—		Trilogy: Conflict, Climax, Resolution
"Acupuncture"	2000	—	—	—	—		Trilogy: Conflict, Climax, Resolution
"Soundscience"	2000	—	—	—	—		Trilogy: Conflict, Climax, Resolution
"Tour Stories"	2009	—	—	—	—		Montezuma's Revenge
"Proper Aim"	2009	—	—	—	—		Montezuma's Revenge
"—" denotes a recording that did not chart or was not released in that territory.
