= Pep Love =

American rapper

- Also known as: Pep Lava
- Born: Pallo Peacock; Jackson, Mississippi, U.S.
- Origin: Oakland, California, U.S.
- Genres: Hip hop, rap
- Years active: 1991–present
- Labels: Hieroglyphics Imperium, UnHerdUnScene
- Website: peplove.bandcamp.com

Pallo Peacock, known professionally as Pep Love, is a hip hop artist and a member of the Oakland, California-based hip hop collective Hieroglyphics.

== Early life ==
Pep Love was born and raised in Jackson, Mississippi. He relocated with his family to Oakland, California as a teenager.

== Discography ==
=== Albums ===
- Ascension (2001)
- Ascension Side C (2003)
- The Shamen (2003) (with Jay Biz)
- The Foundation (2005)
- Rigmarole (2012)
- Fallacy Fantasy (2014) (with Opio as First Light)
- Acres of Diamonds (2024)

=== Extended plays ===
- Dolla Daily (2014)
- Fly Philosophy (2017)
- Magnam Ostium (2020)

=== Singles ===
- "Crooked Angles" (2000)
- "Fight Club" (2001)
- "T.A.M.I." (2002)
- "Prayful' Hate" (2016) OKLM.
