= A-Plus (rapper) =

American rapper and producer (born 1975)

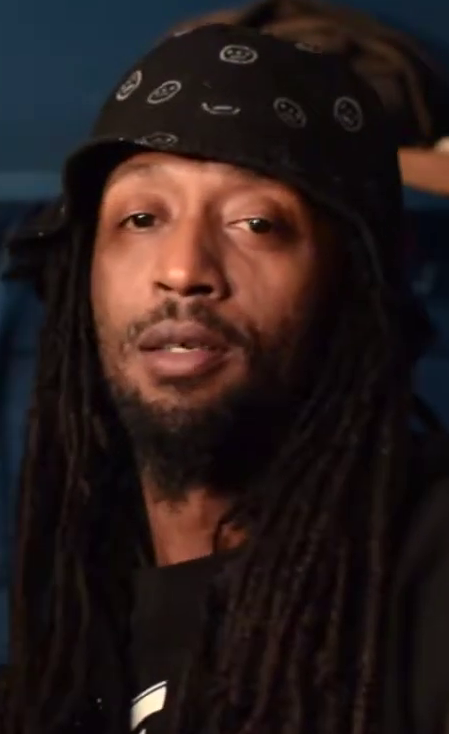
- A-Plus in 2022

Background information
- Also known as: A-Plus
- Born: Adam Carter; April 15, 1975 (age 51); Denver, Colorado, U.S.
- Origin: Oakland, California, U.S.
- Genres: Hip hop
- Occupations: Rapper; songwriter; record producer
- Instruments: Microphone, sampler
- Years active: 1991–present
- Labels: Hieroglyphics Imperium Recordings; Jive Records
- Member of: Souls of Mischief, Hieroglyphics
- Website: http://www.hieroglyphics.com

Adam Carter (born April 15, 1975), known by the stage name, A-Plus, is an American rapper and producer. He is one of the founding four members of the Oakland, California-based underground hip hop group Souls of Mischief and, with Souls of Mischief, a part of the eight-person, alternative hip hop collective, the Hieroglyphics.

== Biography ==
Born in Denver, Colorado as the son of Jamaican immigrants, A-Plus moved to Oakland, California with his family when he was 5 years old. In kindergarten, A-Plus met future Hieroglyphics member, Casual, and in elementary school, met fellow Souls of Mischief member Tajai. Tajai eventually introduced A-Plus to future Souls of Mischief members Phesto and Opio, and the group formed in high school before releasing their debut album, 93 'til Infinity on Jive Records in 1993.

A-Plus has contributed to all four Souls of Mischief albums, as well as the two Hieroglyphic studio albums. He has also produced or performed on solo projects of various Hieroglyphics members.

In 2005, A-Plus released a remix album, Pleemix, Vol. 1, through Hieroglyphics Imperium Recordings. On May 1, 2007, A-Plus released his debut solo album, My Last Good Deed.

== Discography ==
=== Solo albums ===
- 2007: My Last Good Deed
- 2011: Pepper Spray (EP)
- 2014: Molly's Dirty Water

== See also ==
- Category:Albums produced by A-Plus (rapper)
