= Wanna Buy a Monkey? =

Compilation album by Dan the Automator
- Released: February 19, 2002
- Genre: Hip hop
- Length: 56:18
- Label: Sequence Records
- Producer: Dan the Automator

Dan the Automator chronology
A Much Better Tomorrow (2000)	Wanna Buy a Monkey? (2002)	Dan the Automator Presents 2K7 (2006)

Wanna Buy a Monkey? is a compilation album by Dan the Automator. It was released on Sequence Records in 2002. It peaked at number 42 on the Billboard Heatseekers Albums chart, as well as number 28 on the Independent Albums chart. The album's title derives from a line in the film Cabin Boy.

== Critical reception ==
Professional ratings
Aggregate scores
Source	Rating
Metacritic	72/100
Review scores
Source	Rating
AllMusic	4.5/5 stars
Robert Christgau	(2-star Honorable Mention)
NME	3/5 stars
Pitchfork	4.0/10
PopMatters	favorable
San Francisco Chronicle	4/5 stars

At Metacritic, which assigns a weighted average score out of 100 to reviews from mainstream critics, the album received an average score of 72, based on 10 reviews, indicating "generally favorable reviews".

John Bush of AllMusic gave the album 4.5 out of 5 stars, stating that "Wanna Buy a Monkey? doesn't just collect a few of his rarer credits, but fits them into one of the best mix albums of the year." Rob Mitchum of Pitchfork gave the album a 4.0 out of 10, writing: "Part of the problem lies in the musically segregated organization of the album, as the Automator's hip-hop selections are clumped into the front and back, while the indie-friendly picks comprise the creamy center."

== Track listing ==
No.	Title	Artist(s)	Length
1.	"Intro"	Fantômas	1:23
2.	"Rockin' It"	Brand Nubian	3:33
3.	"Smoothness" / "Freestyle"	Black Rob / Encore	4:36
4.	"Positive Contact"	Deltron 3030	4:08
5.	"Le soleil est près de moi" (Dan the Automator remix)	Air	6:35
6.	"Destiny"	Zero 7	4:48
7.	"Seneca"	Tortoise	4:05
8.	"Firesuite"	Doves	2:04
9.	"Stroker Ace"	Lovage	3:57
10.	"The Rhumba"	Bobby Digital	3:39
11.	"Latin Simone" (Dan's Original)	Gorillaz	3:08
12.	"Bionix"	De La Soul	2:16
13.	"Don't Understand" (featuring Greg Nice)	Masta Ace	1:44
14.	"Don't Get It Twisted" (featuring Sadat X)	Jigmastas	2:28
15.	"X-Ecutioners (Theme) Song" (featuring Dan the Automator)	The X-Ecutioners	4:01
16.	"Clockwork"	Dilated Peoples	3:53
Total length:			56:18

== Charts ==
Chart	Peak position
US Heatseekers Albums (Billboard)	42
US Independent Albums (Billboard)	28
