= A Much Better Tomorrow =

Studio album by Dan the Automator
- Released: July 18, 2000
- Studios: The Glue Factory, San Francisco, California, U.S.
- Genre: Hip hop
- Length: 53:13
- Label: 75 Ark
- Producer: Dan the Automator

Dan the Automator chronology
| A Much Better Tomorrow (2000) | Wanna Buy a Monkey? (2002) |

A Much Better Tomorrow is the debut studio album by Dan the Automator. It was released on 75 Ark in 2000. It is the expanded version of his 1996 EP, A Better Tomorrow. It features guest appearances from Kool Keith, Neph the Madman, and Poet.

== Critical reception ==
Professional ratings
Review scores
| Source | Rating |
|---|---|
| AllMusic | 4/5 stars |
| Brainwashed | favorable |
| Robert Christgau | (1-star Honorable Mention) |
| NME | 3/5 stars |
| RapReviews | 9.5/10 |
| Select | 3/5 medals |

John Bush of AllMusic stated that the tracks sound "a bit aimless without at least an occasional rap in front of them." Thomas Quinlan of Exclaim! praised Dan the Automator and Kool Keith's collaborative tracks, stating that they "all demonstrate a creative partnership that is rarely found in hip-hop." He called Dan the Automator "a producer who can make beats that expose the various personalities of Kool Keith's different characters."

== Track listing ==
All tracks are written by Dan the Automator and Kool Keith, except where noted.

| No. | Title | Writer(s) | Length |
|---|---|---|---|
| 1. | "A Better Tomorrow" (featuring Kool Keith) | | 5:57 |
| 2. | "King of NY" (featuring Kool Keith) | | 3:53 |
| 3. | "I Want da Mic" (featuring Kool Keith) | | 3:51 |
| 4. | "Sleep" | Dan the Automator | 5:10 |
| 5. | "Wiling" (featuring Neph the Madman) | Dan the Automator; Nephtali Lewis | 3:56 |
| 6. | "Cartoon Capers" (featuring Kool Keith) | | 4:44 |
| 7. | "4:17" | Dan the Automator | 3:46 |
| 8. | "Buck Buck" (featuring Poet) | Dan the Automator; Siwatu Kamau | 4:25 |
| 9. | "The Truth" | Dan the Automator | 4:59 |
| 10. | "It's Over Now" (featuring Kool Keith) | | 5:32 |
| 11. | "A Better Tomorrow Pt. 2" (featuring Kool Keith) | | 7:00 |
| Total length: | | | 53:13 |

== Personnel ==
Credits adapted from liner notes.

- Kool Keith – vocals (1, 2, 3, 6, 10, 11)
- DJ Qbert – turntables (3)
- Brandon Arnovick – guitar (4)
- Neph the Madman – vocals (5)
- Sweet "P" – cartoon voices (6)
- Poet – vocals (8)
- Dan the Automator – production, mixing
- Howie Weinberg – mastering
- Christie Rixford – artwork
- Chris Veltri – photography
