= Got a Girl =

American musical duo

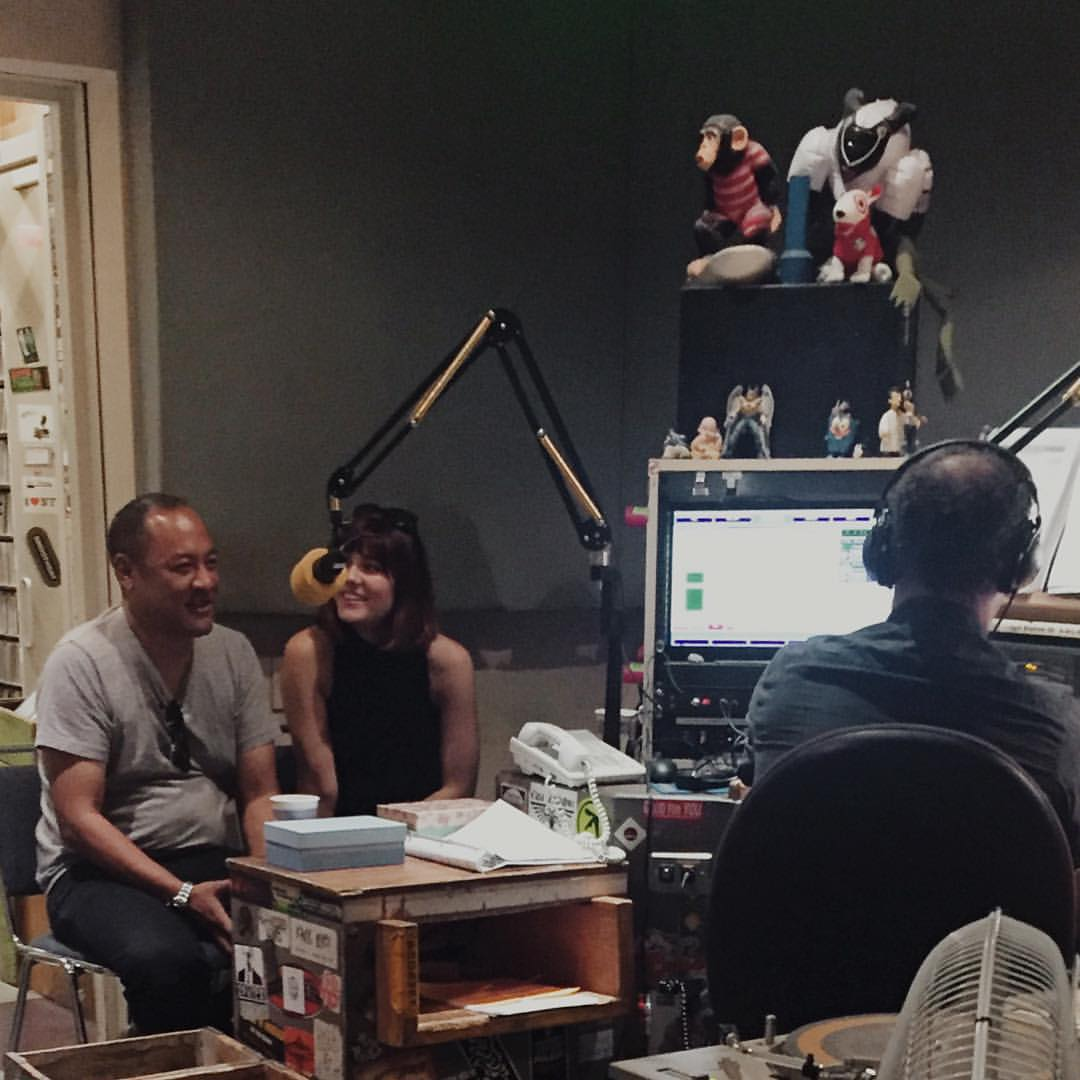
- Got a Girl in 2015

Background information
- Origin: Los Angeles, California, U.S.
- Genres: French pop, hip-hop, trip hop, indie pop, jazz
- Years active: 2012–present
- Label: Bulk Recordings
- Members: Mary Elizabeth Winstead; Dan the Automator
- Website: got-a-girl.com

Got a Girl is an American musical duo formed in 2012 consisting of singer Mary Elizabeth Winstead and music producer Dan "The Automator" Nakamura. The band's first studio album, I Love You but I Must Drive Off This Cliff Now, was released in 2014.

== History ==
According to Exclaim!, Got a Girl originated in 2010, when the pair met at a cast dinner of Scott Pilgrim vs. the World which co-starred Winstead. Nakamura had contributed music to the film, and she approached him saying she was a fan. At the film's red carpet premiere, Nakamura asked Winstead if they could "make music together".

Winstead and Nakamura worked together musically on Deltron 3030's album Event 2 (released 2013), which Nakamura produced and Winstead provided vocals for the songs "The Agony" and "Look Across the Sky".

In May 2012, The Playlist reported that Winstead and Nakamura were working on a record. Winstead had previously sung an a cappella cover of the song "Baby It's You" by the Shirelles for the 2007 film Death Proof, and co-wrote and recorded a demo with music producer Thai Long Ly. Winstead and Dan had also performed an original song at the SXSW in March 2013.

On July 22, 2014, the duo released I Love You but I Must Drive Off This Cliff Now on Bulk Recordings.

In September 2015, they embarked on a four-city tour of Seattle, San Francisco, New York City, and Los Angeles, where they played their entire album live, including a cover of Handsome Boy Modeling School's "I've Been Thinking".

== Discography ==
=== Albums ===
- I Love You but I Must Drive Off This Cliff Now (2014)

=== Singles ===
- "You and Me (Board Mix)" (2013)
- "I'm Down" (2013)
- "Did We Live Too Fast?" (2014)
- "There's a Revolution" (2014)
