= Andrew Karpen =

American film executive (1966–2025)

- Born: April 18, 1966
- Died: April 28, 2025 (aged 59); Fairfield County, Connecticut, U.S.
- Occupations: Film executive and producer

Andrew Karpen (April 18, 1966 – April 28, 2025) was an American independent film executive and producer. He was the founder and CEO of Bleecker Street. He was previously the co-CEO of Focus Features. He was an executive producer for the films Denial (2016), The Man Who Invented Christmas (2017), The Last Word (2017), The Art of Self-Defense (2019), Golda (2023), The Return (2024), and Hard Truths (2024).

Karpen died of glioblastoma in Fairfield County, Connecticut, on April 28, 2025, at the age of 59.
