= Music to Make Love to Your Old Lady By =

Studio album by Lovage
- Released: November 6, 2001
- Genres: Downtempo, trip hop
- Length: 59:43
- Labels: 75 Ark, Bulk
- Producer: Dan the Automator

Lovage chronology
Lovage EP (2001)	Music to Make Love to Your Old Lady By (2001)

Nathaniel Merriweather Presents... Lovage: Music to Make Love to Your Old Lady By is the only studio album by Lovage. It was released by 75 Ark in 2001, with current reissues done by Bulk. It peaked at number 37 on the Billboard Independent Albums chart.

== Artwork ==
The album's artwork is a homage to the cover of Serge Gainsbourg's album N° 2.

== Critical reception ==
Professional ratings
Aggregate scores
Source	Rating
Metacritic	66/100
Review scores
Source	Rating
AllMusic	2.5/5 stars
Blender	3/5 stars
NME	7/10
Pitchfork	4.5/10
Q	4/5 stars
Spin	7/10

At Metacritic, which assigns a weighted average score out of 100 to reviews from mainstream critics, the album received an average score of 66 based on 12 reviews, indicating "generally favorable reviews".

M. F. DiBella of AllMusic gave the album 2.5 stars out of 5, saying: "[While Dan the Automator is] quite possibly one of the most accomplished beat processors in the realm of art hip-hop/electronica, his strict-composer approach on this project is occasionally inaccessible and at times unlistenable." Kevin Adickes of Pitchfork gave the album a 4.5 out of 10, saying: "My biggest gripe about Lovage is that it finds a number of clearly talented artists constructing the same song continually without variation." Kylee Swenson of Blender gave the album 3 stars out of 5, saying: "Lovage is music to put ladies in the mood, and it works both as satire and actual make-out fare."

== Track listing ==
All tracks are written by Dan the Automator, Mike Patton, and Jennifer Charles, except "Sex (I'm a ...)" written by John Crawford, David Diamond, and Terri Nunn.

No.	Title	Length
1.	"Ladies Love Chest Rockwell"	1:19
2.	"Pit Stop (Take Me Home)"	3:56
3.	"Anger Management"	4:17
4.	"Everyone Has a Summer"	4:16
5.	"To Catch a Thief"	3:17
6.	"Lies and Alibis"	3:16
7.	"Herbs, Good Hygiene & Socks"	1:55
8.	"Book of the Month"	4:28
9.	"Lifeboat"	4:45
10.	"Strangers on a Train"	4:36
11.	"Lovage (Love That Lovage, Baby)"	1:04
12.	"Sex (I'm a...)"	6:19
13.	"Koala's Lament"	3:53
14.	"Tea Time with Maseo"	1:38
15.	"Stroker Ace"	4:29
16.	"Archie & Veronica"	6:05
Total length:		59:43

Instrumental version
No.	Title	Length
1.	"Pit Stop (Take Me Home)"	3:59
2.	"Anger Management"	4:21
3.	"To Catch a Thief"	3:17
4.	"Book of the Month"	4:38
5.	"Lifeboat (Officer and a Gentleman)"	4:51
6.	"Strangers on a Train"	4:38
7.	"Sex (I'm a ...)"	6:19
8.	"Stroker Ace"	4:36
9.	"Archie & Veronica"	5:11
10.	"Lies and Alibis"	3:41
11.	"Koala's Lament"	3:54
12.	"Everyone Has a Summer"	4:58
Total length:		54:22

== Personnel ==
Credits adapted from liner notes.

- Dan the Automator – production, mixing
- Mike Patton – vocals
- Jennifer Charles – vocals
- Astacio the Nudist – guitar
- SweetP – harpsichord, nose flute
- Kid Koala – turntables
- Daniel Spills – keyboards (3, 5, 9, 16)
- Chest Rockwell – vocals (1)
- Afrika Bambaataa – vocals (7)
- Sir Damien Thorne VII of the Cockfoster's Clan – vocals (11)
- Chármelle Carmel – vocals (14)
- Howie Weinberg – mastering
- James Dawson – photography
- Brandon Arnovick – layout

== Charts ==
Chart	Peak position
US Independent Albums (Billboard)	37
