= Emily Wells =

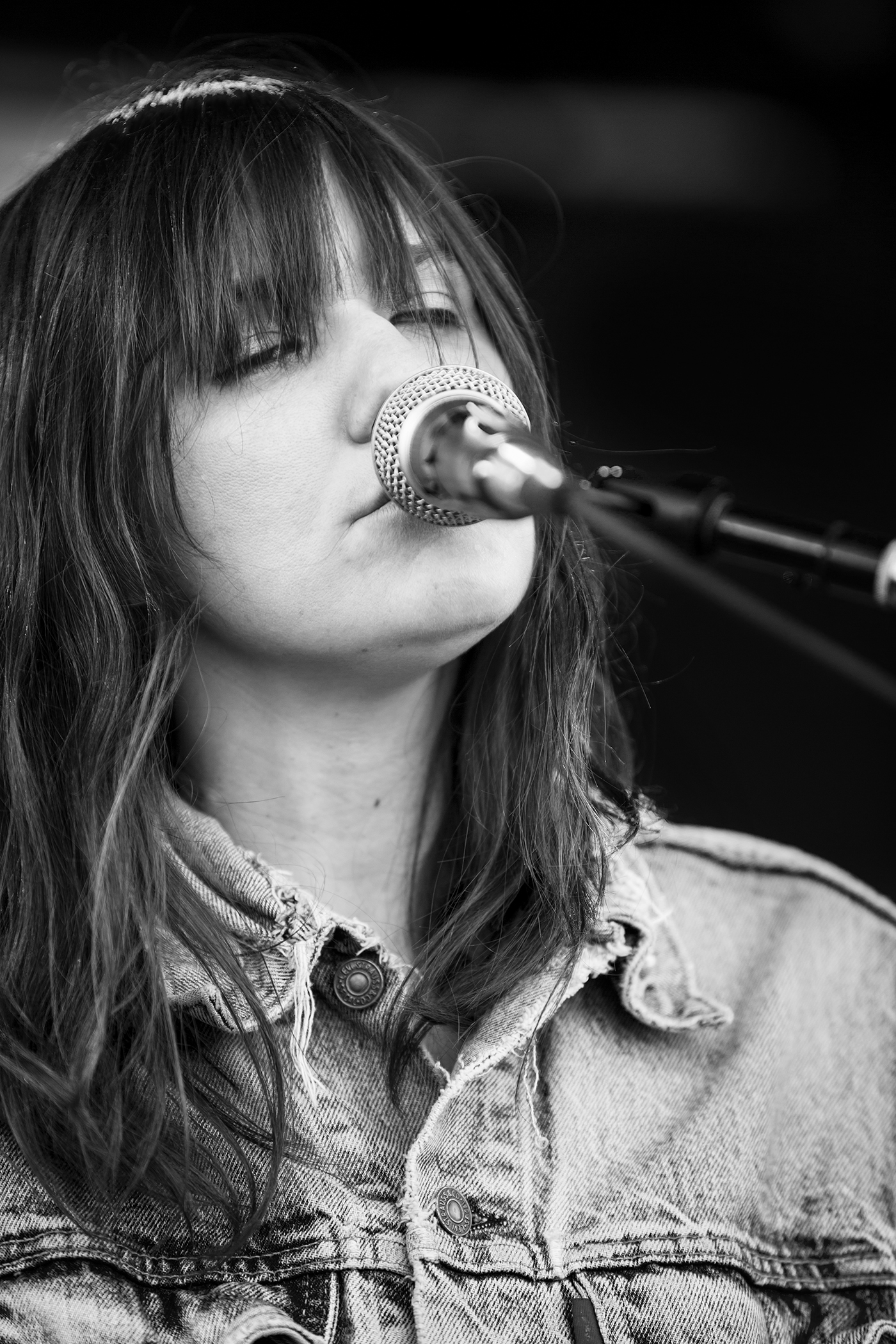
- Wells performing at Treefort Music Fest 2015

Background information
- Born: November 20, 1981 (age 44); Amarillo, Texas, United States
- Genres: Alternative, experimental, classical
- Occupations: Musician, composer, arranger, producer
- Instruments: Violin, piano, cello, viola, guitar, drum programming, synthesizer, etc.
- Years active: 1999–present
- Labels: Partisan Records, Creative Control Records, Thesis + Instinct Records, Lefse Records
- Website: EmilyWellsMusic.com

Emily Wells (born November 20, 1981) is an American multi-instrumentalist, vocalist, composer, arranger, and producer whose genres encompass alternative, experimental, hip-hop and classical. In addition to playing instruments such as violin and analog synthesizers, she uses loops, sample pads, and acoustic drums to achieve a layered effect.

== Early life ==
Emily Wells was born in Amarillo, Texas, United States. Her father was a music minister, and Wells began playing the violin at age four. In 1990 she moved with her family to Indianapolis, Indiana, where she lived until she began traveling in 2000. While traveling she made her residence primarily in New York, where she would later move after an 8-year stay in Los Angeles.

== Music career ==
=== Early solo albums (2000-2010) ===
At age thirteen she began issuing her own recordings on cassette, starting with an unofficial release with 100 copies. After several unofficial tapes, in 2000 she "took up" with Epic Records but did not actually sign with them. Beautiful Sleepyhead & the Laughing Yaks was her official full-length debut in 2006, with all the tracks written, performed, produced, and mixed by Wells. Her sophomore album The Symphonies featured bassist Joey Reina and drummer Sam Halterman alongside Wells.

Wells was interviewed and performed "Symphony 1 in the Barrel of a Gun" on episode four of Last Call with Carson Daly, which aired through NBC on September 18, 2009. In September 2010, after recently moving from Los Angeles to New York, Wells was joined onstage by vocalist and harmonium player Shilpa Ray. The performance was positively reviewed by The New Yorker.

=== Mama and Partisan Records (2012) ===
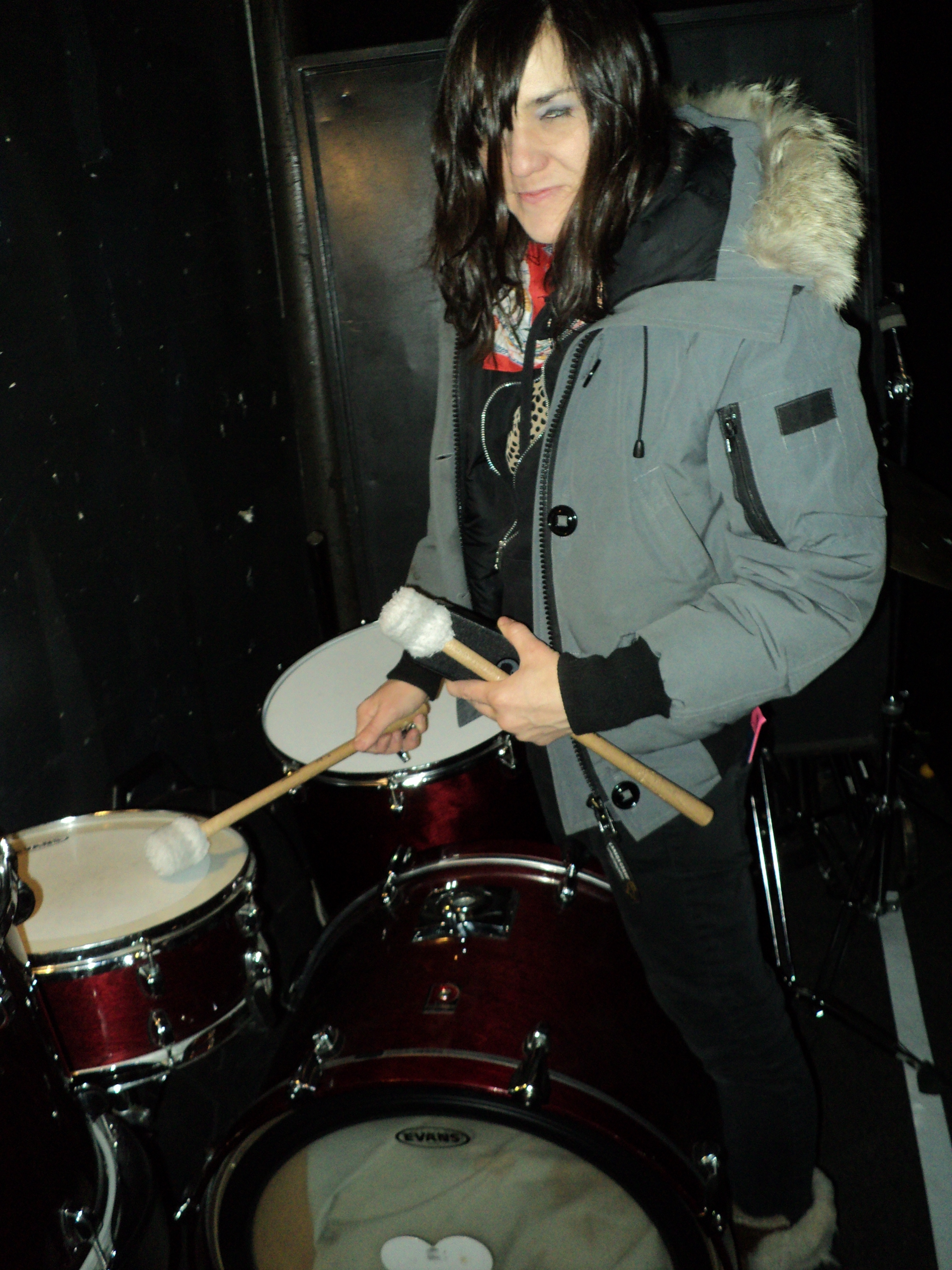
Wells tuning her drums before her show at Treefort Music Fest 2013 at the Neurolux in Boise, Idaho

External videos
- Emily Wells - "Mama's Gonna Give You Love" Music Video (July 2012)

In 2012, she released her full-length album Mama through Partisan Records.

The lead single, "Mama's Gonna give You Love," was featured in The New Yorker on April 10, 2012. She also released a free remixed version of Mama on Partisan, with remixers such as Jeremiah Jae, Kid Koala, Baths, and Deerhoof. As of 2012 she was collaborating on material with Clint Mansell, a scorewriter and former frontman of Pop Will Eat Itself. That April 2012 she created a featured mixtape for Magnet Magazine, and Wells has periodically performed live sessions for recording studios, websites, and radio stations, including Daytrotter in April 2012, WYNC's Soundcheck in May 2013, Laundro Matinee in October 2014, and KCRW in June 2013.

=== Tour diaries and soundtracks (2013) ===
Wells has written tour diaries and articles for such publications as American Songwriter, Impose Magazine, and The Huffington Post, and she has appeared live multiple times on NPR, with an interview on All Songs Considered on April 4, 2013, and a live performance on KCRW on July 11, 2013. In 2013 she composed a song for director Park Chan-Wook's movie Stoker and toured South Korea promoting the film. A single titled "Passenger" for a then upcoming acoustic version of Mama was released in 2013. The Guardian named her New Band of the Week No. 1,503 on April 30, 2013.

An acoustic version of Mama was released in on June 11, 2013, in the United States and United Kingdom through Partisan Records. It had been recorded with a Tascam 388, with no digital effects added to the basic instrumentation. Her songwriting methods were featured in a July 2013 edition of Performer Magazine. Among other shows, Wells performed at Le Guess Who? festival in The Netherlands in November 2013, and also that year she collaborated live with Questlove at Electronium in 2013. She performed with The Roots and Aloe Blacc at the Rock the Clinton Global Initiative event that year as well.

=== Recent projects and tours (2014-2015) ===
"Mama's Gonna Give You Love" was used in the January 2015 trailer for season 3 of the TV series Bates Motel. On March 27, 2015, Wells gave a well-received keynote at Hackfort2 at the fourth annual Treefort Music Fest in Boise, Idaho wherein she presented her methods of composition at the intersection of art and technology and the growth of her sensibility as a musician. Performing with a reduced kit sans drums, she played earlier and later versions of her song "So, Sunday." She headlined on the main stage on the final day of the Treefort in 2015 and participated in the festival's Yogafort as well.

Wells was also broadcast on air by WQXR in March 2015, when she performed at Ecstatic Music Festival for the 80th birthday party of Terry Riley, along with other musicians such as Marco Benevento, Nancy Whang, and Face the Music. Since 2016 she has released three full-length albums on the imprint Thesis and Instinct.

== Style and influences ==
"Wells [is a] virtuoso musician, and she dabbles in electronica, shades of folk and jazz, even classical and hip-hop, creating interesting tableaux and textures that are by turns airy and luminous, and spare and haunting."
— iTunes editors, 2008

In 2015, Wells stated that amongst her influences are the music theorist John Cage, the minimalist composer Philip Glass, and the hip-hop group Wu-Tang Clan.

== Discography ==
Solo releases by Emily Wells
Year	Name	Label	Release details
1999	Midori Sour	Self-released	1999
2002	Shadow Box	Self-released	2002
2004	Music for Geek Love	Self-released	2004
2005	Making Static	Self-released	2005
2007	Beautiful Sleepyhead & the Laughing Yaks	Edub Productions	Apr 12, 2007
2008	The Symphonies: Dreams, Memories & Parties	Creative Control Records	Jul 08, 2008
2012	Mama	Partisan Records	Apr 10, 2012
2013	Mama (Acoustic Recordings)	Partisan Records	Jun 11, 2013
2016	Promise	Thesis and Instinct	Jan 29, 2016
2017	In the Hot	Thesis and Instinct	Mar 03, 2017
2019	This World Is Too _____ for You	Thesis and Instinct	Mar 22, 2019
2022	Regards to the End	Thesis and Instinct	Feb 25, 2022

=== EPs ===
Solo EPs by Emily Wells
Year	Name	Release details
2009	Dirty	Creative Control Records (2009)

=== Singles ===
Incomplete list of songs by Emily Wells
Year	Title	Album	Release details
2008	"O Holy Night"	Single only	Creative Control (Oct 10, 2008)
2012	"Becomes the Color"	Single only	Milan Entertainment (Oct 30, 2012)

=== Collaborations ===
Year	Name	Label	Release details
2013	Pillowfight (Emily Wells with Dan the Automator)	Bulk Recordings/EMI	2013

=== Guest appearances ===
Selected songs featuring Emily Wells
Year	Single name	Primary artist(s)	Album	Release details
2008	"Symphony 3: The Story" (with Emily Wells)	Dwight Farrell	The Symphonies	Creative Control (2008)
2008	"Gee Whiz" (with Emily Wells)	Buck 65	Dirtbike 1/3	(Aug 2008)
2013	"Becomes the Color" (ft. Emily Wells)	Various	Stoker soundtrack	Scott Free Productions (Jan 20, 2013)
2013	"If I Ever Had a Heart" (ft. Emily Wells)	Various	Stoker soundtrack	Scott Free Productions (Jan 20, 2013)
2013	"My Only Love" (ft. Emily Wells)	Deltron 3030	Event 2	Bulk Recordings (Sept 30, 2013)

== Personal life ==
Wells is queer.

== See also ==
- List of violinists
