= Deltron 3030 (album) =

Studio album by Deltron 3030
- Released: May 23, 2000
- Recorded: 1999–2000
- Studios: The Glue Factory (San Francisco, CA)
- Genres: Alternative hip-hop, underground hip-hop, hip hopera
- Length: 60:18
- Labels: 75 Ark, Traffic Entertainment Group (2008 reissue)
- Producer: Dan the Automator

Deltron 3030 chronology
Deltron 3030 (2000)	Event 2 (2013)

Singles from Deltron 3030
- 1. "Time Keeps On Slipping" Released: 17 October 2000; 2. "3030" Released: 17 October 2000

Professional ratings
Review scores
Source	Rating
AllMusic	5/5 stars
Alternative Press	4/5
The Guardian	5/5 stars
Los Angeles Times	3/4 stars
Melody Maker	4/5 stars
NME	8/10
Pitchfork	8.8/10
Q	4/5 stars
The Rolling Stone Album Guide	3/5 stars
Spin	7/10

Deltron 3030 is the debut album by the hip-hop supergroup Deltron 3030, which consists of rapper Del the Funky Homosapien, producer Dan the Automator, and DJ Kid Koala. It was released on May 23, 2000, by 75 Ark. The album was reissued on July 1, 2008, with 3 bonus remixes. The album's cover features a photograph of the Perisphere, a structure constructed for the 1939 New York World's Fair.

It is a rap opera concept album set in a dystopian year 3030. The album's story casts Del in the role of Deltron Zero, a disillusioned mech soldier and interplanetary computer prodigy rebelling against a 31st-century New World Order. In a world where evil oligarchs suppress both human rights and hip-hop, Del fights rap battles against a series of foes, becoming Galactic Rhyme Federation Champion. Del's lyrics veer from serious social commentary to humor to epic sci-fi battles, while producer Dan the Automator creates an eerie and dense atmosphere.

== Track listing ==
All tracks are written by Dan Nakamura and Teren Jones, except "Time Keeps On Slipping" co-written with Damon Albarn and "Memory Loss" co-written with Sean Lennon.

No.	Title	Length
1.	"State of the Nation" (featuring Damon Albarn)	0:25
2.	"3030"	7:29
3.	"The Fantabulous Rap Extravaganza" (featuring Prince Paul)	0:21
4.	"Things You Can Do"	4:59
5.	"Positive Contact"	4:42
6.	"St. Catherine St." (featuring Beans, Mr. Lif, P. Wingerter, Peanut Butter Wolf, Verna Brown)	0:43
7.	"Virus"	4:26
8.	"Upgrade (A Brymar College Course)"	4:10
9.	"New Coke" (featuring Mark Ramos-Nishita)	0:41
10.	"Mastermind"	3:34
11.	"National Movie Review" (featuring Brad Roberts)	0:53
12.	"Madness"	4:38
13.	"Meet Cleofis Randolph the Patriarch" (featuring Paul Barman)	0:36
14.	"Time Keeps On Slipping" (featuring Damon Albarn)	4:59
15.	"The News (A Wholly Owned Subsidiary of Microsoft, Inc.)" (featuring Hafdís Huld)	0:49
16.	"Turbulence" (remixed by Mark Bell)	3:33
17.	"The Fantabulous Rap Extravaganza Part II" (featuring Prince Paul)	0:37
18.	"Battlesong"	4:07
19.	"Love Story"	3:26
20.	"Memory Loss" (featuring Sean Lennon)	4:39
21.	"The Assmann 640 Speaks" (featuring Damon Albarn)	0:31
Total length:		60:18

2008 reissue bonus tracks
No.	Title	Length
22.	"Positive Contact" (Charlie Clouser remix)	4:56
23.	"Turbulence" (Mark Bell remix)	4:18
24.	"Positive Contact" (Mario C remix)	3:56

== Personnel ==
- Mark Bell – remixing
- V. Brown – vocals
- Dan the Automator – producer
- Del the Funky Homosapien – vocals, lyricist
- Scott Harding – engineer
- Kid Koala – DJ
- Sean Lennon – vocals
- Money Mark – vocals
- Brad Roberts – vocals
- P. Wingerter – vocals
- Damon Albarn – vocals, melodica, additional instrumentation

== Charts ==
Year	Chart	Peak position
2000	Heatseekers	13
2000	Billboard 200	194
2000	Top Independent Albums	43
2000	Top R&B/Hip-Hop Albums	90
