= Dual (2022 film) =

2022 American film by Riley Stearns

- Theatrical release poster
- Directed by: Riley Stearns
- Written by: Riley Stearns
- Produced by: Nate Bolotin; Aram Tertzakian; Lee Kim; Riley Stearns; Nick Spicer; Maxime Cottray
- Starring: Karen Gillan; Beulah Koale; Theo James; Aaron Paul
- Cinematography: Michael Ragen
- Edited by: Sarah Beth Shapiro
- Music by: Emma Ruth Rundle
- Production companies: XYZ Films; IPR.VC; Resolute Films and Entertainment
- Distributed by: RLJE Films
- Release dates: January 22, 2022 (Sundance); April 15, 2022 (United States)
- Running time: 95 minutes
- Country: United States
- Language: English
- Budget: $4.5 million
- Box office: $425,909

Dual is a 2022 American satirical science fiction thriller film written, directed, and produced by Riley Stearns. It stars Karen Gillan, Beulah Koale, Theo James, and Aaron Paul. The plot follows a woman who has to fight a clone of herself to the death after she unexpectedly recovers from a terminal illness. The film premiered at the 2022 Sundance Film Festival on January 22, 2022. It was released in the United States on April 15, 2022, by RLJE Films.

== Plot ==
In the near future, Sarah is a depressed alcoholic in a lacklustre relationship with her boyfriend Peter and generally disconnected from her pestering mother. One day, Sarah awakens to find a pool of blood in her bed and later learns she is terminally ill. To save those she cares about from the pain of losing her, Sarah opts for the creation of a clone of herself, to be trained to act like her and to take her place after her death.

Sarah gives her clone "Sarah's Double" the basic knowledge of her interests and lifestyle; however, Sarah's Double seems to develop her own distinct personality. Ten months after her initial diagnosis, Sarah is informed that she has, inexplicably, gone into full remission, and that she is going to live. When she arrives at her mother's house to share the good news, she finds Peter and Sarah's Double there and is furious to discover that Sarah's Double has been in contact with her mother for quite some time, against her wishes. With the truth now exposed, Sarah tries to return things to normal and demands her clone to be "decommissioned", only to be rejected by Peter, as well as her mother, both of whom prefer the clone.

Sarah is told that Sarah's Double has requested to stay alive, meaning that, by law, the two will have to participate in a publicized duel to the death. To prepare for the duel, Sarah takes up combat classes with a trainer, Trent. For the next year, Sarah improves herself both physically and mentally, learning to tolerate violence, and how clone duels operate. Feeling confident, Sarah meets up with Peter to state that she means no ill will but promises to unapologetically kill her clone.

While training with Trent at his gym, Sarah spots her clone on the street, watching her, and chases her to a nearby playground. There, they talk over their situation before Sarah's Double takes Sarah to a support group for people who survived their duels. Afterwards, the two bond and agree to escape across the border to live their lives. The next morning, they embark on a hike through a forest. During the hike, it becomes clear that Sarah's Double has poisoned Sarah's water.

Sarah's Double shows up to the duel alone, lying that she is Sarah and stating that the "clone" has fled. After an investigation and a court hearing, a judge declares her to be the original Sarah. However, Sarah's Double is soon left feeling just as depressed and unfulfilled as the original Sarah, carrying her burdens such as the unfiltered Peter and her doting mother (who both know she is the clone). While out driving, Sarah's Double hears a voice message from Sarah's mother containing an implicit threat that the truth could be exposed anytime if the new Sarah ceases to bend to her mother's will. Sarah's Double stops in the middle of a roundabout and cries.

== Cast ==
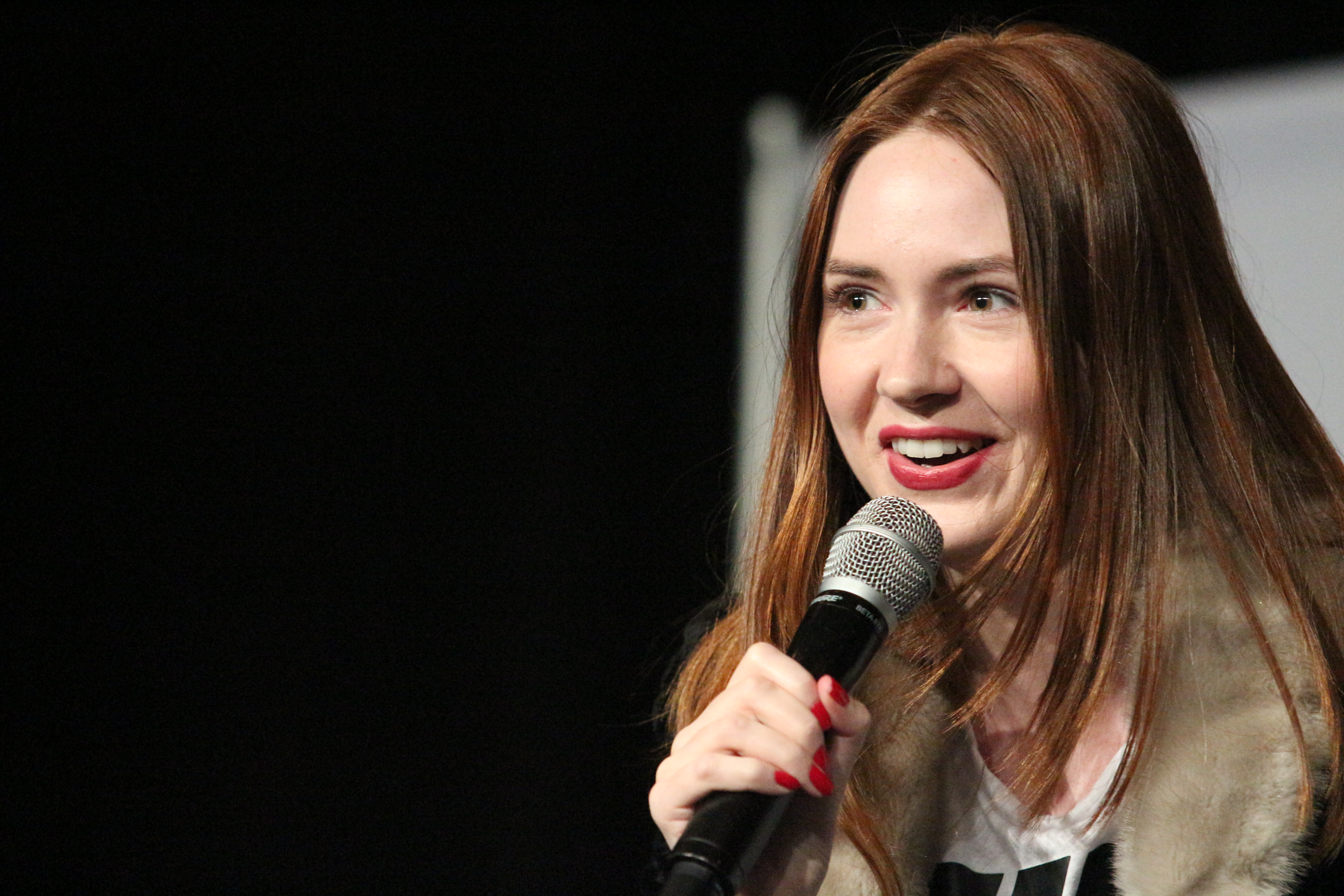
Karen Gillan starred in a dual role as Sarah and Sarah's double in Dual

- Karen Gillan in a dual role as
  - Sarah
  - Sarah's double
- Aaron Paul as Trent
- Theo James as Robert Michaels
- Beulah Koale as Peter
- Maija Paunio as Sarah's mother
- Sanna-June Hyde as Doctor
- Andrei Alén as Facility Tech
- Kris Gummerus as Tom

== Production ==
The film was announced in April 2020, with Karen Gillan, Aaron Paul, Beulah Koale and Jesse Eisenberg cast. However, three months later, Theo James had replaced Eisenberg. Principal photography began in October 2020. The film was shot entirely in Tampere, Finland, and is also co-financed by IPR.VC, the Finnish venture capital company. Due to the COVID-19 pandemic in America, the film crew tried to find a suitable location in Canada and New Zealand, but to no avail, so Finland was chosen as the shooting location for the film. The filming took six weeks, and during that time, Karen Gillan embarked on a heavy fitness workout for her role guided by local coaches.

With the successful filming, the City of Tampere and Film Tampere signed an agreement with XYZ Films for other future productions of the company. The idea of organizing an international short film competition called Generation XYZ for the 2021 Tampere Film Festival arose from the same collaboration.

== Release ==
The film premiered at the 2022 Sundance Film Festival on January 22, 2022. In Finland, where the film was completely shot, it premiered at the Tampere Film Festival on March 12, 2022. RLJE Films acquired the film's distribution rights afterwards. It was released in the United States on April 15, 2022. In April 2022, RLJE Films signed an output deal with AMC+. The film was released on the streaming service on May 20, 2022.

== Reception ==
=== Box office ===
In the United States and Canada, the film earned $118,254 from 157 theaters in its opening weekend.

=== Critical response ===
The film received positive reviews from critics. On the review aggregator website Rotten Tomatoes, 70% of 150 critics' reviews are positive, with an average rating of 6.4/10. The website's consensus reads: "Dual brings writer-director Riley Stearns' signature deadpan style to bear on a smart sci-fi comedy that's well-led by Karen Gillan in double roles." Metacritic, which uses a weighted average, assigned the film a score of 62 out of 100, based on 25 critics, indicating "generally favorable" reviews.

Peter Debruge at Variety wrote, "Dual is in fact a fairly astute comedy. The laughs come not from jokes so much as sharp jabs of truth—wince-inducing insights into the subjects most movies won't touch, like our fear of death, intimacy and being forgotten." IndieWire's David Ehrlich said the film "isn't too big on world-building (lo-fi technology does much of the heavy lifting here, with slide projectors and squelching dial tones co-existing alongside damningly realistic internet porn), but it sure is huge on training sequences. ... Dual reliably gets close to unlocking that layer during its most juvenile moments, as Stearns finds a kind of Beavis and Butt-Head-level poetry in the sort of things that are too immature for other films like this to touch." Writing for The Hollywood Reporter, John DeFore said "the problematic-clone theme is familiar enough that it alone won't keep many viewers engaged for 90 minutes, though Stearns does find an intriguing third-act complication or two. Gillan, who has spent much of her post-Doctor Who decade playing cyborgs, computer avatars and a thinly imagined assassin, has a barely more human role to play here; to the extent that she makes either Sarah worth rooting for, it's an achievement."
