= Event 2 =

Studio album by Deltron 3030
- Released: September 30, 2013
- Recorded: 2004–2013
- Genres: Alternative hip-hop, hip hopera
- Length: 54:10
- Labels: Deltron Partners, Bulk Recordings
- Producer: Dan the Automator

Deltron 3030 chronology
Deltron 3030 (2000)	Event 2 (2013)	Live (2016)

Professional ratings
Aggregate scores
Source	Rating
Metacritic	74/100
Review scores
Source	Rating
AllMusic	4/5 stars
The A.V. Club	(B)
Consequence of Sound	3/5 stars
Inyourspeakers	73/100
Pitchfork	(5.7/10)

Event 2 is the second album by hip-hop supergroup Deltron 3030. The album was released on September 30, 2013. It is the group's first album since their 2000 debut, Deltron 3030 and a narrative sequel. It features guest musical appearances from Damon Albarn, Mike Patton, Emily Wells, Jamie Cullum, Aaron Bruno, Mary Elizabeth Winstead, Black Rob, Zack de la Rocha, and The Lonely Island, as well as spoken-word performances from Joseph Gordon-Levitt, David Cross, Amber Tamblyn, and David Chang.

== Production history ==
Production began in 2004, but was fraught with delays. According to Kid Koala's website, he finished the turntable portions of the album in May 2006. In October 2006 Dan the Automator predicted completion by December 2006, and in November of the same year, Del told IGN that four songs were already written and that "the album's lyrical theme has been basically mapped out." Later, in March 2008, Del told the News-Observer that "Kid Koala and Automator already finished the production. It's done. So, it's just up to me to write [the lyrics]." During an episode of XM Radio's Subsoniq show in April 2008, Del was asked about the progress of the album. He said that he had already written six songs, and that the album should be completed before long.

In an August 2010 interview with Melancholy Native blogger Triassic, Del commented that the album was "just about finished, actually." Del issued several updates in interviews throughout 2011.

On June 12, 2012, it was announced by Dan the Automator that the album was finished with "small touchups" and would likely be released in September 2012.

== Promotion ==
On February 2, 2012, Dogfish Head Brewery updated their blog with information about the Positive Contact box set containing a special edition beer brewed to Dan the Automator's specifications, several recipes from renowned chefs, and a 10" vinyl record with exclusive hip hop dub remixes of four tracks from new album, at that point scheduled to be released in May 2012. The 10" vinyl was later sold separately.

The album's first single was "City Rising From the Ashes," influenced by the story of Osiris.

On September 23, 2013, Event 2 was put on Pitchfork's Advance Streaming service in its entirety, one week before its official release.

== Commercial performance ==
The album debuted at number 41 on the US Billboard 200 chart, with first-week sales of 8,000 copies in the United States.

== Track listing ==
All tracks are written by Dan the Automator, Kid Koala and Del the Funky Homosapien, except where noted.

No.	Title	Length
1.	"Stardate" (featuring Joseph Gordon-Levitt)	1:23
2.	"The Return"	6:40
3.	"Pay The Price"	4:23
4.	"Nobody Can" (featuring Aaron Bruno)	4:35
5.	"Lawnchair Quarterback Part 1" (featuring David Cross and Amber Tamblyn)	0:57
6.	"Melding of the Minds" (featuring Zack De La Rocha)	4:04
7.	"The Agony" (featuring Got a Girl)	3:21
8.	"Back in the Day" (featuring The Lonely Island)	1:28
9.	"Talent Supercedes [sic]" (featuring Black Rob)	3:38
10.	"Look Across the Sky" (featuring Got a Girl)	4:40
11.	"The Future of Food" (featuring David Chang)	1:18
12.	"What is This Loneliness" (featuring Damon Albarn and Casual)	3:51
13.	"My Only Love" (featuring Emily Wells)	3:49
14.	"Lawnchair Quarterback Part 2" (featuring David Cross and Amber Tamblyn)	1:09
15.	"City Rising From The Ashes" (featuring Mike Patton)	3:32
16.	"Do You Remember" (featuring Jamie Cullum)	5:22
