= Dan the Automator Presents 2K7 =

Compilation album by Dan the Automator
- Released: September 19, 2006
- Genre: Hip hop
- Length: 48:56
- Label: Decon
- Producer: Dan the Automator

2K series chronology
2K Sports Mixtape (2006)	Dan the Automator Presents 2K7 (2006)	2K8: The Tracks (2007)

Dan the Automator chronology
Wanna Buy a Monkey? (2002)	Dan the Automator Presents 2K7 (2006)

Dan the Automator Presents 2K7 is a soundtrack album to the NBA 2K7 video game. It was released on Decon in 2006. Compiled by Dan the Automator, it features guest appearances from Ghostface, E-40, Slim Thug, Lupe Fiasco, Mos Def, Rhymefest, and members of Dilated Peoples and Jurassic 5. An instrumental version of the album was released afterwards.

== Critical reception ==
Professional ratings
Review scores
Source	Rating
AllHipHop	favorable
AllMusic	4/5 stars
HipHopDX	3/5 stars
Okayplayer	3.5/5 stars
PopMatters	4/10 stars
RapReviews.com	7/10

Marisa Brown of AllMusic gave the album 4 out of 5 stars, calling it "a pretty nice assortment of styles and sounds that ... flows really well thanks to Dan's consistently good and interesting production." Dan Raper of PopMatters gave the album 4 out of 10 stars, writing, "it makes us doubt Dan the Automator still has what it takes to produce a hip-hop compilation that is at all compelling."

== Track listing ==
No.	Title	Length
1.	"Intro"	1:01
2.	"I Love This Game" (featuring Slim Thug)	4:05
3.	"Bang the Ball" (featuring Rhymefest)	3:10
4.	"Don't Hate the Player" (featuring Hieroglyphics)	4:00
5.	"Ball Till You Fall" (featuring Fabolous)	4:40
6.	"Champions" (featuring Aceyalone and Rakaa)	3:59
7.	"Baller Blockin'" (featuring E-40 and San Quinn)	3:37
8.	"2K007" (featuring Ghostface and A.G.)	3:49
9.	"Catch Me" (featuring Lupe Fiasco and Evidence)	3:36
10.	"Here Comes the Champ" (featuring Mos Def and Anwar Superstar)	4:22
11.	"Anchor Man" (featuring Chali 2na)	4:21
12.	"Lyrics to Go (Dan the Automator Remix)" (featuring A Tribe Called Quest)	4:45
13.	"Fade Away" (featuring Zion I)	3:37
Total length:		48:56

== Charts ==
Chart	Peak position
US Top Dance/Electronic Albums (Billboard)	16
