= Bombay the Hard Way: Guns, Cars and Sitars =

Remix album by Kalyanji–Anandji
- Released: 1998
- Length: 48:17
- Label: Motel
- Producer: Dan the Automator

Kalyanji–Anandji chronology
| Bombay the Hard Way: Guns, Cars and Sitars (1998) | Bombay 2: Electric Vindaloo (2001) |

Bombay the Hard Way: Guns, Cars and Sitars is a remix album which consists of tracks from 1970s Bollywood composer duo Kalyanji–Anandji (Kalyanji Virji Shah and Anandji Virji Shah) remixed by Dan the Automator. It was released on Motel Records in 1998. The album features music from films scored by the duo, such as Don, Purab Aur Pachhim, Qurbani, and Karmayogi.

A sequel album titled Bombay 2: Electric Vindaloo, without Automator's involvement, was released in 2001, focusing on '80s Bollywood music.

== Production ==
The album is also heavily credited to American producer DJ Shadow, but it is stated on his website: "The marketing campaign for this Dan the Automator remix project implied massive DJ Shadow involvement, which was far from the case; Shadow played drums for 30 minutes one day in the studio, elements of which were resampled and applied to various tracks. Shadow was dismayed by the record company's blatant exploitation of his name, and distanced himself from the project."

== Critical reception ==
Professional ratings
Review scores
| Source | Rating |
|---|---|
| AllMusic | 4.5/5 stars |
| Robert Christgau | (2-star Honorable Mention) |
| Entertainment Weekly | B+ |

AllMusic wrote: "This is truly groovy, funky, tripped-out music from the movie capitol of the world, and showcases how the Americans and the Italians may have invented the noir and cheap thrill movie soundtrack, but the Indians took it to a whole different level."

== Track listing ==
1. "Bombay 405 Miles"
2. "The Good, The Bad, and the Chutney"
3. "My Guru"
4. "Ganges a Go-Go"
5. "The Great Gambler"
6. "Professor Pyarelal"
7. "Fists of Curry"
8. "Punjabis, Pimps and Players"
9. "Inspector Jay from Delhi"
10. "Satchidananda"
11. "Theme from Don"
12. "Fear of a Brown Planet"
13. "Uptown Bollywood Nights"
14. "Kundan's Hideout"
15. "Swami Safari"

== Personnel ==
Credits adapted from liner notes.

- Kalyanji–Anandji – composition, arrangement, conducting
- Dan the Automator – production
- DJ Josh Davis – additional drum breaks
- Nana Simopoulos – additional sitar
- Kurt Ralske – editing, additional engineering
- Howie Weinberg – mastering
- Adrian Milan – executive production, art direction
- Michael Berger – photography
- Kary Morris – artwork
- Michael de Corbiac – artwork
