= Riley Stearns =

American filmmaker (born 1986)

- Born: June 29, 1986 (age 39); Austin, Texas, U.S.
- Occupation: Filmmaker
- Years active: 2008–present
- Spouse: Mary Elizabeth Winstead (m. 2010; div. 2017)

Riley Stearns (born June 29, 1986) is an American filmmaker who has directed three feature films: Faults (2014), The Art of Self-Defense (2019), and Dual (2022).

== Early life ==
Stearns was born on June 29, 1986, in Austin, Texas, and grew up in Pflugerville, Texas. He attended University of Texas at Austin, but dropped out after being turned down by the film program.

== Career ==
Initially wanting to be a musician, Stearns became involved in filmmaking after visiting various movie sets and after being advised on being a screenwriter by Final Destination 3 director James Wong.

Stearns worked as a writer for Cartoon Network's Tower Prep, and for the television series My Own Worst Enemy and Bionic Woman. His short film The Cub became his first film to be premiered at the 2013 Sundance Film Festival, and also to be featured by Vice Media.

He released his feature debut Faults in 2014. It was later chosen to be part of the Best Unproduced Scripts Black List of 2013. Stearns wrote and directed a second feature, The Art of Self-Defense, which was released in 2019. In 2022, he released his third feature film Dual.

In 2025, he directed the music video for the song "Radioactive Dreams", the first single from the Chat Pile and Hayden Pedigo collaborative album In The Earth Again.

== Personal life ==
In 2010, he married actress Mary Elizabeth Winstead, whom he met during an ocean cruise in 2002. She starred in his first two short films, before starring in his feature film debut, Faults in 2014.

The couple separated in 2017, and divorced later that year.

Stearns is a black belt in Brazilian Jiu-Jitsu and won a bronze medal at the 2022 ADCC Open in the 70kg Masters Pro division.

== Filmography ==
Short film

Year	Title	Director	Writer	Producer
2011	Magnificat	Yes	Yes	No
2012	Casque	Yes	Yes	Yes
2013	The Cub	Yes	Yes	Yes

Feature film

Year	Title	Director	Writer	Producer
2014	Faults	Yes	Yes	No
2019	The Art of Self-Defense	Yes	Yes	No
2022	Dual	Yes	Yes	Yes
