= I Love You but I Must Drive Off This Cliff Now =

Studio album by Got a Girl
- Released: July 22, 2014
- Recorded: 2012–2013
- Genres: French pop, trip hop, Indie pop
- Length: 46:22
- Label: Bulk Recordings
- Producer: Dan the Automator

Singles from I Love You but I Must Drive Off This Cliff Now
- 1. "Did We Live Too Fast" Released: June 3, 2014; 2. "There's a Revolution" Released: July 7, 2014

I Love You but I Must Drive Off This Cliff Now is the first studio album by American musical duo Got a Girl. It was released on Bulk Recordings on July 22, 2014. It peaked at number 27 on Billboard's Heatseekers Albums chart.

== Production ==
The duo revealed that the album would feature heavy influences of French pop music, which were a shared interest between the two.

In an interview with Complex, Winstead also details the inspiration behind the album—"French '60s pop—Jane Birkin, and stuff like that. It's kind of married with Dan's sensibility, which is his beats and a little bit of that low-key hip-hop vibe. So it makes for something that's very unique; it's very lounge-y and light. It's got a little bit of a French quality."

== Release ==
In May 2013, the official promo track "You and Me" was released. It was promoted as the first single from their upcoming album, but the track was ultimately not included in the album.

On May 31, Got a Girl also recorded the song "I'm Down" from Beck's music sheet album Song Reader. The recording was released on YouTube. On July 8, 2014, the final track listing for the album was released, and Got a Girl's cover of the song was not selected to be included in the album.

Initially, Got a Girl's debut album was reported to be set for release in January 2014 via EMI, but was bumped to July 2014.

In June 2014, Spin revealed that the album, titled I Love You but I Must Drive Off this Cliff Now, will be released on July 22 via Bulk Recordings. The album's full track list is also revealed on AllMusic. The first single, "Did We Live Too Fast", premiered on June 3. The music video, directed by Hope Larson, premiered online on June 16.

The second single, "There's a Revolution", was released on July 8.

== Critical reception ==
Professional ratings
Aggregate scores
Source	Rating
Metacritic	66/100
Review scores
Source	Rating
ABC News	4/5 stars
AllMusic	3.5/5 stars
The Digital Fix	8/10
London Evening Standard	4/5 stars
NME	7/10
PopMatters	7/10
Renowned for Sound	4/5 stars
Spectrum Culture	3.75 stars on a 5 point scale
Under the Radar	3/10

At Metacritic, which assigns a weighted average score out of 100 to reviews from mainstream critics, the album received an average score of 66% based on 5 reviews, indicating "generally favorable reviews".

== Track listing ==
All lyrics are written by Mary Elizabeth Winstead; all music is composed by Dan the Automator.

No.	Title	Length
1.	"Did We Live Too Fast"	3:50
2.	"I'll Never Hold You Back"	4:25
3.	"Close to You"	4:35
4.	"Everywhere I Go"	4:34
5.	"Last Stop"	3:57
6.	"There's a Revolution"	3:31
7.	"Things Will Never Be the Same"	3:52
8.	"Put Your Head Down (feat. Mike Patton)"	3:59
9.	"Friday Night"	3:22
10.	"La La La"	4:22
11.	"Da Da Da"	2:09
12.	"Heavenly"	3:58
Total length:		46:22

== Charts ==
Chart	Peak position
US Heatseekers Albums (Billboard)	27
