= Mary Elizabeth Winstead =

American actress (born 1984)

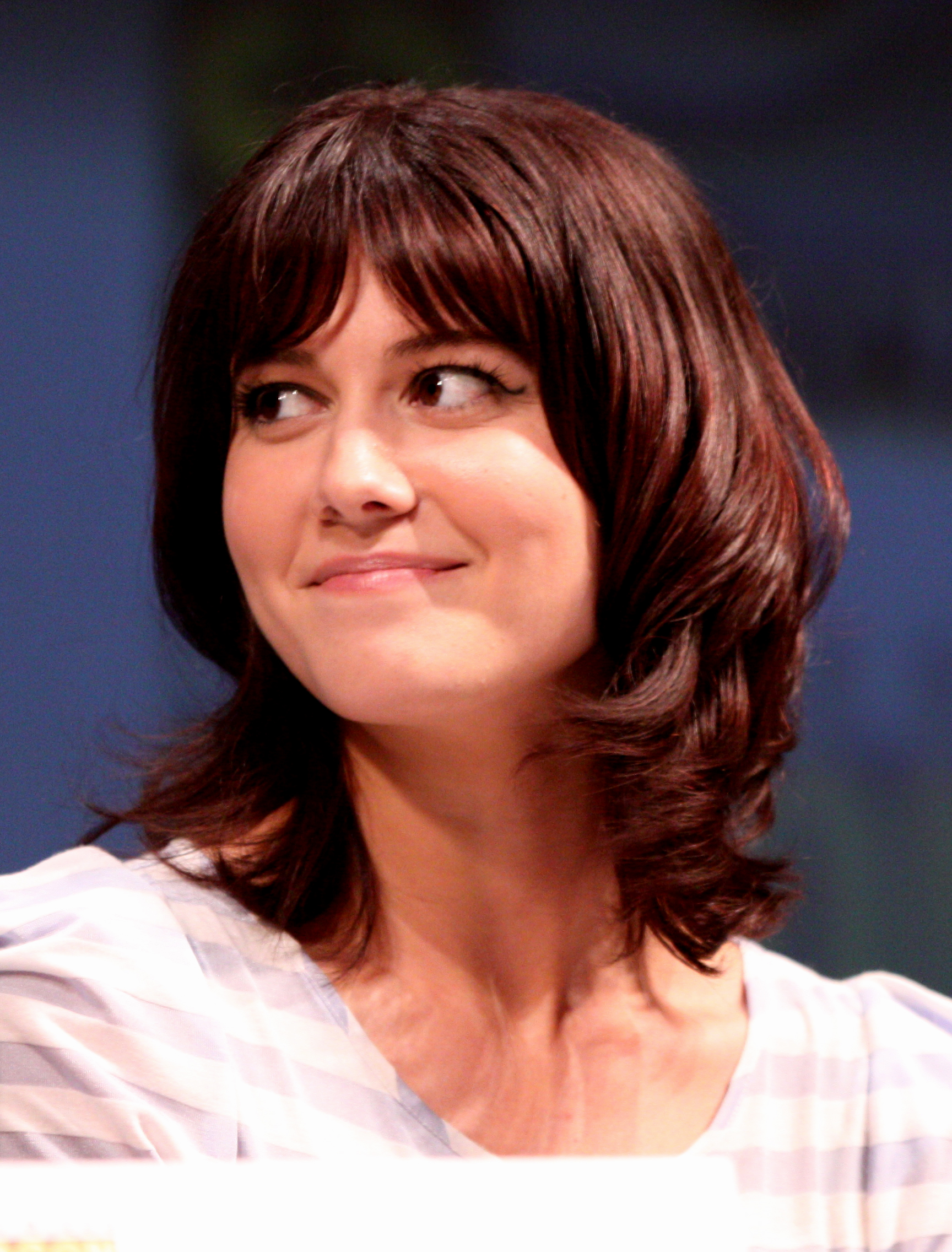
- Winstead at the 2010 San Diego Comic Con
- Born: November 28, 1984 (age 41); Rocky Mount, North Carolina, U.S.
- Occupations: Actress; singer
- Years active: 1997–present
- Spouses: Riley Stearns (m. 2010; div. 2017) Ewan McGregor (m. 2022)
- Children: 1

Mary Elizabeth Winstead (born November 28, 1984) is an American actress and singer. Her first major role was that of Jessica Bennett on the NBC soap opera Passions (1999–2000). She came to wider attention for her roles in the horror series Wolf Lake (2001–2002), the horror films Final Destination 3 (2006) and Death Proof (2007), and the slasher film Black Christmas (2006); by the end of the 2000s she had gained a reputation as a scream queen.

Further success came with her roles as Lucy McClane in Live Free or Die Hard (2007) and A Good Day to Die Hard (2013) and Ramona Flowers in Scott Pilgrim vs. the World (2010). Her critically acclaimed performance as an alcoholic struggling with sobriety in the drama Smashed (2012) was followed by a series of roles in other independent films, including The Beauty Inside (2012), The Spectacular Now (2013), Faults (2014), Alex of Venice (2014), and Swiss Army Man (2016). Winstead had further horror film roles in The Thing (2011), Abraham Lincoln: Vampire Hunter (2012), and 10 Cloverfield Lane (2016). Since 2013, Winstead has performed as music duo Got a Girl with Dan the Automator.

Winstead returned to television with the drama series The Returned (2015), the comedy series BrainDead (2016), the medical drama series Mercy Street (2016–2017), and the third season of the crime drama Fargo (2017). Her other roles include the comedy-drama All About Nina (2018), the action film Gemini Man (2019), the Huntress in Birds of Prey (2020), and Hera Syndulla in the Star Wars series Ahsoka (2023–2027).

== Early life ==
Winstead was born on November 28, 1984, in Rocky Mount, North Carolina. Her parents are Betty Lou (née Knight) and James Ronald Winstead. She is the youngest of their five children. Her grandfather, Ambler William Winstead, was a cousin of actress Ava Gardner. When she was five years old, her family moved to Sandy, Utah, a suburb of Salt Lake City. In Sandy, she attended Peruvian Park Elementary and took advanced classes. She studied dance in a Joffrey Ballet summer program in Chicago, and sang in the International Children's Choir. During her youth, she hoped to pursue a career as a ballerina and appeared in local ballet productions. As she entered her teens, she was forced to quit ballet due to her height. She later said, "I realized pretty early on that I was already too tall by the time I was 13... You know, your body has to stay that way for your entire life, and it's pretty hard on your muscles and your bones." Realizing a dance career was unlikely, she turned to acting. As she was still a teenager at the time, this required her to be homeschooled through most of high school.

== Career ==
=== Acting ===
==== 1997–2004 ====
Winstead appeared in a production of Joseph and the Amazing Technicolor Dreamcoat starring Donny Osmond. After her brief performance in that show, Winstead began making appearances in various television series and earned guest roles in Touched by an Angel and Promised Land. She gained her first major role as Jessica Bennett in the NBC soap opera Passions, from 1999 to 2000. She left to pursue other interests, later stating, "I really had one of the smallest roles on Passions, so I didn't get too involved... I was able to leave pretty easily". Winstead's next significant television role was in the short-lived CBS drama series Wolf Lake (2001–02), as the daughter of Tim Matheson's character. The series was canceled after ten episodes. In 2004, Winstead played a supporting role in MTV's made-for-television film Monster Island. She was offered a role in the film A Cinderella Story, but turned it down as she had just graduated from school and was going on a cruise with friends (where she met Riley Stearns, her future husband).

==== 2005–2011 ====
Following a minor role in the indie comedy Checking Out (2005), she took on a larger role as a school senior turned the main antagonist in the Walt Disney Pictures film Sky High, about an airborne school for teenage superheroes. Winstead said of her role, "I bounced around. I was either the hero of the sidekicks or the sidekick to the heroes." The film was released on July 29, 2005, receiving favorable reviews, and budgeted at US$35 million, it grossed US$63.9 million domestically.

Winstead then began working with filmmakers James Wong and Glen Morgan, previously known for their contributions to The X-Files. She starred in the 2006 horror movie Final Destination 3 (which Wong directed and Morgan produced) as lead character Wendy Christensen, the "beleaguered heroine who experiences the premonition" that sets the story in motion. The production was a commercial success, but received a mixed response from critics. Winstead's performance fared positively with reviewers; James Berardinelli stated she "does as competent a job as one could expect in these dire circumstances," while Felix Gonzalez, Jr found her "likeable" in her role. Winstead would collaborate again with Morgan and Wong later that year, in the slasher film Black Christmas. The movie, a loose remake of the 1974 film of the same name, follows a group of sorority sisters who are stalked and murdered by the house's former inhabitants during a winter storm. It received poor reviews, but earned her a nomination for Scream Queen at the 2007 Scream Awards. Winstead got a chance to lampoon horror scream queens when Tonight Show host Jay Leno, unaware of who she was, knocked on her front door and included her in a comedy segment spoofing horror films.

She appeared in Emilio Estevez's Bobby, a 2006 film depicting the last hours of Robert F. Kennedy. Winstead became interested in Bobby after learning that Anthony Hopkins would appear in the film. A moderate box office success in selected theaters, Bobby received mixed reviews with many criticisms directed at the film's script. The film's cast was nominated for the Screen Actors Guild Award for Best Cast in a Motion Picture, but won the Hollywood Film Festival Award for Best Ensemble Cast.

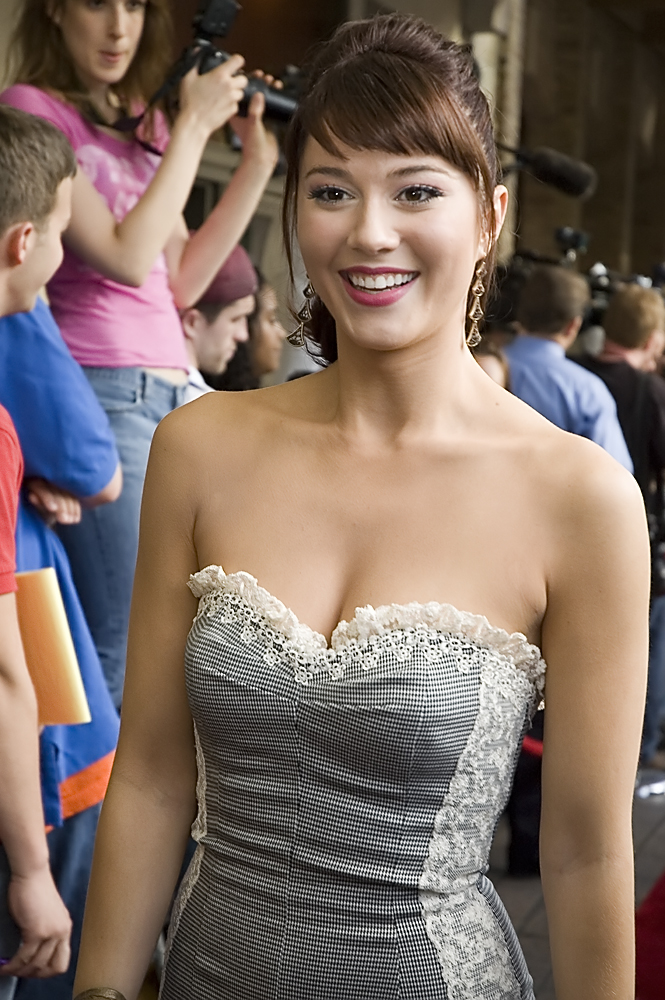
Winstead at the premiere of Grindhouse in Austin, Texas, March 2007

In 2007, Winstead appeared in a pair of high-profile event films. Quentin Tarantino cast her as a well-intentioned but vapid and naïve actress in Death Proof, his high-speed segment of the double–feature exploitation horror Grindhouse. She appeared alongside Rosario Dawson, Tracie Thoms, Zoë Bell, and Kurt Russell in the movie's second part, which followed a psychopathic stunt man, played by Russell, stalking and murdering young women. It is the second film to feature Winstead with Russell (after Sky High), although she only filmed scenes with Dawson, Thoms, and Bell. The production under-performed commercially but attracted significant media buzz and critical acclaim, Variety magazine noted that Death Proof "proves its worth as a stand-alone feature" and found Winstead's "emergence" to be "one agreeable plus [to the movie]". Her next film appearance of the year was opposite Bruce Willis in Live Free or Die Hard, portraying John McClane's estranged daughter, Lucy. The movie grossed US$383.5 million and was highly acclaimed.

She starred in a lead role in Make It Happen, a dance film. The film went straight to DVD in the United States, and fared poorly in its UK release. Nevertheless, it proved a delight for Winstead, who once dreamed of being a dancer. Critics agreed that she was the film's best asset. Reviewer Mike Martin wrote, "Winstead infuses every moment with an amazing amount of charm". Matthew Turner of ViewLondon wrote, "[Winstead] compensates for the generally poor direction."

Winstead co-starred opposite Michael Cera in the film Scott Pilgrim vs. the World, an adaptation of the comic-book Scott Pilgrim, under the direction of Edgar Wright. Her role was Ramona Flowers, a mysterious delivery girl and Scott's love interest. Winstead went through fight training for two months and performed most of her own stunts. Filming occurred from March to August 2009, and the film was released in late 2010, to critical acclaim but poor box office returns. Winstead's performance was well received generally, and earned her a Teen Choice Awards nomination for Choice Actress Action.

Winstead was cast as the lead female in the 2011 prequel film to 1982's The Thing, which followed a group of scientists who discover an alien buried deep in the ice of Antarctica, realizing too late that it is still alive. Winstead portrayed paleontologist Dr. Kate Lloyd, a character she based on her sister, a neurologist. The production received a U.S. theatrical release on October 14, 2011, garnering a mixed critical reception and little commercial interest. Critics singled out Winstead for praise in her performance, with Las Vegas Weekly asserting that she "makes for an appealing protagonist, and Kate is portrayed as competent without being thrust into some unlikely action-hero role".

==== 2012–2014 ====
Winstead appeared opposite Aaron Paul in Smashed, an independent drama directed by James Ponsoldt about a married alcoholic couple (Paul and Winstead) whose relationship is put to test when the wife decides to get sober. She said that the film was shot in 19 days. Screened during the 2012 Sundance Film Festival, Winstead's performance earned her rave reviews, with JoBlo.com calling it: "the type of performance that could be Award-worthy if given the right kind of build-up by whichever studio picks it up". The film was released theatrically on October 12, 2012, and saw Winstead snagging the Dallas International Film Festival Award for Best Actress. During a promotional interview for the movie with website Collider, she expressed pride in working on an independent project: "It's something I've been trying to do for years and years [...] It's almost like my first movie in a weird way, cause it's my first movie in this world, which is a world I've been trying to break into. [I've wanted] to be around filmmakers that are trying new things and not part of the system, so to speak, and they're doing things on their own terms."

Winstead played the role of Mary Todd Lincoln opposite Benjamin Walker in Abraham Lincoln: Vampire Hunter. The film, also released in 2012, received a mixed critical response while it flopped at the box office. Nevertheless, critics praised Winstead's performance. The San Jose Mercury News called Winstead "a standout", and the Illinois Times film critic wrote, "Winstead humanizes Mary [Todd Lincoln] by giving her a fiery wit and sense of resolve in the face of considerable adversity". Winstead was commended for scenes opposite Benjamin Walker, with Little White Lies writing that they shared: "a sweet chemistry that gives their handful of scenes an endearing warmth". In 2012, Winstead and Topher Grace appeared in The Beauty Inside, an "interactive social film". It was broken into six filmed episodes interspersed with interactive storytelling, all on Alex (the main character)'s Facebook timeline. He awakes each day with a different appearance; Winstead appeared as Leah, Alex's love interest. The web series served as an advertising campaign for Intel and Toshiba; it ran from August 16 through September 20, 2012.

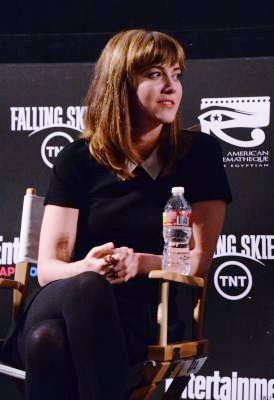
Winstead at the Entertainment Weekly CapeTown Film Festival

Winstead was also cast in Roman Coppola's A Glimpse Inside the Mind of Charles Swan III (2013), as Kate, "the best friend of [Charlie Sheen's] girlfriend who just broke up with him. She is not so supportive of their relationship." The film reunited her with Jason Schwartzman and Aubrey Plaza, her collaborators on Scott Pilgrim vs. the World. Winstead next co-starred with Adam Scott, Richard Jenkins, Jane Lynch, Jessica Alba, Amy Poehler, and Catherine O'Hara in A.C.O.D. (2013), portraying Lauren Stinger, the "long-time girlfriend of Carter (Scott) and the rock in his increasingly chaotic life." Although the film received mixed reviews, Winstead's acting was singled out by the Washington Post: "Winstead brings surprising depth to a small role, in which she has little to do except wait for her boyfriend to grow up, or to at least let go of his cynicism about love." Screen Rant critic Ben Kendrick wrote: "[Winstead] and [Alba] also deliver in their contributions – though both of their characters are mainly designed to be mirrors for Carter to examine his own life and choices." A Glimpse Inside the Mind of Charles Swan III and A.C.O.D. both received a limited theatrical run in North America.

Winstead collaborated again with James Ponsoldt in The Spectacular Now (2013) as Holly, the sister of Miles Teller's lead character. She appeared with Brie Larson, her co-star in Scott Pilgrim vs. the World, and with Shailene Woodley, Kyle Chandler, and Bob Odenkirk. The film garnered critical acclaim and was an arthouse success. Next, Winstead briefly reprised her role in the film A Good Day to Die Hard (also 2013), shooting her scenes in only one day. Winstead stated in an interview with Yahoo! that she was not expecting another sequel but "[had fun reprising] the father-daughter rapport." Winstead's scene was only available in the theatrical version, and was cut from the unrated version.

In 2014, Winstead was given the title role in Alex of Venice, directed by Chris Messina and penned by Jessica Goldberg. She played "an environmental lawyer who is left to raise her 12-year-old son alone after her husband bolts." Premiering at the 57th San Francisco International Film Festival, reviews for the film were mostly positive, with many critics praising Winstead's part in it; Variety magazine called her performance "extraordinary", saying the film: "belongs to Winstead, whose minor-key thesping proves as compelling as her heavy lifting in Smashed. Alex's gradual metamorphosis into a richer, more fully realized young woman is accomplished in hundreds of tiny emotional brushstrokes, flitting across her girl-next-door wholesomeness in ever-shifting patterns". Website Twitch Film wrote:

[Winstead] has matured from her early roles in horror films, to more impressive fare such as Smashed. She has grace, courage, knows how to move the audience and the camera loves her. While her resume up 'til now is a mix of blockbusters (Final Destination 3, Live Free or Die Hard) and indie favorites (Scott Pilgrim vs. the World), this will change as she continues to grow into her profoundly blossoming career. This is an actress ready to do great things. As Alex, she always wears a look of determination, even when she's exhausted and losing the new battles thrown at her: learning how to be alone, taking care of her family and keeping the job she's worked her entire life for. Alex is a tender soul but does her damnedest to keep it together. It's an admirable trait not many can do, let alone be challenged with.

In 2014, Winstead starred in Stearns' debut feature film Faults. Winstead and co-star Leland Orser were praised for their performances, with Film School Rejects calling it an "exceptional performance" and Indiewire saying "[Winstead's] inscrutable expression epitomizes this unique movie's enigmatic appeal", and even "ranks among her best". Winstead was next cast alongside Jeremy Renner and Rosemarie DeWitt in Kill the Messenger. The thriller tells the true story of investigative journalist Gary Webb. Winstead portrayed Dawn Garcia, Webb's editor at the San Jose Mercury News. It received a limited theatrical release on October 10, 2014, to favorable reviews but little commercial interest.

==== 2015–present ====
By January 2015, Winstead had been already cast as a series regular on A&E's U.S. remake of the French drama series The Returned, with Sandrine Holt and Agnes Bruckner. The adapted show followed residents in a small town whose lives are disrupted when people who have been dead for many years begin reappearing. It premiered on March 9, 2015, for a 10-episode run, to mostly critical acclaim. The series was cancelled after its first season though, due to low ratings. Also in 2015, she also made a guest-appearance on the August 6 episode of IFC's Comedy Bang! Bang! ("Mary Elizabeth Winstead Wears an A-Line Skirt and Pointy Black Boots").

Winstead next portrayed the leading role of Mary Phinney in PBS' historical drama Mercy Street. The six-part series, about two volunteer nurses on opposing sides of the Civil War, premiered on-demand on January 14, 2016, and made its broadcast debut three days later, on January 17. It rated favorably with reviewers, who also showed praise of Winstead's performance; Variety magazine described her as the "smart, capable center around which Mercy Street pivots" and therefore noted that she was "so good that it's hard not to wish the show had pared down the sheer number of storylines it attempts to service in its six installments". The show was renewed for a second season, which premiered on January 22, 2017, and was cancelled after its finale aired.

Winstead headlined the psychological thriller 10 Cloverfield Lane, appearing as Michelle, a woman held in a shelter with two men, who claim the outside world is affected by a widespread chemical attack. The film, directed by Dan Trachtenberg, was released on March 11, 2016, to a widely positive reception from critics who, according to website Rotten Tomatoes, agreed that the movie "makes the most of its confined setting and outstanding cast". Daily Express found Winstead "sympathetic" and remarked that she "creates a character who is smart and resourceful", while writer James Berardinelli called her a "good choice" to play the heroine as she is "strong yet feminine". 10 Cloverfield Lane had the highest debut at the box office for Winstead in a leading role, with over US$24 million grossed on its opening weekend; it went on to gross US$72 million in North America and US$110.2 million worldwide.

Winstead appeared in Swiss Army Man, an independent comedy-drama directed by Daniel Kwan and Daniel Scheinert. The film, co-starring Daniel Radcliffe and Paul Dano, follows a hopeless man stranded on an island who befriends an apparent dead body as he tries to get back home. It premiered at the 2016 Sundance Film Festival and was released in selected theaters on June 24, to a positive reception. Winstead also had a role in John Krasinski's small-scale dramedy The Hollars, opposite Richard Jenkins, Anna Kendrick, Mary Kay Place, and Margo Martindale. She played the ex-girlfriend of Krasinski's struggling New York City graphic novelist, who returns to his hometown after learning his mother has fallen ill. Like Swiss Army Man, the production was screened at Sundance and received a limited U.S. theatrical release in August 2016.

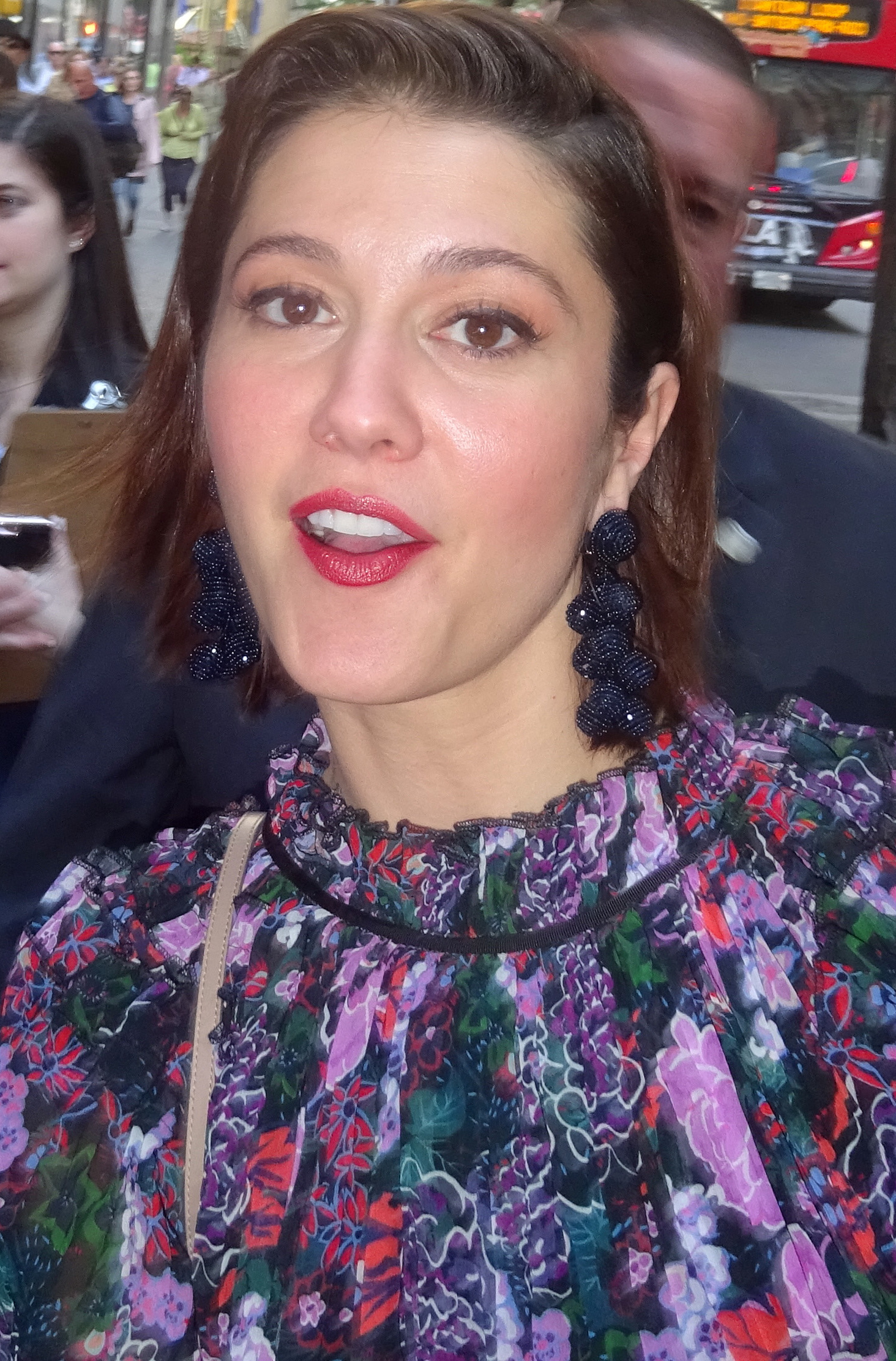
Winstead in 2017

Winstead appeared in CBS' political comic thriller BrainDead, as leading character Laurel, "the daughter of a Democratic political dynasty who left Washington, D.C. to become a documentary filmmaker, but is pulled back into the family business when her brother needs political help". The series received mildly positive reviews by critics, with New York Magazine calling Winstead's casting the "smartest decision the makers made", and The A.V. Club said that she "makes an eminently watchable, formidable heroine". Despite a largely positive critical response, the series debuted to lackluster ratings and after the airing of its 13-episode first season, CBS announced its cancellation.

Winstead starred opposite Ewan McGregor in the third season of Fargo as Nikki Swango, "a crafty and alluring recent parolee with a passion for competitive bridge playing with a plan, focused on always being at least one move ahead of her opponents". The season is set around December 2010 in Minnesota and follows the lives of McGregor and Winstead's criminal couple roles; it premiered on April 19, 2017, to positive reviews. In an interview with Variety, Winstead spoke of the character, "I'd never played a character like this. Once I was on set and doing it, it was so easy but it took all the elements coming together for me to feel confident and comfortable."

In October 2017, Deadline reported that Winstead would be starring as lead in the semi-autographical dark comedy All About Nina, opposite Common. The film screened at the Tribeca Film Festival in April 2018 and won Winstead rave reviews, with The Hollywood Reporter calling it "yet another impressive performance by Mary Elizabeth Winstead" and earning her a nomination for Bravest Performance at the Alliance of Women Film Journalists.

In December 2017, it was reported that Winstead would co-star in The Parts You Lose; the romantic thriller saw her reuniting with her Smashed co-star, Aaron Paul. In January 2018, it was reported that Winstead was cast as female lead opposite Will Smith in Gemini Man. The film, directed by Ang Lee, was released in the United States on October 11, 2019, by Paramount Pictures. In late-September 2018, Winstead was announced to play Huntress in Warner Bros.' DC Comics film Birds of Prey (And the Fantabulous Emancipation of One Harley Quinn). Directed by Cathy Yan, and starring Margot Robbie, who reprised her role as Harley Quinn, the film was released in February 2020.

In February 2019, it was revealed that Winstead would guest star in the Netflix adult-oriented animated anthology series Love, Death & Robots. The series saw her reuniting with The Beauty Inside co-star Topher Grace and was released on March 15.

In April 2019, Winstead joined the cast of Netflix action film Kate as the titular lead character. The film was released in September 2021 to lukewarm reviews, but Winstead was praised for her performance.

In January 2022, Winstead was added to the cast of Disney+ Star Wars series Ahsoka. She is also set to co-star with Xochitl Gomez in Jonathan and Josh Baker's second feature film Ursa Major, based on an original script by Patrick Somerville, for XYZ Films.

=== Singing ===
Winstead has expressed her interest in singing, but initially did not plan on pursuing it as a career. "I wasn't ever really going to be a singer, but it's just something I've always loved." For her part in 2007's Death Proof, Tarantino had Winstead sing an a cappella cover of The Shirelles' hit recording "Baby It's You". She was asked without warning to perform the song and the cast were reportedly "gob-smacked" by her singing. Winstead and music producer Thai Long Ly eventually co-wrote a song, called "Warmth of Him". Although first rumored to be a pre-release single, Winstead confirmed that she was just exploring her interest and did not plan at the time on releasing any music albums.

==== Got a Girl ====
In an interview with Complex magazine for the June/July 2012 issue, Winstead revealed she was working with Dan the Automator and was indeed planning on releasing a music album. The duo formed the band Got a Girl the following year, and released their demo "You & Me" on May 21, 2013. The album, titled I Love You but I Must Drive Off This Cliff Now, was released on July 22, 2014, via Bulk Recordings. The first single, "Did We Live Too Fast" premiered on June 3, and its music video, directed by Hope Larson, premiered online on June 16. The album features heavy influences of French pop music, with Winstead detailing that the inspiration behind the project came from "French '60s pop—Jane Birkin, and stuff like that. It's kind of married with Dan's sensibility, which is his beats and a little bit of that low-key hip-hop vibe. So it makes for something that's very unique; it's very lounge-y and light. It's got a little bit of a French quality." All lyrics were written by Winstead while all music was composed by Dan the Automator.

==== Guest appearances ====
Winstead was also featured on the songs "The Agony" and "Look Across The Sky" on Deltron 3030's second studio album Event 2, released on September 30, 2013.

In November 2016, Honus Honus from experimental band Man Man released a song on SoundCloud, "Santa Monica," that features Winstead. In December 2016, Portugal. The Man released the single and video for "Noise Pollution (Version A, Vocal Up Mix 1.3)" from their album Woodstock, featuring Winstead and Zoe Manville.

== Personal life ==
In 2010, Winstead married filmmaker Riley Stearns, whom she had met while they were both eighteen, in 2002, on an ocean cruise. She starred in and produced Stearns's debut feature film, Faults, in 2014. She announced their separation in May 2017 and their divorce was finalized later that year.

It was reported in October 2017 that she was in a relationship with Scottish actor Ewan McGregor, whom she had met on the set of the third season of the Fargo television series. Their son was born on June 27, 2021. Winstead and McGregor married in April 2022.

== Filmography ==
=== Films ===
Year	Title	Role	Notes	Ref.
2005	The Ring Two	young Evelyn Borden (née Osorio)	Unrated version only	
2005	Checking Out	Lisa Apple		
2005	Sky High	Gwen Grayson / Royal Pain / Sue "Tenny" Tennyson		
2006	Final Destination 3	Wendy Christensen		
2006	Bobby	Susan Taylor		
2006	Black Christmas	Heather Fitzgerald		
2006	Factory Girl	Ingrid Superstar		
2007	Death Proof	Lee Montgomery		
2007	Live Free or Die Hard	Lucy Gennero-McClane		
2008	Make It Happen	Lauryn Kirk		
2010	Scott Pilgrim vs. the World	Ramona Flowers		
2011	The Thing	Dr. Kate Lloyd		
2012	Smashed	Kate Hannah		
2012	Abraham Lincoln: Vampire Hunter	Mary Todd Lincoln		
2013	A Glimpse Inside the Mind of Charles Swan III	Kate		
2013	The Spectacular Now	Holly Keely		
2013	A.C.O.D.	Lauren Stinger		
2013	A Good Day to Die Hard	Lucy Gennero-McClane	Theatrical version only	
2014	Faults	Claire	Also producer	
2014	Alex of Venice	Alex Vedder		
2014	Kill the Messenger	Anna Simons		
2016	Swiss Army Man	Sarah Johnson		
2016	The Hollars	Gwen		
2016	10 Cloverfield Lane	Michelle		
2018	All About Nina	Nina Geld		
2019	Gemini Man	Danielle "Danny" Zakarewski		
2019	The Parts You Lose	Gail		
2020	Birds of Prey	Helena Bertinelli / The Huntress		
2021	Kate	Kate		
2024	Rich Flu	Laura Palmer		
2025	The Hand That Rocks the Cradle	Caitlin Morales / Jennifer		

=== Television ===
Year	Title	Role	Notes	Ref.
1997	Touched by an Angel	Kristy	Episode: "A Delicate Balance"	
1998	Promised Land	Chloe	Episodes: "Recycled", "Denver: Welcome Home"	
1999–2000	Passions	Jessica Bennett	Regular role; 89 episodes	
1999	The Long Road Home	Annie Jacobs	Television film	
2001–2002	Wolf Lake	Sophia Donner	Main role	
2004	Tru Calling	Bridget Elkins	Episode: "Closure"	
2004	Monster Island	Madison	Television film	
2012	The Beauty Inside	Leah	Web series	
2015	Exposed	Anna Loach	Pilot	
2015	Quarry	Joni	Unsold TV pilot	
2015	The Returned	Rowan Blackshaw	Main role	
2015	Comedy Bang! Bang!	Herself	Episode: "Mary Elizabeth Winstead Wears an A-Line Skirt..."	
2016	Brad Neely's Harg Nallin Sclopio Peepio	Guest Star (voice)	Episode: "For Streep"	
2016	BrainDead	Laurel Healy	Lead role	
2016–2017	Mercy Street	Mary Phinney	Main role	
2017	Fargo	Nikki Swango	Main role (season 3)	
2017	Danger & Eggs	Trix Blixon (voice)	Episode: "The Big Z/Trix Blixon"	
2019	Love, Death & Robots	Gail	Episode: "Ice Age"	
2021	The Late Late Show with James Corden	Herself	Episode: "Drew Barrymore; Mary Elizabeth Winstead"	
2023–2027	Star Wars: Ahsoka	Hera Syndulla	Main role	
2023	Scott Pilgrim Takes Off	Ramona Flowers (voice)	Main role	
2024	A Gentleman in Moscow	Anna Urbanova	Main role	

=== Music videos ===
Year	Title	Artist	Ref.
2010	"Love Your Flawz"	Caitlin Crosby	
2014	"Did We Live Too Fast"	Got a Girl	
2016	"Noise Pollution (Version A, Vocal Up Mix 1.3)"	Portugal. The Man	
2017	"Santa Monica"	Honus Honus	

== Awards and nominations ==
Year	Award	Category	Production	Result	Ref.
2000	Young Artist Award	Best Young Actress in a Daytime TV Series	Passions	Nominated	
2001	Young Artist Award	Best Young Actress in a Daytime TV Series	Passions	Nominated	
2006	Hollywood Film Festival	Best Ensemble Cast (shared with cast)	Bobby	Won	
2006	Broadcast Film Critics Association Award	Best Cast	Bobby	Nominated	
2006	Screen Actors Guild Award	Outstanding Performance by a Cast in a Motion Picture	Bobby	Nominated	
2006	Scream Award	Scream Queen	Black Christmas	Nominated	
2010	IGN Movie Award	Best Ensemble Cast	Scott Pilgrim vs. the World	Nominated	
2010	Teen Choice Awards	Choice Actress Action	Scott Pilgrim vs. the World	Nominated	
2012	Independent Spirit Award	Best Female Lead	Smashed	Nominated	
2012	Phoenix Film Critics Society Award	Best Actress	Smashed	Nominated	
2013	Dallas International Film Festival	Shining Star Award for Best Actress	Smashed	Won	
2013	Daytime Emmy Award	Outstanding New Approaches - Original Daytime Program or Series	The Beauty Inside	Won	
2014	BloodGuts UK Horror Awards	Best Actress	Faults	Nominated	
2016	BloodGuts UK Horror Awards	Best Actress	10 Cloverfield Lane	Nominated	
2016	Fright Meter Awards	Best Actress in a Leading Role	10 Cloverfield Lane	Nominated	
2016	Golden Schmoes Awards	Best Actress of the Year	10 Cloverfield Lane	Nominated	
2017	Saturn Awards	Best Actress	10 Cloverfield Lane	Won	
2018	Awards Circuit Community Awards	Best Supporting Actress (TV Movie or Miniseries)	Fargo	Nominated	
2018	Critics' Choice Television Awards	Best Supporting Actress in a Movie/Miniseries	Fargo	Nominated	
2018	Gold Derby Awards	Best Miniseries/TV Movie Supporting Actress	Fargo	Nominated	
2018	Online Film & Television Association	Best Supporting Actress in a Motion Picture or Limited Series	Fargo	Nominated	
2018	Saturn Awards	Best Actress on Television	Fargo	Nominated	
2018	Newport Beach Film Festival	Icon Award	Body of work	Awarded	
2019	Alliance of Women Film Journalists	Bravest Performance	All About Nina	Nominated	
2024	Astra TV Awards	Best Supporting Actress in a Limited Series or Television Movie	A Gentleman in Moscow	Nominated	
2024	Astra TV Awards	Best Supporting Actress in a Streaming Drama Series	Ahsoka	Nominated	
