= Bleecker Street (company) =

American film company

Bleecker Street Media LLC
- Type: Private
- Industry: Entertainment
- Founded: August 2014; 12 years ago
- Founder: Andrew Karpen
- Headquarters: New York City, New York, U.S.
- Area served: Worldwide
- Key people: Kent Sanderson (CEO); Tyler DiNapoli (president & Chief Marketing Officer); Frank Martinez (president of Distribution); Myles Bender (president of Marketing & Creative Advertising); Rachel Allen (EVP, Publicity); Christine Manna (EVP, Home Entertainment)
- Products: Motion pictures
- Services: Film distribution
- Number of employees: 35 (June 2025)
- Parent: Outerlight Entertainment
- Divisions: Crosswalk
- Website: www.bleeckerstreetmedia.com

Bleecker Street Media LLC is an American independent film company that specializes in film distribution. The company is based in New York City and named after 65 Bleecker Street, the street address of founder Andrew Karpen's prior company Focus Features. Founded in 2014, the studio was established with the goal to distribute "smart house" films that combine the entertainment of studio blockbusters with the artistic indie allure.

Founder and then-CEO Andrew Karpen died of brain cancer in May 2025. The following year, the company was acquired in October by Outerlight Entertainment.

== History ==
Bleecker Street was formed in August 2014 by CEO Andrew Karpen, who was the former co-CEO of Focus Features. It was launched with backing from Manoj Bhargava. With the announcement of the company's formation, Bleecker had indicated an exclusive U.S. distribution output deal with Shivani Rawat's ShivHans Pictures, effective immediately. Initial plans have the distributor releasing three to five pictures in 2015 and expanding from there. Karpen hired four former Focus Feature employees as presidents in September 2014. At the September 2014 Toronto International Film Festival, Bleecker Street made its first film deal for Pawn Sacrifice's North American rights. In the years following, Bleecker Street received Oscar Nominations for their films Trumbo and Captain Fantastic.

Bleecker Street focused on primarily theatrical releases and quickly established itself as a player on the indie-film scene with their titles such as Steven Soderbergh's Logan Lucky and Eye in the Sky, the biggest arthouse release of 2016 starring Helen Mirren. Also starring Helen Mirren in the lead role, Bleecker Street distributed Golda in 2023, receiving another Oscar nomination.

In March 2025, the company acquired distribution rights to both This is Spinal Tap and the film's then-in-production sequel, Spinal Tap II: The End Continues through a deal with producer and co-rightsholder Castle Rock Entertainment, setting a July "41st Anniversary" theatrical re-release for the original Spinal Tap and setting a September theatrical release for the sequel. Founder and then-CEO Andrew Karpen died of an aggressive brain cancer in May 2025 at the age of 59.

In October 2025, Bleecker Street launched Crosswalk, a bespoke event cinema and partnership distribution division focused on event-driven theatrical releases. Crosswalk specializes in programming such as concert films and filmed stage productions, expanding the company’s distribution strategy beyond traditional releases. Early titles under the Crosswalk banner include Stray Kids: The dominATE Experience, a K-pop concert film that debuted at number one at the global box office, as well as the upcoming theatrical release of a filmed version of Hadestown.

In October 2026, Bleecker Street was acquired by Outerlight Entertainment, formerly known as First Look Entertainment, a company which is partially backed by billionaire and eBay founder Pierre Omidyar. Bleecker Street continues to operate independently alongside Topic Studios, another Outerlight company, and its executives will remain in their roles. The company also retains control of its current slate, filmmaker relationships, and marketing and distribution operations.

== Partnerships ==
=== 2015–2019 ===
In January 2015 at Sundance Film Festival, Bleecker Street made its first acquisition of worldwide rights with the purchase of Brett Haley's I'll See You In My Dreams At the same time, the company signed a multi-year home entertainment distribution deal with Universal Pictures Home Entertainment, now distributed by Studio Distribution Services, LLC., a joint venture between UPHE and Warner Bros. Home Entertainment. Later in the month, the company signed a multi-year Canadian distribution deal with Elevation Pictures starting with Danny Collins. Bleecker Street followed that up with an exclusive multi-year licensing agreement with Amazon Prime.

In 2019, Bleecker Street partnered with Hulu on a new output deal granting Hulu exclusive SVOD rights to all upcoming Bleecker Street theatrical films. The first film to hit the streaming service in Fall 2019 was Hotel Mumbai.

=== 2021–2022 ===
In 2021, Bleecker Street partnered with Neon to launch the joint home entertainment distribution company DECAL. DECAL is a standalone full-service operation that handles distribution deals on the home entertainment rights to both NEON and Bleecker Street's curated slate of features. The first film to be distributed through DECAL in Winter 2021 was Bleecker Street's film Supernova.

In February 2022 it was announced that Showtime Networks and Bleecker Street had struck an exclusive three-year output deal for the distributor's movies. It replaces Bleecker Street's previous output agreement with Hulu. Under the agreement, effective March, Showtime will carry Bleecker Street movies on air, on demand and via its streaming services within five months of their initial release. The agreement spans up to 12 films per year, all of which will be released theatrically by Bleecker Street.

Bleecker Street announced their first exclusive short Look at me to be launched on Bleecker Street's app in early 2023, joining a collection of shorts by filmmaking partners including Joe Penna (Arctic), Riley Stearns (The Art of Self-Defense), Gavin Hood (Eye in the Sky), and Alex Huston-Fischer (Save Yourselves!).

It was announced on September 9, 2022, that Bleecker Street has signed an exclusive output deal with Canadian distributor LevelFilm. LevelFilm will handle the Canadian distribution to Bleecker Street's films where they control the North American or worldwide rights. The first movie that will be released under the new joint venture is Catherine Hardwicke's action comedy Mafia Mamma, which stars Toni Collette and Monica Bellucci and is set for a nationwide release in 2023.

On October 27, 2022, Bleecker Street announced that they would team up with Showtime to release a feature-length documentary 2nd Chance from Oscar nominated filmmaker Ramin Bahrani. Bahrani's debut is an exploration of the life and legacy of Richard Davis, the inventor of the modern-day bulletproof vest who shot himself 192 times to prove his product worked. The film opened in New York and Los Angeles on Friday, December 2, expanding to additional cities December 9. Showtime then premiered the film on air, on streaming and on demand for all Showtime subscribers in spring 2023.

=== 2023 ===
In September 2023, the company announced a joint acquisition deal with Elysian Film Group and Anonymous Content to acquire British and Irish distribution rights to Hayao Miyazaki's The Boy and the Heron from sales agent Goodfellas. This acquisition marked the first UK and Irish acquisition from the company, as well as their first animated acquisition.
