= Dan the Automator =

American record producer (born 1966)

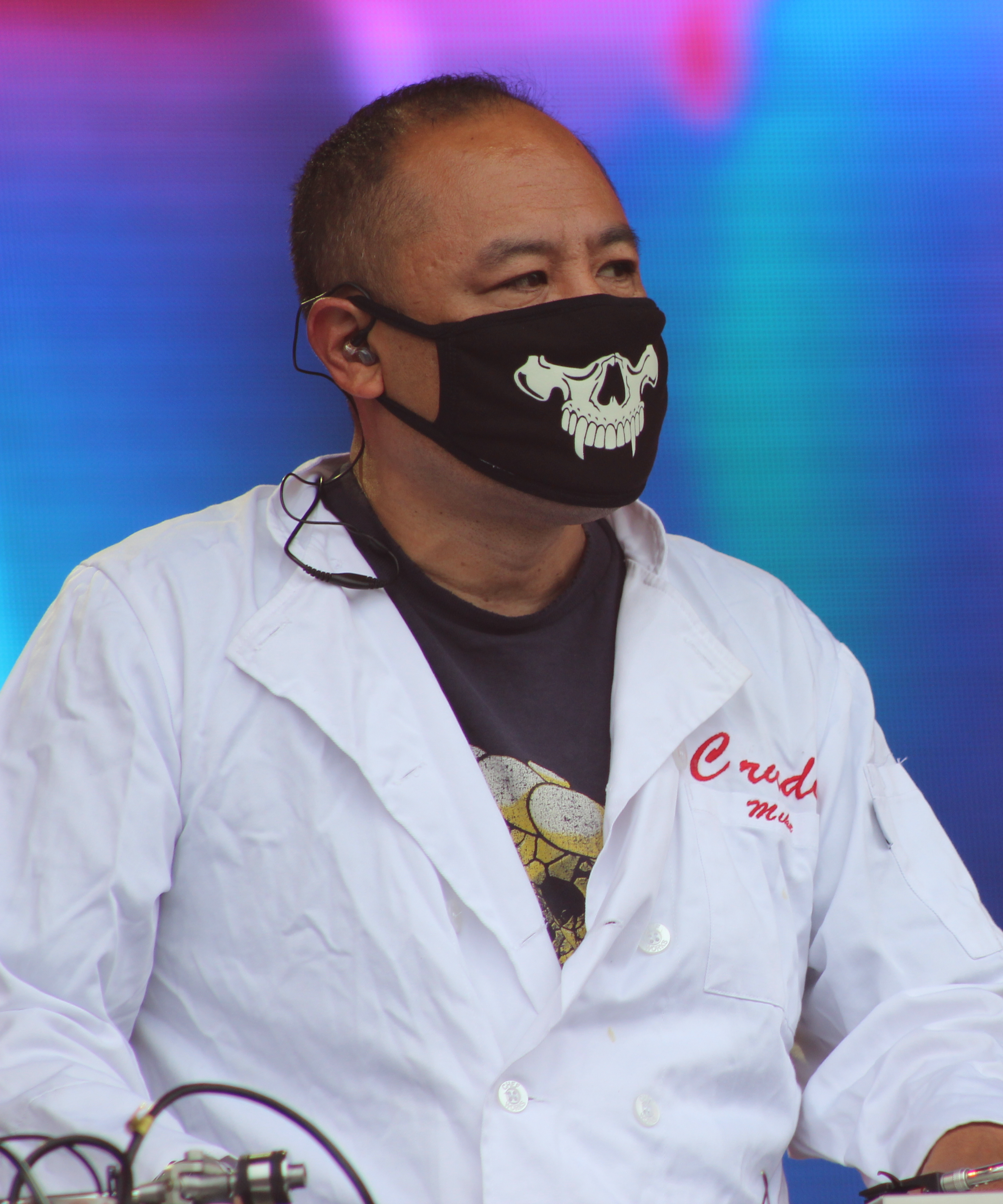
- Dan the Automator in 2017

Background information
- Also known as: Automator; Dan Nakamura; Nathaniel Merriweather
- Born: Daniel M. Nakamura; August 29, 1966 (age 59); San Francisco, California, U.S.
- Genres: Hip-hop; psychedelic rap
- Occupations: Record producer; disc jockey; composer; engineer
- Years active: 1986–present
- Labels: 75 Ark; Bulk; Decon; Lakeshore; Ubiquity
- Member of: Handsome Boy Modeling School; Deltron 3030; Got a Girl
- Formerly of: Lovage; Head Automatica
- Website: dantheautomator.com

Daniel M. Nakamura (born August 29, 1966), better known by his stage name Dan the Automator, is an American record producer. He is the founder of the publishing company Sharkman Music and the record label 75 Ark.

== Early life ==
Daniel M. Nakamura was born in San Francisco, California, in 1966. His parents spent time in Japanese internment camps as children. His father worked for the San Francisco Redevelopment Agency and his mother taught at City College of San Francisco. As a child, he learned to play violin. While in high school, he became immersed in hip-hop culture. He graduated from San Francisco State University.

== Career ==
Nakamura started his career as a DJ when he was a teenager. After seeing the younger DJs DJ Qbert and Mix Master Mike performing live, he decided to focus on producing tracks. He first gained attention for his work on Kool Keith's 1996 album Dr. Octagonecologyst. His debut EP, Music to Be Murdered By, was released in 1989. He released his debut album A Much Better Tomorrow in 2000, an expansion of his 1996 EP A Better Tomorrow. Keith featured extensively across both versions. In 2002, he released the compilation album Wanna Buy a Monkey? In 2006, he released another compilation titled Dan the Automator Presents 2K7, which served as the soundtrack album for NBA 2K7. He composed the score for the 2019 comedy film Booksmart, with the soundtrack album released that same year.

=== Collaborations ===
In 1999, Nakamura and Prince Paul formed the collaborative project Handsome Boy Modeling School, assuming the alter egos Nathaniel Merriweather and Chest Rockwell, respectively. Their debut album So... How's Your Girl? featured numerous guest musicians, including Róisín Murphy, DJ Shadow, and Del the Funky Homosapien. They released a second album, White People, in November 2004, with collaborators including RZA, Cat Power, and Mike Patton. Nakamura used the Nathaniel Merriweather pseudonym for his Lovage project with Patton and Jennifer Charles. After Paul briefly left the duo over a business dispute, Handsome Boy Modeling School have since played further shows and spoken of a forthcoming third album.

In 2000, Nakamura joined Del the Funky Homosapien and Kid Koala to form Deltron 3030. They released their eponymous debut album the same year, featuring guest appearances by Sean Lennon and Damon Albarn. In 2001, he produced the debut album of Albarn's "animated" band Gorillaz, appearing as a member of the band, alongside Del the Funky Homosapien. Both later appeared on the second Deltron 3030 record, Event 2, released in September 2013. The album also featured appearances by Jamie Cullum, Emily Wells and Zack De La Rocha, with interludes performed by actors David Cross, Amber Tamblyn and Joseph Gordon-Levitt.

Nakamura is one half of Got a Girl, along with actress Mary Elizabeth Winstead. The duo's debut album, I Love You but I Must Drive Off This Cliff Now, was released in 2014. In September 2015, they embarked on a four-city tour of Seattle, San Francisco, New York City, and Los Angeles, where they played their entire album live, including a cover of Handsome Boy Modeling School's "I've Been Thinking".

In 2023, Handsome Boy Modeling School released a limited release LP of 7 new songs in collaboration with Fords Gin.

In 2025, Nakamura was announced as one of the remixers for the 2026 FIFA World Cup theme, representing the San Francisco Bay Area.

== Discography ==
=== Studio albums ===
- A Much Better Tomorrow (2000)
- Booksmart: Score by Dan the Automator (2019)
- Easter Sunday: Music from the Motion Picture (2022)

=== Compilation albums ===
- Wanna Buy a Monkey? (2002)
- Dan the Automator Presents 2K7 (2006)

=== Remix albums ===
- Bombay The Hard Way: Guns, Cars and Sitars (1998)

=== EPs ===
- Music to Be Murdered By (1989)
- King of the Beats (1990)
- A Better Tomorrow (1996)

=== Singles ===
- "Bear Witness III (Once Again)" (2002)
- "Rapper's Delight" (2009)

=== Productions ===
- Dr. Octagon - Dr. Octagonecologyst (1996)
- Cornershop - When I Was Born for the 7th Time (1997)
- Kalyanji–Anandji - Bombay the Hard Way: Guns, Cars and Sitars (1998)
- Jon Spencer Blues Explosion - Acme (1998)
- Handsome Boy Modeling School - So... How's Your Girl? (1999)
- Primal Scream - XTRMNTR (2000)
- Deltron 3030 - Deltron 3030 (2000)
- Gorillaz - Gorillaz (2001)
- Lovage - Music to Make Love to Your Old Lady By (2001)
- Ben Lee - Hey You. Yes You. (2002)
- Galactic - Ruckus (2003)
- Handsome Boy Modeling School - White People (2004)
- Head Automatica - Decadence (2004)
- Jamie Cullum - Catching Tales (2005)
- Teriyaki Boyz - Beef or Chicken (2005)
- Peeping Tom - Peeping Tom (2006)
- Little Barrie - Stand Your Ground (2006)
- Josh Haden - Devoted (2007)
- Men Without Pants - Naturally (2008)
- Anaïs Croze - The Love Album (2008)
- Kasabian - West Ryder Pauper Lunatic Asylum (2009)
- Dredg - Chuckles and Mr. Squeezy (2011)
- Miles Kane - Colour of the Trap (2011)
- Lateef the Truthspeaker - Firewire (2011)
- Kasabian - Velociraptor! (2011)
- DRC Music - Kinshasa One Two (2011)
- Pillowfight - Pillowfight (2013)
- Jamie Cullum - Momentum (2013)
- Deltron 3030 - Event 2 (2013)
- Got a Girl - I Love You but I Must Drive Off This Cliff Now (2014)
- Exodus - "Black 13" (2014)
- Dr. Octagon - Moosebumps: An Exploration Into Modern Day Horripilation (2018)
- Black Keys - Ohio Players (album) (2024)
- Dan the Automator - Dan the Automator Presents: Good Advice for Suckers (2024)

=== Film music/scoring ===
- Scream 2 - "Right Place Wrong Time" (1997)
- Ocean's Eleven - "The Projects (P Jays)" (2001)
- Slackers - "Rock n' Roll (Could Never Hip Hop Like This)," "Holy Calamity" (2002)
- Blade II - "Gorillaz on my Mind" (2002)
- Tony Hawk's Underground - "A Better Tomorrow," "Positive Contact'' (2003)
- Tony Hawk's Underground 2 - "Holy Calamity (Bear Witness II)" (2004)
- Charmed - "Fallen" (2005)
- Californication - "Mojo" (2007)
- The Sopranos - Stage 5 Remix (2007)
- Scott Pilgrim vs The World - "Slick (Patel's Song)" (featuring Satya Bhabha), "Ninja Ninja Revolution" (2010)
- Better Call Saul - "The Truth" (2015)
- Money Monster - "What Makes the World Go Round? (Money!)" "Da Da Da" (2016)
- Booksmart - Original Score & Music
- Always Be My Maybe - "Hello Peril" "I Punched Keanu Reeves" (2019)
- Broken Bread - Original Score Season 1 (2019)
- Holidate - Original Score (2020)
- Dash & Lilly - Original Score (2020)
- Salt & Pepa - Music (2021)
- Easter Sunday - Original Score (2022)
