= The Art of Self-Defense (2019 film) =

American martial arts black comedy film

- Theatrical release poster
- Directed by: Riley Stearns
- Written by: Riley Stearns
- Produced by: Andrew Kortschak; Walter Kortschak; Cody Ryder; Stephane Whonsetler
- Starring: Jesse Eisenberg; Alessandro Nivola; Imogen Poots
- Cinematography: Michael Ragen
- Edited by: Sarah Beth Shapiro
- Music by: Heather McIntosh
- Production company: End Cue
- Distributed by: Bleecker Street
- Release dates: March 10, 2019 (SXSW); July 12, 2019 (United States)
- Running time: 104 minutes
- Country: United States
- Language: English
- Box office: $2.4 million

The Art of Self-Defense is a 2019 American martial arts black comedy film written and directed by Riley Stearns and starring Jesse Eisenberg, Alessandro Nivola, and Imogen Poots. It had its world premiere at South by Southwest on March 10, 2019, and was released in the United States on July 12, 2019, by Bleecker Street.

== Plot ==
Timid and awkward accountant Casey is brutally attacked on the street by a motorcycle gang. He comes across a dōjō led by a charismatic man referred to as "Sensei" and, after taking a trial class, decides to learn karate for protection instead of purchasing a firearm. Despite his physical weakness, Casey's determination impresses Sensei and he is promoted to yellow belt at their next promotion ceremony, while Anna, the sole female student and children's class teacher of the dōjō, is secretly denied promotion to black belt by Sensei because she is female.

As Casey learns the dōjō's strange customs - its unbreakable set of rules and the praising of its powerful grandmaster, who is promoted as having developed a technique of punching through an opponent's skull with his index finger - he himself becomes more masculine: looking at pornography at work; attacking his boss; and listening to loud, angry music.

Further impressed, Sensei invites Casey to the exclusive night classes, where he breaks a student's arm and expels him from the dōjō for showing up uninvited. Anna brutally defeats Thomas, the student promoted to black belt over her, to prove her worth, but Sensei disqualifies her for her aggression despite him usually approving of it.

Sensei claims he has located one of the men who attacked Casey and they track him to a bar, where he pushes Casey to attack him as retribution. He later realizes the man was innocent and returns home to find his pet Dachshund dead, kicked to death by a technique he recognizes as Sensei's. Casey confronts him and threatens to report him to the authorities, only to find that Sensei videotaped him attacking the man. He tries to attack Sensei, but is easily defeated.

At the next night session, Sensei takes Casey and several other students to go out on motorcycles. They target a man who turns out to be an undercover cop. Anna is shot in the leg and Casey kills the cop. Sensei awards Casey a red stripe on his belt to signify his having killed a man. Anna, who also has a red stripe, confides in Casey that she got hers after killing a black belt who tried to sexually assault her. She urges him to leave the dōjō.

Casey returns home to find an aggressive German Shepherd gifted to him by Sensei, which will attack him unless he can control it. Pushed to his limit, he breaks into the dōjō at night, finding videotapes that document every attack Sensei ordered. He watches his own attack, in which Thomas is ordered to kill him but Anna stops him. He also finds that Sensei makes money by extorting former students.

The next morning, Sensei arrives at the dōjō to find the exiled student dead, hanging by his own belt, and he burns the body in a crematorium in the back office. Casey approaches Sensei and challenges him to a fight to the death, only to draw a handgun when the fight starts and shoot him in the head.

As the students arrive for the next class, Casey displays Sensei's body and claims he killed him with the grandmaster's technique, making him the new Sensei. He chooses to give his position to Anna instead and, after finding his Dachshund's bite mark on Thomas's arm, has him killed by his German Shepherd, which now obeys him. Anna proclaims that the dōjō will be centered around more compassionate, defensive teachings, and Casey becomes the new teacher of the children's class.

== Cast ==
- Jesse Eisenberg as Casey Davies
- Imogen Poots as Anna
- Alessandro Nivola as Leslie "Sensei"
- Steve Terada as Thomas
- Phillip Andre Botello as Kenneth
- David Zellner as Henry
- Hauke Bahr as Grant
- Jason Burkey as Alex

Leland Orser and Josh Fadem cameo as a detective and serial killer, respectively, in a film within a film watched by Casey. Caroline Amiguet voices a French language instructor.

== Production ==
In May 2016, it was announced Mary Elizabeth Winstead had joined the cast of the film, with her husband Riley Stearns directing from a screenplay he wrote. In 2017 Winstead announced her separation from Stearns. In September 2017, it was announced Jesse Eisenberg, Imogen Poots and Alessandro Nivola joined the cast of the film, with Poots replacing Winstead, and Andrew Kortschak, Cody Ryder, Stephanie Whonsetler and Walter Kortschak serving as producers on the film, while Bleecker Street distributed the film.

Principal photography began on September 11, 2017, in Kentucky.

== Release ==
The film had its world premiere at South by Southwest on March 10, 2019. It was released in select theaters on July 12, 2019. The film was released nationwide on July 19, 2019.

=== Home media ===
The film was released on Blu-ray and DVD in the United States on October 15, 2019.

== Reception ==
On Rotten Tomatoes, the film holds an approval rating of 84% based on 166 reviews, with an average rating of 7.3/10. The site's critical consensus reads, "The Art of Self-Defense grapples compellingly with modern American masculinity and serves as an outstanding calling card for writer-director Riley Stearns." On Metacritic, the film has a weighted average score of 65 out of 100, based on 32 critics, indicating "generally favorable reviews".

Peter Debruge of Variety wrote, "This singular black comedy balances off-kilter humor with an unexpectedly thriller-esque undercurrent, to the extent that audiences will find it tough to anticipate either the jokes or the dark, Fight Club-like turn things eventually take — all to strikingly original effect."

Writing in Rolling Stone, Peter Travers gives the film 2.5 out of 3 stars, writing: "The Art of Self-Defense sets itself up as the 90-pound weakling destined to live forever in the shadow of Fight Club. The good news is that writer-director Riley Stearns gets in a few good licks at toxic masculinity before odious comparisons to David Fincher's masterpiece blunt the film's comic and dramatic impact.
