= Bombay 2: Electric Vindaloo =

Remix album by Kalyanji–Anandji
- Released: 2001

Kalyanji–Anandji chronology
Bombay the Hard Way: Guns, Cars and Sitars (1998)	Bombay 2: Electric Vindaloo (2001)

Bombay 2: Electric Vindaloo is a 2001 album showcasing remixed and original songs from movie soundtrack composing duo Kalyanji–Anandji. This album is a sequel to Bombay the Hard Way: Guns, Cars and Sitars released on Motel Records in 1998. While Bombay the Hard Way: Guns, Cars and Sitars centered around '70s era Bollywood music, Bombay 2: Electric Vindaloo "leaps forward into the electro-‘80s, when Bollywood soundtracks moved on from funk to the kind of drum machine-driven, synthesizer heavy sound"

== Track listing ==
1. "Ram Balram" Remix – Ursula 1000 4:49
2. "Bionic Kakaan" Remix – DJ Me DJ You 3:17
3. "Theme From Twin Sheiks 1:07
4. "Third World Lover" Remix – Dynomite D, Kid Koala 5:34
5. "Rah-keet" 2:42
6. "Hydrolik Carpet Ride" Remix – Mix Master Mike 4:20
7. "Bollywood B-boy Battle" 2:56
8. "Mr.natwarlal" Remix – DJ Me DJ You 2:59
9. "Basmati Beatdown" Remix – Dynomite D 6:20
10. "T.J. Hookah" 1:02
11. "Superstar Sam " 1:14
12. "Disco Raj" Remix – DJ Me DJ You 4:17
13. "Sexy Mother Fakir" 2:38
14. "Inspector Jay's Big Score" Remix – Spic-Beatz & Pak-Man 5:58
15. "Electric Vindaloo" Remix – Steinski 4:19
16. "Dil Street Blues" 2:13
17. "Chakra Khan" 3:55
