= Faults (film) =

- Film poster
- Directed by: Riley Stearns
- Written by: Riley Stearns
- Produced by: Mary Elizabeth Winstead; Keith Calder; Jessica Wu
- Starring: Leland Orser; Mary Elizabeth Winstead; Chris Ellis; Jon Gries; Lance Reddick; Beth Grant
- Cinematography: Michael Ragen
- Edited by: Sarah Beth Shapiro
- Music by: Heather McIntosh
- Production company: Snoot Entertainment
- Distributed by: Screen Media Films
- Release dates: March 9, 2014 (SXSW); March 6, 2015 (United States)
- Running time: 93 minutes
- Country: United States
- Language: English

Faults is a 2014 dark comedy psychological thriller film written and directed by Riley Stearns in his feature film debut. The film stars Mary Elizabeth Winstead, Leland Orser, Jon Gries, Beth Grant, Chris Ellis and Lance Reddick. The film premiered at the 2014 SXSW on March 9, 2014, and was picked up by Screen Media Films for theatrical release on March 6, 2015.

== Plot ==
Ansel Roth, a writer and cult specialist, fraudulently uses an expired voucher to pay for a meal at a hotel restaurant and is forcibly removed when discovered. The hotel manager tells Roth that his speaking engagement is almost ready, but that his complimentary stay was for just last night; Roth steals towels and batteries as he checks out. His presentation on cults is interrupted by a heckler, who beats him up for his involvement in the suicide of a troubled woman, the man's sister, who had been involved with a cult. Evelyn and Paul approach Roth and request an autographed copy of his book for their daughter, Claire, who has become involved in Faults, a mysterious cult. Roth declines to become involved.

Mick, an employee of Roth's manager Terry, approaches Roth in the parking lot with a letter. Terry has dropped Roth as a client and wants Roth's debts paid back within a week. Evelyn and Paul again request his help, and he agrees to listen to them when they offer to buy him breakfast. Roth offers to deprogram Claire, a process that involves abducting her and confronting her with the truth about the cult. Roth hires two men to help him abduct Claire; one of them strikes her during the abduction. They take her to an isolated motel and prevent her from sleeping.

After paying the men, Roth begins the process of deprogramming. Excited that she is being cooperative, he lets Claire see her parents, who are in an adjoining room, then lets her sleep (to go from "feeling" while sleep-deprived to "thinking" when well-rested and awake). When questioned the next day, Claire reveals that Faults has taught her how she exists separately from her body, and that members of the group advance to successive levels; she explains that their leader, Ira, has evolved to its top level and is "no more." Paul becomes increasingly demanding and controlling of both the situation and his daughter, and becomes enraged when Roth mediates. The deprogramming is interrupted when Mick locates Roth and again demands payment. Roth requests half of his fee from Paul, who reluctantly agrees. Roth advises Paul and Evelyn to lock Claire in the bathroom overnight (he has moved the lock to the outside) to prevent her from escaping while he is gone.

Roth delivers partial payment to Terry, who berates him for being so submissive, strikes him with a paperweight, and demands the rest of the money in two days. Roth is surprised to find Claire unconscious outside the hotel room. When he brings her back inside, her parents say she was locked in the bathroom; Claire claims to have teleported herself using meditation techniques learned from the cult. Pressure mounts on Roth, who suffers from lack of sleep, physical abuse, and threats from everyone but Claire. She seduces him as he experiences a nervous breakdown. Afterward, Roth watches a videotape of his failed television show while Claire has sex with Paul in the background as Evelyn watches.

Roth wakes in his car. He rushes to the hotel room and finds Claire alone. Her parents have left, and she seems puzzled when Roth confusedly questions her about the videotape and her sexual encounter. Roth and Claire become accidentally trapped in the bathroom when the door closes and locks from the outside. As the phone rings, Roth becomes hysterical, knowing that it must be Terry. Claire then forces him to face his many failures, including his divorce and guilt over the girl's suicide. Roth admits he exploited her for his short-lived television series. While leading Roth in meditation, Claire breaks him and convinces him he has unlocked the bathroom door using his mind.

As they exit the bathroom, Mick enters the hotel room. Terry follows him there after he becomes impatient and is horrified to find Mick dead. Terry explains that Mick was just an actor hired to intimidate Roth. Roth beats Terry to death with his book as Claire observes. Claire, now in complete control, tells Roth to go wait in the car. Paul and Evelyn, hidden in the next room, then say they have murdered the man who struck her during her abduction, as Claire requested. They identify her as Ira, and she gives her thanks by kissing them on the lips and handing each a pill, which they swallow before lying down. When she joins Roth in the car, he apologizes for the door being broken. She tells Roth to not apologize for anything because they have each other and they are strong. When he asks where he is going, she replies, "Home".

== Cast ==
- Leland Orser as Ansel Roth
- Mary Elizabeth Winstead as Claire
- Jon Gries as Terry
- Lance Reddick as Mick
- Beth Grant as Evelyn
- Chris Ellis as Paul

== Production ==
Stearns came up with the idea by being inspired and fascinated with the process of deprogramming that was introduced by Ted Patrick in mid-to-late 1970s. He also stated that the interest came when he watched an episode of Cops when he was a child, in which "a girl called the police and was like, 'I'm locked in this hotel room and they're not letting me out.' […] and the cops told her that her parents knew what was best and that she had to stay. And they left. And I was freaked out by that because even as a kid you realize there’s something weird about that – telling you that you have to stay in a place you don't want to be".

Stearns cited Paul Thomas Anderson's works, namely Punch-Drunk Love, The Coen Brothers' Fargo, Yorgos Lanthimos' Dogtooth and Alps among the many works he was inspired by.

To prepare themselves for their roles, Winstead and Orser read the book Let Our Children Go by Ted Patrick and watched YouTube videos from that era of people in cults or people who had just gotten out of cults. They had both also created their own backstories for their characters based on Stearns' script. Winstead has repeatedly mentioned that Claire is her most challenging role to date. "I have to play a few different characters over the course of the film [and] I had to sort of really keep track from scene to scene to remind myself of where she was," Winstead says.

The film was shot in 18 days in the Los Angeles area (Long Beach and San Pedro).

== Release ==
The film had its world premiere at the SXSW on March 9, 2014, followed by additional screenings on March 10, 12 and 13. It was also screened at the Maryland Film Festival on May 9 and May 10, as well as at the Fantasia Festival on July 18 and July 24. Faults screened at the London FrightFest Film Festival on August 24. The film played at the Australian Film Festival on August 16, and also at the AFI Fest from November 6 to 13.

On August 26, it was reported that Screen Media Films had picked up Faults for theatrical release on March 6, 2015 and to run on Video on demand.

== Reception ==
Faults has received positive response since its release. Rotten Tomatoes has given Faults an approval score of 92% based on 37 select reviews. The website's critics consensus reads, "Faults explores the cult dynamic to fascinating effect, bolstered by an outstanding cast and sharp work from writer-director Riley Stearns." Many reviewers commended the film's off-kilter black comedy that underlies the plot; The Hollywood Reporter says, "Faults is not what it seems. Though a black-comic atmosphere persists, the debut feature is serious about manipulation and brainwashing, and a quietly commanding performance by Mary Elizabeth Winstead helps establish that seriousness". In a 4.5/5 review, Bloody Disgusting calls it "a modern cult thriller [... that] manages to be laugh out loud funny in a manner that doesn't even come close to undercutting its central objective". IndieWire's writeup that gives it a grade of B+ praises the film's cast, saying "Much of the odd comedic formula emerges from a pair of carefully orchestrated lead performances".
