= Lovage (band) =

American band

- Origin: United States
- Genres: Downtempo, psychedelic, trip hop, lounge
- Years active: 2000–2002
- Label: 75 Ark/Tommy Boy/Warner Bros.
- Members: Dan the Automator; Mike Patton; Jennifer Charles; Kid Koala; Brandon Arnovick

Lovage was a collaborative project headed by Dan the Automator, under his pseudonym "Nathaniel Merriweather" (a persona he created for the project Handsome Boy Modeling School). Their only album is titled Music to Make Love to Your Old Lady By, which was created in team with Mike Patton and Jennifer Charles, who both provide vocals. Kid Koala plays turntables and samples and toured with the band for their 13-city U.S. tour.

== Discography ==
- Music to Make Love to Your Old Lady By (75 Ark/Tommy Boy/Warner Bros. 2001)

=== Music videos ===
- "Book of the Month"
- "Stroker Ace"
