= 75 Ark =

American hip hop record label

- Founded: 1998
- Founder: Erik Gilbert
- Distributor: Tommy Boy Music
- Genre: Hip hop
- Country of origin: United States
- Location: San Francisco, California

75 Ark is a hip hop record label based in San Francisco, California. It was created in 1998 when Toni Isabella, Anne Cook, along with Erik Gilbert and Rachel Matthews of Asphodel Records, left to form and run 75 Ark. NicheMusic was the parent company of 75 Ark, founded by David S Schulhof. Dan the Automator was one of the label's co-founders. In June 2000, 75 Ark became the first record label to sign a deal with Napster.

In 2002, Erik Gilbert formed Coup d'État Entertainment. However, this label never achieved the level of success as 75 Ark.

== Artists ==
- Dr. Octagon (reissues)
- Antipop Consortium
- The Nextmen
- The Coup
- Deltron 3030
- Lovage
- Dan the Automator

== See also ==
- List of record labels
