= Deltron 3030 =

American/Canadian hip-hop group

- Genre: Hip-hop
- Years active: 1999–present
- Labels: 75 Ark, Bulk
- Members: Dan the Automator; Del the Funky Homosapien; Kid Koala

Deltron 3030 is an American/Canadian hip-hop trio composed of producer Dan the Automator (as the Cantankerous Captain Aptos), rapper Del the Funky Homosapien (as Deltron Zero/Deltron Osiris), and DJ Kid Koala (as Skiznod the Boy Wonder). They also collaborate with a variety of other musicians under many futuristic pseudonyms.

== History ==
=== Deltron 3030 ===
The group's debut album Deltron 3030, released on May 23, 2000, is a concept album set in the year 3030 that tells of the dualistic conflict of fatalism that takes place between the moral concepts of "righteousness" and "malevolence."

The album is about warrior named Deltron-Zero and a time-traveling cyborg wizard named the Automator who face off against megalithic corporations that rule over a thermodynamic universe.

The lyrics were written in less than two weeks and are characterized by extravagant allusions to futuristic outer-space themes in the tradition of Afrofuturist works by Sun Ra and George Clinton. Many samples originated with the contemporary French classical composer William Sheller.

=== Event 2 ===
Deltron 3030's second album, titled Event 2, was released in September 2013.

Production began as far back as 2004, and in November 2006 Del told IGN that four songs were already written and that "the album's lyrical theme has been basically mapped out." Dan the Automator stated that the recording of the new album would probably be completed by December 2006, and that it would be released in 2007. Due to a series of delays, group members issued a number of statements predicting imminent completion in 2008, 2010, 2011, and 2012.

On June 11, 2012, Deltron 3030 performed at the Luminato festival in Toronto, Ontario, a show that Kid Koala dubbed the Deltron Event 2 World Premiere. The group played with a full horn, strings, and rhythm section conducted by Dan the Automator, premiered ten songs from Event 2, and revealed the visual style of the new album. In accordance with Del's statement that "3030 actually was one event, but these events can span centuries." The first single from the album was "City Rising From the Ashes," a song influenced by the story of Osiris. On September 23, 2013, Event 2 was put on Pitchfork's Advance Streaming service in its entirety, one week before its official release.

In October 2016, an expanded edition of Event 2 was released, featuring instrumentals from the album. Alongside this new addition, a live album featuring Deltron 3030, many of their collaborators from the Event 2 album, and the 3030 Orchestra, simply entitled Live, was released.

=== Upcoming third album ===
On an episode of Red Bull Radio Peak Time in 2018, Dan The Automator confirmed he was working on a new Deltron 3030 album, stating "there's a couple songs that exist." He also hinted that Dr. Octagon would have a cameo on the album.

On April 22, 2025, Deltron 3030 announced a North American tour for the 25th anniversary of their debut album, Deltron 3030, stating that they would play the album in its entirety at these shows; Kid Koala and Lealani were announced as openers on the tour. In the associated press release, StereoGum provided an update on their upcoming third studio album: "Meanwhile, the crew is working on their third LP to follow 2013's Event 2."

== Discography ==
Year	Album details	Peak chart positions			
Year	Album details	US	US R&B	US Indie	US Rap
2000	Deltron 3030: Release date: May 23, 2000; Label: 75 Ark	194	90	18	—
2013	Event 2: Release date: September 30, 2013; Label: Deltron Partners, Bulk Recordings	41	13	3	6
2016	Live: Release date: October 11, 2016; Label: Bulk Recordings	—	—	—	—
"—" denotes releases that did not chart
