= Dream art =

Art based on dreams or meant to resemble dreams

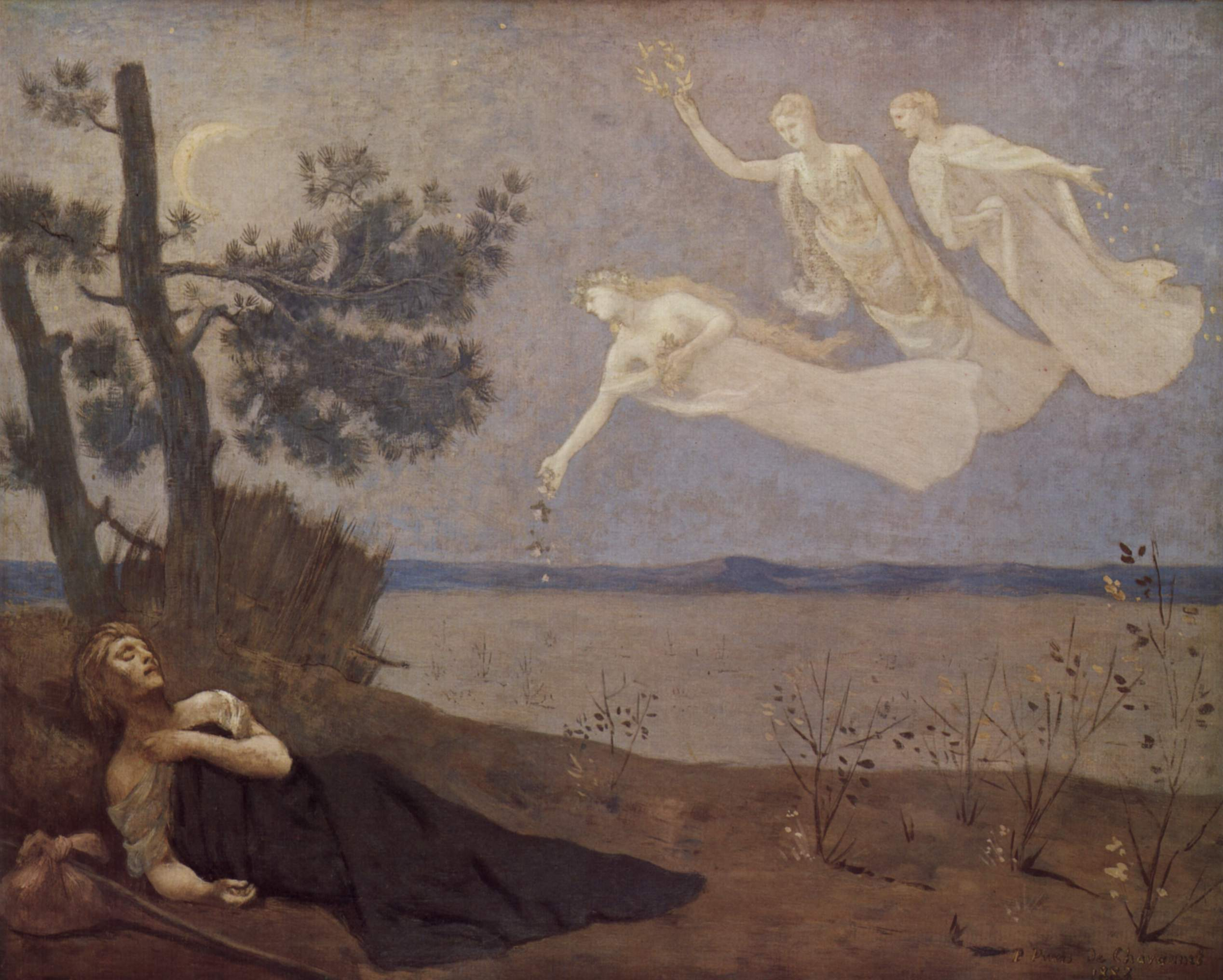
Pierre-Cécile Puvis de Chavannes: The Dream, 1883

Dream art is any form of art that is directly based on a material from one's dreams, or a material that resembles dreams, but not directly based on them.

== History ==
The first known reference to dream art was in the 12th century, when artists found a new way to look at art. However, dreams as art, without a "real" frame story, appear to be a later development, since art describing dreams from that period was often more depictions of biblical stories—though there is no way to know whether many premodern works were dream-based.

In European literature, the Romantic movement emphasized the value of emotion and irrational inspiration. "Visions", whether from dreams or intoxication, served as raw material and were taken to represent the artist's highest creative potential.

In the late 19th and early 20th centuries, Symbolism and Expressionism introduced dream imagery into visual art. Expressionism was also a literary movement, and included the later work of the playwright August Strindberg, who coined the term "dream play" for a style of narrative that did not distinguish between fantasy and reality. He later wrote a play of the same name in 1901.

At the same time, discussion of dreams reached a new level of public awareness in the Western world due to the work of Sigmund Freud, who introduced the notion of the subconscious mind as a field of scientific inquiry. Freud greatly influenced the 20th-century Surrealists, who combined the visionary impulses of Romantics and Expressionists with a focus on the unconscious as a creative tool, and an assumption that apparently irrational content could contain significant meaning, perhaps more so than rational content.

The invention of film and animation brought new possibilities for vivid depiction of nonrealistic events, but films consisting entirely of dream imagery have remained an avant-garde rarity. Comic books and comic strips have explored dreams somewhat more often, starting with Winsor McCay's popular newspaper strips; the trend toward confessional works in alternative comics of the 1980s saw a proliferation of artists drawing their own dreams.

In the collection, The Committee of Sleep, Harvard psychologist Deirdre Barrett identifies modern dream-inspired art such as paintings including Jasper Johns's Flag, much of the work of Jim Dine and Salvador Dalí, novels ranging from Sophie's Choice to works by Anne Rice and Stephen King and films including Robert Altman's Three Women, John Sayles Brother from Another Planet and Ingmar Bergman's Wild Strawberries. That book also describes how the song "Yesterday" by Paul McCartney was heard by him in a dream and most of Billy Joel's and Ladysmith Black Mambazo's music has originated in dreams.

Dream material continues to be used by a wide range of contemporary artists for various purposes. This practice is considered by some to be of psychological value for the artist—independent of the artistic value of the results—as part of the discipline of "dream work".

The international Association for the Study of Dreams holds an annual juried show of visual dream art.

== Notable works directly based on dreams ==
=== Visual art ===
- Many works by William Blake (1757–1827)
- Many works by Salvador Dalí (1904–1989)
- Many works by Man Ray
- Many works by Max Magnus Norman
- Many works by Odilon Redon (1840–1916)
- Many works by Jonathan Borofsky (born 1942)
- Many works by Jim Shaw (born 1952)

=== Literature ===
- Kubla Khan (1816) by Samuel Taylor Coleridge (possibly based on a dream provoked by opium)
- Frankenstein (1818) by Mary Shelley
- The Strange Case of Dr. Jekyll and Mr. Hyde (1886) by Robert Louis Stevenson
- Dracula, which Bram Stoker claimed was inspired by a nightmare he had experienced
- Ten Nights' Dreams (1908) by Natsume Soseki
- The Dream-Quest of Unknown Kadath (1927) and other works by H.P. Lovecraft
- The Kin of Ata Are Waiting for You (1971) by Dorothy Bryant
- Most of Clive Barker's work
- The Art of Dreaming (1993) by Carlos Castaneda
- Twilight (2005) by Stephenie Meyer
- The Facts of Winter (2005) by Paul LaFarge

=== Film ===
- Several films of Andrei Tarkovsky, most notably The Mirror
- The major films of Sergei Parajanov, most notably Sayat Nova and Shadows of Forgotten Ancestors
- Much of the filmography of David Lynch (e.g. Eraserhead, Blue Velvet, Mulholland Drive, etc.)
- The Brother from Another Planet by John Sayles
- Dreams (1990) by Akira Kurosawa
- Many works of Federico Fellini (1920–1993)
- The works of Luis Buñuel
- Meshes of the Afternoon (1943), At Land (1944), and Ritual in Transfigured Time (1946) by Maya Deren.
- 3 Women (1977) by Robert Altman
- Eyes Wide Shut (1999) by Stanley Kubrick
- Waking Life (2001) by Richard Linklater
- Destino (2003), an animated short film by Dominique Monféry
- Eternal Sunshine of the Spotless Mind (2004) and Science of Sleep (2006) by Michel Gondry
- Paprika (2006) by Satoshi Kon
- Dream (2008) by Kim Ki-duk
- Lucid Dream (2017) by Kim Joon-sung
- Napping Princess by Kenji Kamiyama (2017)
- 118 (2019) by K. V. Guhan
- Malignant (2021) by James Wan
- Last Night in Soho (2021) by Edgar Wright
- Slumberland (2022) by Francis Lawrence

=== Comics ===
- Many short works of Julie Doucet
- Many short works of David B.
- Jim by Jim Woodring
- Psychonaut by Aleksandar Zograf
- Rare Bit Fiends by Rick Veitch
- Slow Wave by Jesse Reklaw

=== Music ===
- Devil's Trill Sonata by Giuseppe Tartini
- Réverie by Claude Debussy
- La Villa Strangiato by Rush (the song was inspired by nightmares guitarist Alex Lifeson would have, though the band came up with the music themselves)
- Selected Ambient Works Volume II by Aphex Twin
- Yesterday by The Beatles (written by Paul McCartney)
- El Cielo by Dredg
- Inside a Dream by Jane Wiedlin
- Isn't Anything and Loveless by My Bloody Valentine
- And the Glass-Handed Kites and other works of Mew
- If I Needed You by Townes Van Zandt
- The Pros and Cons of Hitch Hiking by Roger Waters
- Lucid Dreams by Celia Green
- Micro Cuts by Muse
- My Fruit Psychobells...A Seed Combustible, Bath, Leaving Your Body Map, and Part the Second by maudlin of the Well
- Dimethyltryptamine by Jay Electronica
- Until the Quiet Comes by Flying Lotus
- Dreaming by Blondie

=== Video Games ===
- Yume Nikki by Kikiyama
- Omori by Omocat
- LSD: Dream Emulator by Asmik Ace Entertainment
- Dreams by Media Molecule
- Deltarune by Toby Fox

== Works intended to resemble dreams, but not directly based on them ==
=== Novels ===
- Alice's Adventures in Wonderland by Lewis Carroll (1865)
- The Nightmare has Triplets trilogy by James Branch Cabell
  - Smirt: An Urbane Nightmare (1934)
  - Smith: A Sylvan Interlude (1934)
  - Smire: An Acceptance in the Third Person (1937)
- The Coma by Alex Garland
- "Darkness at Noon" by Arther Koestler
- Most of the works of Franz Kafka
- Finnegans Wake by James Joyce
- Wake Trilogy by Lisa McMann
  - WAKE (2008)
  - FADE (2009)
  - GONE (2010)

=== Drama ===
- A Dream Play (1901) and other plays by August Strindberg during his Symbolist and Expressionist periods
- Copacabana by Barry Manilow (born 1947)

=== Film ===
- Un chien andalou (1927) by Luis Buñuel and Salvador Dalí (actually started when Buñuel and Dalí discussed their dreams, then decided to start with two of them and make a film)
- Many films by Maya Deren (1917–1961)
- Many films by David Lynch, especially Eraserhead and Mulholland Drive, contain dreamlike elements.
- Dream scenes are popular in many horror movies, notably the Nightmare on Elm Street series
- The Trial by Orson Welles (based on the novel by Franz Kafka)
- Eternal Sunshine of the Spotless Mind features around witnessing the effects of having one's memory erased through dreaming.
- The Science of Sleep (2006) by Michel Gondry
- The Cell (2000) by Tarsem Singh contains vivid and surreal imagery to convey the mind-world of a serial killer.
- The Good Night (2007) by Jake Paltrow
- The animated science fiction film Paprika (2006) by Satoshi Kon features intense dream imagery.
- Inception (2010) by Christopher Nolan contains extravagant sequences inside the dreams of people through "dream sharing". There are many sequences in 'reality' that also feature very dream-like imagery, questioning the main protagonist's state of consciousness.

=== Comics ===
- Dreams of a Rarebit Fiend (1904–1921) and Little Nemo (1905–1913) by Winsor McCay (also his animated films)
- The Sandman (DC Comics/Vertigo) by Neil Gaiman
- Many works of Milo Manara
- Dream Company, a webcomic by Moon Ji-Hyeon

== See also ==
- List of works based on dreams
- Dream diary
- Dream interpretation
- Dream world (plot device)
- Dream pop
- Fantastic art
- Psychedelic art
- Magic realism
- Shoegaze
- Video games about dreams
- DreamsID (Dreams Interpreted and Drawn)
