= Incubation (ritual) =

Sleeping in a sacred area

Incubation is the religious practice of sleeping in a sacred area with the intention of experiencing a divinely inspired dream or cure. Incubation was practised by many ancient cultures. In perhaps the most well known instance among the Hebrews, found in 1 Kings 3, Solomon went to Gibeon "because that was the most renowned high place to offer sacrifices." There "the Lord appeared to Solomon in a dream at night," and Solomon asked God for the gift of an understanding heart. Among the members of the cult of Asclepius, votive offerings found at ritual centres at Epidaurus, Pergamum, and Rome detail the perceived effectiveness of the method. Incubation was adopted by certain Christian sects and became an important ritual of Byzantine doctor saints (e.g. Saints Cosmas and Damian, Saint Artemius, Saint Cyr and John, Saint Thecla) and their related miracles became a fundamental source for Byzantine medicine and everyday life. The practice spread all over the Mediterraneaum to Western Europe and allegedly is still used in a few Greek monasteries. Modern practices for influencing dream content by dream incubation use more research-driven techniques, but sometimes they incorporate elements reflecting ancient beliefs.

A form of incubation was also used by the iatromantes of the ancient Greeks. According to Peter Kingsley, iatromantis figures belonged to a wider Greek and Asian shamanic tradition with origins in Central Asia. A main ecstatic, meditative practice of these healer-prophets was incubation (ἐγκοίμησις, enkoimesis). More than just a medical technique, incubation reportedly allowed a human being to experience a fourth state of consciousness different from sleeping, dreaming, or ordinary waking: a state that Kingsley describes as “consciousness itself” and likens to the turiya or samādhi of the Indian yogic traditions.

== History ==
=== Ancient practices ===
Dream incubation was practiced in several ancient religious traditions. In the cult of Asclepius patients slept in a designated sleeping area known as an abaton or enkoimeterion, where a healing dream was expected to provide a diagnosis or indicate a treatment.

Aristotle provides an early account of a form of dream-related incubation in Sardinia. In the Physics, while discussing the relationship between the perception of change and awareness of the passage of time, he refers to a tradition according to which people in Sardinia slept next to the tombs of heroes. Upon awakening, they were said to connect the present moment with the moment at which they had fallen asleep, failing to perceive the intervening period. Later commentators interpreted the passage as referring to a form of ritual incubation, in which people suffering from illness slept near the tombs or sanctuaries of heroic figures in the hope of receiving healing.

== See also ==
- Lucid dream
- Recurring dream
- Dream incubation
- Works based on dreams
- Yumemi Kobo – Japanese toy company
