= Air (Astronoid album) =

Studio album by Astronoid
- Released: June 6, 2016
- Genres: Post-metal; post-rock; shoegaze; progressive metal
- Length: 50:01
- Label: Blood Music
- Producers: Brett Boland; Daniel Schwartz

Astronoid chronology
Stargazer (2012)	Air (2016)	Astronoid (2019)

Air is the debut album by post-metal band Astronoid, released in 2016 by Blood Music.

== Background ==
After releasing an EP Stargazer in 2013, vocalist Brett Boland and bassist Daniel Schwartz recruited guitarists Casey Aylward and Mike DeMelia and drummer Matt St. Jean to create a full band lineup. After forming the full band, the group was signed to Blood Music.

The band was inspired by Devin Townsend, Ihsahn, and Emperor during this time.

The band released the songs "Air" and "Up and Atom" to promote the album before its release.

== Style ==
The band's label described their sound as "Dream Thrash". Noisey described the album as "a buoyant mix of metal, thrash, punk, prog-rock and shoegaze.".

Allmusic described the album's sound, stating "The terms "dream thrash" and "blackgaze" could be thrown around—and it really is an exhilarating mish-mash of everything from black metal to shoegaze to thrash and even to pop-punk." The A.V. Club described it as "a soaring sound, which marries heavenly clean vocals to a warm but still blistering blur of guitar that's like black metal on a sugar rush".

== Critical reception and sales ==
Professional ratings
Review scores
Source	Rating
AllMusic	4.5/5 stars
New Noise Magazine	4.5/5 stars
The Independent Voice	4.5/5 stars
Progressive Music Planet	8.5/10 stars
Metal Trenches	9/10 stars
It Djents	10/10 stars
Metal Temple	9/10 stars
The Prog Mind	9.5/10
Alt Dialogue	9.75/10
The Grim Tower	7/10 stars

Air received nearly universal critical acclaim upon release. Writing for AllMusic, Neil Z. Yeung gave the album 4 and a 1/2 out of 5 stars, stating "overwhelmingly powerful and cathartic, Air is an album to get lost in, a single-listen journey over emotional peaks and through sonic valleys. There is so much happening at once that descriptions make it sound like a confused exercise."

Metal Sucks described the album as "an instant classic". Angry Metal Guy gave the album a positive review, stating "Air is the kind of destined-to-be-classic that conjures a world of timeless innocence and youthful wonder. This is the soundtrack to walking on the beach alone on the first day of summer... This is the sound of being old enough to know how incredible the world can be, but young enough not to have been tainted by its negativity." It Djents called the album one of the best debuts in recent memory and one of the best records of 2016. San Diego City Beat called the album one of the best of 2016 in any genre.

In its first week, the album sold 250 physical copies. 24 hours after release, it was ranked #2 on the Bandcamp metal charts. Shortly afterwards, it climbed to #1 on the metal charts and #10 on the site overall.

== Accolades ==
Stereogum placed the album 31st on their half-way through the year rankings of the best albums of any genres through June 2016. Consequence of Sound named the album 10th on its ranking of Top 10 Metal albums of 2016. Air was placed on the "Best of 2016" as well as "Favorite Metal Album" year end lists by Allmusic. Metal Insider named it one of the top 5 metal albums of the year so far in a June column, they later ranked it third on their Top Metal Albums of 2016 list. Metal Storm named it the best debut album of 2016.

Publication	Accolade	Rank	Ref.
Stereogum	50 Best Albums of 2016 So Far (June 2016)	31	
Consequence of Sound	Top 10 Metal Albums of 2016	10	
Metal Insider	Top Metal Albums of 2016	3	
Metal Storm	Best Debut Albums of 2016	1	
Stereogum	40 Best Metal Albums of 2016	7	
LA Weekly	The Best Metal Albums of 2016	2	
Loudwire	Graham Hartmann's Top 5 Rock + Metal albums of 2016	1	
Free Williamsburg	11 Best Metal Albums of 2016	3	
Invisible Oranges	Top Albums of 2016	3	
No Clean Singing	Top 10 Albums of 2016	1	
Toilet Ov Hell	Joaquin Stick's Top 10 Albums of 2016	8	
Ghost Cult Mag	50 Best Albums of 2016	29	
Metalholic	Top 50 Hard Rock & Metal albums	39	

== Track listing ==
All tracks are written by Brett Boland and Daniel Schwartz.

Air
No.	Title	Length
1.	"Incandescent"	5:11
2.	"Up and Atom"	6:17
3.	"Resin"	6:30
4.	"Violence"	2:21
5.	"Homesick"	4:47
6.	"Tin Foil Hats"	5:09
7.	"Air"	6:09
8.	"Obsolete"	6:11
9.	"Trail of Sulfur"	7:26
Total length:		50:01

== Personnel ==
Astronoid

- Brett Boland - vocals
- Daniel Schwartz - bass
- Casey Aylward - guitar
- Mike DeMellia - guitar
- Matt St. Jean - drums

Production

- Mixed by Brett Boland & Daniel Schwartz.
- Mastered by Daniel Schwartz.
- Cover art by Lully Schwartz.
