= Alex Poole =

American multi-instrumentalist musician

Alex Poole (born October 4, 1986) is an American multi-instrumentalist musician from Nashville, Tennessee. Poole has prolifically contributed to the black metal genre, having led or contributed to a number of bands, including Chaos Moon, Manetheren, Krieg, Skáphe, Martröð, and Gardsghastr. He has also played live with a number of bands to fill in for missing guitarists or bassists over the years (e.g. Adzalaan, Benighted in Sodom, Dagger Lust, Heimnar, In Ruins, and Triumvir Foil).

== Stage names ==
Alex Poole first recorded music under Alexander during his project, Troglodytic. After that, he used Esoterica as a pseudonym up until 2012 when he began releasing music under a band with the same name. At that point, he began using A. Poole as his stage name. Still later in his career in 2016, Poole began using his initials, A.P., as a pseudonym.

== Music career ==
=== Early independent work in Nashville (2000 – 2011) ===
Poole began to independently record and release black metal in Nashville, Tennessee with his bands Troglodytic (2000 – 2004) and Coffin (2004). He recorded multiple EPs and demos between 2000 and 2004 which have a lo-fi quality and an ambient black metal style.

In 2004, Poole also started the first incarnations of Ringarë and Chaos Moon. Poole started Ringarë by playing all instruments and independently releasing an EP and a Demo. However, it wasn’t until 2019 when Swedish vocalist, Likpredikaren, joined Ringarë that they release their first full-length album, Under the Pale Moon, on Iron Bonehead Productions. Its symphonic black metal style has been compared to Dimmu Borgir, Deafheaven, and Wolves in the Throne Room.

Poole independently worked on Chaos Moon in the beginning as well. That changed in 2007 when he was joined by American vocalist, Mark Hunter, to record albums, Origin of Apparition and Languor Into Echoes, Beyond. The next big line-up change occurred a decade later in 2017 when Poole is joined by Eric Baker (vocals), Steven Blackburn (additional guitars), and Jack Blackburn (drums). Together, they released Eschaton Mémoire which achieved more notoriety than previous Chaos Moon releases. Spyros Stasis of PopMatters says, "It might have taken a while for Chaos Moon to reach this state, a surprising result considering how potent and promising the two early records of the band were. From these diamonds in the rough, Chaos Moon has further explored its sound, and with Eschaton Memoire Poole and company have reached the summit." Moreover, Jacob Buczarski of Mare Cognitum opines that Poole’s “rejection of traditional black metal tropes in favor his own signature method of building atmosphere creates an experience that manages to be both meditative and punishing simultaneously.” Regarding Eschaton Mémoire, Decibel comments, “While guitarists Alex Poole and Steven Blackburn ensorcell the din and beauty of the two-part “The Pillar, the Fall, and the Key” songs are easy rabbit holes to fall into, Eric Baker growls and squawks an end-time message that paints a very dark picture. The Philadelphians are journeymasters, able to cast off into dreamland with the quickest of turns or descend into the vantablack abyss with ease, often within the same song.”

=== Collaborations and moving to Philadelphia (2012 – 2015) ===
In 2012, Poole expanded his style with Esoterica which tended to have more Ambient music and Shoegazing components than Chaos Moon. Esoterica's first EPs, Idololatriae and Knell, were both released independently. This was followed up by their full-length album, Aseity, in 2013. On Aseity, Poole (vocals & guitars) was joined by Steven Blackburn (bass) and Jack Blackburn (drums) who would go on to become long-time collaborators with Poole.

It was about the same time Poole met Neil Jameson (vocalist of Krieg) in Pennsylvania in 2012. They collaborated on Lithotome together and had one release, Lithotome (2013), on Fall of Nature Records. Poole moved to Philadelphia shortly thereafter to join Krieg as a guitarist. In 2014, they released Transient on Candlelight Records and garnered notoriety among the Black Metal community. Regarding Transient, Grayson Haver Currin of Pitchfork noted, “It’s a full-band feat, motivated by the drums but pulled along by Alex Poole’s spectacularly assorted riffs. In the span of six minutes, he lands a perfectly slow, steely melody at the start and, near the middle, a grim, low-lying theme.” Over the years, Krieg has collaborated with a number of other metal bands – most notably producing The Body & Krieg (2015) from At a Loss Recordings and the Integrity/Krieg Split (2018) on Relapse Records.

Poole also created psychedelic black metal band, Skáphe, in 2014 and released the self-titled first album on Fallen Empire Records. The album review by James Parry-Smith of CVLT Nation states, “Within walls of atmosphere and bleaker-than-thou black metal do Skáphe craft their cavernous hell, using reverberation to invoke and catalyze sensations of claustrophobia and crushing despondency.”

During interviews about his inspiration, Poole discussed his use of hallucinogens to inspire his creativity. Regarding musical inspiration, Poole notes that Soundgarden’s album, Superunknown, was a major inspiration for his guitar work. He says, “On "Limo Wreck" the riff that begins at ~0:11, is probably my favorite single riff of all time. Its essence is easily the biggest influence for Skáphe.” Furthermore, during an interview with Eric Gallippo of Vice, Poole further describes the origin of Skáphe’s sound, “For me, it was writing something that was kind of abandoning guitar chords. Like, unlearning how to play and trying to create music based on not knowing how to create music. I wanted to explore horrible sounds but make them musical. Like, trying to get as close to absolute chaos without it losing its sensibility.”

From across the Atlantic Ocean, in one of Poole’s first major transatlantic collaborations, D.G. (Dagur Gíslason), frontman for Icelandic black metal band, Misþyrming, began contributing vocals to Skáphe. In 2016, they released Skaphe2 on Fallen Empire Records which received a positive review from Al Necro of CVLT Nation, “Deeply experimental, complex, and dissonant, Skáphe’s full-length foray into noise avant-garde black metal is the best modern black metal to have incarnated since the beginnings of black metal itself.” Scott Murphy of Heavy Blog Is Heavy describes Poole’s style, “Poole achieves this by weaving multiple BM stylings together without fancying any particular one. Thick, pummeling riffs verging on bestial black metal suddenly give way to eerie ambience that echoes in a cavernous manner.”

In 2019, H.V. Lyngdal, Icelandic vocalist from Wormlust, joined Skáphe to release Kosmískur Hryllingur (2019), which is Icelandic for “Cosmic Horror.” This album received some positive comments from Lars Gotrich of NPR who wrote, “Your mileage may vary (or be completely non-existent) when it comes to black metal made to sound like a collapsing black hole. But this collaboration understands that the darker depths of psychedelia can wield some brilliantly colored nightmares.”

=== Expanding international collaborations (2016 – Present) ===
2016 saw the creation of one of the most diverse international black metal groups: Martröð. Alex Poole (guitars) joined H.V. Lyngdal (additional guitars) from Iceland, Thorns (drums) from Italy, and MKM (vocals) from France. They released Transmutation of Wounds on Terratur Possessions Records in 2016.

The following year, Poole returned to recording with long-time collaborators, the Blackburn brothers, to form Entheogen. Entheogen was different from their previous projects in that Steven Blackburn performed all the guitar work while Poole focused only on vocals. Their album, Without Veil, nor Self, was released on Fallen Empire Records in 2017. A review from Angry Metal Guy describes the sound of Entheogen’s record the following way: “The album alternates between chaotic spasms of sound akin to Krallice and atmospheric wisps laced with half-melodies and eerie warmth.”

After hearing Icelandic band, Wormlust, Poole reached out to H.V. Lyngdal (vocalist) to form Guðveiki, which is an Icelandic word that translates to “God Disease.” Poole returned to guitar. The Blackburn brothers also contributed. They released one album, Vængför, on Fallen Empire Records in 2018. Vængför has more death metal influences than Poole’s previous releases.

In 2019, Poole (guitar and keyboards) again joined forces with the Blackburn brothers. This time, they were joined by Swedish musicians, Glomd (vocals) and Swartadauþuz (additional guitars and backing vocals) to create the experimental/symphonic black metal band, Gardsghastr. They released Slit Throat Requiem on Profound Lore Records in 2019. Regarding the album, Maxen of GRIMM comments, “On Slit Throat Requiem the dark elements are cast into the magical cauldron to form a haunting sensation. The quintet equally balance the aggression and the cold ambient surroundings. The song stretches to further soundscapes where the moonlight crescendo and the enchanting tremolo pickings dominantly allures the listener. While the nightmarish rasps conjures up the images of haunted medieval castles, the music transports you to the ghostly landscapes.” Moreover, Heaviest of Art concludes, “Slit Throat Requiem is a fantastic return to the glorious era of late nineties Symphonic Black Metal that many listeners have been clutching to for nearly two decades.”

In 2020, Poole recorded all instruments for his new occult black metal band, Haxanu. The mysterious L.C. added vocals to the record, and they released the album, Snare of All Salvation, on Amor Fati Productions. Some of the reviews have been positive such as Dutch Pierce of Decibel who says,” These days stateside black metal multi-instrumentalist Alex Poole stands as one of the world’s elite black metal magi. His uncompromising approach to creating exclusively final form black metal albums combined with his prolific output and philosophical creativity represent the pillars of his genius.” The review from Invisible Oranges notes, “Snare of All Salvation balances itself on a razor's edge, bringing duality into a monist reality: atmosphere is aggression, hostility is ambiance. Poole's mastery of black metal precedes him, with his work in Chaos Moon, Ringarë, Gardsghastr, and more acting as part of a greater thesis on the genre, and Häxanu's more vitriolic approach is yet another strong point made within Poole's oeuvre. Compared to his other works, Häxanu presents itself as a more bellicose cousin to its creator's other works -- a faster, sharper manifestation of Poole's creativity -- and yet Snare of All Salvation still nestles itself comfortably within his greater discography.”

However, the album received criticism from Dave “That Metal Guy” Campbell from Metal-Temple for being too repetitive and traditional. He noted, “Some staunch purists want to make the same music of their forefathers, while others are interested in branching out into new, uncharted territories. I am sorry to say that HAXANU falls into the former of this group, and because they have nothing to offer that hasn’t been offered before, I have to rate it the way that I did.”

== Discography ==
=== Troglodytic ===
Personnel:

- Alex Poole – All Instruments

Demos

- As Sadness Remains (2003, Independently Released)
- Anathematized (2004, Independently Released)

EP

- War and Death (2004, Independently Released)

=== Coffin ===
Personnel:

- Alex Poole – All Instruments

Demos

- Shadows of (2004, Independently Released)

EP

- Final Conflict of Nothing (2004, Independently Released)

=== Ringarë ===
Personnel:

- Alex Poole – Guitars and Keyboards
- Likpredikaren – Vocals

Demo

- Di’nguruthos Promo (2004, Independently Released)
- Where Cold Dwells and Autumn Once Lay (2019, Forgotten Centuries)
- Sorrow Befell (2020, Iron Bonehead Productions)

EP

- Promo 2006 (2006, Independently Released)

Studio Album

- Under Pale Moon (2019, Iron Bonehead Productions)

=== Chaos Moon ===
Personnel:

- Alex Poole – All Instruments except on Eschaton Mémoire.

Studio album

- Origin Of Apparition (2007, Wraith Productions)
- Languor Into Echoes, Beyond (2007, Ars Magna Recordings)
- Resurrection Extract (2014, I, Voidhanger Records)
- Eschaton Mémoire (2017, Blood Music)

EP

- The Ouroboros Worm (2011, Plastik Musik)
- Plaguebearer's Gift (2013, Independently Released)
- Amissum (2015, Hellthrasher Productions)

=== Manetheren ===
Personnel:

- Azlum – All Instruments until Thorns began playing drums in 2011
- Alex Poole – Vocals (2008 – 2011)
- Eric Baker - Vocals (2015 – present)
- Thorns (Gionata Potenti) – Drums (2011 – present)

Studio album

- Solitary Remnants (2008, Funeral Moonlight Productions)
- Time (2012, Debemur Morti Productions)
- The End (2017, Avantgarde Music)

=== Esoterica ===
Personnel:

- Alex Poole – All Instruments and Vocals except on Aseity.

EP

- Idololatriae (2012)
- Knell (2012)

Studio album

- Aseity (2013, Forever Plagued Records)

Splits

- New World Black Metal (2012, Plastik Musik) - split with Krieg / Bitter Peace / Esoterica / The Many
- To the Dream Plateau of Hideous Revelation (2013, Aurora Australis Records) - split with Ævangelist / Esoterica

=== Ars Hmu ===
Personnel:

- Alex Poole – bass
- Likpredikaren – Vocals
- Swartadauþuz – Guitars

Demo

- The Dawn of Black Pansophy (2012, Purity Through Fire)

=== Krieg ===
(See Krieg for full discography)

Personnel:

- Alex Poole – Guitars
- Shawn Riley – Guitars
- Bill Durrant – Bass
- Jason Dost – Drums
- Neil Jameson – Vocals

Studio album

- Transient (2014, Candlelight Records)
- A Small Death: Sessions 2003 (2017, Children of the Night Records)

Collaboration/Split

- The Body & Krieg (2015, At A Loss Recordings)
- Integrity/Krieg (2018, Relapse Records)

=== Lithotome ===
Personnel:

- Alex Poole - Guitars
- N. Imperial – Vocals
- Nathan Kite (The Many) – Keyboards/Ambience/Sampling
- Steven Blackburn – Bass
- Jack Blackburn – Drums

Studio album

- Lithotome (2013, Fall of Nature Records)

=== Skáphe ===
Personnel:

- Alex Poole – Guitars
- Jack Blackburn – Drums
- D.G. (Dagur Gíslason) – Vocals

Studio album

- Skáphe (2014, Fallen Empire Records)
- Skaphe^{2} (2016, Fallen Empire Records)
- Skaphe^{3} (2020, Mystiskaos Records)

Collaboration

- Kosmískur hryllingur (2019, Mystiskaos Records) - Collaboration between Skáphe (Alex Poole & Dagur Gíslason) and Wormlust (H.V Lyngdal)

=== Martröð ===
Personnel:

- Alex Poole – Guitars

EP

- Transmutation of Wounds (2016, Terratur Possessions Records)

=== Entheogen ===
Personnel:

- Alex Poole - Vocals

Studio album

- Without Veil, nor Self (2017, Fallen Empire Records)

=== Guðveiki ===
Personnel:

- Alex Poole - Guitars and Keyboards

Studio album

- Vængför (2018, Fallen Empire Records)

=== Gardsghastr ===
Personnel:

- Alex Poole – Guitars and Keyboards

Studio album

- Slit Throat Requiem (2019, Profound Lore Records)

=== Haxanu ===
Personnel:

- Alex Poole – All Instruments

Studio album

- Snare of All Salvation (2020, Amor Fati Productions)
