= Astronoid (album) =

Studio album by Astronoid
- Released: February 1, 2019
- Genres: Blackgaze; post-metal; progressive pop; progressive rock; pop punk
- Length: 47:34
- Label: Blood Music

Astronoid chronology
Air (2016)	Astronoid (2019)	Radiant Bloom (2022)

Singles from Astronoid
- 1. "I Dream in Lines" Released: November 27, 2018; 2. "A New Color" Released: January 11, 2019

Astronoid is the second studio album by post-metal band Astronoid, released in 2019 by Blood Music.

== Background ==
Astronoid's previous album Air, was a critical success, landing on several year end best of lists. After the band finished touring, they began working on their second album.

The album was announced in November 2018, with "I Dream in Lines" serving as the lead single. The album's second single, "A New Color", was released on January 11, 2019. Vocalist/guitarist Brett Boland said the following about the album "...encapsulates all the changes in our lives over the past couple of years. Astronoid is a testament to who we are as people, the music that consumes us, and the love in our lives. These songs hold a special place in our hearts and we hope that others can find the same solace in them that we have.”

The group toured in support of Between the Buried and Me and TesseracT to promote the album.

== Reception ==
Professional ratings
Review scores
Source	Rating
AllMusic	4/5 stars
Distorted Sound	8/10
Ghost Cult	9/10
MetalSucks	4/5 stars
New Noise Magazine	4.5/5 stars
Pitchfork	5.2/10

The album's vocal work drew several comparisons to the band Circa Survive. In a mid-year lookback, Loudwire named the album one of the best rock albums of 2019.

== Track listing ==
All tracks are written by Brett Boland and Daniel Schwartz.

Astronoid
No.	Title	Length
1.	"A New Color"	5:21
2.	"I Dream in Lines"	4:51
3.	"Lost"	6:20
4.	"Fault"	5:34
5.	"Breathe"	3:46
6.	"Water"	5:34
7.	"I Wish I Was There While the Sun Set"	5:30
8.	"Beyond the Scope"	5:56
9.	"Ideal World"	4:47
Total length:		47:34

== Personnel ==
Astronoid

- Brett Boland - vocals, guitars, drums
- Daniel Schwartz - bass, synthesizers
- Casey Aylward - guitar
- Mike DeMellia - guitar

Production

- Mixed by Brett Boland & Daniel Schwartz.
- Mastered by Magnus Lindberg
