= Dynatron =

Dynatron can refer to:

- Dynatron oscillator, type of vacuum tube electronic oscillator circuit
- Dynatron Radio Ltd, British electronics company (1927-55)
- Dynatron (music producer), Danish music producer
