= Iatromantis =

Greek term

Iatromantis is a Greek word whose literal meaning is most simply rendered "physician-seer." The iatromantis, a form of Greek "shaman", is related to other semimythical figures such as Abaris, Aristeas, Epimenides, and Hermotimus. In the classical period, Aeschylus uses the word to refer to Apollo and to Asclepius, Apollo's son.

According to Peter Kingsley, iatromantis figures belonged to a wider Greek and Asian shamanic tradition with origins in Central Asia. A main ecstatic, meditative practice of these healer-prophets was incubation (ἐγκοίμησις, enkoimesis). More than just a medical technique, incubation reportedly allowed a human being to experience a fourth state of consciousness different from sleeping, dreaming, or ordinary waking: a state that Kingsley describes as “consciousness itself” and likens to the turiya or samādhi of the Indian yogic traditions. Kingsley identifies the Greek pre-Socratic philosopher Parmenides as an iatromantis. This identification has been described by Oxford academic Mitchell Miller as "fascinating" but also as "very difficult to assess as a truth claim".
