= Maudlin of the Well =

American avant-garde metal band

- Origin: Boston, Massachusetts, U.S.
- Genres: Avant-garde metal; progressive metal
- Years active: 1996–2003; 2008–2012; 2015; 2026–present
- Labels: Dark Symphonies, Blood Music
- Past members: Jason Byron; Toby Driver; Greg Massi; Maria-Stella Fountoulakis; Josh Seipp-Williams; Jason Bitner; Terran Olson; Sam Gutterman; Nicholas Kyte; Andrew Dickson

Maudlin of the Well (stylized as maudlin of the Well; commonly abbreviated as motW) is an avant-garde metal band from Boston, Massachusetts. Their music contains elements from many different genres including progressive rock, psychedelic rock, post rock, art rock, progressive metal, doom metal, death metal, and gothic metal, as well as chamber music, ambient music and electronic music. After a five-year hiatus, the band re-united to record their latest album, Part the Second, which was funded by fan donations and released online May 14, 2009 for free.

== History ==
Maudlin of the Well released three full-length albums before disbanding in 2003. These albums included 1999's My Fruit PsychoBells...A Seed Combustible and 2001's Bath and Leaving Your Body Map, these last two made as complementary companion albums. The band had a consistent core membership, which consisted of Jason Byron, Greg Massi, and Toby Driver. Throughout its career a sort of "revolving door" of members and session musicians participated as needed.

Maudlin's music, lyrics, and atmosphere dealt predominantly with the subject of astral projection. The band described their approach as trying to find music rather than compose it. This was done through practicing astral projection and lucid dreams, from which they were purportedly able to "bring back" pre-existing music from the astral plane (as stated by Toby Driver in the liner notes included with the reissued Bath and Leaving Your Body Map).

In late 2001, the band began working on a fourth studio album. During this time, the band lost several longtime members, changed labels, and ultimately renamed themselves to Kayo Dot. This fourth album was later released in 2003 as Kayo Dot's Choirs of the Eye.

The Dark Symphonies label re-issued Bath and Leaving Your Body Map in 2006 and My Fruit PsychoBells...A Seed Combustible in 2008, all with bonus tracks consisting of early demos.

On June 20, 2008, Toby Driver published a blog post, explaining that he had unreleased motW material on his mind and was considering giving community-funding a try in order to have it materialize as a free to download, digital-only release. Driver questioned whether this could be done considering the high cost of production and mastering and the band's relatively small following. On the band's MySpace page on July 27, 2008, as well as Driver's blog, it was announced that Dubé's donation allowed them to record a new full-length album, while further fan donations would be going towards hiring orchestral musicians and a possible physical release. According to Driver, only two songs at the time could be considered "100% old motW material", but he would work with "a dozen worthwhile fragments" and expand upon them, with the end result being, in Driver's words, "a hybrid of two different eras of my compositional mind".

Recording for the new album started on February 10, 2009, and the album, titled Part the Second was finally released in May 2009. It is available for free download in various file formats (MP3, FLAC and WAV) on motW's website, torrent networks, or alternatively, it can be streamed directly from the site. An amalgam of many different musical styles, the new songs share an ethereal quality with previous motW recordings, but are distinctly more mellow than the group's prior releases and contain no death growls.

The Finnish label Blood Music later ran a limited CD pressing of Part the Second, as well as further small runs of the band's previous albums, in 2012. The project has remained inactive since then with the exception of a reunion show in August 2015 at The Stone in New York City, announced by Greg Massi in his podcast on January 2, 2015, as part of a several day celebration of Toby Driver's career.

In February 2026, Toby Driver announced a new album Kickstarter, in honor of their 30th anniversary.

== Discography ==
=== Demos ===
- Through Languid Veins - 1996
- Sacred Spaces: Second demo, January 1997 - 1997
- Begat of the Haunted Oak: An Acorn - 1997
- Odes to Darksome Spring - 1997
- For My Wife - 1998

=== Albums ===
- My Fruit Psychobells...A Seed Combustible (1999)
- Bath (2001)
- Leaving Your Body Map (2001)
- Part the Second (2009)

=== Compilations ===
- The Complete Works (2012)

== See also ==
- Kayo Dot
