= Age of Aquarius (Perturbator album) =

Studio album by Perturbator
- Released: 10 October 2025
- Studio: Perturbator's home studio; Studio Saint Marthe
- Length: 59:32
- Label: Nuclear Blast
- Producer: James Kent

Perturbator chronology
Lustful Sacraments (2021)	Age of Aquarius (2025)

Singles from Age of Aquarius
- 1. "The Art of War" Released: 28 April 2025; 2. "Apocalypse Now" Released: 28 June 2025

Age of Aquarius is the sixth studio album by French synthwave musician Perturbator. It was released on 10 October 2025, via Nuclear Blast Records in LP, CD and digital formats. It was preceded by the singles, "The Art of War" and "Apocalypse Now".

== Background ==
Lead vocalist James Kent commented that the album consists of two parts representing "conflict" and "individualism", stating "The understanding that group-thinking leads to nowhere and having your own free will is the single most essential thing we have in life."

The lead single of the album, "The Art of War", was released on 28 April 2025. Kent described it as "about our propensity to make everything a spectacle and how we consume acts of violence as entertainment." It was followed by the second single "Apocalypse Now" on 28 June 2025, featuring Norwegian experimental band Ulver, alongside a music video directed by David Fitt.

== Reception ==
Professional ratings
Review scores
Source	Rating
Blabbermouth	7.5/10
Kerrang!	4/5
Metal Hammer	7/10
Rock Hard	8.0/10

Rating the album seven out of ten in his review for Metal Hammer, Matt Mills remarked, "At the core of each of these 11 songs is a cracking idea, and the vast majority fulfil their potential." Patrick Olbrich of Metal.de noted it as "a cinematic dark electric work that once again offers more industrial elements", describing it as "stronger" than Perturbator's 2021 EP, New Model.

In a 8.0 rating for Rock Hard, Thorsten Dörting described "Apocalypse Now" as "sarcastic", "Venus" as "wavy", "The Swimming Pool" as a "pianosque counter-ballad" and "The Art of War" as "dark" and "dystopian", opining "when he hits hard and fast, he lands the most effective hits on his sixth album, the synth-tinkerer reaches out wide, stylistically."

The album received a rating of 7.5 from Blabbermouth's Dom Lawson, who remarked, "At its best, this is an imperious display of originality and ingenuity. And even at its worst, this is still the unofficial soundtrack for our brightly lit and brutal future." Olly Thomas of Kerrang! assigned it a rating of four, noting it as "a seamless, looming whole" of "industrial, post-punk and electronica."

== Track listing ==
All tracks are written by James Kent.

Age of Aquarius track listing
No.	Title	Length
1.	"Apocalypse Now" (featuring Ulver)	6:00
2.	"Lunacy"	4:50
3.	"Venus" (featuring Author & Punisher)	5:48
4.	"The Glass Staircase"	5:15
5.	"Hangover Square"	3:08
6.	"The Art of War"	3:39
7.	"12th House"	4:56
8.	"Lady Moon" (featuring Greta Link)	6:55
9.	"The Swimming Pool"	3:35
10.	"Mors Ultima Ratio"	5:07
11.	"Age of Aquarius" (featuring Alcest)	10:19
Total length:		59:32

== Personnel ==
Credits adapted from the album's liner notes.

- James Kent – production, mixing, mastering, artwork layout, synthesizers, drum programming, guitars, bass, backing vocals
- Jaime Gomez Arellano – mastering
- Andy Julia – artwork photos
- Mathias Leonard – pentagram logo
- Metastazis – artwork layout
- Ulver – main vocals on "Apocalypse Now"
- Author & Punisher – main vocals on "Venus"
- Greta Link – main vocals on "Lady Moon"
- Alcest – main vocals on "Age of Aquarius"

== Charts ==
Chart performance for Age of Aquarius
Chart (2025)	Peak position
French Physical Albums (SNEP)	112
French Rock & Metal Albums (SNEP)	27
UK Dance Albums (OCC)	11
UK Independent Albums Breakers (OCC)	17
