= Leaving Your Body Map =

Studio album by maudlin of the Well
- Released: August 31, 2001
- Genre: Avant-garde metal; progressive metal
- Length: 61:00
- Label: Dark Symphonies / Blood Music

Maudlin of the Well chronology
Bath (2001)	Leaving Your Body Map (2001)	Part the Second (2009)

Professional ratings
Review scores
Source	Rating
Sputnikmusic	link

Leaving Your Body Map is the third studio album recorded by the American avant-garde metal band maudlin of the Well. It was released on August 31, 2001 by Dark Symphonies, alongside its companion album Bath.

== Background ==
Leaving Your Body Map and its sister album are a combination of older demo material written as far back as 1997 in rearranged and re-orchestrated forms and new material, all recorded simultaneously to achieve consistency; to this end, the series of instrumental interludes, all composed purportedly in lucid dreams, are sequenced in order of appearance across both albums. Each album features cover art befitting the title of its counterpart, with Bath featuring a map to a bath tub and window in yellow, and Leaving Your Body Map featuring the tub and window in red. The band inserted clues to a hidden secret in the liner notes of the albums through a series of complex symbols; to aid listeners, they recorded and released "The Secret Song" on an MCD in 2001, with lyrics purported to explain how to unlock the hidden message. While the puzzle was solved in 2020, the solution was only officially confirmed in 2025.

Both albums were reissued on Dark Symphonies with bonus tracks in 2005-2006. Blood Music reissued them again in 2012 for the first time on vinyl, including a box set for the companion albums, and later "The Secret Song" MCD and a CD box set of the band's discography.

== Track listing ==
No.	Title	Length
1.	"Stones of October's Sobbing"	7:25
2.	"Gleam in Ranks"	4:16
3.	"Bizarre Flowers / A Violent Mist"	9:35
4.	"Interlude 3"	4:18
5.	"The Curve That to an Angle Turn'd"	8:22
6.	"Sleep Is a Curse"	5:37
7.	"Riseth He, the Numberless 1"	4:18
8.	"Riseth He, the Numberless 2"	5:12
9.	"Interlude 4"	5:10
10.	"Monstrously Low Tide"	6:47
Total length:		61:00

Dark Symphonies 2005 re-release
No.	Title	Length
11.	"The Secret Song"	6:50
12.	"The Painting of Mu Principle"	4:13
Total length:		72:03

Blood Music 2012 re-release
No.	Title	Length
11.	"Banquet of Dis (1997 version of "Riseth He, the Numberless")"	8:50
Total length:		69:50

== Personnel ==
- Jason Byron - vocals/keyboards
- Toby Driver - vocals/guitars/bass
- Maria-Stella Fountoulakis - vocals
- Greg Massi - vocals/guitars
- Josh Seipp-Williams - guitars
- Jason Bitner - trumpet
- Terran Olson - vocals/clarinet/flute
- Sam Gutterman - drums/vocals
- Sky Cooper - guitars on "Monstrously Low Tide"
- Anna Wetherby - viola
