= Dream incubation =

Thought technique aiming for a specific dream topic

Dream incubation is a thought technique which aims for a specific dream topic to occur, either for recreation or to attempt to solve a problem. For example, a person might go to bed repeating to themselves that they will dream about a presentation they have coming up, or a vacation they recently took. While somewhat similar to lucid dreaming, dream incubation is simply focusing attention on a specific issue when going to sleep.

== History ==
=== Ancient practices ===
Dream incubation has ancient precedents in religious practices in which people slept at sacred sites in the expectation of receiving healing or divinely inspired dreams, particularly in the Greek and Roman worlds. Aristotle also mentions a Sardinian tradition of sleeping "beside the heroes" in Physics.

=== Modern research ===
In a study at Harvard Medical School, Dr. Deirdre Barrett had her students focus on a problem, such as an unsolved homework assignment or other objective problem, before going to sleep each night for a week. She found that it was possible to come up with novel solutions in dreams that were both satisfactory to the dreamer and rated as objectively solving the problem by an outside observer. In her study, two-thirds of participants had dreams that addressed their chosen problem and one-third reached some form of solution within their dreams. Other studies have found this type of bedtime dream incubation effective in solving problems of a more subjective, personal nature. In Barrett's book, The Committee of Sleep, she describes her study of prominent artists and scientists who draw inspiration from their dreams. While most of these dreams occurred spontaneously, a small proportion of the respondents had discovered informal versions of dream incubation on their own. They reported giving themselves successful pre-sleep suggestions for everything from seeing finished artwork in their dreams to developing plots or characters for a novel to asking dreams to solve computing and mechanical design problems.

A 2010 article in Scientific American quotes Barrett summarizing a few of the incubations techniques from The Committee of Sleep as follows:

If you want to problem-solve in a dream, you should first of all think of the problem before bed, and if it lends itself to an image, hold it in your mind and let it be the last thing in your mind before falling asleep. For extra credit, assemble something on your bedside table that makes an image of the problem. If it's a personal problem, it might be the person you have the conflict with. If you're an artist, it might be a blank canvas. If you're a scientist, the device you're working on that's half assembled or a mathematical proof you've been writing through versions of.

Equally important, don't jump out of bed when you wake up—almost half of dream content is lost if you get distracted. Lie there, don't do anything else. If you don't recall a dream immediately, see if you feel a particular emotion—the whole dream would come flooding back.

If you're just trying to dream about an issue or you want to dream of a person who's deceased or you haven't seen in a long time, you'd use very similar bedtime incubation suggestions as you would for problem solving: a concise verbal statement of what you want to dream about or a visual image of it to look at. Very often it's a person someone wants to dream of, and just a simple photo is an ideal trigger. If you used to have flying dreams and you haven't had one in a long time and you miss them, find a photo of a human flying.

== See also ==
- Lucid dream
- Recurring dream
- Works based on dreams
