= Chaos Moon =

American black metal band

- Origin: Nashville, Tennessee, U.S.
- Genres: black metal; heavy metal
- Years active: 2004-present
- Label: Blood Music

Chaos Moon is an American black metal band formed by Alex Poole in 2004. It started out as a one-man Funeral Doom project in Nashville, Tennessee. Their first full album, Origin Of Apparition, was released in 2007. In the beginning, Alex Poole was responsible for playing every instrument. However, as the years passed, other members joined including Eric Baker on vocals, Steven Blackburn on guitars, and Jack Blackburn on drums.

Their best-reviewed album to date is Eschaton Mémoire (2017) which Spyros Stasis of PopMatters says, "It might have taken a while for Chaos Moon to reach this state, a surprising result considering how potent and promising the two early records of the band were. From these diamonds in the rough, Chaos Moon has further explored its sound, and with Eschaton Memoire Poole and company have reached the summit."

== Discography ==
=== Studio album ===
- Origin Of Apparition (2007) - Released on Wraith Productions
- Languor Into Echoes, Beyond (2007) - Released on Ars Magna Recordings
- Resurrection Extract (2014) - Released on I, Voidhanger Records
- Eschaton Mémoire (2017) - Released on Blood Music

=== EP ===
- The Ouroboros Worm (2011) - Released on Plastik Musik
- Plaguebearer's Gift (2013)
- Amissum (2015) - Released on Hellthrasher Productions

== Members ==
- Alex Poole – guitar
- Eric Baker - vocals
- Steven Blackburn – guitar
- Jack Blackburn – drums
