= Part the Second =

Studio album by maudlin of the Well
- Released: May 14, 2009
- Genres: Progressive rock; art rock
- Length: 44:33
- Labels: Self-released; Antithetic
- Producer: Toby Driver

Maudlin of the Well chronology
Leaving Your Body Map (2001)	Part the Second (2009)

Professional ratings
Review scores
Source	Rating
Sputnikmusic	4/5 stars

Part the Second is maudlin of the Well's fourth and most recent album. It was funded by donations from fans, and released for free on the internet in three formats, including a FLAC-encoded 24-bit version. The fans who donated prior to the album's release are credited as executive producers.

In September 2010, the album was released as a limited-edition colored vinyl LP by Antithetic Records, and on CD by Blood Music in 2012.

== Track listing ==
All lyrics are written by Jason Byron and Toby Driver; all music is composed by maudlin of the Well.

No.	Title	Length
1.	"An Excerpt from 6,000,000,000,000 Miles Before the First, or, The Revisitation of the Blue Ghost"	10:55
2.	"Another Excerpt: Keep Light Near You, Even When Dying"	6:00
3.	"Rose Quartz Turning to Glass"	7:30
4.	"Clover Garland Island"	8:18
5.	"Laboratories of the Invisible World (Rollerskating the Cosmic Palmistric Postborder)"	11:50
Total length:		44:33

== Personnel ==
- Toby Driver – guitar, baritone guitar, bass guitar, vocals
- Sam Gutterman – drums, bass guitar, other percussion
- Terran Olson – flute, alto and baritone saxophone, piano, organ, synths
- Greg Massi – guitar
- Josh Seipp-Williams – guitar

== Guest musicians ==
- Mia Matsumiya – violin
- David Bodie – orchestral percussion, hand claps
- Madeleine Craw – cello
- Jim Fogarty – "hammond elbow"
