= Dynatron (music producer) =

Danish music producer (born 1980)

- Born: Jeppe Hasseriis; 26 December 1980 (age 45); Assens, Denmark
- Genres: Electronic; synthwave; spacesynth
- Years active: 2012-present
- Label: Blood Music
- Website: dynatronsynth.com

Jeppe Hasseriis (born 26 December 1980), known under the alias Dynatron, is an electronic and synthwave music producer from Denmark. He started making his own music in 2012. His works are heavily inspired by movies such as Alien and Blade Runner, composer Jean Michel-Jarre, 80s rock music genre and science fiction.

== History ==
In 2012, Dynatron released his first ever tracks on online audio distribution platform SoundCloud in the autumn. Fireburner was the first EP he ever released on September 8. Then later on November 22, he released his first studio album entitled Escape Velocity under the label Aphasia Records. Second EP with the title Flashbacks was released on May 5 in the year of 2013. In 2014 the movie Cold in July started screening in USA cinemas and featured his track "Cosmo Black" from the first EP. Throttle Up was released by Rad Rush Records on September 25.

Dynatron released his second studio album Aeternus on September 4, 2015, for the second time under Aphasia Records. The album was very well received and highly rated among critics and fandom alike. The YouTube network and record label NewRetroWave, which is dedicated to promoting the best artists in the emerging synthwave genre, described it with labels such as "meticulous", "masterpiece" and "cinematic".

In 2016, he signed a record contract with the Finnish label Blood Music, which also releases works from major artists like Perturbator, Dan Terminus, and GosT. He first performed live in France, Finland and Hungary the same year. The fourth EP with the title The Rigel Axiom was released under the Blood Music label on November 4. Two compilation albums entitled The Legacy Collection, Vol. I and The Legacy Collection, Vol. II was released on December 20 again under the label Blood Music. Since then, Dynatron has been working on his third studio album while having live concerts across Europe with artists like College, Christine and Daniel Deluxe.

== Discography ==
=== Studio albums ===
| Year | Title | Release date | Label |
|---|---|---|---|
| 2012 | Escape Velocity | November 12, 2012 | Aphasia Records |
| 2015 | Aeternus | September 4, 2015 | Aphasia Records |
| 2021 | Origins | October 15, 2021 | Blood Music |

=== Extended plays ===
| Year | Title | Release date | Label |
|---|---|---|---|
| 2012 | Fireburner | September 8, 2012 | Aphasia Records |
| 2013 | Flashbacks | May 10, 2013 | Aphasia Records |
| 2014 | Throttle Up | September 25, 2014 | Rad Rush Records |
| 2016 | The Rigel Axiom | November 4, 2016 | Blood Music |

=== Compilation albums ===
| Year | Title | Release date | Label |
|---|---|---|---|
| 2016 | The Legacy Collection, Vol I | December 20, 2016 | Blood Music |
| 2016 | The Legacy Collection, Vol II | December 20, 2016 | Blood Music |

=== Soundtracks ===
| Year | Title | Director | Song |
|---|---|---|---|
| 2014 | Cold in July | Jim Mickle | "Cosmo Black" |
