= Peter Kingsley =

British philosophy author (born 1953)

- Born: 1953 (age 72–73)
- Occupations: Mystic, philosopher, scholar, and author
- Years active: 1990–present
- Known for: Pre-Socratic philosophy (Parmenides and Empedocles)
- Website: Official website

Peter Kingsley (born 1953) is a mystic, philosopher, and scholar. He is the author of seven books and numerous articles, including Ancient Philosophy, Mystery and Magic; In the Dark Places of Wisdom; Reality; A Story Waiting to Pierce You: Mongolia, Tibet and the Destiny of the Western World; Catafalque: Carl Jung and the End of Humanity; A Book of Life; and The Watching Words. He has written extensively on the pre-Socratic philosophers Parmenides and Empedocles and the world they lived in.

Kingsley’s books have been translated into over a dozen languages including simplified Chinese (Beijing) and traditional Chinese (Taipei), Dutch, Farsi, French, German, Greek, Hungarian, Italian, Portuguese, Russian, Slovak, Spanish and Turkish.

== Biography ==
Peter Kingsley attended Highgate School, in north London, until 1971. He graduated with honours from the University of Lancaster in 1975, and went on to receive the degree of Master of Letters from the University of Cambridge after study at King's College; subsequently, he was awarded a PhD in classics by the University of London for his research under the guidance of Martin West. A former Fellow of the Warburg Institute in London, Kingsley has been made an honorary professor both at Simon Fraser University in Canada and at the University of New Mexico. He has lectured widely in North America and Europe. Kingsley has noted in public interviews that he is sometimes misunderstood as a scholar who gradually moved away from academic objectivity to a personal involvement with his subject matter. However, Kingsley himself has stated that he is, and always has been, a mystic, and that his spiritual experience stands in the background of his entire career, not just his most recent work.

== Major themes ==
Kingsley's work argues that the writings of the presocratic philosophers Parmenides and Empedocles, usually seen as rational or scientific enterprises, were in fact expressions of a wider Greek mystical tradition that helped give rise to western philosophy and civilisation. This tradition, according to Kingsley, was a way of life leading to the direct experience of reality and the recognition of one's divinity. Yet, as Kingsley stresses, this was no "otherworldly" mysticism: its chief figures were also lawgivers, diplomats, physicians, and even military men. The texts produced by this tradition are seamless fabrics of what later thought would distinguish as the separate areas of mysticism, science, healing, and art.

Parmenides, most famous as the "father of western logic" and traditionally viewed as a rationalist, was a priest of Apollo and iatromantis (lit. healer-prophet). Empedocles, who outlined an elaborate cosmology that introduced the enormously influential idea of the four elements into western philosophy and science, was a mystic and a magician. Kingsley reads the poems of Parmenides and Empedocles as esoteric, initiatory texts designed to lead the reader to a direct experience of the oneness of reality and the realisation of his or her own divinity. A significant implication of this reading is that western logic and science originally had a deeply spiritual purpose.

Kingsley's reading of early Greek philosophy and, in particular, of Parmenides and Empedocles, is at odds with most of the established interpretations. However, Kingsley agrees with other recent critics in contending that later ancient philosophers such as Plato, Aristotle, and Theophrastus, among others, misinterpreted and distorted their predecessors; hence, conventional scholarship that uncritically accepts their misrepresentations of the presocratics is necessarily flawed. Kingsley's procedure is to read presocratic texts in historical and geographical context, giving particular attention to the Southern Italian and Sicilian backgrounds of Parmenides and Empedocles. Additionally, he reads the poems of Parmenides and Empedocles as esoteric and mystical texts, a hermeneutical perspective that, according to Kingsley, is both indicated by the textual and historical evidence and also provides the only way to solve many problems of interpretation and text criticism. Kingsley argues that esoteric texts designed to record or induce mystical experiences can never be understood from an "outsider's perspective"; understanding must come from a reader's lived experience—or not at all.

== Parmenides and Empedocles ==
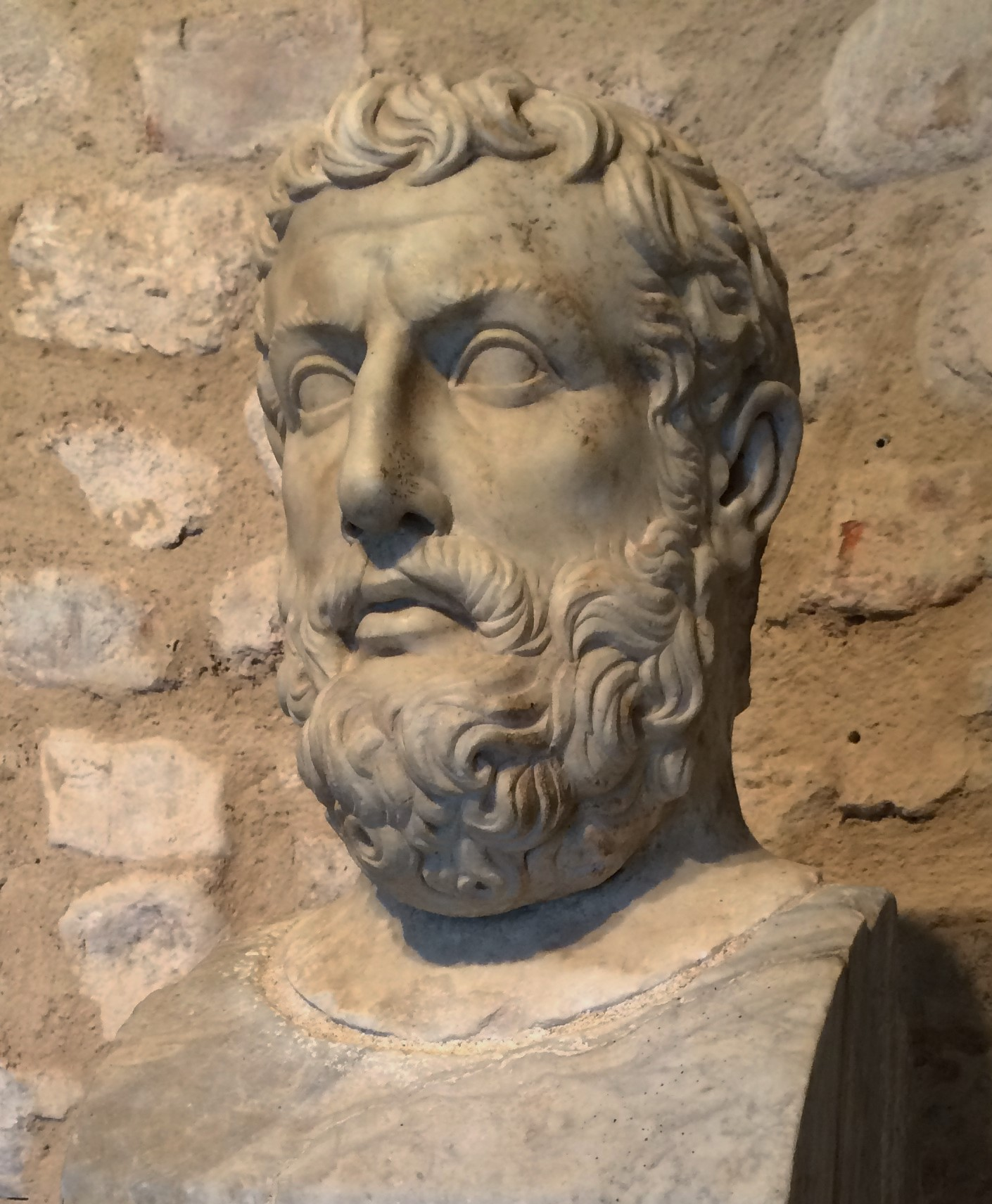
Parmenides

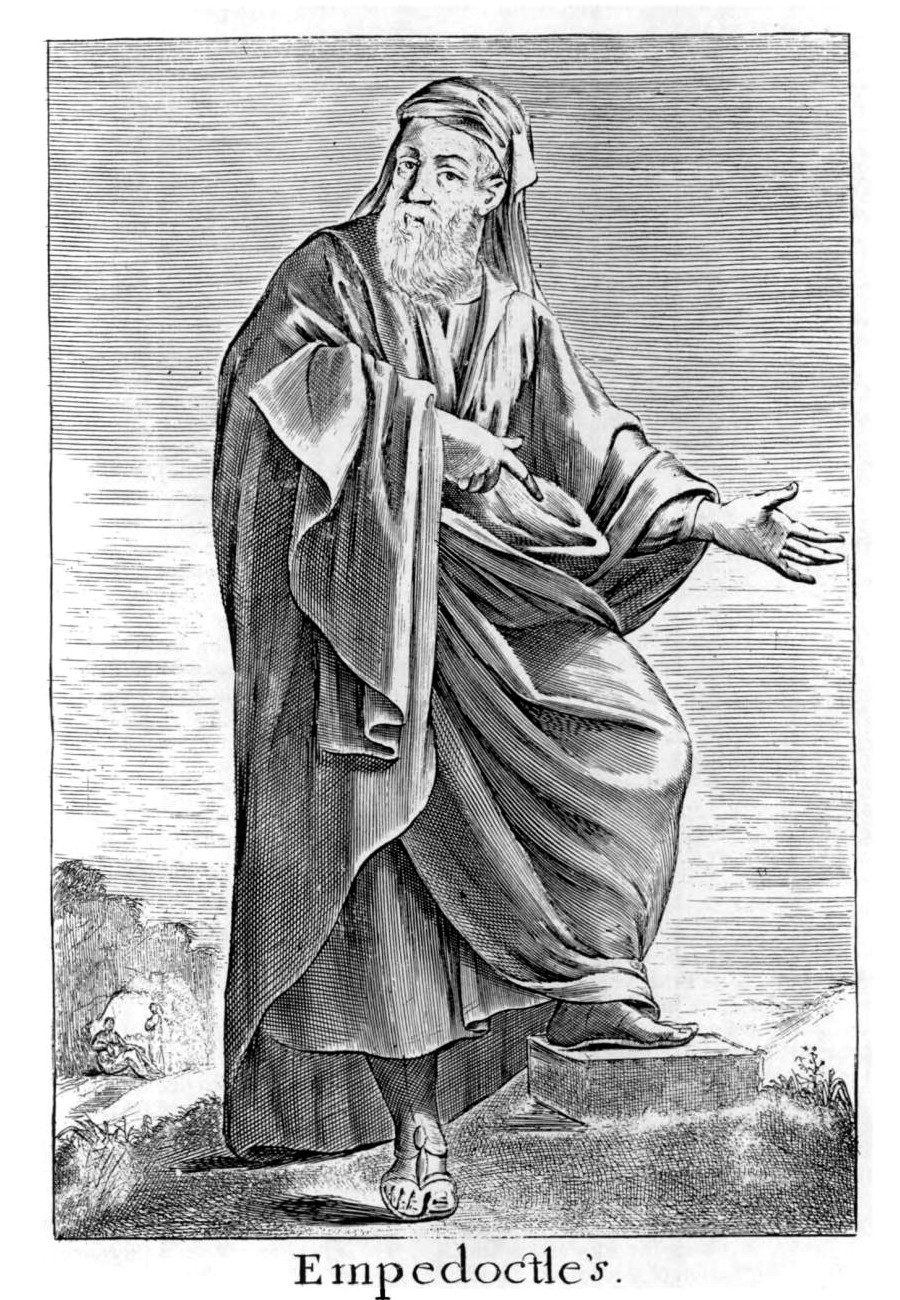
Empedocles in Thomas Stanley History of Philosophy.

Kingsley presents Parmenides and Empedocles as representatives of a mystical tradition that helped give rise to western philosophy and civilisation and that is still available to people today. Kingsley argues that this tradition is of profound importance and has something essential to offer, both inside the world of academic philosophy and beyond in the wider, contemporary West. Though Parmenides and Empedocles are often viewed as philosophical antagonists, Kingsley argues that beneath the superficial or apparent differences, the two men are profoundly united by the common essence of this one tradition, a connection that finds expression in their intimately connected understandings of reality, the body and the senses, language, death, and divine consciousness.

Parmenides and Empedocles are united by, among other things, a somewhat unorthodox mysticism with respect to the body and the senses. Empedocles' cosmology, both born out of and directed towards mystical experience, deeply influences the peculiarities of the spiritual path as he offered it. Empedocles described a cosmic cycle consisting of the uniting and separation of the four divine "roots," or elements, of earth, aithêr or air, fire, and water. The divine power of Love (at times simply called Aphrodite), in Empedocles' cosmology, brought the elements together into one, while the divine power of Strife separated them out from each other. For Empedocles, then, there is nothing in the cosmos that is not divine. Thus, there is nothing to "leave behind" as one travels the spiritual path. His mysticism is not what one might anticipate—the ascetic strain of shutting out the senses or dissociation from the body. While many forms of mysticism reject and renounce the supposed crudity of matter and the senses for something higher or loftier, Empedocles does not. Instead, he teaches the conscious use of the senses themselves as a path to recognising the divine in everything—including oneself. Similarly, Kingsley argues that the imagery and wording of the proem, or introductory part, of Parmenides' poem record an initiate's descent to the underworld and indicate a mystical background connected to the ancient practice of healing and meditation known as incubation.

More than just a medical technique, incubation was said to allow a human being to experience a fourth state of consciousness different from sleeping, dreaming, or ordinary waking: a state that Kingsley describes as "consciousness itself" and likens to the turiya or samadhi of the Indian yogic traditions. Kingsley supports this reading of the proem with the archaeological evidence from the excavations of Parmenides' hometown of Velia, or Elea, in Southern Italy. This evidence, according to Kingsley, demonstrates that Parmenides was a practising priest of Apollo, and would therefore have used incubatory techniques as a matter of course for healing, prophecy, and meditation. As Kingsley notes, this physical evidence from Velia merely conforms to and confirms the incubatory context already suggested by the proem itself. In Kingsley's understanding of this mystical tradition, the descent to the underworld is deeply connected with the conscious experience of the body—it is, in reality, a conscious descent into the depths and darkness of the very sensation of the physical body. Thus, in contrast to mystical paths that hope to "transcend" the physical, embodied state, Parmenides and Empedocles both find the divine in and through the body and the senses.

The deep sympathy between the teachings of Parmenides and Empedocles is also found in the central, logical part of Parmenides' poem, often referred to as "Fragment Eight" or "The Way of Truth." As Kingsley notes, Parmenides' logic aims at demonstrating that reality is changeless, whole, unborn and immortal, and one—a description strikingly similar to the ways in which absolute reality is described in many mystical traditions, such as Advaita Vedanta, Zen, Dzogchen, and some schools of Sufism. That this is no mere material or metaphysical monism is indicated by the initiatory motifs of the proem; the setting and hymnal language of "Fragment Eight"; the unnamed goddess as the speaker of these words; and the figure of the historical Parmenides as priest of Apollo. Kingsley reads Parmenides as saying that this "ultimate reality" is not on some supercelestial plane, but rather is very simply the reality of the world all around us. We live in an unborn and deathless world of oneness, wholeness, and changelessness—but we are unable to recognise it because mortal perception itself is dualistic. Thus, as in Empedocles, everything in Parmenides' cosmos is divine—and, importantly, the divine is not "somewhere else," but rather, right here and now.

Language, too, plays a crucial role in the teachings of Parmenides and Empedocles, and there are deep affinities here as well. Parmenides' nameless goddess consistently mimics those mortal habits of duality responsible for our imperfect perception of reality in her elenchos, or spoken demonstration, caricaturing the "twin-headed" mortals to whom she is speaking, using divine logic to reveal unity. Thus, the "truth" of "Fragment Eight" is distinctly paradoxical and reflects the apparent duality and paradox of undivided reality. The goddess' cunning use of language, humour, and paradox to undermine what she calls "mortal opinion" and establish reality indicates the fundamental importance of the word in Parmenides' teaching. When Empedocles continues the line in his poetry, the same profound importance accorded to the word in Parmenides is very much in evidence. Empedocles tells his disciple that his words are actually living things with consciousness and will. His words are esoteric seeds that must be planted in the earth of the body and tended with good will, purity, and attention—since they possess the power, if treated properly, to germinate and grow into divine awareness. Empedocles' poetry contains what is needed for this organic process to take place.

Parmenides and Empedocles are also united by a shared understanding of death and, in particular, its role in the mystical path. While all readings of Empedocles recognise that his cosmology involves the four roots of earth, air or aithêr, fire, and water, united by Love and separated by Strife, Kingsley differs radically from most readers of Empedocles, ancient and modern, with respect to the ordering and significance of the cycle. He argues that most readings of Empedocles are grossly incorrect and essentially backwards, noting that Empedocles begins each cycle with the elements in a state of separation, followed by a blending under the influence of Love, then finally a return to the original state of separation under Strife. This, however, is not some kind of cosmic pessimism, unless one misunderstands what Empedocles is really saying.

According to Kingsley, if one follows Empedocles' words carefully, one sees that the elements, while separate, exist in a state of immortality and purity. When they are brought together by Love or Aphrodite they are essentially seduced into incarnate, mortal existence and mixture—and thus an existence foreign to their true natures of immortality and purity. Consequently, when they are separated again by Strife, this is not cause for lament: it is the liberation of the elements from the unnatural and forced condition brought about by Love and a return to immortality and purity. This reading of Empedocles is highly suggestive of similar Orphic and Pythagorean views of incarnation, divinisation, and death. Parmenides, in turn, travels to the depths of the underworld—the world of death—and meets a goddess whom Kingsley identifies as Persephone, the queen of the dead. It is only by making this journey that Parmenides is able to learn the truth about reality and mortal opinion and return to the world of the living with his prophetic message. Thus, both Empedocles and Parmenides, like other mystics, find wisdom, healing, and eternal life in what most people suppose to be the dark and grim reality of death. As Kingsley puts it, the essential requirement for travelling this spiritual path is that, "You have to die before you die."

Finally, both Parmenides and Empedocles stress the necessity of reaching divine stillness by embracing motion wholeheartedly. In Parmenides, the imperfect perception of reality as changing and moving ultimately gives way to a perception of its perfect stillness. In Empedocles, the eternal motion of the cosmic cycle gives way to motionlessness. However, for a human being actually to perceive the stillness of reality, a quality of supreme attentiveness, beyond anything mortals are capable of, must be cultivated. The Greeks, Parmenides and Empedocles included, called this divine attribute mêtis, a quality possessed by the gods and given by them, under special circumstances, to mortals who had earned their favour. The union of divine grace and conscious, human co-operation makes it possible for the divine quality of mêtis to be cultivated and eventually come into being—an outcome described by Kingsley as an organic flowering of consciousness.

Kingsley continues to work to return the tradition of Parmenides and Empedocles to consciousness, inside the academic world and also beyond. Plato and Aristotle, who defined the parameters of western philosophy without being fully aware of or sympathetic to the esoteric context in which Empedocles and Parmenides spoke, continue to exert influence both over our understandings of Parmenides and Empedocles as well as our notions of what philosophy is. Kingsley aims to make awareness of Parmenides and Empedocles, as well as the reality of their tradition, available again.

== Reception ==
One of the most notable aspects of Kingsley's writings is that they have had a major influence not only on the study of ancient Greek philosophy but also on many other related areas of interest.

In 1999 A. A. Long, Professor Emeritus of Classics at University of California, Berkeley, emphasized the importance of the challenge already posed by Kingsley’s early work, "which advances very new ideas connecting early Greek philosophy to magic and traces their transmission into Egypt, Islam, and medieval mysticism and alchemy." He named Kingsley's first two published books as prime examples of studies which "encourage us to expect that early Greek philosophy will be as effective at stimulating thought and reinterpretation in the next century as it has been during the past hundred years."

In 2013 Gabriele Cornelli, Professor of Ancient Philosophy at the University of Brasilia and Director of the Archai UNESCO Chair on the Origins of Western Thought, published his historical work In Search of Pythagoreanism. He titled the first section of the book "History of Criticism: from Zeller to Kingsley" and, by listing Kingsley's writings alongside the renowned contributions of Walter Burkert, presented him as one of the most significant interpreters of Pythagorean tradition in modern history. Cornelli credits Kingsley's careful attention to the language used by ancient Greek writers, coupled with his expertise in history, archaeology and the anthropology of religion, for allowing him to offer "unique and bold solutions" to the most sensitive issues. And while he notes that Kingsley's style in his later books deliberately flouts familiar academic norms, he acknowledges that this is just one part of the "radical hermeneutic reversal" offered by Kingsley through his conscious challenge to the deep-seated assumptions on which most interpretations of ancient philosophy have been based for centuries.

Outside the well-defined area of presocratic philosophy, Kingsley's published books and articles have also become a fundamental point of reference for experts in the field of ancient Greek religion. In addition, they are repeatedly noted for their significance by Walter Burkert in his research on the links between presocratic philosophy and the cultures of ancient Mesopotamia and Iran.

In September 2021 contemporary philosopher and scholar of religions Samuel Loncar wrote an in-depth survey of Kingsley's work for Marginalia, a channel of the Los Angeles Review of Books. He stated that "No one who works on Greek philosophy can ignore Kingsley's scholarship. A reckoning with Kingsley is ineluctable because the quality of his work is unignorable." Loncar praises Kingsley's work as corrective of a long history of errors in the understanding of western philosophy's origins, noting how "Kingsley has rotated right side up Nietzsche’s image of Apollo with better history; he has fully absorbed as few have, and corrected as few are able, Dodds' The Greeks and the Irrational; and he has transformed over two thousand years of writing on the founders of Greek philosophy" — not only through his scholarship but also through committing the "academic high treason" of taking his writing seriously in his own life and placing himself in the tradition of philosophy he describes.

Kingsley's influence on Islamic scholarship is visible in the published work of Seyyed Hossein Nasr, one of the most influential Muslim scholars in the world and also a practicing Sufi. Nasr begins his seminal book Islamic Philosophy from its Origin to the Present with a detailed analysis of “the recent brilliant studies of Peter Kingsley” and, with their help, argues for the existence of a single prophetic tradition extending all the way from Parmenides and Empedocles through to Muhammad. He has separately published extended reviews of some of Kingsley's books, describing Reality as a work that “unveils a reality which, if understood and accepted, will transform the understanding of contemporary Western humanity of itself and of the roots of Western civilization. It deals with truths which are of the greatest existential importance, truths whose understanding is literally a matter of life and death.” Additionally he contributed a foreword to the Persian translation of In the Dark Places of Wisdom, again pointing to the significance of Kingsley’s work not only for the theoretical study of Islam but also for practical Sufism. As the contemporary Anglo-Russian Sufi teacher Natalia Nur Jahan has also stated: “There is life before reading Mr. Kingsley’s books…and there is life after, and that only just begins to describe what one is getting oneself into here.”

In 2008 Kingsley was the subject of a documentary, "Finding Our Ancient Wisdom", produced by Tom Tanquary and Linda Whang. The film includes interviews with Huston Smith, Pir Zia Inayat Khan, Gregory Shaw and Cynthia Bourgeault about their individual perceptions and assessments of Peter Kingsley's work.

In his 2014 book American Gurus, Arthur Versluis, Professor of Religious Studies at Michigan State University and specialist in the history of western mysticism and esotericism, has devoted considerable space and effort to understanding the spiritual dimension of Kingsley's writings. He sees in the teachings of Parmenides and Empedocles a salient example of what he terms "immediatism": a religious phenomenon that emphasizes "an immediate, primordial illumination." But whereas this phenomenon is typically associated with Indian or Tibetan traditions, through Kingsley's work we are faced with "direct, transformative illumination" as an essential aspect of "the primordial wisdom of the West."

Kingsley's work on western spiritual traditions—as well as his own status as a modern-day mystic—has also been affirmed by contemporary spiritual teachers. American non-dual spiritual teacher Adyashanti, who in 2020 invited Kingsley to appear on his Being Unlimited podcast, remarked that "Peter is someone who to me has…unparalleled knowledge and passion for the origins of western culture. He is an incredible scholar of that time period but he’s also a first-class mystic."

Joseph Rael, a Native American tribal elder, shaman, writer, and artist, penned the foreword to Kingsley's book A Story Waiting to Pierce You. Rael refers to Kingsley as "an elder brother" and says of the book: "This is the real thing. In each paragraph of the book, the Spirit is there. This is what the native people of the Americas have been trying to say, but were never permitted to…Because he does what needs to be done and says what has to be heard, I consider Peter Kingsley to be one of the most courageous people on the planet at this moment."

== Select bibliography ==
Books

- Ancient Philosophy, Mystery and Magic. Empedocles and Pythagorean Tradition (Oxford, UK: Oxford University Press, 1995)
- In the Dark Places of Wisdom (Point Reyes, CA: Golden Sufi Center Publishing, 1999)
- Reality (1st ed., Inverness, CA: Golden Sufi Center, 2003; 2nd ed., London: Catafalque Press, 2020)
- A Story Waiting to Pierce You: Mongolia, Tibet and the Destiny of the Western World (Point Reyes, CA: Golden Sufi Center Publishing, 2010; 2nd ed., London: Catafalque Press, 2025)
- Catafalque: Carl Jung and the End of Humanity (2 volumes, London: Catafalque Press, 2018; single-volume with minor revisions, London: Catafalque Press, 2021)
- A Book of Life (London: Catafalque Press, 2021)
- The Watching Words (London: Catafalque Press, 2026)

Translations

- Quest for the Red Sulphur: The Life of Ibn 'Arabi by Claude Addas, tr. Peter Kingsley (Cambridge, UK: Islamic Texts Society, 1993)

Articles

- “The Greek Origin of the Sixth-Century Dating of Zoroaster,” Bulletin of the School of Oriental and African Studies, volume 53 (London, UK, 1990), 245–265
- “Poimandres: The Etymology of the Name and the Origins of the Hermetica,” Journal of the Warburg and Courtauld Institutes, volume 56 (London, 1993), 1–24. Reprinted, with additions and updates, in From Poimandres to Jacob Boehme, ed. R. van den Broek and C. van Heertum (Amsterdam, Netherlands: In de Pelikaan, 2000), 42–76
- “Empedocles and his Interpreters: The Four-Element Doxography,” Phronesis, volume 39 (Assen, Netherlands, 1994), 235–254
- “Greeks, Shamans and Magi,” Studia Iranica, volume 23 (Paris, 1994), 187–198
- “Empedocles’ Sun,” Classical Quarterly, volume 44 (Oxford, 1994), 316–324
- “From Pythagoras to the Turba philosophorum: Egypt and Pythagorean Tradition,” Journal of the Warburg and Courtauld Institutes, volume 57 (London, 1994), 1–13
- “Meetings with Magi: Iranian Themes among the Greeks, from Xanthus of Lydia to Plato’s Academy,” Journal of the Royal Asiatic Society, Third Series, volume 5 (London, 1995), 173–209
- "Knowing Beyond Knowing: The Heart of Hermetic Tradition", Parabola, volume 22/1 (New York, 1997), pp. 21-25. Translated into Greek in Avaton, volume 4 (Thessaloniki, September/October 1999), pp. 68-71
- “An Introduction to the Hermetica: The Asclepius and Ancient Esoteric Tradition”, in From Poimandres to Jacob Boehme, ed. R. van den Broek and C. van Heertum (Amsterdam: In de Pelikaan, 2000), 18–40.
- “Empedocles for the New Millennium,” Ancient Philosophy, volume 22 (Pittsburgh, 2002), 333–413
- "The Paths of the Ancient Sages: A Sacred Tradition Between East and West", in Crossing Religious Frontiers: Studies in Comparative Religion, ed. Harry Oldmeadow (Bloomington, IN: World Wisdom, Inc., 2010), 43–49.
- "Shamans among the Greeks", ASDIWAL, volume 19 (Geneva, 2024), 237–248.

== See also ==
- Pythagoras
- Parmenides
- Empedocles
- Pythagoreanism

== Sources ==
- Ancient Philosophy, Mystery and Magic. Empedocles and Pythagorean Tradition (Oxford, UK: Oxford University Press, 1995)
- In the Dark Places of Wisdom (Point Reyes, CA: Golden Sufi Center Publishing, 1999)
- “Empedocles for the New Millennium,” Ancient Philosophy, volume 22 (Pittsburgh, 2002), 333–413
- Reality (2nd ed., London: Catafalque Press, 2020)
