= Astronoid =

American post-metal band

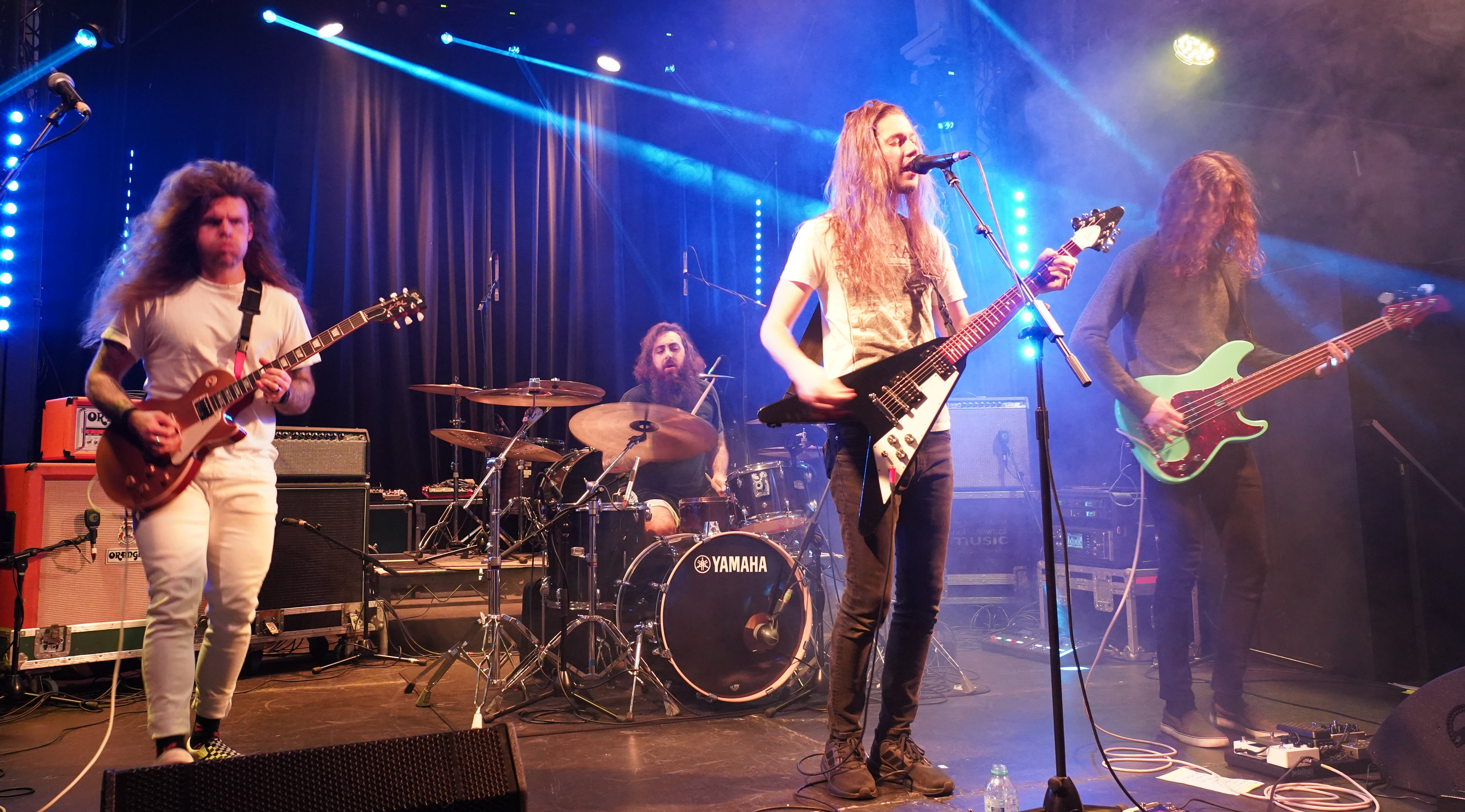
- Playing in Colchester, April 2023

Background information
- Origin: Lowell, Massachusetts, U.S.
- Genres: Post-metal; shoegaze; black metal; progressive metal
- Years active: 2012–present
- Labels: Blood Music, 3DOT Recordings
- Members: Brett Boland; Daniel Schwartz; Casey Aylward
- Past members: Mike DeMellia; Matt St. Jean
- Website: www.astronoidband.com

Astronoid is an American post-metal band from Lowell, Massachusetts, formed in 2012. Started by vocalist Brett Boland and bassist Daniel Schwartz, the current lineup includes Boland, Schwartz, guitarist Casey Aylward, and drummer Matt St. Jean. They have released two extended plays, November (2012) and Stargazer (2013), and four studio albums, Air (2016), the eponymous Astronoid (2019), Radiant Bloom (2022) and Stargod (2025).

== History ==
The band started as a studio project between vocalist Brett Boland and bassist Daniel Schwartz. Boland had previously played in Morning Glory. They recorded two songs, which were released as the November EP, on May 11, 2012. The second song on the EP "Astronoid" featured guest vocals from Nick Thornbury of Vattnet Viskar. On November 22, 2012, the band released a cover of the My Bloody Valentine song "Only Shallow".

The band's second release Stargazer, was a four song EP that came out on July 2, 2013. They then recruited guitarists Casey Aylward and Mike DeMelia and drummer Matt St. Jean to tour. Boland, Aylward and Schwartz were previously bandmates in post-hardcore band Hetfield & Hetfield. This lineup began to work on their debut LP, Air.

After forming the full band, the group was signed to Blood Music. They are currently based out of Boston, Massachusetts.

The band was inspired by Devin Townsend, Ihsahn, and Emperor as well as Mew during this time. The band and their record label began describing their sound as "Dream Thrash" in 2016, a genre originally coined by New Jersey thrash metal band Eliminator in 2012. Noisey described Air as "a buoyant mix of metal, thrash, punk, prog-rock and shoegaze". Metal Sucks described the album as "an instant classic".

In early 2017, they toured in support of Ghost Bath. In addition, they opened for Ghost on several shows, and toured in support of Periphery and Animals As Leaders. In 2018, the band were announced as support for Zeal & Ardor on their North American tour.

On October 31, 2018, the band announced guitarist Mike DeMellia was leaving the group to pursue other musical and creative interests.

On November 27, 2018, Astronoid announced their second studio album, Astronoid for release on February 1, 2019.

In April 2022, the band announced its third album, titled Radiant Bloom, would be released later in the year in June. The album's first single, "Eyes", was released on April 6. The second single, "Sleep Whisper", was released on April 28. "Human", the album's third single, was released on May 19. Radiant Bloom was released on June 3 through 3DOT Recordings.

== Discography ==
=== Studio albums ===
Year	Album	Label
2016	Air	Blood Music
2019	Astronoid	Blood Music
2022	Radiant Bloom	3DOT Recordings
2025	Stargod	3DOT Recordings

=== Extended plays ===
Year	Album	Label
2012	November	Independent
2013	Stargazer	Independent

=== Music videos ===
Year	Song	Album
2017	"Obsolete"	Air
2018	"I Dream in Lines"	Astronoid
2022	"Eyes"	Radiant Bloom
2025	"Third Shot"	Stargod

== Band members ==
=== Current members ===
- Brett Boland – vocals, rhythm guitar (2012–present)
- Daniel Schwartz – bass (2012–present)
- Casey Aylward – lead guitar (2014–present)
- Dylan Charest - drums (2025-present)

=== Past members ===
- Mike DeMellia – guitar (2014–2018)
- Matt St. Jean – drums (2014–2025)
