= Bath (album) =

Studio album by Maudlin of the Well
- Released: August 31, 2001
- Genre: Avant-garde metal; progressive metal
- Length: 61:02
- Label: Dark Symphonies; Blood Music

Maudlin of the Well chronology
My Fruit Psychobells...A Seed Combustible (1999)	Bath (2001)	Leaving Your Body Map (2001)

Professional ratings
Review scores
Source	Rating
Sputnikmusic	link

Bath is the second studio album recorded by the American avant-garde metal band Maudlin of the Well. It was released on August 31, 2001, by Dark Symphonies, alongside its companion album Leaving Your Body Map. It was the last album released before their breakup.

== Background ==
Bath and Leaving Your Body Map, alongside introducing brand new songs, rearranges and re-orchestrates demo material first written in 1997. All songs on both albums were recorded simultaneously, in order to achieve consistency; to this end, the opening of "Girl with a Watering Can" re-orchestrates the first melody of "The Blue Ghost / Shedding Qliphoth", and the series of instrumental interludes sequenced in order of appearance across both albums. The melody of the fourth (and final) interlude purportedly came from a lucid dream, fulfilling a stated objective of the project. Each album features cover art befitting the title of its counterpart, with Bath featuring a map to a bath tub and window in yellow, and Leaving Your Body Map featuring the tub and window in red. The band inserted clues to a hidden secret in the liner notes of the albums through a series of complex symbols; to aid listeners, they recorded and released "The Secret Song" on an MCD in 2001, with lyrics purported to explain how to unlock the hidden message. While the puzzle was solved in 2020, the solution was only officially confirmed in 2025.

Both albums were reissued on Dark Symphonies with bonus tracks in 2005–2006. Blood Music subsequently reissued the albums in 2012, releasing them on vinyl for the very first time. A version including a box set for the companion albums and later a CD box set of the band's discography was also released.

== Track listing ==
No.	Title	Length
1.	"The Blue Ghost / Shedding Qliphoth"	7:57
2.	"They Aren't All Beautifull"	5:36
3.	"Heaven and Weak"	7:42
4.	"Interlude 1"	1:38
5.	"The Ferryman"	7:50
6.	"Marid's Gift of Art"	3:41
7.	"Girl with a Watering Can"	8:44
8.	"Birth Pains of Astral Projection"	10:34
9.	"Interlude 2"	2:13
10.	"Geography"	4:26
Total length:		61:02

Dark Symphonies 2005 rerelease
No.	Title	Length
11.	"The Ocean, the Kingdom, and the Temptation" (Demo)	12:27
12.	"Uncovering the Gift" (Demo)	2:47
13.	"The Horror of Lunar's Retreat"	2:45
Total length:		76:01

Blood Music 2012 rerelease
No.	Title	Length
11.	"The Bleeding Month" (1997 demo of "Girl with a Watering Can")	6:08
Total length:		67:09

== Personnel ==
- Jason Byron – vocals, keyboards
- Toby Driver – vocals, guitars, bass
- Maria-Stella Fountoulakis – vocals
- Greg Massi – vocals, guitars
- Josh Seipp-Williams – guitars
- Jason Bitner – trumpet
- Terran Olson – vocals, clarinet, flute
- Sam Gutterman – drums, vocals
