= Ayloss =

Greek musician

Ayloss is a Greek metal musician who plays the guitar, bass, drums and keyboards and is especially known from several solo projects including Spectral Lore, Divine Element, Mystras, Auriferous Flame and Night Vigil.

Ayloss has been known for espousing an anti-fascist message.

Ayloss has also been a guest musician for Locust Leaves.

== Select discography ==
=== Spectral Lore ===
Albums

- I (2006)
- II (2007)
- Sentinel (2012)
- III (2014)
- Ετερόφωτος (2021)

Splits

- with Underjordiska (2008)
- with Locust Leaves (2012)
- Sol with Mare Cognitum (2013)
- The Quivering Lights with Nachtreich (2014)
- Helian with Jute Gyte (2018)
- Wanderers: Astrology of the Nine with Mare Cognitum (2020)

EPs

- Voyager (2015)
- Gnosis (2015)
- Fossils (2016)
- 11 Days (2023)

=== Divine Element ===
- Divine Element (2010)
- Thaurachs of Borsu (2017)

=== Mystras ===
- Castles Conquered and Reclaimed (2020)
- Empires Vanquished and Dismantled (2021)

=== Auriferous Flame ===
- The Great Mist Within (2022)
- Ardor for Black Mastery (2023)
- The Insurrectionists and the Caretakers (2024)

== External link ==
- Spectral Lore in Metal Storm
