= Det Eviga Leendet =

Swedish metal band

Det Eviga Leendet is a Swedish black metal band. They have released two albums.

The band was founded in 2015 and named after Det eviga leendet ("The Eternal Smile"), a publication by Nobel Literature Prize laureate Pär Lagerkvist. The members were kept secret, though the US musician Jacob Buczarski of Mare Cognitum was revealed to be the vocalist.

In 2018 they released their debut album Lenience through Fallen Empire Records, re-released in Europe in 2019 by Oberhausen-based Amor Fati Productions. Rock Hard gave an 8 out of 10 score, as did Metal.de. The music was depressive and raw, "a work steeped in grief and despair" while also "devoid of melodrama". Vampster described it as relentless, "a swirling vortex of distorted riffs that drags everything else down into the depths". A Stereogum reviewer called it a "maniacal and occasionally frantic album of noisy rippers" drawing "from a palette smeared with black metal, punk, post-hardcore and more".

In 2022 the follow-up was released, Reverence on the label Mystískaos. Metal Hammer described it as a wall-of-sound black metal output with "subtle atmospherics, taut tremolo and bestial black metal bellowed straight from the diaphragm".

== External link ==
- Discogs

=== Further reading ===
- Review of Lenience by White Room Reviews (in Dutch)
- Review of Reverence by Metal Bite
- Review of Reverence by Obliveon (in German)
- Review of Reverence by Rocking.gr (in Greek)
- Review of Reverence by Wrota Krypty (in Polish)
