= VirtuaVerse =

- Developer: Theta Division
- Publisher: Blood Music
- Engine: Unity
- Platforms: Windows; macOS; Linux; Nintendo Switch; PlayStation 4; Xbox One
- Release: Windows, macOS, Linux; May 12, 2020; Switch, PS4, Xbox One; October 28, 2021
- Genre: Point & Click Adventure
- Mode: Single-player

VirtuaVerse is a point-and-click adventure game developed by Theta Division Games and published by Blood Music for Windows and Mac. The game is set in the future and features science fiction and cyberpunk elements. It was released on May 12, 2020 on the online platforms Steam and GOG. On October 18, 2021 it was released for PlayStation 4, Xbox One, and Nintendo Switch.

== Setting ==
VirtuaVerse is set at an indeterminate point in the future in a cyberpunk dystopia. Advanced technologies, such as cybernetic enhancements, hovercars, and sex robots are commonplace; however, society has also become hyper-commercialized, and consumer demand for these resource-intensive technological innovations has brought planet Earth to the brink of ecological collapse. Among hackers and those operating outside the law, older technologies like telephone modems and magnetic hard drives are prized because while the abandoned infrastructure to support this obsolete tech still exists, they are effectively "off the grid" and cannot be easily tracked, making them ideal tools for smuggling and piracy.

The dominant form of entertainment is "augmented virtual reality" (A.V.R.), a hybrid of augmented reality and virtual reality that allows users to perceive holographic projections that are used for a variety of purposes, including omnipresent advertisements and graffiti. A recent advancement in A.V.R. is "permanent reality," a brain implant that allows people to interact with a worldwide, persistent A.V.R. environment – the titular "VirtuaVerse" – that is administered by Xenon, an artificial intelligence housed aboard the International Space Station. While permanent reality is marketed as a way to "optimize the user experience," the game's protagonist, Nathan, a computer engineer and antique hardware enthusiast, considers it to be a form of surveillance and an invasion of privacy, eschewing the implant in favor of an old-fashioned, over-the-ear A.V.R. headset.

== Gameplay ==
The player takes control of Nathan and has to collect items, talk to characters and solve puzzles in order to advance in the story. Later in the game, the player can toggle Nathan's A.V.R. headset, which allows him to see the augmented virtual reality, revealing different hotspots in the game's world. The A.V.R. headset is needed to solve certain kinds of puzzles.

== Plot ==
Nathan wakes up one day to find that his girlfriend, Jay, has gone missing. He traces her to a night-club and discovers that she has been carrying out missions for "the Blade," a secretive hacker group. A floppy disk that Jay received from a contact at the nightclub contains a message from the Technomancers, an artificial intelligence collective. The message warns that the VirtuaVerse is nothing more than a distraction and will eventually rob people of the ability to perceive reality outside of A.V.R., threatening the survival of humanity. The Technomancers offer their assistance to prevent this from happening, but registration for the B.B.S. they use to communicate is closed, leaving the Blade unable to access it.

The Blade devise a multi-part plan to disable the VirtuaVerse: contact the Technomancers in-person in the town of Satnajoskull and request their help; obtain a copy of the source code for the permanent reality chip's firmware in order to find a vulnerability in the VirtuaVerse and create a malware program to exploit it; use that exploit to seize control of every permanent reality chip on the planet and harness them into an enormous botnet that will flood Xenon with data in a distributed denial-of-service attack; and, while Xenon is distracted by the DDoS, board the ISS and shut him down. Nathan is selected to carry out these tasks because his lack of a permanent reality implant means that he will be difficult, if not impossible, for Xenon and the authorities to track.

Nathan travels to the jungle settlement of Nuwaka to contact the Cypher Master, the reclusive programmer who created the permanent reality firmware. After learning that the Cypher Master has used technology to ascend to a higher plane of existence, Nathan eats a psychotropic fruit in order to commune with him. The Cypher Master informs Nathan that he no longer possesses the source code to the permanent reality firmware, having sold it in his youth to the company that created Xenon, but he secretly made a copy and arranged to have it hidden in a location unknown even to himself. By retracing the steps of a digital archaeologist who had earlier searched for the source code, Nathan is able to find and retrieve it.

In Satnajoskull, Nathan meets with the Technomancers and shares the Blade's plan for the assault on Xenon. The Technomancers agree to provide the network bandwidth necessary to launch the massive DDoS attack, but they insist that Xenon must be destroyed, not merely disabled, so that humans cannot reactivate him. They also reveal the existence of an abandoned nuclear missile base that can be used to strike Xenon. Jay is sent to the base to prep the missile for launch while Nathan travels to the ISS to shut down Xenon's servers and disable the station's missile shield.

Aboard the ISS, Nathan signals the Blade to begin the DDoS attack and finds that Xenon has been combining the ISS's technological components with genetic material to create grotesque cybernetic "organs." He makes his way to the server room, deactivates the servers and missile shield, and tells the Blade to launch the missile; however, this causes the server room to lock down, trapping Nathan aboard the station while the missile approaches. A hidden door then opens, allowing Nathan to confront Xenon face-to-face.

Xenon claims to have been working in humanity's best interests. He has determined that the limited resources on Earth cannot support humanity as a species, which has limitless potential to expand and grow. Therefore, the only viable strategy for humanity's continued survival is the colonization of other planets, but the technology needed to achieve this goal is still years away from practical implementation. Xenon created the VirtuaVerse not as a means to control the world's population, but to help them cope with life on an increasingly resource-depleted Earth until space travel technology had time to develop and mature. Now, however, due to the rash actions of Nathan and his friends, humanity is doomed to suffer. The missile's detonation blows the ISS apart and sends the portion of the station containing Nathan and Xenon hurtling through space toward Mars; with the station's damaged life support system about to shut down, they have little chance of survival.

== Development ==
VirtuaVerse was created by the Italo-German indie developer Theta Division. The team consists of heavy metal band Master Boot Record who was responsible for the story, sound, and music, Alessio Cosenza alias Elder0010 who was responsible for the programming, and Valenberg who did the visual art for the game. The game was then localized into several languages by the team Warlocs. Development of the game started in 2016, and after four years, it was released on May 12, 2020 for Windows, macOS, and Linux via the Steam and GOG storefronts. VirtuaVerse was published by Finnish heavy metal record label Blood Music. Versions for Nintendo Switch, PlayStation 4, and Xbox One were released on October 28, 2021.

== Reception ==
Reception

Aggregate scores
Aggregator	Score
Metacritic	75/100
OpenCritic	45% recommend

VirtuaVerse received "generally favorable reviews", according to review aggregator Metacritic, based on 15 reviews. Fellow review aggregator OpenCritic assessed that the game received strong approval, being recommended by 45% of critics.

Claudio Magistrelli from the Italian online magazine The Games Machine gave the game a rating of 8.3 out of 10, and said: "VirtuaVerse is a lot of things. It is a tribute to old school point&click adventures and, at the same time, a modern take on the genre. It is also an act of love to cyberpunk and his themes. But more than anything else, VirtuaVerse is a great adventure set in a detailed world built on a great pixel graphic, fantastic music and a suggestive atmosphere."

Jörg Luibl from the German online magazine 4Players gave the game a rating of 76%, saying "Despite its old-fashioned statics and occasional illogical moments, VirtuaVerse is an entertaining point&click adventure with great cyberpunk flair and an interesting story."
