= My Fruit Psychobells...A Seed Combustible =

Studio album by maudlin of the Well
- Released: 1999
- Genre: Avant-garde metal Progressive metal
- Length: 58:31
- Label: Dark Symphonies

Maudlin of the Well chronology
My Fruit Psychobells...A Seed Combustible (1999)	Bath (2001)

My Fruit Psychobells...A Seed Combustible is maudlin of the Well's first album, released in 1999.

Professional ratings
Review scores
Source	Rating
Sputnikmusic	4/5 stars

== Track listing ==
All music by Toby Driver. All lyrics as noted.

Original release
No.	Title	Lyrics	Length
1.	"Ferocious Weights"	Fountoulakis, Driver	7:35
2.	"A Conception Pathetic"	Byron	7:03
3.	"Undine and Underwater Flowers"	Byron	8:47
4.	"The Ocean, the Kingdom, and the Temptation"	Byron	11:22
5.	"Pondering a Wall"	Driver	6:21
6.	"Catharsis of Sea-Sleep and Dreaming Shrines"	Byron	9:33
7.	"Blight of River-Systems"	Driver	5:50
8.	Untitled		2:00
Total length:			58:31

Dark Symphonies remaster and Blood Music re-issue bonus tracks
No.	Title	Length
9.	"Beauty"	8:38
10.	"The Crystal Margin"	3:23
Total length:		70:32

== Personnel ==
- Jason Byron - harsh vocals
- Maria-Stella Fountoulakis - vocals
- Greg Massi - guitar
- Toby Driver - guitar, bass, keyboard, clean vocals, clarinet
- Jason Bitner - trumpet
- Andrew Dickson - drums
- Sky Cooper - guitar (solo on "Undine And Underwater Flowers")
