= Mare Cognitum (band) =

American metal band

Mare Cognitum is an American atmospheric black metal solo project by Jacob Buczarski. They have released five albums.

Among others, Buczarski is also the vocalist of Swedish group Det Eviga Leendet.

== Discography ==
=== Albums ===
- The Sea Which Has Become Known (2011)
- An Extraconscious Lucidity (2012)
- Phobos Monolith (2014)
- Luminiferous Aether (2016)
- Solar Paroxysm (2021)

=== Splits ===
- Sol with Spectral Lore (2013)
- Resonance: Crimson Void with Aureole (2016)
- Wanderers: Astrology of the Nine with Spectral Lore (2020)

== External link ==
- Discogs
- Mare Cognitum at Metal Storm

=== Further reading ===
- Review of The Sea Which Has Become Known by Sentinel Daily
- Review of The Sea Which Has Become Known by Metalfan.nl (in Dutch)
- Review of The Sea Which Has Become Known by
- Review of An Extraconscious Lucidity by Crossfire-Metal (in German)
- Review of An Extraconscious Lucidity by Teeth of the Divine
- Review of An Extraconscious Lucidity by Metal Bite
- Review of An Extraconscious Lucidity by Eternal Terror

- Review of Phobos Monolith by Last Rites
- Review of Phobos Monolith by Teeth of the Divine
- Review of Phobos Monolith by Wonderbox Metal
- Review of Phobos Monolith by BlackMetal.at (in German)
- Review of Phobos Monolith by Crossfire-Metal (in German)
- Review of Luminiferous Aether by Angry Metal Guy
- Review of Luminiferous Aether by Metalfan.nl (in Dutch)
- Review of Luminiferous Aether by Metal 1 (in German)
- Review of Luminiferous Aether by Crossfire-Metal
- Review of Luminiferous Aether by Wonderbox Metal

- Review of Solar Paroxysm by Angry Metal Guy
- Review of Solar Paroxysm by Wonderbox Metal
- Review of Solar Paroxysm by Echoes and Dust
- Review of Sol by Teeth of the Divine
- Review of Sol by Eternal Terror
- Review of Wanderers by Angry Metal Guy
- Review of Wanderers by Last Rites
- Review of Wanderers by Wonderbox Metal
