= Perturbator =

French musician

- Perturbator at Rock am Ring, 2017

Background information
- Born: James Kent; January 22, 1993 (age 33); Paris, France
- Origin: Paris, France
- Genres: Electronic; synthwave; industrial; darksynth; post-punk; dark wave; gothic rock
- Years active: 2012–present
- Labels: Blood Music (2014-2024); Nuclear Blast Records (2025-)
- Website: perturbator.com

James Kent (born January 22, 1993), known by his stage name Perturbator, is a French electronic music musician from Paris.

== Early life ==
James Kent was born on January 22, 1993 to British music critic Nick Kent and French music journalist Laurence Romance. Kent's muscianship stemmed from his parents' careers; his parents were themselves musicians and had a tech trance band when they were young, which further influenced Kent's interest in synthesizers.

== Career ==
Kent played guitar in several black metal bands before starting Perturbator.

Since 2012, he has produced electronic music inspired by cyberpunk culture and movies such as Akira, Ghost in the Shell, and The Running Man. He uses a variety of software synths in his productions, such as the emulators of old vintage synths like the OB-X or the CS-80. Since his debut EP, Night Driving Avenger, he has released five full-length albums, the latest of which is Age of Aquarius on the Blood Music label, and has performed several live shows. Several of his tracks were featured in the 2012 game Hotline Miami and its 2015 sequel Hotline Miami 2: Wrong Number. Perturbator's EP Sexualizer was released in part to officially release the song "Miami Disco" and as a way to thank the developers of Hotline Miami. The success of the Hotline Miami games resulted in a greater amount of exposure to a mainstream audience.

Perturbator released his fourth full-length album The Uncanny Valley on 6 May 2016 through Blood Music on a range of formats including Digibook CD, vinyl, and cassette tape. The album was met with generally positive reviews, with MetalSucks and Bloody Disgusting both writing in praise of it. Some versions of the album also included a bonus EP, with Kent writing that "The first three songs complement the themes covered within The Uncanny Valley, and the final track—'VERS/US'—is a demo from The Uncanny Valley writing sessions that fits the mood and atmosphere of the album but didn't quite make it into the final cut." Bloody Disgusting gave the album 5/5 and wrote that The Uncanny Valley "is sure to not only please fans of the genre but also win over newcomers."

Kent has a side project called L'Enfant De La Forêt and his own label called "Music of the Void".

In 2019, Kent appeared in the documentary film The Rise of the Synths, appearing alongside various other composers from the synthwave scene, including filmmaker John Carpenter, who also narrated the film, which explored the origins and growth of the genre.

He formed a side band, Ruin Of Romantics, with Francis Caste of Dysfunctional by Choice, Vince Mercier, formerly in Mass Hysteria, and Mehdi Thépegnier of Hangman's Chair. They released the two-track single "Self Control" in January 2021, which showcased a more shoegaze and ambient approach to goth, and then "Bleeding in the Fields" in October. The first album of Ruin Of Romantics, Velvet Dawn, was released on 29 October 2021 through Music of the Void.

== Discography ==
Adapted from AllMusic, SoundCloud, Bandcamp, Google Play Music, Discogs, and official website.

=== Studio albums ===
- Terror 404 (May 2012, self-released; remaster released in March 2015 by Blood Music)
- I Am the Night (December 2012, self-released; remaster released in March 2015 by Blood Music)
- Dangerous Days (June 2014, Blood Music / Telefuture Records)
- The Uncanny Valley (May 2016, Blood Music)
- Lustful Sacraments (May 2021, Blood Music)
- Age of Aquarius (October 2025, Nuclear Blast)

=== EPs ===
- Night Driving Avenger (March 2012, self-released; remaster released in October 2015 by Blood Music)
- Nocturne City (August 2012, Aphasia Records)
- The 80s Slasher (October 2012, Collaboration with Protector 101, Aphasia Records)
- LA Cop Duo / Selections (March 2013, Collaboration with Protector 101, Revolving Door Records)
- Sexualizer (June 2013, Aphasia Records)
- The Uncanny Valley – Bonus (May 2016, Blood Music)
- New Model (September 2017, Blood Music / Music of the Void)
- Excess EP (2021, Blood Music)

=== Collaborations ===
==== With Final Light (Perturbator & Johannes Persson of Cult of Luna) ====
- Final Light (June 24, 2022, Sivian, Red CRK AB) [Catalog #: SVN001CD, Barcode #: 8436566651868]

=== Compilations ===
- B-sides and Remixes, Vol. I (November 2018, Blood Music)
- B-sides and Remixes, Vol. II (November 2018, Blood Music)

=== Singles ===
- "She Moves Like a Knife" (January 2014)
- "She Is Young, She Is Beautiful, She Is Next" (March 2015)
- "Assault" (April 2015)
- "Tactical Precision Disarray" (December 2016)
- "Vantablack" (August 2017)
- "Body/Prison" (October 2018, Disco4 with Health)
- "Excess" (February 2019)
- "Death of the Soul" (February 2021)
- "Dethroned Under A Funeral Haze" (April 2021)
- "Dangerous (feat. Kabbel) (December 2023) — from the original soundtrack for the American Psycho comic series
- "The Art of War" (April 2025)

=== Music videos ===
Year	Album	Title	Director	Other featured artist
2014	Dangerous Days	She Is Young, She Is Beautiful, She Is Next	Jarkko Kinnunen & Sami Rämä	
2015	Dangerous Days	Complete Domination	Monte Legaspi	Carpenter Brut
2016	The Uncanny Valley	Sentient	Valenberg & Blood Music	Hayley Stewart
2017	The Uncanny Valley	Venger	David Fitt & Federico Pelat	Greta Link
2021	Lustful Sacraments	Death of the Soul	Metastazis	
2022	Lustful Sacraments	God Says	Metastazis	Hangman's Chair
2025	Age of Aquarius	The Art of War	Metastazis	
2025	Age of Aquarius	Apocalypse Now	Metastazis	Ulver
2025	Age of Aquarius	Lady Moon	Victorien Aubineau	Greta Link
