= List of works based on dreams =

Dreams have been credited as the inspiration for a number of creative works, inventions, and scientific discoveries.

== Literature ==
=== Kubla Khan ===
Samuel Taylor Coleridge wrote Kubla Khan (completed in 1797 and published in 1816) upon awakening from an opium-influenced dream. In a preface to the work, he described having the poem come to him, fully formed, in his dream. When he woke, he immediately set to writing it down, but was interrupted by a visitor and could not remember the final lines. For this reason, he kept it unpublished for many years.

=== Frankenstein ===
Mary Shelley's Frankenstein (1818) was inspired by vivid images that occurred to her while falling asleep:

When I placed my head upon my pillow, I did not sleep, nor could I be said to think. My imagination, unbidden, possessed and guided me, gifting the successive images that arose in my mind with a vividness far beyond the usual bounds of reverie. I saw the pale student of unhallowed arts kneeling beside the thing he had put together. I saw the hideous phantasm of a man stretched out, and then, on the working of some powerful engine, show signs of life, and stir with an uneasy, half-vital motion. Frightful must it be; for supremely frightful would be the effect of any human endeavor to mock the stupendous Creator of the world.

=== Strange Case of Dr Jekyll and Mr Hyde ===
Robert Louis Stevenson dreamed elements of his famous novel Strange Case of Dr Jekyll and Mr Hyde (1886), after having "long been trying to write a story on this subject". He wrote metaphorically of Brownie spirits doing "one-half my work for me while I am fast asleep". Of the novel, he later wrote:

For two days I went about racking my brains for a plot of any sort; and on the second night I dreamed the scene at the window, and a scene afterward split in two, in which Hyde, pursued for some crime, took the powder and underwent the change in the presence of his pursuers. All the rest was made awake, and consciously, although I think I can trace in much of it the manner of my Brownies. [...] All that was given me was the matter of three scenes, and the central idea of a voluntary change becoming involuntary.

=== Tintin in Tibet ===
The Belgian comics artist Hergé was plagued by nightmares in which he was chased by a white skeleton, whereupon the entire environment turned white. A psychiatrist advised him to stop making comics and take a rest, but Hergé drew an entire story set in a white environment: the snowy mountaintops of Tibet. Tintin in Tibet (1960) not only stopped his nightmares and worked as a therapeutic experience, but the work is also regarded as one of his masterpieces.

=== Twilight ===
Inspiration for Stephenie Meyer's Twilight (2005) came by a dream:

It was two people in kind of a little circular meadow with really bright sunlight, and one of them was a beautiful, sparkly boy and one was just a girl who was human and normal, and they were having this conversation. The boy was a vampire, which is so bizarre that I'd be dreaming about vampires, and he was trying to explain to her how much he cared about her and yet at the same time how much he wanted to kill her.

=== The Miraculous Journey of Edward Tulane ===
The seeds to the plot of The Miraculous Journey of Edward Tulane (2006) came to Kate DiCamillo in a dream: "One Christmas, I received an elegantly dressed toy rabbit as a gift. A few days later, I dreamed that the rabbit was face down on the ocean floor - lost and waiting to be found."

== Music ==
=== Devil's Trill Sonata ===
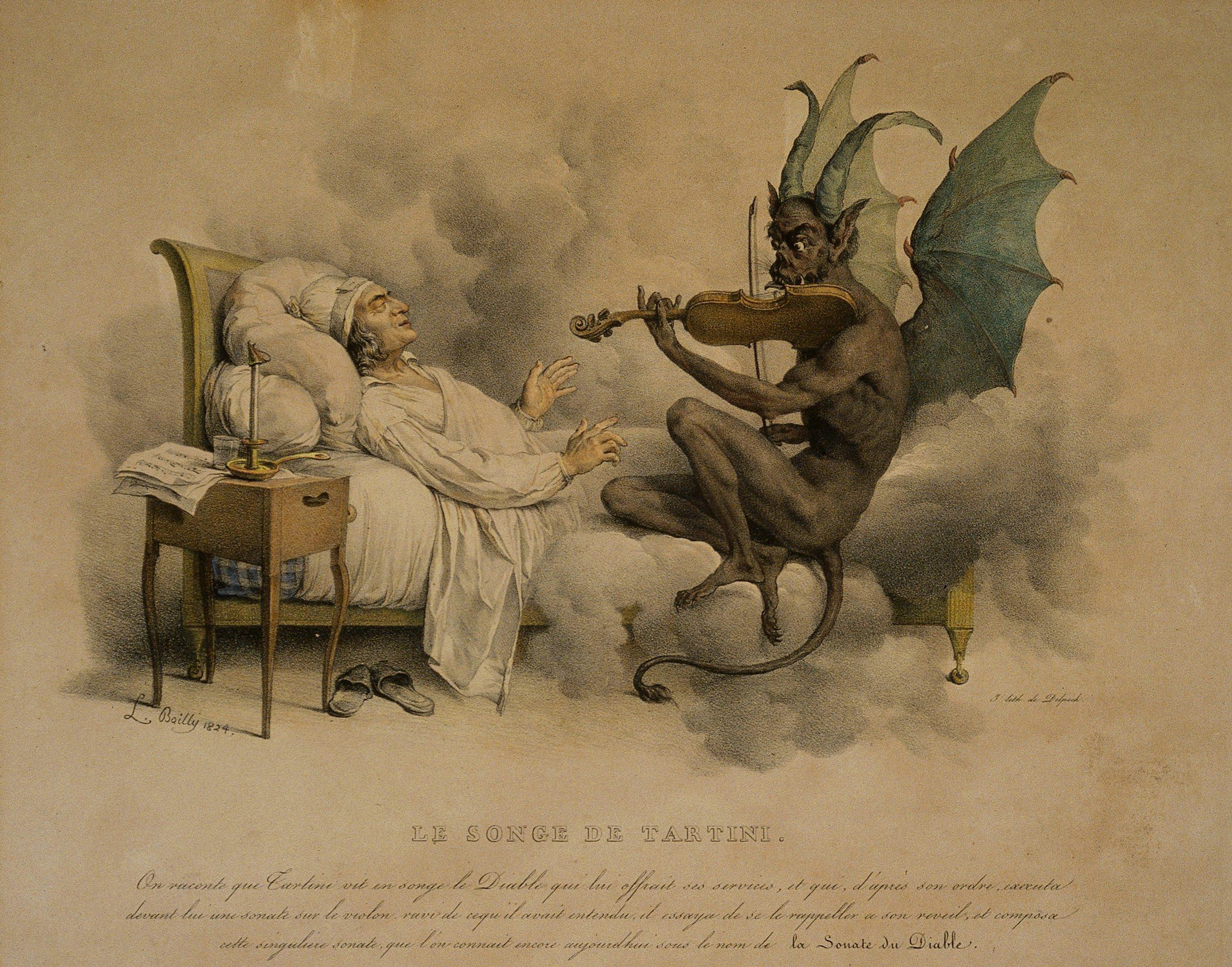
An 1824 illustration of Tartini's dream, by Louis-Léopold Boilly

Giuseppe Tartini recounted that his most famous work, his Violin Sonata in G minor, more commonly known as the Devil's Trill Sonata, came to him in a dream in 1713. According to Tartini's account given to the French astronomer Jérôme Lalande, he dreamed that he had made a pact with the devil, to whom he had handed a violin after a music lesson, in order to assess whether the devil could play. The devil then proceeded to play "with such great art and intelligence, as I had never even conceived in my boldest flights of fantasy".

Tartini said that on waking he "immediately grasped my violin in order to retain, in part at least, the impression of my dream".

=== "O Little Town of Bethlehem" ===
American musician Lewis Redner wrote "St. Louis", the melody to which the Christmas carol "O Little Town of Bethlehem" is most commonly sung in the United States, in December 1868 at the request of Episcopal clergyman and author Phillips Brooks, who had written the lyrics. Redner had not yet written the tune on the night before he was scheduled to rehearse it. According to Redner's account, he "was roused from sleep late in the night hearing an angel-strain whispering in my ear, and seizing a piece of music paper I jotted down the treble of the tune as we now have it, and on Sunday morning before going to church I filled in the harmony."

=== "(I Can't Get No) Satisfaction" ===
Keith Richards claimed to have dreamed the riff to the 1965 song "(I Can't Get No) Satisfaction". He ran through it once before falling asleep. He said when he listened back to it in the morning, there was about two minutes of acoustic guitar before you could hear him drop the pick and "then me snoring for the next forty minutes".

=== "Yesterday" ===
Paul McCartney claimed to have dreamed the melody to his song "Yesterday" (1965). After he woke up, he thought it was just a vague memory of some song he heard when he was younger. As it turned out that he had completely thought up this song all by himself, he recorded it and it became the most covered pop song in the world.

=== "Black Sabbath" ===
While the band was previously named "Earth", Geezer Butler wrote Black Sabbath's eponymous song "Black Sabbath", after a nightmare in which he had encountered a tall black figure at the edge of his bed, gazing at him. After he woke up, the book on the occult he had been reading prior to the nightmare had mysteriously vanished from his room. He later told the band about his experience and recorded the song using a haunting riff and a tritone.

Named after a 1963 Boris Karloff film, "Black Sabbath" became one of the band's most popular songs, and they even named their debut album and the band itself after it. In 2023, Rolling Stone ranked "Black Sabbath" as the greatest heavy metal song of all time.

=== "Let It Be" ===
Paul McCartney has also claimed that the idea of "Let It Be" came to him after a dream he had about his late mother during the tense period surrounding the sessions for The Beatles ("the White Album") in 1968. McCartney later said: "It was great to visit with her again. I felt very blessed to have that dream. So that got me writing 'Let It Be'." In a later interview, McCartney said that in the dream his mother had told him, "It will be all right, just let it be."

=== "The Prophet's Song" ===
Brian May said that he was inspired to write the 1975 Queen track "The Prophet's Song" after a hepatitis-induced fever dream he had about an apocalyptic flood. It is the longest Queen song with vocals.

=== Selected Ambient Works Volume II ===
Richard James, who performs as Aphex Twin, has written several ambient tracks while lucid dreaming, saying that:

Melodies were easy to remember. I'd go to sleep in my studio. I'd go to sleep for ten minutes and write three tracks—only small segments, not 100 percent finished tracks. I'd wake up and I'd only been asleep for ten minutes. That's quite mental. I vary the way I do it, dreaming either I'm in my studio, entirely the way it is, or all kinds of variations. The hardest thing is getting the sounds the same. It's never the same. It doesn't really come close to it.

James says that seventy per cent of his 1994 album Selected Ambient Works Volume II was written while lucid dreaming.

=== The Dark Carnival ===
Violent J, a member of Insane Clown Posse, claimed to have dreamed the concept of The Dark Carnival, a traveling carnival full of spirits, which is described in much of their discography.

=== "1000 Oceans" ===
Singer-songwriter Tori Amos has explained that the idea for the song "1000 Oceans", from her 1999 album To Venus and Back, came to her in a dream. An old African woman was humming the melody to her, and she got up around 5:30 in the morning to record it.

=== "It Could Be Better" ===
Artist Left at London stated in a 2022 TikTok video that she first heard the hook of her song "It Could Be Better" from her album T.I.A.P.F.Y.H. in a dream where "the cast of High School Musical sang it at [her]".

=== Hit em ===
In a tweet from July 2024, Drew Daniel of electronic music duo Matmos described a fictional music genre he encountered in a dream entitled "hit em". Recounted to him by a nondescript woman in the dream, the genre is a type of electronic music "with super crunched out sounds" in a 5/4 time signature with a tempo of 212 beats per minute. Following the tweet, numerous artists have tried their hand at creating hit em tracks.

=== Through This Fire Across from Peter Balkan ===
Artist John Darnielle has stated that the title and concept for The Mountain Goats' album Through This Fire Across from Peter Balkan came to him in a dream.

=== "Dizz Knee Land" ===
In a 1992 interview with the Westwood One radio program On the Edge, Dada bassist Joie Calio recalled dreaming of the melody to their hit "Dizz Knee Land," saying that:

I got the idea for the song in a dream where I saw this word 'Disneyland' on a bus. I heard the melody and then I woke up, wrote it all down and called Mike up to finish it up.

=== "Gyroscope" ===
Marcus Eoin of Scottish electronic music duo Boards of Canada has said of the track "Gyroscope" from their 2002 album Geogaddi that: "I dreamed the sound of it, and although I've recreated dreamt songs before, I managed to do that one so quickly that the end result was 99% like my dream. It spooks me to listen to it now."

== Film and television ==
=== 3 Women ===
Director Robert Altman conceived of his 1977 film 3 Women during a restless sleep while his wife was in the hospital. He dreamt that he was directing a film starring Shelley Duvall and Sissy Spacek in an identity theft story, against a desert backdrop. He based the film on this dream, although additional story details were added later.

=== The Terminator ===
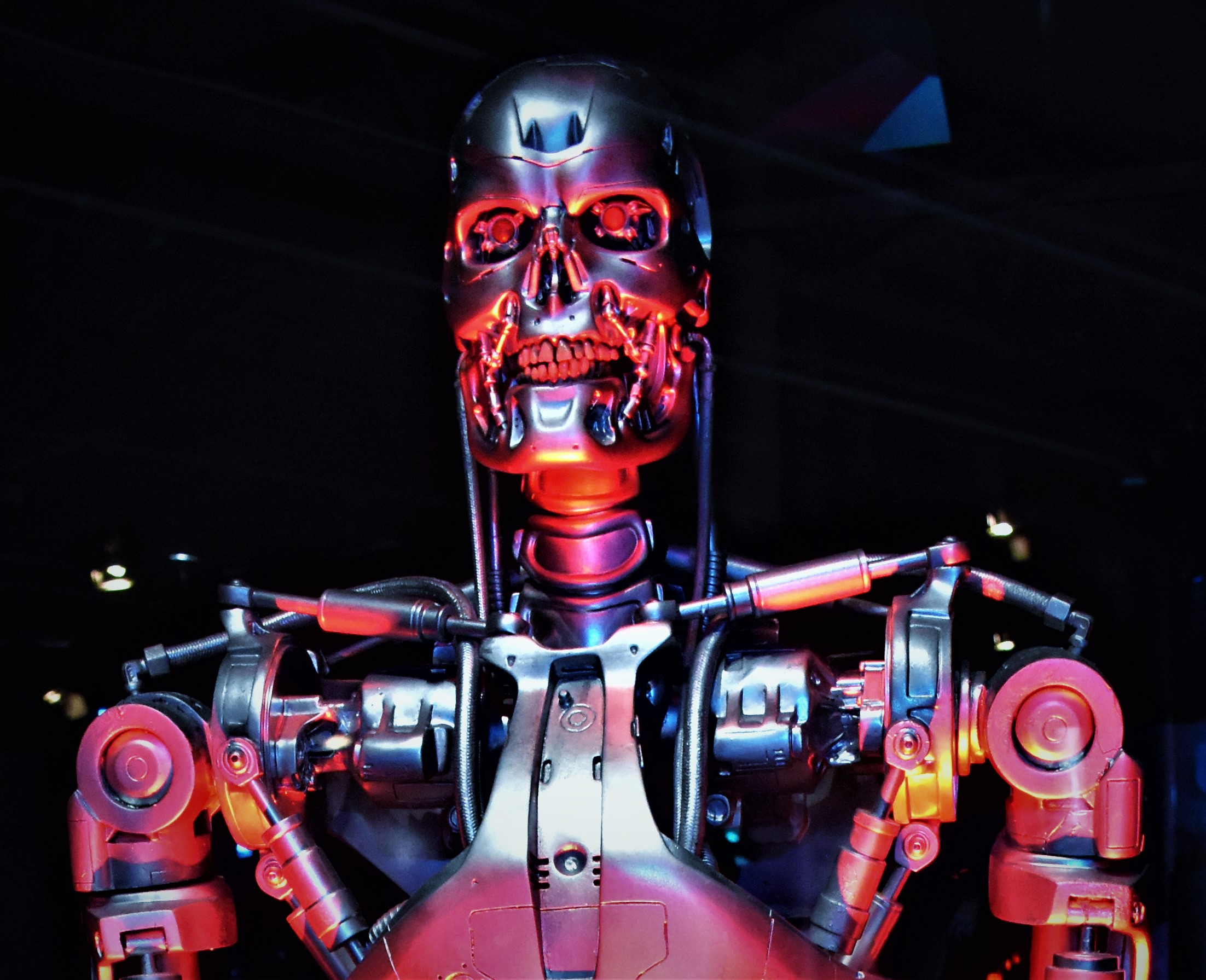
The character of The Terminator

Director James Cameron said the titular character in The Terminator (1984) was inspired by a dream he had under the influence of a soaring fever he suffered while he was "sick and dead broke" in Rome, Italy, during the final cut of Piranha II. He dreamed of "a chrome skeleton emerging from a fire", and made some sketches on hotel stationery upon waking:

The first sketch I did showed a metal skeleton cut in half at the waist, crawling over a tile floor, using a large kitchen knife to pull itself forward while reaching out with the other hand. In a second drawing, the character is threatening a crawling woman. Minus the kitchen knife, these images became the finale of The Terminator almost exactly.

=== Over the Garden Wall ===
Chapter 5 of the miniseries Over the Garden Wall (2014), "Mad Love", was inspired by a dream that show creator Patrick McHale had. In the events of the dream, McHale was house hunting and came across a secret library in one of the houses. As he explored further, he realized that he had entered someone else's home. In the episode, the character Quincy Endicott explores his mansion and discovers that he has entered the mansion of his neighbour.

== Video games and software ==
=== Deltarune ===
In an interview conducted a few months after the release of its first chapter, Toby Fox stated that the idea for his episodic videogame Deltarune came from a dream he experienced while bedridden from a fever seven years prior. According to Fox, the dream depicted the emotionally-moving ending to a game that did not exist; upon waking up, he was determined to make the game into a reality.

=== Omori ===
In a video discussing the creation of the 2020 game Omori, developer Omocat describes the game's liminal space area - White Space - as being inspired by a dream they experienced when in high school of "standing in a white room with nothing in it... Something red and blurry appeared in front of me... a giant floating rectangular button with the word 'Live' written across it, just like a video game interface. And... when I pressed it, I woke up."

Other aspects of the game were influenced by lucid dreams the developer had experienced. They said that "I would try to escape them through death, by for instance, jumping into a lake. It's all pretty creepy stuff that probably influenced the game quite a bit."

=== Salesforce ===
The user interface of Salesforce, a widely used enterprise software platform founded in 1999, was inspired by a dream of its co-founder Marc Benioff. Benioff envisioned an application interface resembling that of Amazon, which included labeled tabs. Benioff said that in his dream:

I could see this app that looked like Amazon and it said 'Contacts', 'Accounts', 'Opportunities', 'Forecast Reports', as tabs. No one had ever built enterprise software quite like that before.

== Science and invention ==
=== Descartes' new science ===
It is thought that three separate dreams had by Descartes on November 10, 1619, may have led him to the basis of a new philosophy, the scientific method. Sociologist Lewis Samuel Feuer considers modern philosophy to have been "born during the night of Descartes' three dreams".

In Descartes' first dream, a great wind pushed him along the street to a chapel. In the second dream, a sharp noise caused him to wake and briefly see sparks of fire in his room; biographer Adrien Baillet says that Descartes perceived this as "a sign of the Spirit of Truth which descended on him to possess him". In his third dream, he opened a book and read Ausonius's verse Quod vitae sectabor iter? ("What path shall I follow in life?"), before searching for a poem called Est & Non ("It Is and Is Not"), and browsing an incomplete dictionary. Realising that he was dreaming, he interpreted the poetry as philosophy and wisdom, and the dictionary as science. After waking, he considered Est & Non to refer to truth and falsity in the secular sciences.

Modern sleep researchers speculate that Descartes may have experienced exploding head syndrome, a phenomenon which had not been described at the time.

=== Periodic table ===
The chemist Dmitri Mendeleev is said to have invented the modern periodic table in a dream "where all the elements fell into place as required." Mendeleev, a chemistry professor and an avid player of the card game solitaire, had been attempting to clearly organize the elements, which at the time were grouped either by atomic weight or by common properties. In solitaire, however, cards are arranged both by suit, horizontally, and by number, vertically. After three days of nonstop attempts to invent the periodic table, Mendeleev is said to have fallen asleep, whereupon he promptly dreamt its structure.

=== Sewing machine ===
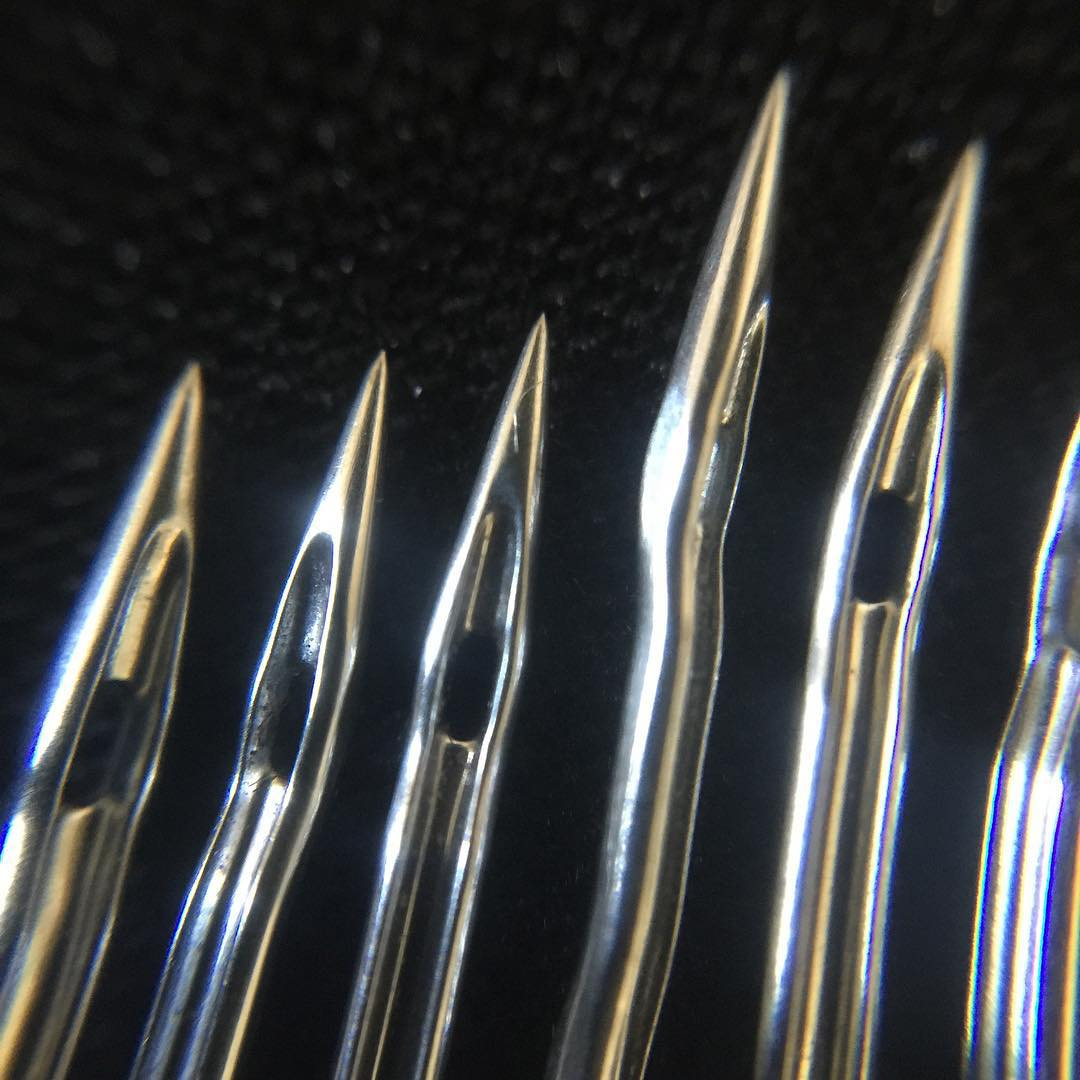
Modern sewing machine needles, with the eyes near to their points

There is a possibly apocryphal account of Elias Howe inventing the needle of the modern lockstitch sewing machine in a dream. A traditional needle has its eye at its base, but Howe was supposedly inspired by a dream to instead position the eye at the point, as recorded in the history of his mother's family:

[Howe] dreamed he was building a sewing machine for a savage king in a strange country. Just as in his actual working experience, he was perplexed about the needle's eye. He thought the king gave him twenty-four hours in which to complete the machine and make it sew. If not finished in that time death was to be the punishment. Howe worked and worked, and puzzled, and finally gave it up. Then he thought he was taken out to be executed. He noticed that the warriors carried spears that were pierced near the head. Instantly came the solution of the difficulty, and while the inventor was begging for time, he awoke. It was 4 o'clock in the morning. He jumped out of bed, ran to his workshop, and by 9, a needle with an eye at the point had been crudely modeled. After that it was easy.

=== Structure of benzene ===
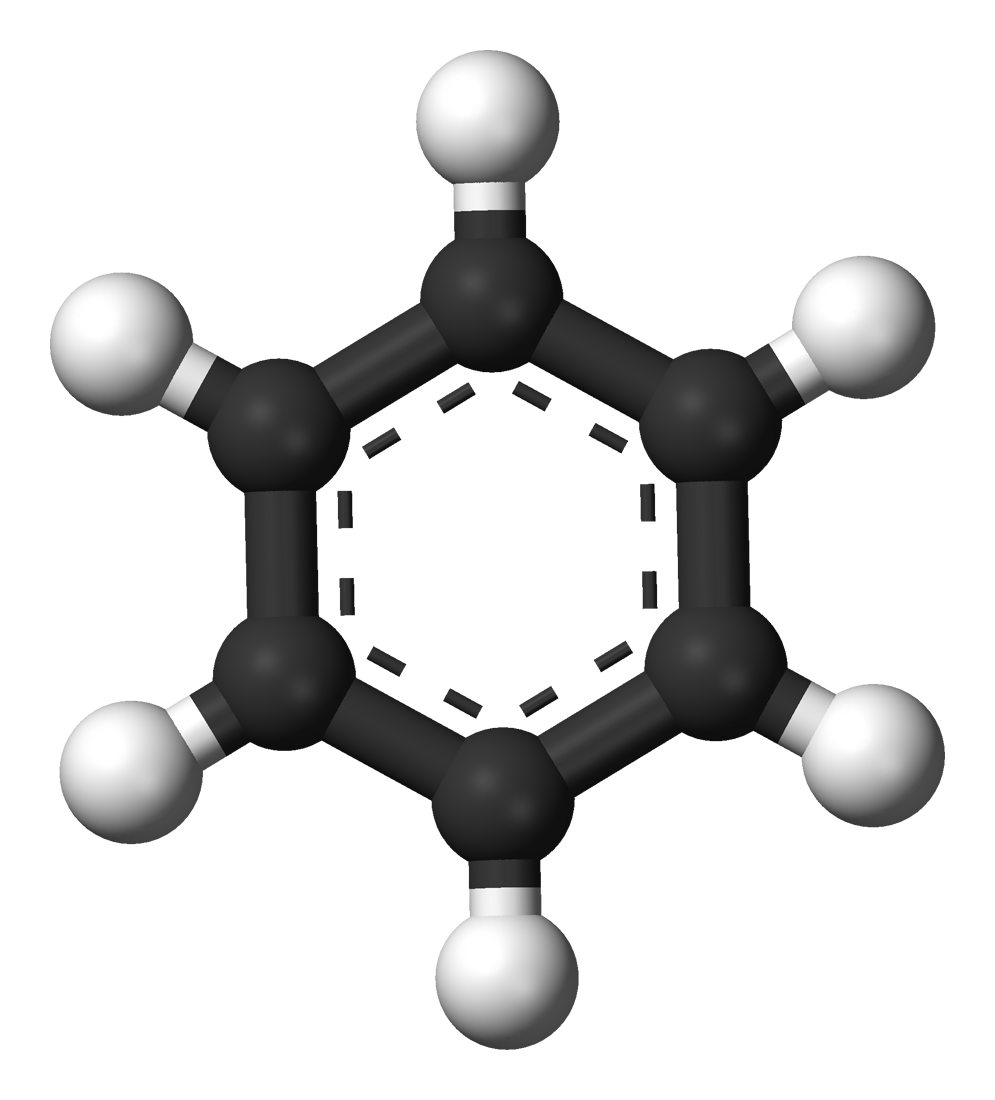
The chemical structure of benzene

The scientist Friedrich August Kekulé discovered the seemingly impossible chemical structure of benzene (C_{6}H_{6}) after he had a dream of a group of snakes swallowing their tails.

=== Structure of the atom ===
Niels Bohr won the Nobel Prize for Physics in 1922 for his discovery of the structure of the atom. He recalled that the electrons revolving around the nucleus, like the Solar System, came to him in a dream. Upon testing his "dream" hypothesis, he was able to discover that the atomic structure was, in fact, similar to it.

=== Ramanujan's mathematical revelations ===
Indian mathematician Srinivasa Ramanujan, known for his substantial contributions to number theory, analysis and other areas of pure mathematics, claimed that Hindu goddess Namagiri Thayar would bestow him with mathematical insights in his dreams and that in these visions, "scrolls containing the most complicated mathematics used to unfold before his eyes."

=== Neurotransmission ===
Before Otto Loewi's work, there was debate on whether neurotransmission was primarily chemical or electrical. The night before Easter Sunday, Loewi dreamed a perfect experimental setup. His dream involved two chambers with beating hearts, one with its nerves intact and the other without. These chambers would be filled with solution and connected with a tube. The experimenter would electrically stimulate the first heart, causing it to beat slower. If neurotransmission was primarily electrical, there would be no reason for the second heart to slow down. However, if neurotransmission was chemical, then the chemicals could theoretically float down the tube and slow down the second heart in the other chamber as well.

Loewi wrote this idea down but could not decipher his own writing when he awoke in the morning. The next night, the dream came to him again. Working with Henry Dale, Loewi would go on to use this experimental setup to demonstrate chemical neurotransmission and win the Nobel Prize for it in 1936.

=== Smart card ===
Roland Moreno claimed to have thought of the smart card concept in a dream, telling France Soir in a 2006 interview, "I came up with the idea in my sleep... To be honest, I'm a lazy bum and my productivity is on the feeble side." Moreno patented the idea in 1974.

== Food ==
=== Corn flakes ===
The 1894 invention of corn flakes is disputed, with different accounts offered by the Kellogg brothers. While Will Keith Kellogg claimed to have discovered the flaking process by accident after unintentionally leaving a batch for several days, his brother John Harvey Kellogg attributed his own invention of the process to a dream he had had, saying in a 1927 lecture that:

While I was hunting for a solution of the problem I was one night awakened about three o'clock in the morning by a telephone call. After answering the telephone, as I was returning to bed the thought occurred to me that the dream I was dreaming when I was awakened was an important one and that I should endeavor to gather up the threads and finish it, which I did, and with the result when I awakened in the morning I knew how to make cereal flakes.

=== King's Hand ===
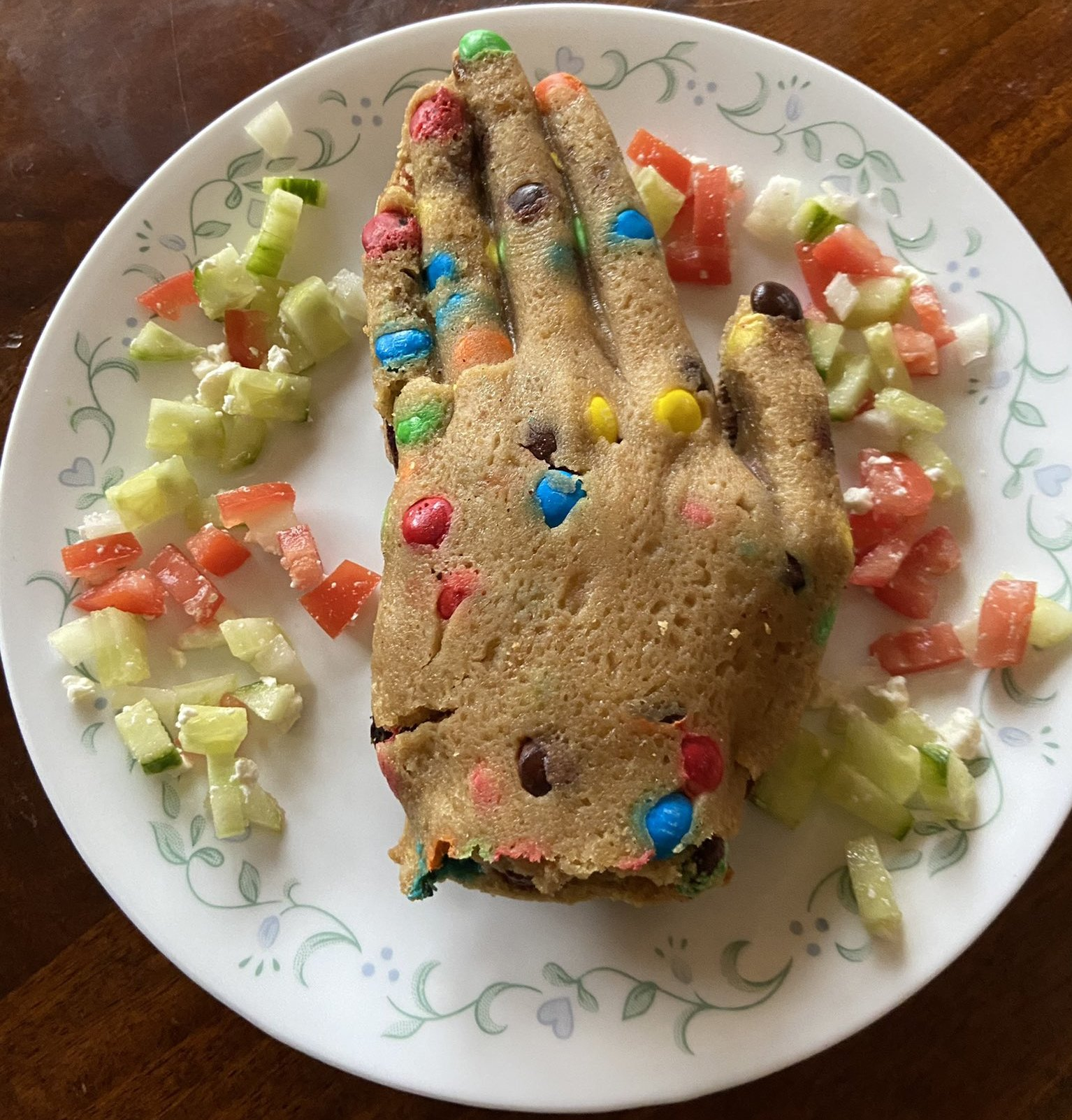
The King's Hand

King's Hand is a dessert made of M&M's and cookie dough, molded into the shape of a hollow hand and baked, before being filled with Greek salad. It was invented by a 28-year-old data analyst, who says the idea for the dish came to her in a dream in which it was the main course of a festival feast. After a week of experimentation, she posted a series of photos on Twitter on December 6, 2020. Later that day, she shared her recipe. As of December 15, 2020, the tweet had garnered over 166,000 likes and was featured in a diverse array of media and print publications, including Fox News, TODAY, and BuzzFeed News. The original post inspired people to make their own versions, as well as descriptions of foods that had appeared in others' dreams.

== Languages ==
=== Volapük ===
Logo of the constructed language Volapük

The Volapük language was created by Johann Martin Schleyer (1831–1912), after dreaming that God had told him to create an international language.

=== Pau Cin Hau Script ===
The religious leader Pau Cin Hau created the Pau Cin Hau script based on a series of dreams he had between 1900-1902. In these dreams, Pathian, a creator god of the Chin people, taught him various symbols and told him to preach to the Chin people that Pathian is the only god they should worship.

== See also ==
- Recurring dream
- Tetris effect
- Dream art § Notable works directly based on dreams
