= Blood Music (record label) =

- Founded: 2011
- Status: Inactive (c. 2021)
- Genre: Heavy metal; Synthwave
- Country of origin: Finland
- Location: Helsinki
- Official website: blood-music.com

Blood Music is an independent record label specializing in heavy metal and synthwave music, based in Helsinki, Finland. Founded in 2011, the label first focused on reissues of underground acts from the extreme metal scene, before finding success in synthwave. Blood Music was also a one-time video game publisher, publishing the PC game VirtuaVerse in 2020. The label ultimately ended active operations c. 2021.

== History ==
Blood Music was founded in Helsinki, Finland in 2011; the founder, a native of Porvoo, Finland, was inspired by his frustration with acquiring out-of-print vinyl records. Blood Music's early productions were vinyl reissues of previous extreme metal releases, towards the stated goal of cultural preservation. HEAVY Magazine characterized this as part of the vinyl revival. The label released Strapping Young Lad's full discography as a vinyl box set in April 2013, which was the first vinyl pressing for the band's 1995 debut, Heavy as a Really Heavy Thing, as well as for the 2003 SYL and 2005 The New Black.

Beginning with signing Perturbator in 2014 for his release of Dangerous Days, Blood Music began to pivot into synthwave, particularly the subgenre darksynth that had cross-genre appeal with metalheads; other synthwave sign-ons included Dan Terminus, Dynatron and GosT.

In 2014, the label released a box set of Moonsorrow's discography on 14 LPs, billed by Metal Hammer as the "biggest metal box set ever." In 2016, the label released a box set of the full discography of Norwegian black metal band Emperor, totalling 24 LPs and one 7-inch, billed as the "largest vinyl box set in extreme metal history" by Decibel.

In 2020, Blood Music published a video game, the PC game VirtuaVerse, made in collaboration with one of their signed acts, Master Boot Record.

=== Inactivity ===
On December 30th, 2018, Blood Music announced an intent to end active operations by their 10-year anniversary in 2021, citing the strain on the founder; the label committed to honor signers' previously agreed upon releases. As of October 2026, Blood Music has maintained their registration as a company in Finland.

== Roster ==
- Abigail Williams (2019)
- Astronoid (Note: Treppel 2017)
- Carbon Based Lifeforms
- Chaos Moon
- Dan Terminus
- Dynatron
- GosT
- Kauan
- Master Boot Record
- Öxxö Xööx
- Perturbator
- Serdce
