= Gamma Knife (album) =

Album by Kayo Dot

Studio album by Kayo Dot
- Released: January 4, 2012
- Recorded: October–late 2011
- Venues: Littlefield, Brooklyn, New York (October 5)
- Genres: Avant-garde metal, avant-rock, black metal
- Length: 30:36
- Label: Ice Level Music
- Producers: Toby Driver, Randall Dunn

Kayo Dot chronology
Coyote (2010)	Gamma Knife (2012)	Hubardo (2013)

Gamma Knife (or Gamma Knife/Grey Dream) is the fifth studio album by American avant-garde metal band Kayo Dot. The album was self-released through frontman Toby Driver's Ice Level Music via Bandcamp on January 4, 2012, following the group's departure from Hydra Head Records. It was later released by another record company, Antithetic Records on CD and LP. The lineup remained the same, except Kim Abrams played drums on the album. Gamma Knife was received critically better than the past few albums, as SputnikMusic gave it a 3.5/5 and said "for the first time in years, Kayo Dot feels musically relevant."

The bulk of the album was recorded live at Brooklyn, New York venue Littlefield on October 5, 2011, with the remainder recorded at Driver's residence in late 2011. It was mixed by longtime producer Randall Dunn. It is notable for beginning the return to Driver's metal roots and harsh vocals used in Choirs of the Eye. The vinyl and CD copies are both available via the group's Bandcamp.

== Track listing ==
All songs written by Toby Driver. Lyrics written by Jason Byron and Toby Driver.

Gamma Knife track listing
No.	Title	Length
1.	"Lethe"	5:05
2.	"Rite of Goetic Evocation"	6:40
3.	"Mirror Water, Lightning Night"	5:33
4.	"Ocellated God"	6:32
5.	"Gamma Knife"	6:46

== Credits ==
- Toby Driver – vocals, bass guitar, guitar, keyboards
- Terran Olson – alto saxophone
- Daniel Means – alto saxophone
- Kim Abrams – drums
- Mia Matsumiya – violin
- Tim Byrnes – Mellotron
- David Bodie – percussion
