= Chuck Stern =

American musician, writer, and artist

- Born: Charles Baker Stern; June 22, 1979; New York City, New York, U.S.
- Died: December 10, 2023 (aged 44)
- Instruments: Vocals; keyboards; multi-instrumentalist
- Member of: Time of Orchids, Sculptress, Stern
- Website: sterntheband.bandcamp.com/music

Charles Baker Stern (June 22, 1979 – December 10, 2023) was an American composer, musician, writer, and visual artist known for his work in experimental music. He was frontman and composer of Time of Orchids, played in Sculptress, and released solo and band works under the name Stern. He was born and lived in New York City. He died on December 10, 2023, at the age of 44.

== Career ==
Stern was a programmer for public-access television station Manhattan Neighborhood Network. He co-created Roboshithead, which The Village Voice called "the best public access show in New York," and It Changed :(, which won the 2011 Hometown Video Original Teleplay Award.

From 1999 to 2007, Stern was the frontman and composer for experimental band Time of Orchids. Over the band's tenure, its lineup included Eric Fitzgerald, Jesse Krakow, David Bodie, Kim Abrams, Will Redmond, and Charlie Looker, with guest performances from Tim Byrnes, Maryanna Hansen, jazz pianist Marilyn Crispell, Kate Pierson of The B-52's, and Julee Cruise of Twin Peaks. Time of Orchids released six albums; two were self-released, with others appearing on Relapse, Epicene, Tzadik, and Cuneiform.

In 2008, Stern and Charlie Looker formed a duo project, Sculptress.

Also in 2008, after announcing the end of Time of Orchids, Stern began a new solo project releasing music under his last name. "Stern" eventually grew into a quartet including former Kayo Dot members Abrams, Byrnes, and Toby Driver, with releases by the band formation including Bone Turquoise (New Atlantis, 2015) and Missive: Sister Ships (Sleeping Giant Glossolalia, 2018).

Stern later returned to solo project status with Sunder Hawk (2020). The album features guest performances from Abrams, Erin Mount, and Stern's mother, Ellen Stern, who died in 2023. Stern's final release was Black Votive (2022).

== Discography ==
=== As leader ===
Year	Artist	Title	Label	Personnel
2001	Time of Orchids	Melonwhisper	Relapse / Aquarius	Stern, Charlie Looker, Will Redmond, Jesse Krakow, Kim Abrams ft. guest Marilyn Crispell
2003	Time of Orchids	Much Too Much Fun		Stern, Krakow, Abrams, Eric Fitzgerald, ft. guest Kate Pierson
2004	Time of Orchids	Early As Seen in Pace	Epicene	Stern, Krakow, Abrams, Eric Fitzgerald
2005	Time of Orchids	Sarcast While	Tzadik	Stern, Krakow, Fitzgerald, David Bodie ft. guests Tim Byrnes, Maryanna Hansen, Julee Cruise
2007	Time of Orchids	Namesake Caution	Cuneiform	Stern, Krakow, Fitzgerald, Bodie
2010	Time of Orchids	In Due Time		Stern, Krakow, Abrams, Fitzgerald, Bodie, Looker
2010	Stern	Dredge Up Eventide		Stern ft. guests Byrnes, Victoria Kereszi
2010	Stern	The Largo Sanctum		Stern ft. guests Laura Vickers, Ian Garrick-Bethell, Katie Stern, Wendell Edwards
2011	Stern	Path X		Stern ft. guest Looker
2012	Stern	Entitlement		Stern, Abrams, Byrnes, Toby Driver
2015	Stern	Bone Turquoise	New Atlantis	Stern, Abrams, Byrnes, Driver
2018	Stern	Missive: Sister Ships	Sleeping Giant Glossolalia	Stern, Abrams, Byrnes, Driver
2020	Stern	Sunder Hawk		Stern ft. guests Abrams, Erin Mount, Ellen Stern
2022	Stern	Black Votive		Stern
