= Nonoko Yoshida =

New York–based Japanese saxophonist

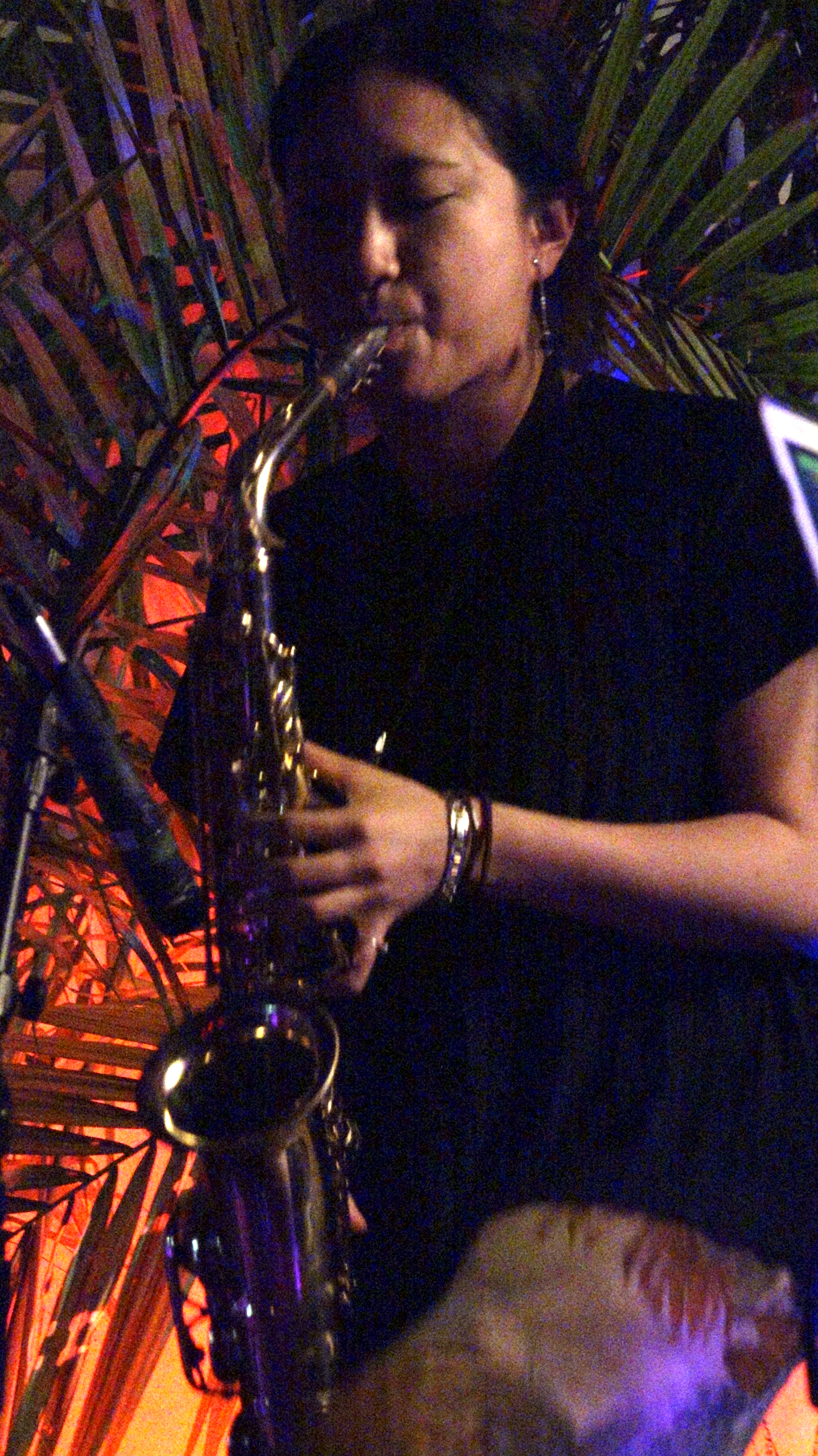
Nonoko Yoshida at 2014 Trans-Pecos Festival

Nonoko Yoshida (吉田野乃子, Yoshida Nonoko) is a New York City based Japanese saxophonist. She is a member of Pet Bottle Ningen, and has also played with Ron Anderson's PAK and Yoshida Tatsuya. She has also worked with John Zorn. Her solo work in 2015 was received well.

== Discography ==
- Lotus

=== with Pet Bottle Ningen ===
- Pet Bottle Ningen
- Non-Recyclable

=== with PAK ===
- NYJPN (with Tatsuya Yoshida)

=== with Eighty-pound Pug ===
- speechless

=== other collaboration ===
- DEN SVARTA FANAN [JOE MEROLLA/RON ANDERSON/NONOKO YOSHIDA/WEASEL WALTER]
