= Gregor Samsa (disambiguation) =

Gregor Samsa is the protagonist of Franz Kafka's novella The Metamorphosis.

Gregor Samsa may also refer to:

- Gregor Samsa (band), an American post-rock band
  - Gregor Samsa (EP), the band's 2002 debut EP
- "Gregor Samsa", a 2015 song by Momus from Glyptothek
