= Sixty Metonymies =

Studio album by Tartar Lamb
- Released: July 31, 2007
- Recorded: 2006–2007
- Genre: Avant-garde music Experimental rock Minimalist music
- Length: 41:12
- Label: Ice Level Music (self-released)
- Producer: Toby Driver

Tartar Lamb chronology
Sixty Metonymies (2007)	Polyimage of Known Exits (2011)

Sixty Metonymies is the debut studio album of New York City-based avant-garde band Tartar Lamb. The album is essentially one 40-minute composition for a guitar-violin duo.

== Track listing ==
All tracks composed by Toby Driver

1. "Incensing the Malediction Is a Lamb" (11:47)
2. "A Lamb in Hand's Worth Two in the Ewe" (3:13)
3. "Trumpet Twine the Lamb Unhyne" (9:36)
4. "The Lamb, the Ma'am, and the Holy Shim-Sham" (16:38)

== Personnel ==
- Toby Driver – electric guitar, synth bass, vocals
- Mia Matsumiya – violin

=== Guest musicians ===
- Tim Byrnes – trumpet
- Andrew Greenwald – percussion, laptop
