= Stefan Zeniuk =

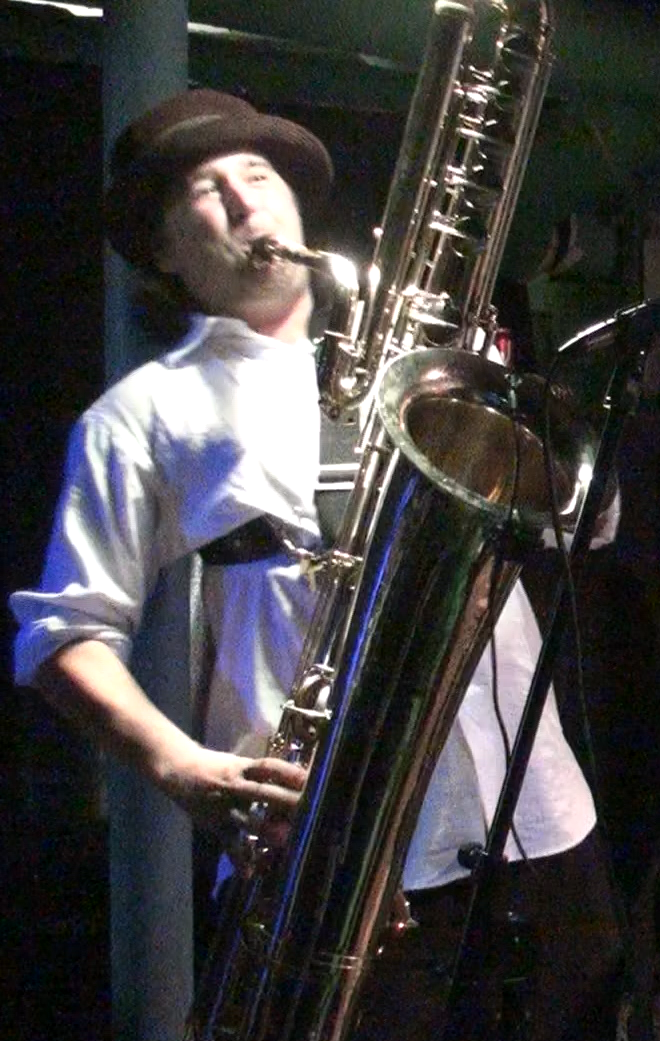

Brooklyn, New York, December 2007

Stefan Zeniuk is a New York City based musician and filmmaker. Often seen performing on the saxophones, clarinet, and bass clarinet he is noted for his stage presence. He currently heads up Gato Loco, and is also a member of Maxim Bass with Ron Anderson and Glenn Johnson.

An interpreter of Latin music, Zeniuk was often seen performing with such notables as baritone/slide guitarist/multi-instrumentalist Clifton Hyde as well as low brass virtuoso Joe Exley (tuba) and his long-standing band Gato Loco.

He occasionally performs with the band Tinpan. He also featured on the Secret Curve album by PAK.

He also participated in the "Mute Button" project by Improv Everywhere and performed with Scott Bradlee's Postmodern Jukebox.
