= Jérôme Noetinger =

Improviser and composer of electroacoustic music

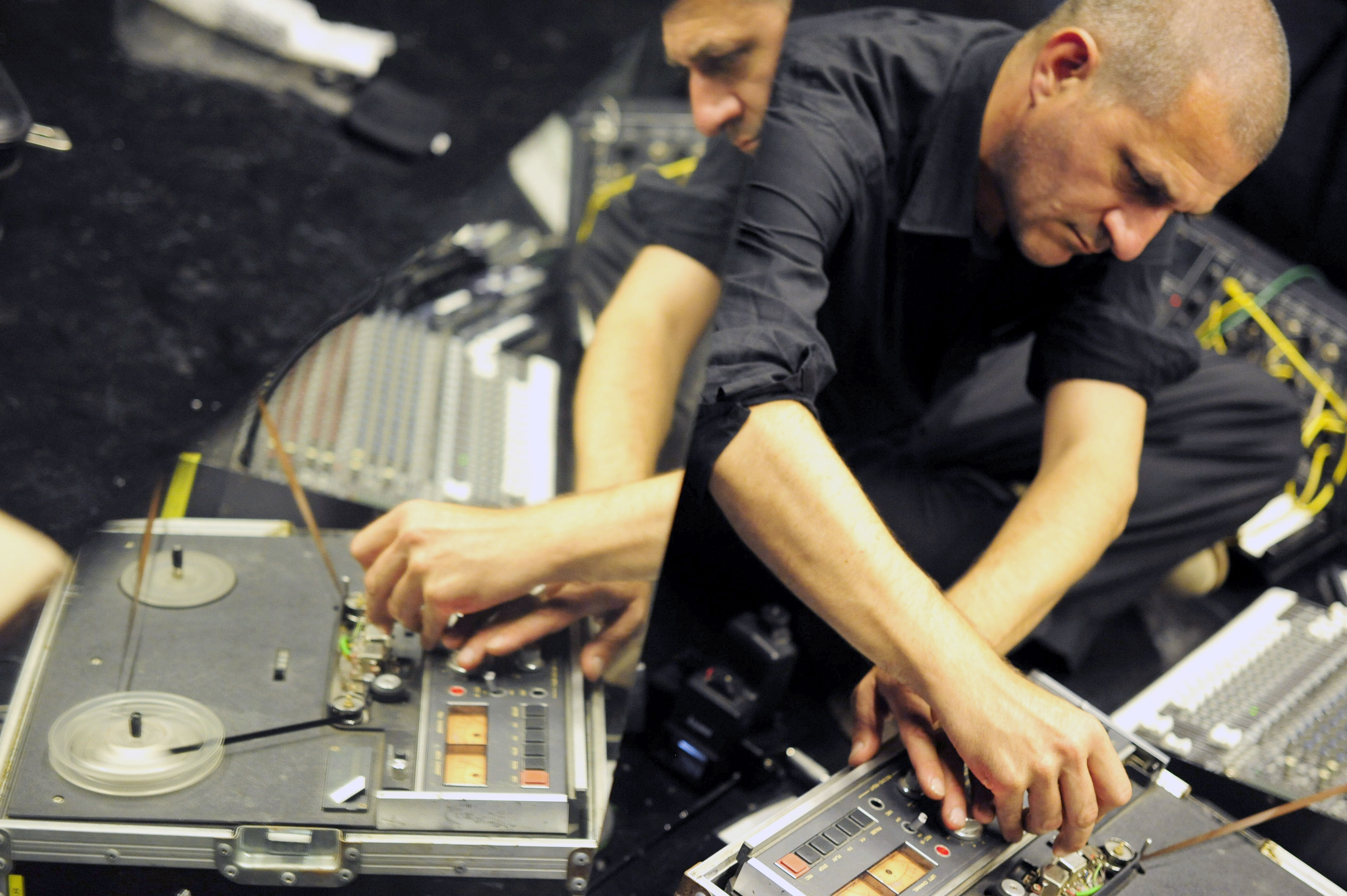
Jérôme Noetinger

Jérôme Noetinger (born 1966 in Marseille) is an improviser and composer of electroacoustic music based in Rives, Isère, France.

He also runs the record label and record distributor Metamkine and writes in the French magazine Revue et corrigée. He features on the album Secret Curve by Ron Anderson's PAK on John Zorn's Tzadik label.
