= Toby Driver =

American musician

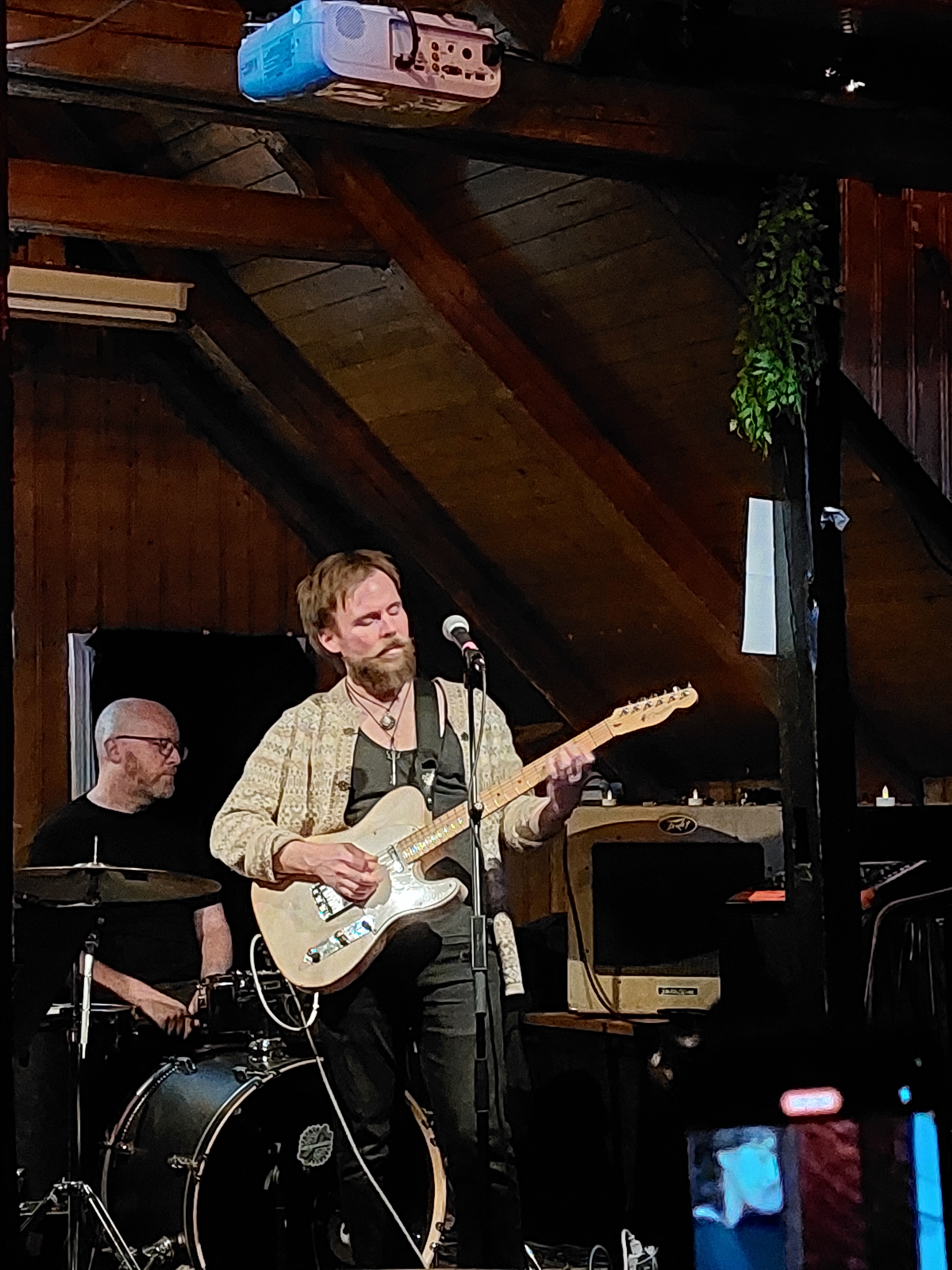
- Toby Driver in Reykjavík, Iceland in April 2025

Background information
- Born: September 29, 1978 (age 47); Meriden, Connecticut, U.S.
- Genres: Avant-garde, experimental
- Occupations: Musician, singer, songwriter
- Instruments: Vocals; guitar; bass guitar; keyboards; synthesizers; clarinet; drums; percussion
- Member of: Kayo Dot, Alora Crucible, Bloodmist
- Formerly of: maudlin of the Well
- Website: tobydriver.com

Toby Driver is a multi-instrumentalist, composer, songwriter, producer, label owner, and solo and visual artist, best known for his work as leader of the experimental bands Kayo Dot and Maudlin of the Well. As bandleader, Driver performs lead vocals and many instruments, writes and arranges the music, produces the albums, and creates the majority of the album artwork.

== Early life and education ==
Toby Driver was born in 1978, in Meriden, Connecticut. He learned clarinet and piano from a young age, and during his high school years, he recorded several albums under the moniker "Spoonion" using tape recorders and a karaoke machine. He later released his favorite cuts of these albums online as collections. After playing with a handful of bands in high school, including a Nirvana and Jane's Addiction cover band, and a gothic-progressive-metal band called Celestial Providence, Driver formed maudlin of the Well with his friends Jason Byron and Greg Massi and recorded a demo entitled Through Languid Veins (1996).

He attended Hampshire College in Amherst, MA, where he expanded Maudlin of the Well, and where they recorded their second (Begat of the Haunted Oak... An Acorn), third (Odes to Darksome Spring), and fourth (For My Wife) demos which turned into their debut album My Fruit Psychobells... A Seed Combustible. During this time, Driver also studied under composer and jazz legend Yusef Lateef, and composed, directed, and performed an oratorio for 20 musicians based on and titled after the epic poem Six Trillion Miles Before the First by Jason Byron. Sections of this piece later reappeared on motW's reunion album, Part the Second (2009).

== Career ==
=== Maudlin of the Well ===
Driver was a founding member of Maudlin of the Well in 1996 along with Jason Byron and Greg Massi. They morphed into Kayo Dot in 2003 during the process of recording what would have been motW's fourth album, and titled Kayo Dot's henceforth first album Choirs of the Eye, due to label problems and the desire to avoid being pigeonholed in the metal scene. In 2009, due to fan requests and contributions, Driver and Terran Olson reformed Maudlin of the Well to record Part the Second, reuniting with guitarists Massi, Josh Seipp-Williams, and drummer Sam Gutterman. The album contained five newly released songs, some of which were at least partially composed in the early days of the band (as far back as 1997), with lyrics co-written by Byron and Driver. The band describes their style as "astral metal," referencing Driver and Byron's interest in astral projection. Driver has stated that he used astral projection and lucid dreaming as methods to retrieve music from the subconscious. Maudlin of the Well's lyrics deal with this topic as well as ghosts and the paranormal, the occult, kabbalah, nostalgia, and betrayal. The liner notes and lyrics for companion albums Bath and Leaving Your Body Map (2001) contain a puzzle that leads to an as-yet-unknown solution.

=== Kayo Dot ===
Kayo Dot began in 2003. They have released eleven full-length albums, an EP, a few live recordings, and a handful of remixes and singles. Kayo Dot's musical style shifts constantly, but maintains a ubiquitous aesthetic of darkness, surrealism, impressionism, hallucination, melodrama, and musical technicality. Driver is the only consistent member, although some members who have left the band in the past have returned for recordings or special live performances. Kayo Dot has joined bands such as Pallbearer, Earth, Pelican, and Secret Chiefs 3 on tour, and worked with labels including John Zorn's Tzadik, Robotic Empire, Holy Roar, Aaron Turner's Hydra Head Records, Antithetic Records, The Flenser, and Driver's own imprint, Ice Level Music.

=== Tartar Lamb I and II ===
Driver formed the side project Tartar Lamb with Mia Matsumiya in 2006. Tartar Lamb did a brief US and Canada tour in January of that year, and recorded their album Sixty Metonymies with Randall Dunn in Seattle, Washington in December; the album was released in 2007.

Tartar Lamb II was created in 2009 with other members of Kayo Dot and composer and clarinetist Jeremiah Cymerman. It was named a Tartar Lamb project because the compositional method that Driver invented for Sixty Metonymies was used again for the new work, titled Polyimage of Known Exits (2011). Tartar Lamb II did a month-long European winter tour in 2010 opening for Kayo Dot, and a recording from this tour appears on the Kayo Dot/Tartar Lamb II live album, Kraków (2011).

=== Vaura ===
Driver plays bass in the band Vaura, who released their debut Selenelion (2012) through Wierd Records and their second album, The Missing (2013), via Profound Lore Records. The band is fronted by writer, philosopher, Blacklist singer and Azar Swan producer Joshua Strawn, and also includes guitarist Kevin Hufnagel (of Dysrhythmia, Gorguts) and drummer Charlie Schmid. Vaura's style is an amalgam of gothic rock, progressive black-metal, and pop.

=== Stern ===
Driver played guitar in Stern, the experimental alien pop band auteured by the prolific composer, filmmaker, and writer Chuck Stern (formerly of Time of Orchids). The band included former Time of Orchids and Kayo Dot drummer Kim Abrams and frequent Driver collaborator Tim Byrnes. Stern released five albums as a solo act and three with a full band including Driver: Entitlement (2012), Bone Turquoise (2015), and Missive: Sister Ships (2018).

== Discography ==
=== As Spoonion 1 ===
- Community of Sinners
- Chiffon Gob
- Acoustic Sex
- Clone
- According to the Law
- Dreaming Winter Awake

=== As Spoonion 2 ===
- On the Thoughts and Principles of Dragons
- A Tree and Its Fruit
- Space Music
- How to Find God
- Opposition Day
- The Secret Violence of Poison

=== Maudlin of the Well ===
- Through Languid Veins (demo, 1996)
- Begat of the Haunted Oak: An Acorn (demo, 1997)
- Odes to Darksome Spring (demo, 1997)
- For My Wife (demo, 1998)
- My Fruit Psychobells...A Seed Combustible (1999)
- Bath (2001)
- Leaving Your Body Map (2001)
- The Secret Song (single, 2001)
- Part the Second (2009)

=== Kayo Dot ===
- Choirs of the Eye (2003)
- Dowsing Anemone with Copper Tongue (2006)
- Don't Touch Dead Animals (2006) (split LP with Bloody Panda)
- Blue Lambency Downward (2008)
- Champions of Sound 2008 (2009) (split double 7" with Pelican, Stove Bredsky, and Zozobra)
- Toying with the Insanities Vol. 1 (2009) (Candiria Remix album)
- Coyote (2010)
- Stained Glass EP (2010)
- Gamma Knife (2012)
- Hubardo (2013)
- Coffins on Io (2014)
- Plastic House on Base of Sky (2016)
- Blasphemy (2019)
- Moss Grew on the Swords and Plowshares Alike (2021)
- Every Rock, Every Half-Truth Under Reason (Prophecy Productions, 2025)

=== Solo work ===
- In the L..L..Library Loft (2005)
- The Pod OST (2013)
- Ichneumonidae (2014)
- Madonnawhore (2017)
- Live at Roulette, March 2017 (2017, digital only)
- They Are the Shield (2018)
- Raven, I Know That You Can Give Me Anything (2024)

=== Tartar Lamb I ===
- 60 Metonymies (2007)

=== Tartar Lamb II ===
- Polyimage of Known Exits (2011)
- Krakow (2011)

=== Piggy Black Cross ===
- Always Just Out Of R.E.A.C.H. (Robotic Eclosion After Coming Hylozoic) (2018)

=== Bloodmist ===
Jeremiah Cymerman, Mario Diaz de Leon, Driver

- Sheen (5049 Records, 2016)
- Chaos of Memory (2017 live recording)
- Phos (5049 Records, 2020)
- Arc (5049 Records, 2022)

=== Alora Crucible ===
- Thymiamatascension (2021)
- Oak Lace Apparition (2024)

=== Other appearances ===
- Tusk – The Resisting Dreamer (2007) (vocals)
- Gregor Samsa – Rest (2007) (clarinet, guitar)
- Pyramids – Pyramids (2008) (remix of "The Echo of Something Lovely")
- Gregor Samsa – Over Air (2009) (clarinet, vibraphone)
- Asva – Presence of Absences (2011) (vocals)
- Bloody Panda – Summon: Invocation (2011) (remix of "Hashira")
- Vaura - Selenelion (2012)
- Stern - Entitlement EP (2012)
- Vaura - The Missing (2013)
- Secret Chiefs 3 - Book of Souls: Folio A (2013)
- Ichneumonidae with Timba Harris & Russell Greenberg (2014, digital only)
- David T. Little & Third Coast Percussion – Haunt Of Last Nightfall (2014) (bass)
- Stern - Bone Turquoise (2015)
- Stern - Missive: Sister Ships (2018)
- Extra Life - Secular Works, Vol. 2 (2022)
- Ultraphauna - No No No No (2023)
- Extra Life - The Sacred Vowel (2024)
