= Moss Grew on the Swords and Plowshares Alike =

Studio album by Kayo Dot
- Released: October 29, 2021
- Genres: Avant-garde metal; gothic metal; doom metal; progressive metal
- Length: 58:35
- Label: Prophecy Productions
- Producer: Toby Driver

Kayo Dot chronology
Blasphemy (2019)	Moss Grew on the Swords and Plowshares Alike (2021)	Every Rock, Every Half-Truth Under Reason (2025)

Moss Grew on the Swords and Plowshares Alike is the tenth studio album by American avant-garde metal band Kayo Dot. It was released on October 29, 2021 via Prophecy Productions. It reached number 100 in the German Top 100 album charts for the first time during the week after its release, November 5, 2021. It is the first album since 2006's Dowsing Anemone With Copper Tongue to feature founding member Greg Massi.

== Critical reception ==
Professional ratings
Review scores
Source	Rating
Metal Injection	8.5/10
Marunouchi Muzik Magazine	10/10
The Elite Extremophile	92/100
MetalPerver	88/100
Lambgoat	8/10

The album was released to critical acclaim, with many celebrating the band's foray into a more doom metal-influenced sound. Metal Injection gave Moss an 8.5/10, describing it as "surreally gothic" and claiming that it "epitomizes why Kayo Dot remains a laudable one-of-a-kind project". Everything is Noise praised the album, dubbing it both "one of the best Kayo Dot records" and "a thoroughly amazing album" wherein "the reward is proportional with your investment".

== Track listing ==
All lyrics are written by Jason Byron; all music is composed by Toby Driver.

No.	Title	Length
1.	"The Knight Errant"	8:20
2.	"Brethren of the Cross"	8:19
3.	"Void in Virgo (The Nature of Sacrifice)"	9:10
4.	"Spectrum of One Colour"	4:56
5.	"Get Out of the Tower"	7:05
6.	"The Necklace"	8:09
7.	"Epipsychidion"	13:12

== Personnel ==
- Toby Driver – guitar, bass, synthesizers, drums, programming, vocals
- Greg Massi – guitar leads
- Jason Byron – all lyrics
