= Eve Risser =

French pianist and jazz musician

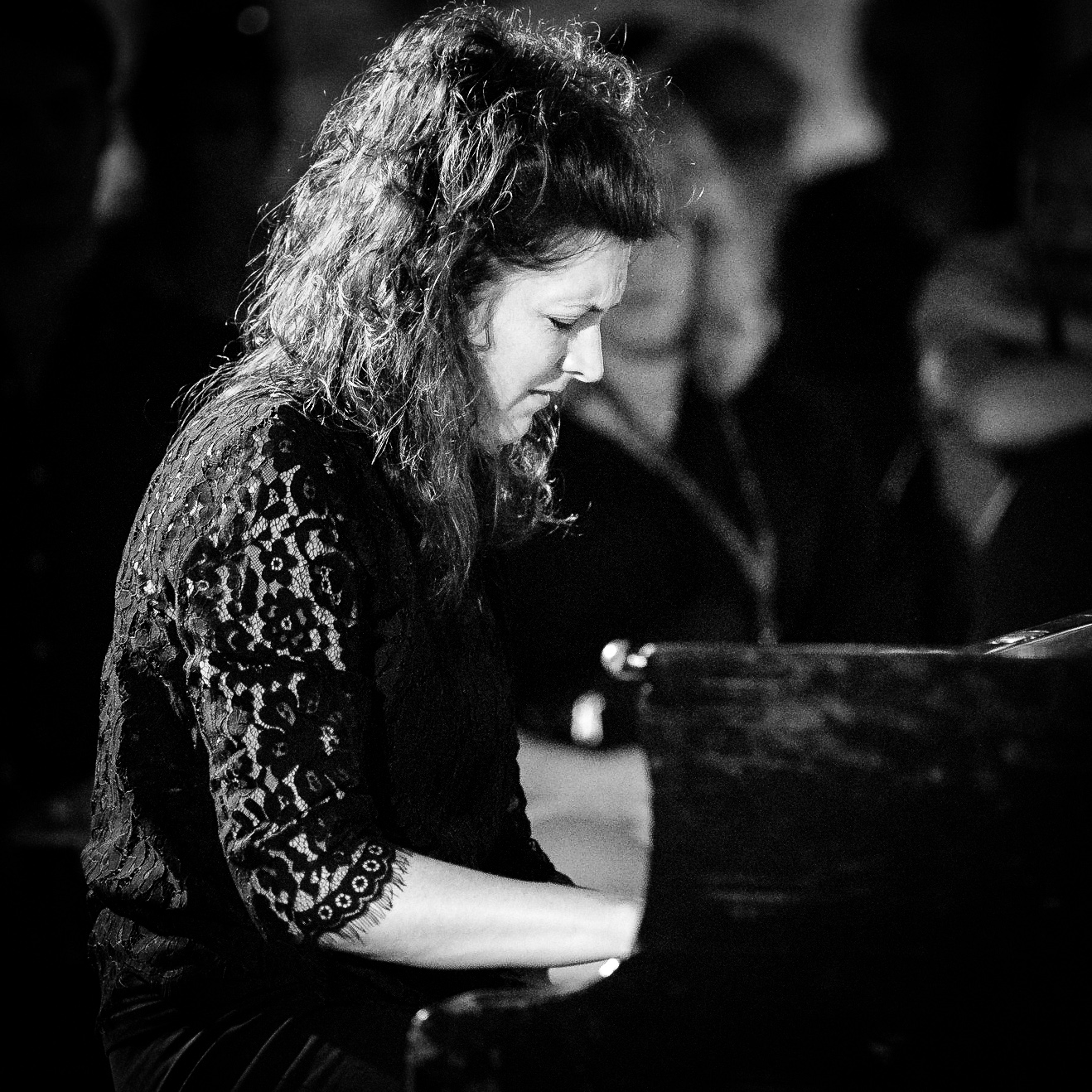
- Risser in 2018

Background information
- Born: 1982 (age 42–43); Colmar, France
- Genres: Jazz, improvised music
- Occupation(s): Musician, composer, arranger
- Instrument(s): Piano, harpsichord
- Years active: 2000s–present
- Website: everisser.com

Eve Risser (born 1982) is a French jazz and improvised music performer, composer and arranger. She mostly plays piano and prepared piano, but also plays harpsichord and other instruments.

== Life and career ==
Risser was born in 1982 in Colmar, France. She had piano lessons as a child and first saw graphic notation at the age of 11. This "set her imagination free. But those desires were quashed by her instructor, who situated that sort of interpretational freedom within a larger, rigorous practice of study."

Risser lived in Colmar until she was 18. She then studied in Strasbourg for four years, playing improvised music and jazz on the piano and contemporary music on the flute. She decided to concentrate on the piano after completing her studies. She reported that "When I stopped the flute, I felt so limited in my improvisations with timbres that I started to explore the inside of the piano to be able to imitate trumpets, percussions and saxophones [...] I realized that building stuff with my hands for the piano was super fun."

Risser was pianist in the Orchestre national de jazz from 2009 to 2013. The premiere of her White Desert, for a tentet with amateur choirs, was in March 2015.

== Playing style ==
A reviewer described her playing on the 2012 trio album En Corps as being "anything but conventional, highly percussive, full of muted strings, extended techniques, and repetitive phrases". A Down Beat reviewer of her solo piano record Des Pas Sur La Neige commented on Risser's "arsenal of techniques and tools that transform her instrument into a kaleidoscopic sound machine, producing unexpected tones and timbres."

== Discography ==
An asterisk (*) indicates that the year is that of release.

=== As leader/co-leader ===
Year recorded	Title	Label	Personnel/Notes
2007*	Ouature	Umlaut	As Donkey Monkey; duo, with Yuko Oshima (drums, vocals, samples)
2010	Split	Umlaut	Duo, with Joris Rühl (clarinet); released with recordings by OBLIQ (2) and Christof Kurzmann
2011*	Fenêtre Ovale	Umlaut	Duo, with Joris Rühl (clarinets)
2011*	Hanakana	Umlaut	As Donkey Monkey; duo, with Yuko Oshima (drums, vocals, samples)
2012*	En Corps	Dark Tree	Trio, with Benjamin Duboc (bass), Edward Perraud (drums)
2012*	A Nest at the Junction of Paths	Umlaut	As The New Songs; quartet, with Sofia Jernberg (vocals), David Stackenäs (guitar), Kim Myhr (guitars, zither)
2013	Des Pas Sur La Neige	Clean Feed	Solo piano

=== As sidewoman ===
Year recorded	Leader	Title	Label
2009*	Orchestre national de jazz	Around Robert Wyatt	Bee Jazz
2010*	Orchestre national de jazz	Shut up and Dance	Bee Jazz
2011*	PAK	Secret Curve	Tzadik
2012*	Orchestre national de jazz	Piazzolla!	Jazz Village
2013*	Orchestre national de jazz	The Party!	Jazz Village
2013*	Pascal Niggenkemper	Lucky Prime	Clean Feed
2014*	Jean-Jacques Birgé	Game Bling	
