= Tartar Lamb =

- Also known as: Tartar Lamb II
- Origin: New York City, New York, United States
- Genres: Avant-garde music Experimental rock Contemporary classical Chamber music
- Years active: 2006–present
- Spinoff of: Kayo Dot
- Members: Toby Driver; Mia Matsumiya

Tartar Lamb is an experimental avant-garde band, consisting of Toby Driver and Mia Matsumiya, both leading members of the experimental band Kayo Dot. The band originally was formed in 2006 as a means for Toby Driver to experiment with his ideas for a guitar-violin duo. The duo released their first album, Sixty Metonymies, in 2007. The band was augmented by trumpet and percussion by Tim Byrnes and Andrew Greenwald, respectively. In 2011, the band returned with their sophomore effort, Polyimage of Known Exits, under the name Tartar Lamb II. This album was funded entirely by fans via a Kickstarter project.

== Discography ==
- Sixty Metonymies (2007)
- Polyimage of Known Exits (2011)
- Krakow (2011) http://soundessence-studio.com/projects/kayo-dot-tartar-lamb-ii-krakow/

== Lineup ==
- Toby Driver (2006–present) - electric guitar
- Mia Matsumiya (2006–present) - violin, electric violin
