= NYJPN =

NYJPN is a 2014 album by Ron Anderson, Tatsuya Yoshida, and Nonoko Yoshida, under the name PAK. Popdose says "the brunt of the disc is composed of jagged-edge jazz, played in complicated times, with blasts of sax reminiscent of John Zorn".

== Track listing ==
- 1. Fail Better 2:39
- 2. Criterium Crash 0:45
- 3. L'enfer Du Nord 4:53
- 4. Breakaway 1:39
- 5. Road Rash 5:08
- 6. Spinning 1:02
- 7. Mama's Little Anarchist 2:21
- 8. Carbon Death Ride 0:58
- 9. EPO 4:38
- 10. Putting The Hammer Down 1:55
- 11. Attack, Attack 6:46
- 12. Hold The Line 0:57
- 13. Super Combatif 8:25
