= Plastic House on Base of Sky =

Studio album by Kayo Dot
- Released: June 24, 2016
- Genre: Avant-rock, electronic rock, progressive rock, gothic rock
- Length: 38:21
- Label: The Flenser
- Producer: Toby Driver

Kayo Dot chronology
Coffins on Io (2014)	Plastic House on Base of Sky (2016)	Blasphemy (2019)

Professional ratings
Review scores
Source	Rating
Exclaim!	6/10
Metal Injection	8/10
Sputnikmusic	4/5
Tiny Mix Tapes	3.5/5 stars

Plastic House on Base of Sky is the eighth studio album by American avant-garde metal band Kayo Dot. It was released on June 24, 2016 via The Flenser.

== Critical reception ==
Tiny Mix Tapes called Plastic House on Base of Sky a "fundamentally disorienting, perplexing, and haunting album." The Quietus wrote that "beneath the album’s saccharin exterior, complex structures and timbre variations soar and meld."

== Track listing ==
Music by Toby Driver. Lyrics by Jason Byron except "Brittle Urchin" by Toby Driver.

No.	Title	Length
1.	"Amalia's Theme"	7:32
2.	"All the Pain in All the Wide World"	10:08
3.	"Magnetism"	7:29
4.	"Rings of Earth"	8:40
5.	"Brittle Urchin"	4:32

== Credits ==
- Toby Driver – voice, synths, guitar, bass guitar
- Kim Abrams – drums
- Daniel Means – saxophone
- Sage Riesman – violin
- Stacey Winegyn – violin
- Bing Minz – violin
- Roman Celine – viola
- Dabe Wyche – viola
- Alexis Travelion – cello
- Landen Chelengs – contrabass
- Lemuel Bardor – harpsichord
- Bree Eng – pipe organ
- Duggan Elston – hammond organ
- Valentin Dublev – mellotron
- Charmane Tressel – glass harmonica
- Gloria Hattifer – celesta
- Bhin Turmes – trumpet
- Ephraim Narata – flugelhorn
- George Chamdles – rhodes
- Stelvio Nebulli – hand percussion
- Guillaume Veltaj – hand percussion
