= Rest (Gregor Samsa album) =

Studio album by Gregor Samsa
- Released: April 1, 2008 (digital)
- Genre: Post-rock
- Length: 47:57

Gregor Samsa chronology
55:12 (2006)	Rest (2008)

Professional ratings
Review scores
Source	Rating
AbsolutePunk.net	85% link

Rest, released April 1, 2008, is the second full-length album by Virginian post-rock band Gregor Samsa. The band posted the tracks online at Imeem before the album was released. The album was released in five formats, digital (April 1), unlimited (May 13), limited (April 24), collector's, and vinyl.

== Track listing ==
1. The Adolescent – 5:32
2. Ain Leuh – 5:28
3. Abutting, Dismantling – 6:14
4. Company – 2:19
5. Jeroen Van Aken – 8:23
6. Rendered Yards – 2:33
7. Pseudonyms – 6:13
8. First Mile, Last Mile – 7:31
9. Du Meine Leise – 3:50

== Contributors ==
- Nikki King - Voice, Piano, Rhodes, Vibraphone
- Billy Bennett - Drums, Percussion, Guitar, Bass, Vibraphone, Piano, Synth
- Champ Bennett - Piano, Voice, Guitar, Drums, Bass, Vibraphone, Mellotron, Celesta, Synth, Rhodes, String Arrangements
- Jeremiah Klinger - Baritone Guitar, Guitar, Clarinet, Piano
- Cory Bise - Bass, Baritone
- Mia Matsumiya - Violin
- Toby Driver - Clarinet, Guitar, Bass, String Arrangements
- Andrew Miller - Cello
- Alex Aldi - Synth
- Alan Weatherhead - Guitar
- Rick Alverson - Voice, Titles
- Debra Wassum - Voice
- Engineered by Alex Aldi (Gigantic) and Champ Bennett (Viking Studios & Pencil Factory)
- Mixed by Alan Weatherhead (Sound of Music)
- Mastered by Mark B. Christensen (Engine Room Audio)
