= Blue Lambency Downward =

Studio album by Kayo Dot
- Released: May 6, 2008
- Genre: Avant-garde rock, experimental music, chamber music
- Length: 43:22
- Label: Hydra Head Records

Kayo Dot chronology
Dowsing Anemone with Copper Tongue (2006)	Blue Lambency Downward (2008)	Coyote (2010)

Blue Lambency Downward is the third studio album by American avant-garde metal band Kayo Dot, released on Hydra Head Records in May 2008. After much of the group left to pursue outside projects, the only members who remained were frontman Toby Driver and violinist and long-time collaborator Mia Matsumiya. The two began recording the album in early 2007 using a revolving door of contributing musicians. The album is heavily influenced by chamber and orchestral music, and features an abundance of woodwinds. It is widely considered to be Kayo Dot's least heavy album to date.

The ensuing tour featured a mostly new group of musicians: Patrick Wolff on woodwinds, Daniel Means on woodwinds and guitar, David Bodie on drums, and Terran Olson on woodwinds and keyboards. Much of the lineup would stay the same for the recording of their next album, Coyote.

== Reception ==
Professional ratings
Review scores
Source	Rating
AllMusic	4/5 stars
Drowned in Sound	7/10 stars
Lambgoat	6/10
Pitchfork	3.3/10

The album received mixed reviews. Pitchfork Media criticized it for a lack of memorability, giving it a 3.3 out of 10, while AllMusic was more favorable, giving the album 4 out of 5 stars. Drowned in Sound gave the album a 7 out of 10 stars.

== Track listing ==
All songs and lyrics written by Toby Driver.

No.	Title	Length
1.	"Blue Lambency Downward"	10:00
2.	"Clelia Walking"	5:29
3.	"Right Hand Is the One I Want"	6:54
4.	"The Sow Submits"	4:02
5.	"The Awkward Wind Wheel"	3:30
6.	"The Useless Ladder"	2:40
7.	"Symmetrical Arizona"	10:50
Total length:		43:22

== Personnel ==
Kayo Dot

- Toby Driver – acoustic, electric, 12-string, baritone, and bass guitars; piano; organ; synthesizer; laptop Mellotron; Malletophone and gongs; soprano clarinet; voice
- Mia Matsumiya – violin, voice, organ, and knobs

Additional musicians

- Charlie Zeleny – drums
- Hans Teuber – soprano and bass clarinets, alto sax, flute
- Skerik – tenor and baritone sax, vibraphone
- Dave Abramson – Malletphone and gongs, and additional percussion
- B.R.A.D. (Brad Mowen) – low vocals on "Clelia Walking"
- Randall Dunn – sound effects and synth design
