= Coffins on Io =

Studio album by Kayo Dot
- Released: August 14, 2014
- Genre: Electronic, dark wave, gothic rock
- Length: 49:39
- Label: The Flenser
- Producer: Toby Driver

Kayo Dot chronology
Hubardo (2013)	Coffins on Io (2014)	Plastic House on Base of Sky (2016)

Professional ratings
Review scores
Source	Rating
Empty Lighthouse	Positive
Re-views Media	4/5 stars

Coffins on Io is the seventh studio album by American avant-garde metal band Kayo Dot, released in the UK on August 14, 2014 and in the US on October 13 through experimental metal label The Flenser. It is a follow-up to 2013's Hubardo. It's the first album from Kayo Dot to not be self-released since 2012's Gamma Knife. Coffins on Io marks a notable change in sound. It combines influences of Type O Negative, The Sisters of Mercy, Peter Gabriel, dark wave and other 80s electronic musicians. It combines aspects of electronic music, post-punk, gothic rock and new wave. It was produced by Toby Driver.

== Writing and recording ==
After releasing an album on The Flenser for one of Driver's other bands, Vaura, Driver gave the label four songs that he had considered releasing under a different band moniker. After the label's reception to the tracks, he decided to release it under the Kayo Dot moniker, the label signing the band to a contract then, the band's first music to be released by a label since 2010. The album began as a four-song experiment, and was transformed into a full-length album. Continuing the theme of the last album, the album was recorded by the full live band.

== Music and lyrics ==
Driver has said that the album was influenced by dark wave as well as Type O Negative, Peter Gabriel and other similar electronic bands of the 1980s. Driver said in an interview that the album was heavily influenced by dark wave and was written as evoking "1980s retrofuture noir."

Driver's insistence that the album stay away from the influence of Hubardo resulted in an album that sounds drastically different from prior Kayo Dot albums. There are no growled vocals, and the album is not metal like many of the prior albums. In addition, this album relies heavily on repetition and melody, something prior Kayo Dot albums have strayed away from. Driver said in an interview that film heavily influenced the direction of the album, specifically Blade Runner.

== Release and reception ==
The album was released on October 15 through The Flenser. It is available for purchase on The Flenser's site and Kayo Dot's bandcamp in MP3, FLAC, CD and LP. The album has received positive reviews, many praising the band's shift in music direction. Empty Lighthouse called it "Kayo Dot's best album to date" and celebrates its ability to "nail the noir feel," describing the album as "Lynchian". Re-views Media writer Michael Snoxall gave the album four stars out of five, saying the album feels familiar yet alien at the same time, and that the album is a "monumental" and "towering achievement." SputnikMusic gave it a 4/5, saying it "hums with sleek resonance" and calling the album "vibrant and exciting."

== Track listing ==
Music by Toby Driver. Lyrics by Jason Byron.

No.	Title	Length
1.	"The Mortality of Doves"	11:53
2.	"Offramp Cycle, Pattern 22"	9:24
3.	"Longtime Disturbance on the Miracle Mile"	4:07
4.	"Library Subterranean"	8:23
5.	"The Assassination of Adam"	5:47
6.	"Spirit Photography"	10:05

== Credits ==
- Toby Driver – voice, bass, synths, electric percussion, guitars
- Daniel Means – alto sax, tenor sax, synths, electric percussion
- Kim Abrams – drums, electric percussion
- Tim Byrnes –organ solo on track 1, rhodes on track 6
