= Gregor Samsa (band) =

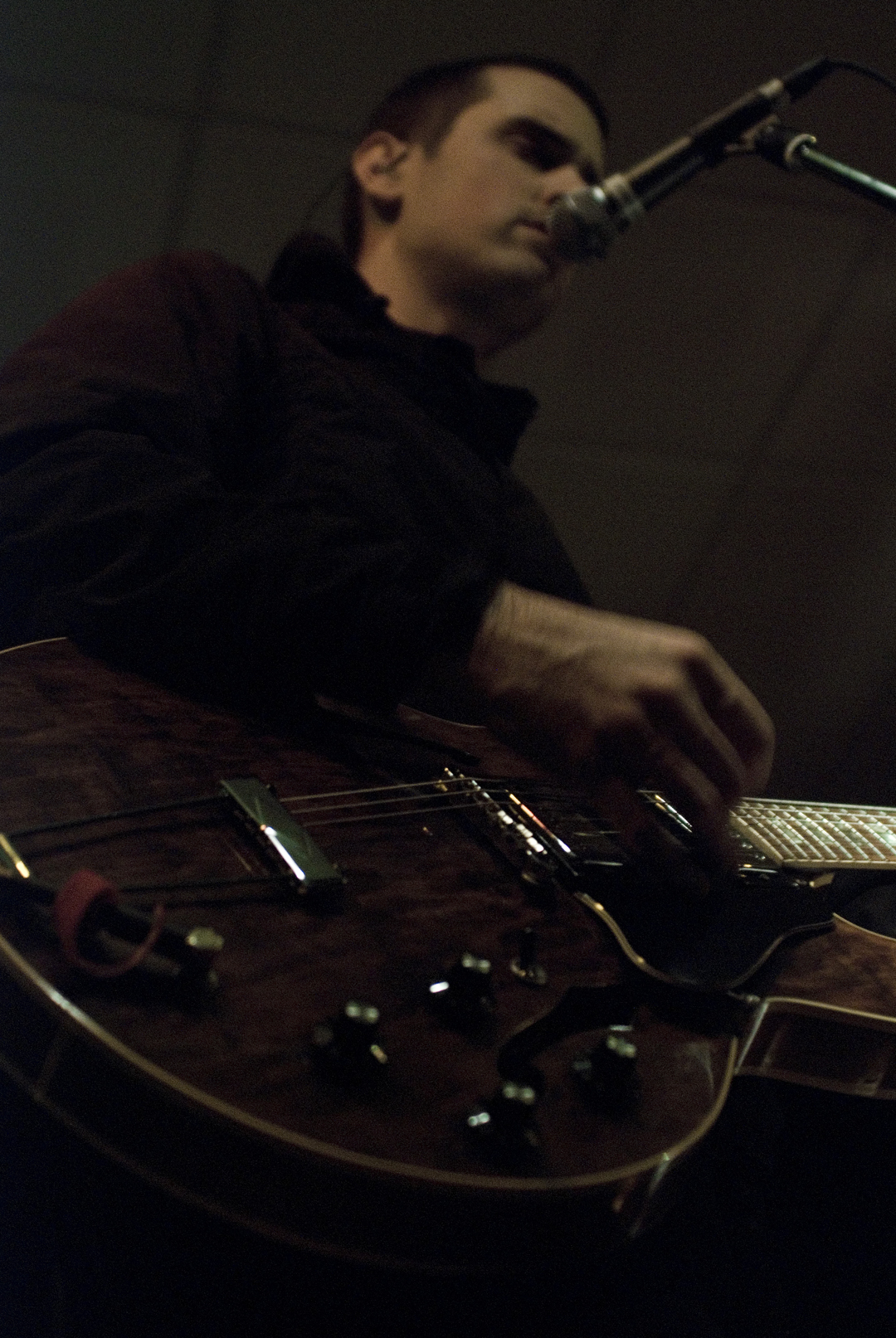

Background information
- Origin: Richmond, Virginia, United States
- Genres: Post-rock, shoegaze
- Years active: 2000–present
- Labels: Iodine Recordings (Past); The Kora Records (United States); Own Records (Europe)

Gregor Samsa is an American band from Virginia, United States, formed in 2000 and fronted by Champ Bennett. It takes its name from the main character of Franz Kafka's novella The Metamorphosis.

The band's sound, although rooted in the post-rock genre, differs from that of other bands in the genre in that it employs dual vocals by Bennett and Nikki King, a feature which relates them to the shoegazing and slowcore genres. Gregor Samsa has stated on its website that "the early history of the group has been lost in a wash of noise, strange beeps, and outright lies”.

The band released their debut EP Gregor Samsa in 2002 and followed it with their second EP 27:36 in 2003. In 2006 they released their debut album 55:12, reviews of which compared it to the work of acts such as Brian Eno, Múm, Sigur Rós, Godspeed You! Black Emperor, and Low.

In support of its latest release, the band played twenty-one eastern US venues in March before then venturing a 23-date tour of the United Kingdom, France, Luxembourg, and Germany during April. Historically, the band has chosen to tour and perform alongside a wide array bands and genres including Kayo Dot, Barzin, Part Chimp, Calla, Engine Down, Isis, Pelican, Explosions in the Sky, Interpol, and many others.

The band completed their sophomore album, Rest, in late 2007 and released it in April 2008. In December 2024 their first two official EPs were released as a compilation called 40:13.5.

== Current members ==
- Champ Bennett - guitar, vocals, piano
- Billy Bennett - drums, video, samples
- Nikki King - Rhodes piano, keyboard, vocals
- Jeremiah Klinger - guitar, baritone guitar, clarinet, theremin
- Cory Bise - bass guitar
- Bobby Donne - Synth
- Mike Ashley - drums
- Mia Matsumiya - violin

== Past members and contributors ==
- Brandon Evans - guitar, keyboard, lap steel guitar
- Jason LaFerrera - bass guitar
- Earl Yevak - drums
- Bobby Donne - bass guitar
- Rick Alverson - guitar
- Jason Wood - bass guitar
- Eric Yevak - guitar
- Amber Blankenship - cello, violin
- Jon Sullivan - double bass
- Nick Wurz - bass guitar (sometimes played with a bow)
- Nathan Altice - guitar, keyboard
- Tony Thaxton - drums
- Toby Driver - clarinet and vibraphone

== Discography ==
=== Studio albums ===
- 55:12 (CD LP 2006)
- Rest (CD LP 2008)

=== EPs ===
- Gregor Samsa (CD EP 2002)
- 27:36 (CD EP 2003)

=== Live albums ===
- Over Air (CD LP 2009)

=== Compilations ===
- 40:13.5 (LP 2024)

=== Splits ===
- Gregor Samsa / The Silent Type (CD EP, 2001)
- Gregor Samsa / Red Sparowes (CD EP, 2005)
