= Hubardo =

Studio album by Kayo Dot
- Released: August 31, 2013
- Recorded: April 2013 at Avast Studios, Seattle
- Genre: Avant-garde metal, black metal, experimental rock
- Length: 98:50
- Label: Ice Level Music
- Producer: Toby Driver, Randall Dunn

Kayo Dot chronology
Gamma Knife (2012)	Hubardo (2013)	Coffins on Io (2014)

Professional ratings
Review scores
Source	Rating
Bearded Gentlemen	5/5 stars
ContactMusic	9/10 stars

Hubardo is the sixth studio album by American avant-garde metal band Kayo Dot. It is a concept double album self-released and funded through pre-orders on frontman Toby Driver's Ice Level Music in 2013. It is the follow-up to Gamma Knife, which was released in 2012. It is Kayo Dot's longest album and its first double album, and contains aspects of black metal, post-rock and chamber music. It was picked as the 4th best album of 2013 on indie music website SputnikMusic.

Hubardo was co-produced by Driver and longtime producer Randall Dunn. Occasional collaborator and former maudlin of the Well vocalist Jason Byron recorded his first vocal performance since 2001's maudlin of the Well album Leaving Your Body Map on the song "The Black Stone". He also wrote the lyrics for the album and a 40-page book, entitled "The Sword of Satan", packed with the vinyl copy of the album detailing the story behind Hubardo.

After leaving Hydra Head Records and releasing Gamma Knife independently, Driver crowdfunded the album entirely through pre-orders on independent music website Bandcamp. Shortly after the release of the album, Driver announced that he was in the process of producing a triple LP "super limited black vinyl" that was limited to 200 pressings which contained a 40-page book detailing the concept behind the album entitled "The Sword of Satan" written by Jason Byron.

== Writing and recording ==
After leaving Hydra Head, Driver felt that "labels were not interested in what I was doing". He said that the return to the more metal-based sound of early Kayo Dot albums was sparked prior to the making of Gamma Knife because he felt frustrated with "bland, unthoughtful, weak metal coming out and receiving acclaim." The budgets for Stained Glass and Gamma Knife were minuscule, thus limiting the scope in which those projects could be conceived; however, with Hubardo, the group had a set budget that was considerably larger, allowing the band to create an album on a grander scale. Additionally, Driver was able to dedicate his time to writing the album due to a lack of day job. Due to increased repetition and an aspect of catchiness, they characterized the album as "pop".

The album was recorded at Randall Dunn's studio in Seattle, Washington after receiving a sizeable amount of funding from their crowdfunding attempt via the group's Bandcamp page. This reportedly allowed the group much more flexibility to undertake such a large project.

Unlike past albums, the entire live band performed on the record. Driver plays the bass guitar on the album, as well as synthesizers, piano, and organ. Shortly after the release of the album, longtime collaborator Mia Matsumiya and Terran Olson moved and are no longer a part of the band's live incarnation. No word has been given if they will return to future Kayo Dot releases.

== Music and lyrics ==
Driver continued to collaborate on the lyrics with Jason Byron on the album, the lyrics and concept a collaboration between the two. The lyrics reportedly came first, and the composition of the album was much more in line with how maudlin of the Well songs were composed. He decided to make the album without worrying whether the music would be perceived as "avant-garde". The album, marking the tenth anniversary of the band's formation, draws inspiration from aspects of all of Kayo Dot's various sounds over the past decade, as well as from predecessor group maudlin of the Well. "Hubardo" means "lantern" or "lamp" in the mystical language of Enochian.

The album, more metallic in style while still maintaining the wide orchestration Kayo Dot is known for, grew out of a dislike of critically respected metal, according to Toby Driver. The album features a very wide list of collaborators, unlike recent albums which were mostly written and performed by Driver and a few people.

== Release and reception ==
=== Release ===
Despite attempting to use Kickstarter, the group was left with low finances after leaving Hydra Head, and Driver considered ending the project. In early 2013, however, Kayo Dot offered preorders on a new album to finance the album's recording and publishing; the effort was successful, giving the band the ability to go into the studio with a set budget. Those who pre-ordered received the album digitally on August 31, 2013. Shortly after the initial digital release, the group announced that they would be releasing a limited 3-LP set with artwork by Rachel Wolf and the book "The Sword of Satan" by Jason Byron. The 200 vinyl run sold out immediately.

=== Reception ===
Hubardo was released to positive reception. Sputnikmusic ranked the album as the 4th of 2013, saying it recalled the "black metal chamber music of Choirs of the Eye" and that it is "simultaneously focused and sprawling. ContactMusic gave it a 9/10, calling it the most "enjoyable metal album of the year." Bearded Gentlemen gave the album a perfect 5/5, saying that "[t]he addition of actual memorable musical segments makes the band finally feel complete." By-Volume gave it a 9.5/10, calling it a "rare and engrossing experience."

== Track listing ==
All songs written by Toby Driver. All lyrics written by Jason Byron.

Disc 1
No.	Title	Length
1.	"The Black Stone"	10:38
2.	"Crown-in-the-Muck"	8:54
3.	"Thief"	6:51
4.	"Vision Adjustment to Another Wavelength"	4:53
5.	"Zlida Caosgi (To Water the Earth)"	5:25
6.	"The First Matter (Saturn in the Guise of Sadness)"	9:28
Total length:		46:09

Disc 2
No.	Title	Length
7.	"The Second Operation (Lunar Water)"	13:18
8.	"Floodgate"	7:22
9.	"And He Built Him a Boat"	7:27
10.	"Passing the River"	10:12
11.	"The Wait of the World"	14:22
Total length:		52:41

== Credits ==
- Toby Driver – vocals, bass, synthesizer, piano, organ, percussion
- Daniel Means – alto sax, tenor sax, clarinet
- Kim Abrams – drums
- Terran Olson – flute, alto sax, clarinet, piano, organ, synthesizer
- Tim Byrnes – trumpet, horn in F
- Mia Matsumiya – violin
- Jason Byron – vocals on "The Black Stone"
- Jessika Kenney & BC Campbell – guest backing vocals
- Randall Dunn – synth design
