= Secret Curve =

2011 album by PAK

Studio album by PAK
- Released: February 2011
- Genre: Progressive rock
- Label: Tzadik

Secret Curve is a 2011 album by Ron Anderson's PAK. It was released on John Zorn's Tzadik label as part of the composer series.

== Track listing ==
1. "Overture"
2. "Let Me Tell You Something"
3. "Caffeine Static Rendezvous"
4. "No Future"
5. "Caro-Kann"
6. "Secret Curve"
7. "Mama’s Little Anarchist"
8. "E4 or D4?"
9. "Trebuchet"
10. "Blinding Light"
11. "Kempelen's Automaton"

== Personnel ==
- Ron Anderson: Bass Guitar
- Kim Abrams: Drums, Percussion
- Tim Byrnes: Trumpet, French Horn, Keyboards
- Anthony Coleman: Piano
- Jérôme Noetinger: Electronics, Tape Manipulation
- Eve Risser: Piano, Prepared Piano
- Tom Swafford: Violin
- Stefan Zeniuk: Clarinet, Bass Clarinet, Tenor Saxophone, Bass Saxophone, English Horn

== The Ashfield Sessions ==
Anderson released an earlier version of the compositions on Secret Curve as a limited edition live CDR called The Ashfield Sessions in 2008. 150 hand numbered copies were made.
