= Gato Loco =

American band

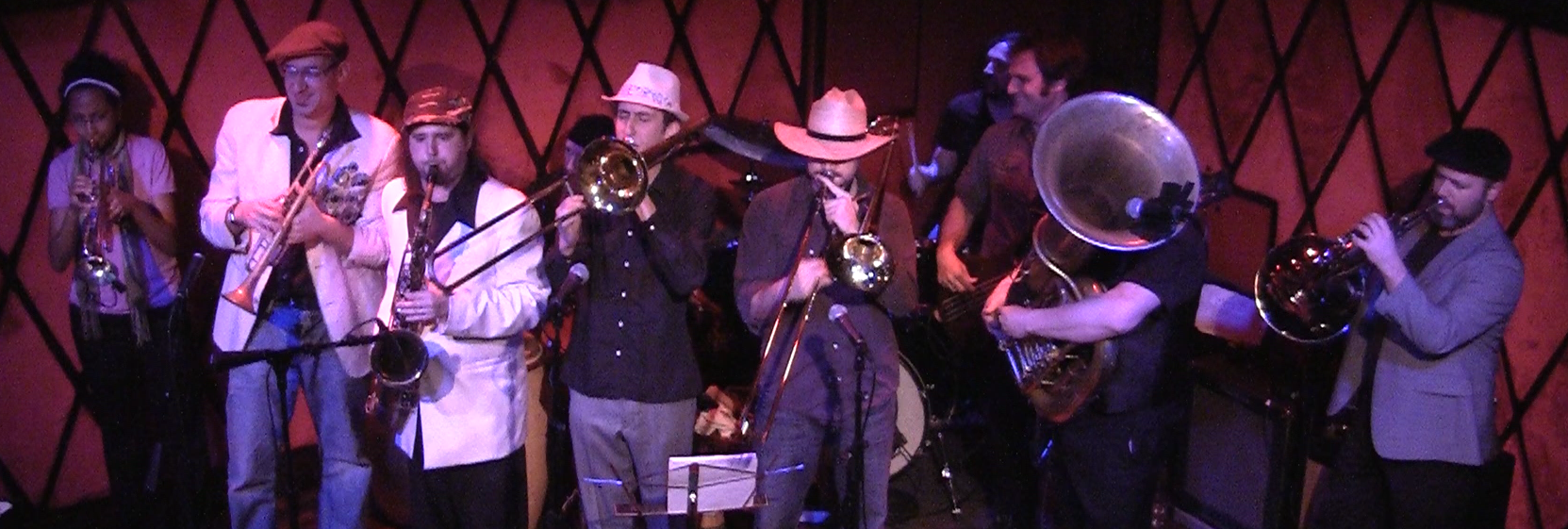

Gato Loco is a New York City based band formed in 2006 by Stefan Zeniuk & formerly produced/conducted by Clifton Hyde. Gato Loco CocoNino has been positively reviewed by the press. The band was interviewed in 2011 by Radio France while on their European tour.

== Current personnel ==
- Stefan Zeniuk: tenor/bass saxophones, bass clarinet
- Tim Vaughn: trombone
- "Tuba" Joe Exley: tuba
- Ari Folman-Cohen: bass
