= Jesse Krakow =

American musician (born 1977)

- Born: April 12, 1977 (age 49)
- Origin: New York City, New York, U.S.
- Genres: Indie rock · alternative rock · avant-garde rock · punk rock
- Instrument: Bass guitar

Jesse Krakow (born April 12, 1977) is an American musician, bassist, producer, and composer based in New York City.

== Career ==
Krakow has toured with Shudder to Think, playing bass on their 2009 live album Live From Home. He collaborated with Tatsuya Yoshida and Ron Anderson for live performances as RonRuins, was previously in Anderson's band PAK, and is featured on their Motel CD. Currently he works with Dot Wiggin of The Shaggs in The Dot Wiggin Band, instrumental-metal quartet Haessliche Luftmasken, country-soul band The Tall Pines, prog-rock octet Doctor Nerve, six-piece big band Fast 'n Bulbous: The Captain Beefheart Project featuring Beefheart alumni Gary Lucas, avant-afro beat collective Stick Against Stone Orchestra, lo-fi recording project We Are The Musk Brigade, all-ages experimental group The Exploding Note Ensemble, 80's hair metal tribute HAIR AMERICA, and MANDONNA, an all-male tribute to Madonna.

From June 2012 to December 2013, he was the host of "Minor Music", a radio show on WFMU that spotlighted musicians under 18. He is also on the teaching staff at Bootsy Collins' online music school Funk University. In May 2013, The Brooklyn Philharmonic premiered his piece for string quartet, female vocals, drumset, and fuzz bass called "Bad Doggie".

He was a longtime member of avant rock band Time of Orchids, which released six albums, collaborated with pianist Marilyn Crispell, Kate Pierson (The B-52's), Julee Cruise ("Twin Peaks"), trumpeter Tim Byrnes, and was signed to a number significant labels (one of which was John Zorn's Tzadik label). He has two solo albums out of Nebraska's Public Eyesore/Eh? record label - 2004's Oceans in the Sun + 2008's World Without Nachos. He latest album A Loaf Of Fun will be released in 2014 on the Ohio-based label Factotum Tapes.

He has worked with Nona Hendryx (LaBelle/Talking Heads), Nina Persson (The Cardigans/A Camp), R Stevie Moore, Eric Slick (Dr. Dog), Julie Slick (Adrian Belew Power Trio), Irwin Chusid (WFMU), Chris Butler (The Waitresses), Cynthia Sley (Bush Tetras), Doug Gillard (Guided By Voices), Pat Irwin (The B-52's/The Raybeats), The Losers Lounge, Mike Pride, Jac Berrocall, Mike Fornatale (The Left Banke/The Monks), Pat Irwin (The B-52's), George Korein (Infidel!/Castro), Elliott Sharp, Weasel Walter (The Flying Luttenbachers), Colin Marston (Gorguts/Behold...The Arctopus), Scott Bruzenak, Keaton Simons, Anne Gomez (Cantwell Gomez + Jordan, Religious To Damn, Dylan Sparrow (Giggle The Ozone), and Lori.

In 2012, he put together a tribute to The Shaggs, which resulted in forming The Dot Wiggin Band with Dot Wiggin of the Shaggs, which released their debut album, Ready! Get! Go! in 2013 on Jello Biafra's Alternative Tentacles label.
