= 27:36 =

EP by Gregor Samsa
- Released: 2003
- Genre: Post-rock
- Length: 27:36
- Label: Iodine (United States)
- Producer: Gregor Samsa

Gregor Samsa chronology
Gregor Samsa (2002)	27:36 (2003)	55:12 (2006)

27:36 is the second EP released by Gregor Samsa in 2003, one year after their debut EP, Gregor Samsa. It features three untitled tracks which were later named by the band for easy reference, though those names are unofficial.

== Track listing ==
No.	Title	Length
1.	Untitled	6:52
2.	Untitled	9:02
3.	Untitled	11:42

== Gregor Samsa ==
- Champ Bennett – guitar, vocals
- Nikki King – Rhodes piano, keyboard, vocals
- Nick Wurz – bass guitar
- Nathan Altice – guitar, keyboard
- Earl Yevak – drums
