= Coyote (Kayo Dot album) =

Studio album by Kayo Dot
- Released: April 20, 2010
- Recorded: 2009
- Genres: Avant-rock; post-rock; gothic rock
- Length: 39:48
- Label: Hydra Head Records
- Producer: Randall Dunn

Kayo Dot chronology
Blue Lambency Downward (2008)	Coyote (2010)	Gamma Knife (2012)

Professional ratings
Review scores
Source	Rating
AllMusic	3.5/5 stars
PopMatters	5/10 stars

Coyote is the fourth studio album by American avant-garde metal band Kayo Dot, released April 20, 2010 on Hydra Head Records. The album is a single narrative-driven, long-form composition in five movements. The story and text were provided by a close, terminally-ill friend of the band, Yuko Sueta, in the final stage of her life. The music was written by Toby Driver in a so-called "goth fusion" style, combining influences from the Cure, Bauhaus and Faith and the Muse with further influences from Scott Walker's experimental album The Drift. Sueta's story and lyrics were constructed with deliberate melodrama as part of the intended gothic aesthetic, expressing the protagonist's loneliness and longing to be in a better place, and her journey through her own personal looking-glass through a hallucinatory world of fear and wonder.

Like Kayo Dot's previous album, Coyote was produced and engineered by Randall Dunn in Seattle, Washington.

== Story ==
In April 2008, Toby Driver began working on a new long-form composition with Yuko Sueta, a NYC-based writer, filmmaker, and video artist. A first draft of the piece was premiered at The Stone in September 2008 by "The Kayo Dot Auxiliary Unit" (David Bodie and Daniel Means of Kayo Dot, Yuko Sueta, and Tim Byrnes on trumpet). Shortly thereafter, Sueta, who had been fighting breast cancer, became incapacitated by the disease. Driver then re-drafted and adapted the piece for Kayo Dot toured it in May 2009 on the road with Secret Chiefs 3, and recorded it with Randall Dunn in Seattle during June–July 2009, releasing it later as 2010's Coyote. Sueta died while the record was in post-production, and the band dedicated it to her. After the positive reaction to the content performed on tour, Driver released Coyote in April 2010 on Hydra Head. On the album, the rotating lineup was made up of Driver on bass and vocals, Terran Olson on keyboards, David Bodie on drums, Mia Matsumiya on violin, Tim Byrnes on trumpet, and Daniel Means on woodwinds. Coyote was released to mixed reviews on the sound, but positive reception on the concept of the album, such as PopMatters, who called it "stark and inaccessible."

== Track listing ==
All music written by Toby Driver and Kayo Dot. All lyrics written by Yuko Sueta.

No.	Title	Length
1.	"Calonyction Girl"	7:59
2.	"Whisper Ineffable"	11:13
3.	"Abyss Hinge 1: Sleeping Birds Sighing in Roscolux"	3:45
4.	"Abyss Hinge 2: The Shrinking Armature"	13:40
5.	"Cartogram Out of Phase"	3:11
Total length:		39:48

== Personnel ==
Kayo Dot

- Toby Driver – bass guitar, vocals
- Mia Matsumiya – violin, electric violin, guitar
- David Bodie – drums, gong, other percussion
- Daniel Means – alto saxophone
- Terran Olson – synthesizers, keyboards, organ, piano, tenor saxophone
- Tim Byrnes – trumpet, French horn

Production

- Randall Dunn – producer, recording engineer, mixing
- Toby Driver – producer, recording, engineer, artwork
- Mell Dettmer – mastering
- Gemma Fleming – band photography
- James O'Meara – layout and construction
