= Blasphemy (Kayo Dot album) =

Studio album by Kayo Dot
- Released: September 6, 2019
- Genre: Avant-rock; post-rock; gothic rock; progressive rock
- Length: 43:05
- Label: Prophecy Productions
- Producer: Toby Driver; Randall Dunn

Kayo Dot chronology
Plastic House on Base of Sky (2016)	Blasphemy (2019)	Moss Grew on the Swords and Plowshares Alike (2021)

Blasphemy is the ninth studio album by American avant-garde metal band Kayo Dot. It was released on September 6, 2019 via Prophecy Productions.

== Critical reception ==
Professional ratings
Review scores
Source	Rating
Metal Injection	9/10
Sputnikmusic	3/5

Treblezine gave Blasphemy a positive review, calling it "one of the best pieces of avant-garde music in recent memory" while dubbing it "a challenging listen" with "the backbones of songs largely buried, unearthing themselves only after several listens". Sputnikmusic awarded the album a score of 3/5, noting its "wonky and unique progressive rock style" and praising Driver's "highly impressive and versatile singing performance".

== Track listing ==
All lyrics are written by Jason Byron; all music is composed by Toby Driver.

No.	Title	Length
1.	"Ocean Cumulonimbus"	3:59
2.	"The Something Opal"	5:43
3.	"Lost Souls on Lonesome's Way"	5:20
4.	"Vanishing Act in Blinding Gray"	8:07
5.	"Turbine, Hook, and Haul"	6:09
6.	"Midnight Mystic Rise and Fall"	5:33
7.	"An Eye for a Lie"	5:21
8.	"Blasphemy: A Prophecy"	4:13

== Personnel ==
- Toby Driver – vocals, guitar, bass guitar, piano, rhodes, organ, synths, editing, programming and percussion
- Ron Varod - guitar, solo guitar on "Lost Souls on Lonesome's Way"
- Leonardo Didkovsky – drums
- Philip Price – drums
- Tim Byrnes – Special guest trumpet on "Turbine, Hook, and Haul"
- Timm Mason – additional synth design
