= Motel (Pak album) =

Motel is a 2005 album by New York City brutal prog band Pak. It has been well received in the indie marketplace it was targeted for.

== Track listing ==
- 1 "You Like It Like That" (5:10)
- 2 "Heatwave" (3:21)
- 3 "100% Human Hair" (1:39)
- 4 "Jam Jel Treatment" (3:36)
- 5 "The Higher The Elevation The Lesser The Vegetation" (4:49)
- 6 "Every Body Likes You" (9:52)
- 7 "Zugzwang" (4:00)
- 8 "Bienvenue A L´Hotel Plastique" (9:51)

== Performers ==
- Ron Anderson (guitar, piano, vocals)
- Jesse Krakow (Fast 'n' Bulbous) on bass
- Kim Abrams drummer
- Carla Kihlstedt-violin (Sleepytime Gorilla Museum)
- Ross Bonadonna-sax, Tim Byrnes-trumpet
- Stephen Gauci-sax.
