= 55:12 =

Studio album by Gregor Samsa
- Released: March 7, 2006
- Studio: The Recorditorium (Richmond, Virginia)
- Genre: Post-rock; slowcore
- Length: 50:35
- Label: The Kora (US); Own (Europe)
- Producer: Gregor Samsa

Gregor Samsa chronology
27:36 (2003)	55:12 (2006)	Rest (2008)

Professional ratings
Review scores
Source	Rating
AllMusic	3.5/5 stars
Pitchfork Media	7.8/10
PopMatters	6/10

55:12 is the first full-length studio album by Virginia-based post-rock band Gregor Samsa, released in 2006 on The Kora Records.

The album was tracked at the Recorditorium in Richmond, Virginia, engineered by Jason Laferrera and produced by Gregor Samsa. The mix was done by Brian Paulson (Slint, Wilco, Beck).

== Track listing ==
No.	Title	Length
1.	"Makeshift Shelters"	4:52
2.	"Even Numbers"	10:05
3.	"What I Can Manage"	7:11
4.	"Loud and Clear"	2:51
5.	"These Points Balance"	7:41
6.	"Young and Old"	7:33
7.	"We'll Lean That Way Forever"	3:41
8.	"Lessening"	6:36

== Gregor Samsa ==
- Champ Bennett – guitar, vocals, keyboards
- Nikki King – Rhodes piano, keyboards, vocals
- Jason LaFerrera – bass, keyboards
- Billy Bennett – drums, vibraphone, percussion
