= Dowsing Anemone with Copper Tongue =

Studio album by Kayo Dot
- Released: January 10, 2006
- Recorded: August 2005
- Genre: Experimental music; post-rock; avant-garde metal; chamber music
- Length: 60:19
- Label: Robotic Empire
- Producer: Toby Driver

Kayo Dot chronology
Choirs of the Eye (2003)	Dowsing Anemone with Copper Tongue (2006)	Blue Lambency Downward (2008)

Professional ratings
Review scores
Source	Rating
Lambgoat	9/10 stars
Pitchfork Media	(7.7/10)
Sputnikmusic	(4.5/5)

Dowsing Anemone with Copper Tongue is the second studio album by American avant-garde metal band Kayo Dot, released on Robotic Empire in 2006. The album received high praise from Pitchfork, Lambgoat, and Sputnikmusic, the last of whom named it the #2 album of 2006.

Shortly before the recording of the album, longtime collaborator and former maudlin of the Well member Sam Gutterman left to pursue outside projects, and was replaced by Tom Malone. It was the group's first and only release on the Robotic Empire label. The group embarked on a lengthy and highly successful tour after the album's release, which would be the last tour in which the band was mostly made up of former motW members, as Greg Massi left shortly after the tour to pursue solo projects, eventually forming the band Baliset. Ryan McGuire and Forbes Graham also left after the tour.

== Track listing ==
All music written by Toby Driver. All lyrics written by Jason Byron except "Immortelle and Paper Caravelle" by Toby Driver.

No.	Title	Length
1.	"Gemini Becoming the Tripod"	10:43
2.	"Immortelle and Paper Caravelle"	9:42
3.	"Aura on an Asylum Wall"	7:44
4.	"___ On Limpid Form"	18:00
5.	"Amaranth the Peddler"	14:07
Total length:		60:19

== Credits ==
Kayo Dot

- Toby Driver – guitar, piano, clarinet, percussion, voice
- Greg Massi – guitar, voice
- Mia Matsumiya – violin, percussion
- Forbes Graham – trumpet, euphonium, percussion, voice
- Ryan McGuire – bass, voice
- John Carchia – guitar, voice
- Tom Malone – drums, percussion

Additional musician

- Kyouhei Sada – guitar, keyboards, sound effects, voice

Production

- Toby Driver – producer, cover artwork
- Jim Fogarty – recording engineer, mixing
- Chris Fortin – assistant engineer, mixing assistant
- Alan Douches – mastering
- Dan Olivencia – inside artwork
- Paul Jeffrey – layout
