= Time of Orchids =

American experimental rock band

- Origin: New York City, United States
- Genres: Experimental, avant-metal, avant-jazz, post-hardcore, noise rock
- Years active: 1999–2007
- Past members: Chuck Stern; Eric Fitzgerald; Jesse Krakow; David Bodie; Kim Abrams; Charlie Looker; Will Redmond
- Website: Bandcamp

Time of Orchids was an American experimental rock band based in New York City. Founded in 1999 and disbanded in 2007, Time of Orchids was led by frontman and composer Chuck Stern.

== History ==
Time of Orchids' 2001 debut, Melonwhisper, included Chuck Stern on vocals and synths, Charlie Looker and Will Redmond on guitar and vocals, bassist Jesse Krakow, and drummer Kim Abrams, with a guest performance from jazz pianist Marilyn Crispell.

For the band's second and third albums, Much Too Much Fun (2003) and Early As Seen in Pace (Epicene, 2004), Stern played with Krakow, Abrams, and guitarist-vocalist Eric Fitzgerald; the earlier release featured guest vocals from Kate Pierson of The B-52's.

The lineup for Time of Orchids' remaining full-length releases was Stern, Krakow, Fitzgerald, and drummer David Bodie. On Sarcast While, released on John Zorn's Tzadik Records in 2005, the quartet was joined by guest performances from Tim Byrnes, Maryanna Hansen, and Julee Cruise (of Twin Peaks). In 2007, the band's final full release, Namesake Caution, came out on Cuneiform Records.

In 2010, Stern self-released In Due Time, a collection of previously-unheard Time of Orchids' tracks and remixes; the credited performers are Stern, Krakow, Abrams, Fitzgerald, Bodie, and Looker.

== Discography ==
- Melonwhisper (Relapse / Aquarius, 2001)
- Much Too Much Fun (2003)
- Early As Seen In Pace (Epicene Sound Systems, 2004)
- Sarcast While (Tzadik, 2005)
- Namesake Caution (Cuneiform, 2007)
- In Due Time (2010)
