= Choirs of the Eye =

Studio album by Kayo Dot
- Released: October 21, 2003
- Recorded: April 2002 – June 2003 at Zing Recording Studio in Westfield, Massachusetts, United States
- Genre: Avant-garde metal; post-metal; chamber rock; black metal
- Length: 55:59
- Label: Tzadik Records
- Producer: Toby Driver, John Zorn, Kazunori Sugiyama

Kayo Dot chronology
| Choirs of the Eye (2003) | Dowsing Anemone with Copper Tongue (2006) |

Professional ratings
Review scores
| Source | Rating |
|---|---|
| AllMusic | 4/5 stars |

Choirs of the Eye is the debut studio album by American avant-garde metal band Kayo Dot, released on Tzadik Records in 2003. It was released shortly after the breakup of maudlin of the Well, with the band consisting of several members from the former band as well as guest performers who are friends of band members. The album is titled after a lyric from the maudlin of the Well song "Blight of River-Systems", on My Fruit Psychobells...A Seed Combustible. SputnikMusic voted it as one of the best metal albums of the 2000s. The group performed the entire album in 2010 to two sold out nights in Brooklyn, New York.

== Style ==
Choirs of the Eye blends aspects of experimental metal, post-rock, art rock, jazz, and modern composition, with long, predominantly instrumental, through-composed songs. Additionally, the album continues maudlin of the Well's unorthodox fusion of common metal and rock instrumentation with woodwinds, brass, and strings, with the intention of helping the electric guitar, drum kit, and electric bass to become part of the lexicon of modern classical music. These features helped entice John Zorn to sign the band and distribute the album on his Tzadik label as the first full band in its 'Composer Series'.

== Lyrics ==
The lyrics were written by Jason Byron, longtime collaborator of band leader and main composer Toby Driver, who also wrote for maudlin of the Well. Byron would listen to the instrumental compositions and match lyrics accordingly, which were usually written previously and independently. In some cases, entire stanzas were unable to fit in the song structures, which led to some instances of alternative sound creation and recording methods; the song "The Antique," for example, features a sound recording of an antique Polaroid camera as it snaps a photo of an unused lyric stanza, thereby making the camera 'speak' the unused words. The lyrics are not published in the album's liner notes.

== Track listing ==
All lyrics are written by Jason Byron; all music is composed by Toby Driver.

| No. | Title | Length |
|---|---|---|
| 1. | "Marathon" | 10:14 |
| 2. | "A Pitcher of Summer" | 5:46 |
| 3. | "The Manifold Curiosity" | 14:28 |
| 4. | "Wayfarer" | 10:45 |
| 5. | "The Antique" | 14:41 |

== Credits ==
Kayo Dot

- Toby Driver – guitar, vocals; electronics (1, 3), bells (3, 4), cello (4), double bass (5)
- Greg Massi – guitar; vocals (1)
- Nicholas Kyte – bass guitar; vocals (1, 3)
- Sam Gutterman – drums; vocals (1, 3, 5)
- Terran Olson – Hammond M-3 (1, 3–5), Rhodes electric piano (1, 4), flute (1), piano (2, 5), clarinet (3), alto saxophone (3, 4, 5)
- Mia Matsumiya – violin (3–5), viola (3, 4)

Additional musicians

- Sam Minnich – French horn (1, 2)
- Benjie Messer – trombone (1, 2)
- Todd Neece – recitation (1)
- Alex Nagle – guitar (3)
- Adam Scott – trumpet (5)
- Jason Bitner – camera (5)

Production

- Toby Driver – producer, cover artwork
- John Zorn – executive producer
- Kazunori Sugiyama – associate producer
- Jim Fogarty – engineering, mixing
- Scott Hull – mastering
- Trevor Brown – back cover artwork
- Heung-Heung Chin – design
