= Stick Against Stone =

- Also known as: SAS, Pancreatic Ballet, Stick Against Stone Orchestra
- Origin: Pittsburgh, Pennsylvania, United States
- Genres: Post-punk, no wave, dub, funk, free jazz, Art punk, worldbeat
- Years active: 1981–1990 - 2011-
- Labels: MediaGroove, T.M.I.
- Members: Sari Jozokos Morninghawk, Bob Wenzel, Andrew McAuley, Tom Shad, Jesse Kranzler, Kaori Kiki Nakajima
- Past members: Brook Duer, Richard Vitale, Jim Laugelli, John H. Creighton Jr., Chuck Sullivan, Geraldine Murray, David Soule, Anne Galhagher, Lyn Thomas (Freeman), Herman Pearl, Kevin Amos, Daniel Ramirez, Robert “Xeres” Shepard, David Mihaly, J.B.
- Website: Official website

Stick Against Stone is a post-punk / no wave band from Pittsburgh, Pennsylvania, that later resided in Brooklyn, New York, Eugene, Oregon, and San Francisco, California. They remained active (in no less than six incarnations) between 1981 and 1990. The group returned to performing in 2011 and currently resides in the New York City area.

Since their founding, the band went through several line-up changes, but never released a full album until 2010 – and it wasn't until the 2014 release of The Oregon Bootleg Tapes - Live (a live recording from 1985) that critical attention finally arrived in the form of positive reviews in New York Magazine, Vibe, Wax Poetics, Cuepoint (Robert Christgau) and Pitchfork, where writer Miles Raymer remarked about the group: “They had their eyes on the 'there and then', but they were playing 20 years into the future.”

== Discography ==
Releases

- MediaGroove Music:
  - The Index of Directions - (MG-001 - 2010) (digital)
  - Live At Danny's Pub - (MG-002 - 2012) (digital)
  - Get It All Out (as Stick Against Stone Orchestra) - (MG-003 - 2013) (CD, LP & digital)
  - The Oregon Bootleg Tapes - LIVE - (MG-004 - 2014) (CD, digital)
  - Leonard / The Hopping Frog (MG-005 - 2014) (7" vinyl single)
  - INSTANT (MG-006 - 2015) (CD, digital)
  - The Rippel Tapes (MG-008 - 2018) (digital)
  - Eponymous 4 song cassette - released on their own label (SAS - 1985).
- T.M.I. Records:
  - Body Motion - (TMI-015 - 1982) (1 track on a vinyl compilation LP)

== Other links ==
- Press reviews of "The Oregon Bootleg Tapes"
- Pittsburgh Music History (1980s) site on Yahoo! Groups
- Panic 13 (Eugene, OR '80s Music History site) on Yahoo! Groups
- Gigposters.com - Concert Posters of Stick Against Stone from Pittsburgh-area shows and the Rock Against Reagan tour show in Los Angeles, CA
- "Re-Punk Throwdown" - article in Pittsburgh Post-Gazette on the August 2006 reunion concerts of Pittsburgh-area Punk, Post-punk, New Wave and Rock bands from the 80s.
- Yinzer.net - : Collection of Pittsburgh, PA Punk, Post-punk, New Wave and Rock bands from the years 1978-1986
- David Soule (bass player and songwriter in group)
