= Mia Matsumiya =

American violinist

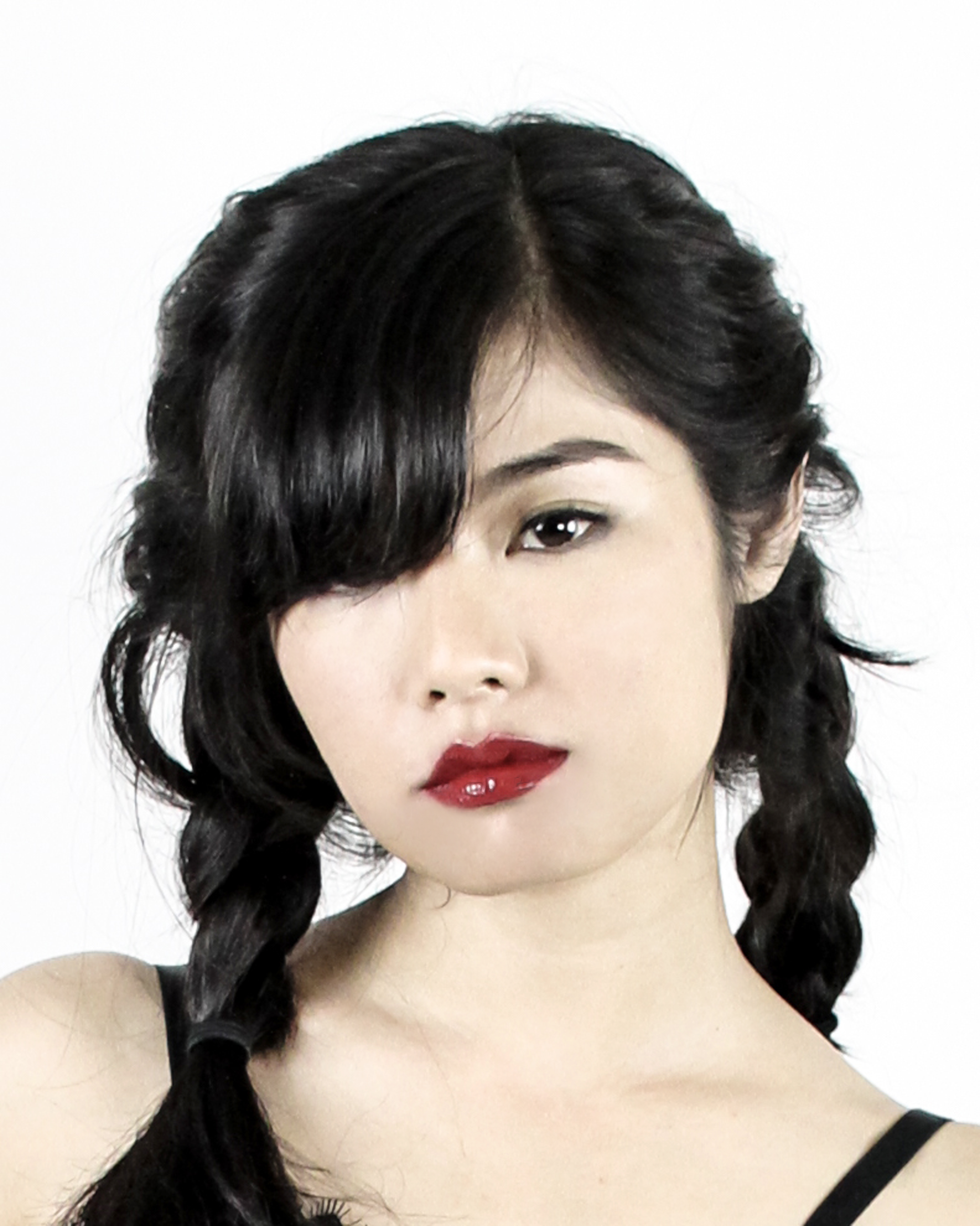
- Matsumiya, in 2015

Background information
- Genres: Avant-garde music Experimental music
- Occupation: Instrumentalist
- Instrument(s): Guitar, violin, viola
- Years active: 2001–present
- Labels: Tzadik Records

Mia Matsumiya is an American violinist who is a former member of Kayo Dot, Gregor Samsa, and Tartar Lamb. She has also performed on albums with Daughters and Ghastly City Sleep. In 2015, her Instagram account chronicling the sexual and other harassment that had been directed toward her on social media during the past ten years received international attention.

== Biography and early work ==
Originally from Needham, Massachusetts, Matsumiya attended the Commonwealth School in Boston for high school. After high school, she attended Sarah Lawrence College in Bronxville, New York, where she left to pursue music. Standing at 4 ft 9 in (145 cm), Matsumiya would often hide in band lockers in middle school and in newspaper racks in later years.

== Bands ==
Matsumiya made her debut on Kayo Dot's 2003 album Choirs of the Eye, as well as their discography for the next ten years. She later appeared on Gregor Samsa's album Rest, and an album with Tartar Lamb. In 2009, she also appeared on Maudlin of the Well's Part the Second.

== Discography ==
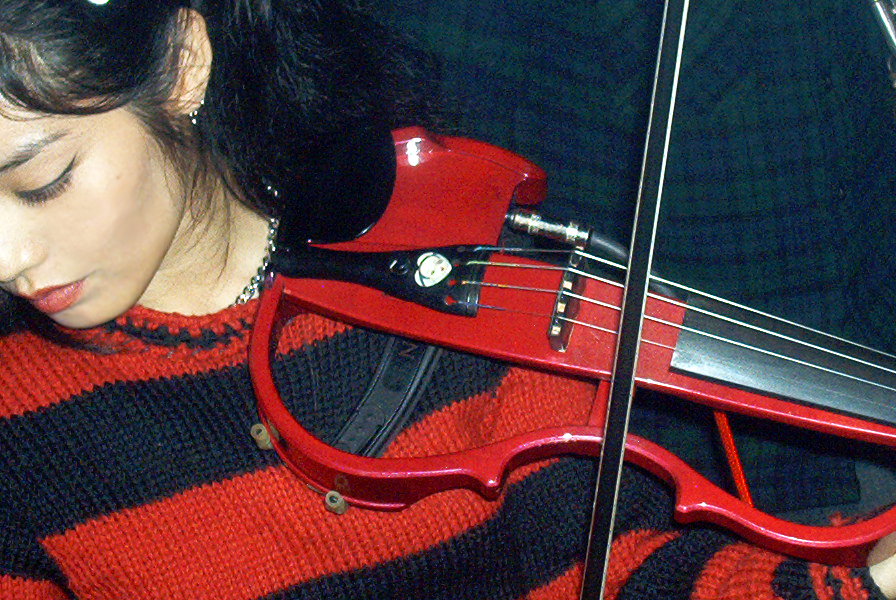
Matsumiya, in 2006

=== With Maudlin of the Well ===
- Part the Second (2009)

=== With Kayo Dot ===
- Choirs of the Eye (2003)
- Dowsing Anemone with Copper Tongue (2006)
- Don't Touch Dead Animals (2006) (split LP with Bloody Panda)
- Blue Lambency Downward (2008)
- Champions of Sound 2008 (2009) (split double 7" with Pelican, Stephen Brodsky, and Zozobra)
- Toying with the Insanities Vol. 1 (2009) (Candiria remix album)
- Coyote (2010)
- Stained Glass EP (2010)
- Gamma Knife (2012)
- Hubardo (2013)

=== With Gregor Samsa ===
- Rest (2008)
- Over Air (2009)

=== With Tartar Lamb ===
- 60 Metonymies (2007)
- Polyimage of Known Exits (2012)

== Filmography ==
- Super (solo violinist)
- The Lazarus Project (solo violinist)
- Santiago (Magic Guitar Player)

== Instagram account ==
In 2015, Matsumiya created the Instagram account called "Perv_magnet", where she uploaded sexually harassing and sometimes violently threatening messages that she had received from men over the past ten years. According to Matsumiya, the project was created to highlight the abuse and misogyny that women face online, as well as the racism she faced. However, she received a small amount of criticism from people who claimed that she uploaded the examples to brag about receiving "compliments", an accusation which she denied. In a 2014 interview with Bearded Gentlemen Music, her former Kayo Dot band member Toby Driver alluded to stalkers that she faced.

== Personal life ==
Matsumiya has a daughter, born in 2016.
