= Kim Abrams =

Kim Abrams is an electronic artist and rock drummer (formerly Keith Abrams), known mostly for her work with Time of Orchids and PAK. She was a frequent collaborator both with Ron Anderson and Jesse Krakow.

Abrams was recruited, along with Jesse Krakow, into Time of Orchids in 1999. In 2003, PAK's bassist Krakow asked band leader Ron Anderson to audition Abrams for PAK - Abrams impressed Anderson with her ability to play a difficult passage, without warming up, much faster than its regular tempo, and so she was admitted to the band. Most recently she has joined fellow PAK member Tim Byrnes in Kayo Dot. Following 2016's release Plastic House on Base of Sky they left the band and drumming and began to release minimal techno music made almost completely with analog equipment and minimal editing/overdubs.

== Discography ==
=== with Time Of Orchids ===
- Melonwhisper (2001)
- Much Too Much Fun (2003)
- Early as Seen in Pace (2004)

=== with PAK ===
- Motel (2005)
- The Ashfield Sessions
- Secret Curve (2011)

=== with Hybegnu ===
- Hybegnu

=== with Giggle the Ozone ===
- Order

=== with Kayo Dot ===
- Gamma Knife (2012)
- Hubardo (2013)
- Coffins on Io (2014)
- Plastic House on Base of Sky (2016)
- Live at Reggie's, Chicago, March 21, 2014 (2020)

=== with Fotgjengeren ===
- Distained and Untwined (2014)

=== with Infantephant (on bass guitar) ===
- Cyclelicoptippopacalypse (2013)

=== with Psalm Zero ===
- Sparta (2020)

=== as BOLKENYOLTE ===
- PreDeter (2017)

=== as KM Abrams ===
- All Set (EP) (2018)
- Rename/Replace (2020)
