= Pet Bottle Ningen =

Pet Bottle Ningen are an avant-garde band formed New York City in 2009. They have played at various locations in the United States, particularly in New York, such as John Zorn's The Stone, and have also toured internationally, particularly Tokyo. Their self-titled album was released in the Tzadik Spotlight series. Deli Magazine describes them as "Exactly what a hardcore vegan, hot-shit jazz drummer, and Japanese child prodigy should sound like: intense, marginalized, replete with comedic moments of the socially dubious kind, a damn entertaining road trip. "

== Members ==
- Dave Scanlon (guitar)
- Dave Miller (drums)
- Nonoko Yoshida (sax).

== Discography ==
- Pet Bottle Ningen
- Non-Recyclable
