= Gregor Samsa (EP) =

EP by Gregor Samsa
- Released: 2002
- Genre: Post-rock
- Length: 18:04
- Label: Iodine Recordings (United States); Revelation Records (Europe)
- Producer: Gregor Samsa

Gregor Samsa chronology
Gregor Samsa (2002)	27:36 (2003)

Professional ratings
Review scores
Source	Rating
Stylus	

Gregor Samsa was the debut EP released in 2002 by Virginian Post-rock band, Gregor Samsa.

== Track listing ==
1. "◯" – 4:02
2. "◯◯" – 8:31
3. "◯◯◯ [Dm0]" – 5:36

== Contributors ==
- Champ Bennett - guitar, vocals
- Nikki King - Rhodes piano, keyboard, vocals
- Nick Wurz - bass, bowed electric bass
- Nathan Altice - guitar, keyboard
- Earl Yevak - drums
