= The Molecules =

Punk and noise musical group

The Molecules or Molecules is a band.

Ron Anderson formed the Molecules with Chris Millner and Tom Scandura in 1990, a “hyper-brid” style of music, that combined free improvised noise and notes with tightly arranged angular songs. The trio, led by Ron, became known for its frantic shows and bombastic mixture of prog-rock, no wave, noise and punk.

The Molecules played the local San Francisco Bay Area scene relentlessly, including participation in the Bay Area Second Annual Improvised Music Festival, and performances with Elliott Sharp, Sun City Girls, and locals Caroliner Rainbow, Three Day Stubble, Splatter Trio, and Pluto to name a few. They also opened local shows for the Japanese noise acts Boredoms, Ruins, Zeni Geva, Omieda Hatoba, Melt Banana, Space Streakings, CCCC, and Merzbow.

The Molecules recorded six CDs and toured the United States, Europe and Japan many times.

In 1996 John Shiurba became the third bass player for the group after their Japanese and second bassist Ryo was denied entry back into the United States by U.S. Customs.

After some years of not performing The Molecules did a concert in San Francisco in April 2006 and decided to release a CD of new music and a DVD of past performances. The release date was January 2007, which was followed by a West Coast tour from San Francisco to Vancouver, British Columbia, Canada on February 7. Starting May 7 a tour of clubs and festivals in Europe, including the Musique Action Festival in Nancy, France and Festival Terra Terma in Cherbourg, France. The Molecules toured Europe again in November 2007 with concerts in Germany, Switzerland and the Music Unlimited Festival, Wels, Austria. The next performance of The Molecules will be in November 2012 in New York City at John Zorn's downtown performance space The Stone.
