= PAK (band) =

American band

- Origin: New York City, New York, United States
- Years active: 2000–present
- Labels: Tzadik
- Members: Ron Anderson; Kim Abrams; Tim Byrnes
- Past members: Jesse Krakow; Will Redmond; Race Age

PAK is an American, New York City based, band. They are signed to John Zorn's Tzadik label.

PAK was originally formed by Ron Anderson in 2000, after he spent some time with The Molecules. The original line-up consisted of Anderson, Jesse Krakow, Will Redmond, and Race Age. This line-up released the album 100% Human Hair. In 2003, Race Age was replaced by Kim Abrams, Redmond left the group, and that version released Motel, which was well received. This version of the group also performed at the Bowery Poetry Club with Jac Berrocal.

In 2007, Anderson reconfigured the group, switching from guitar to bass, and recruiting Tim Byrnes on various instruments. This version of the group toured Europe (as a duo, with Abrams and Anderson along with occasional guest musicians), and is currently working on their next release. The band played shows in 2012 with Nonoko Yoshida.

== Reviews ==
Norwegian publication Tarkus Magazine described PAK as a combination of Otis Redding, Captain Beefheart, Gentle Giant and Talking Heads. Glenn Astaria of Jazz Review described Motel as a "tangled web of complexities complete with off-kilter ostinatos, driving bass lines and peppery horns". Alex Lozupone described a 2008 show at The Stone as "varying amounts of frantic, synchronized playing ... more ambient noise pieces ... some nice established grooves ... chess references, keyboard sounds that brought back memories of Mr Bungle's first album, some synchronized sax and trumpet playing, a nigh-hardcore song in Spanish, an amazing drum solo in a time signature that felt like it might be 29/16 or 31/16, and equipment emitting an interesting plastic smoky smell (that) made for a memorable night.".

== Discography ==
- 2003 - 100% Human Hair
- 2005 - Motel
- 2009 - The Ashfield Sessions
- 2011 - Secret Curve

== Line-ups ==
- Version 1 - Ron Anderson, Jesse Krakow, Will Redmond, Race Age (2000-2002)
- Version 2 - Ron Anderson, Jesse Krakow, Race Age (2002)
- Version 3 - Ron Anderson, Jesse Krakow, Kim Abrams (2003 to 2006)
- Version 4 - Ron Anderson, Kim Abrams, Tim Byrnes (2007 to present)
