= Kayo Dot =

American avant-garde metal band

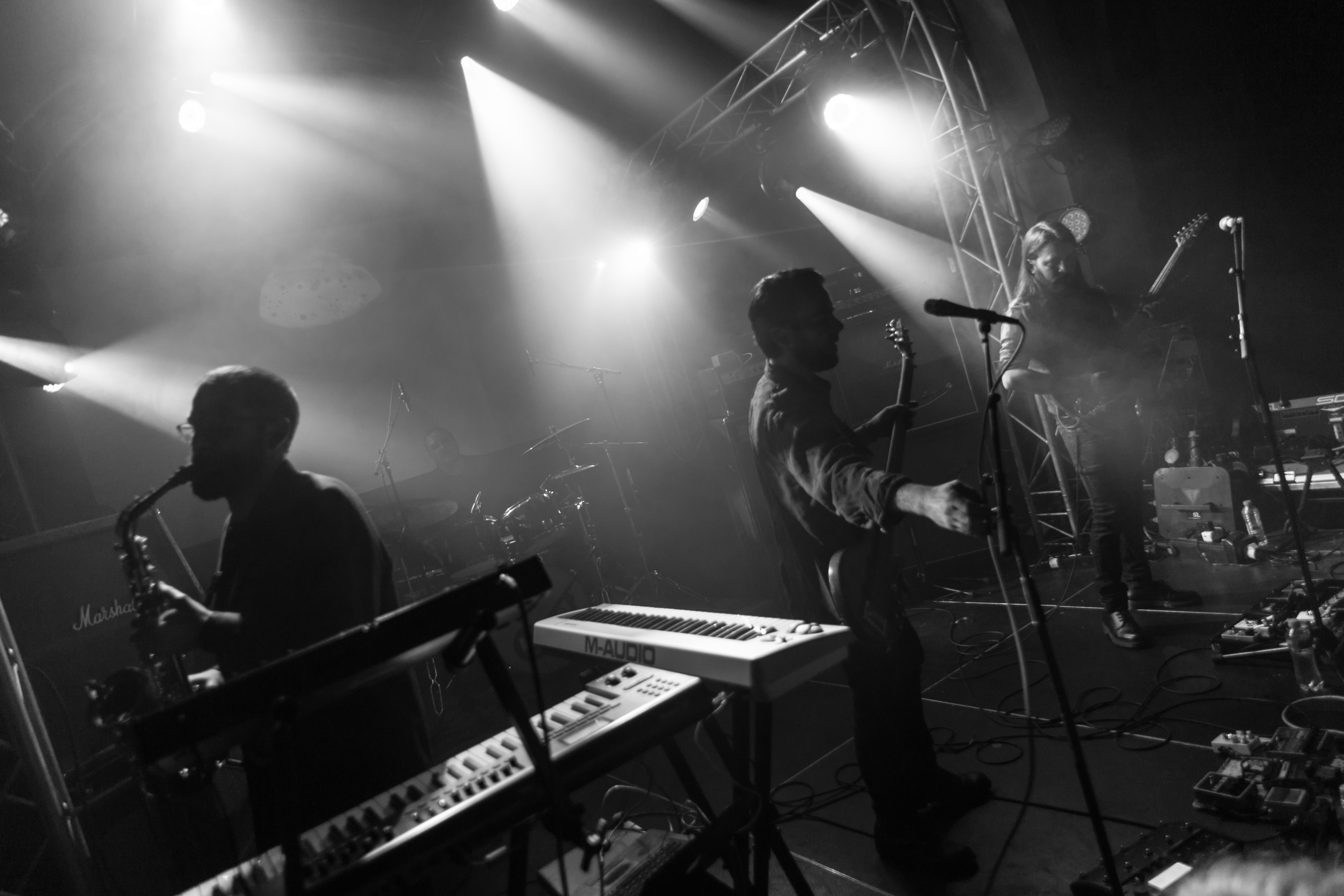
- Kayo Dot performing at Roadburn Festival 2015

Background information
- Origin: Boston, Massachusetts, U.S.
- Genres: Avant-garde metal; progressive metal; post-rock; chamber; drone
- Years active: 2003–present
- Labels: The Flenser; Ice Level; Hydra Head; Robotic Empire; Tzadik; Holy Roar
- Members: Toby Driver; Greg Massi; Jason Byron
- Past members: Kim Abrams; Daniel Means; Mia Matsumiya; Terran Olson; David Bodie; Sam Gutterman; Nicholas Kyte; Tim Byrnes; Patrick Wolff; Johannes Doepping; Russell Greenberg; Ryan McGuire; Forbes Graham; John Carchia; D.J. Murray; Tom Malone
- Website: kayodot.net

Kayo Dot is an American avant-garde metal band from Boston, Massachusetts, formed in 2003 by Toby Driver after the break-up of Maudlin of the Well. The band revolves around the partnership of Driver and Jason Byron, with Driver writing the music and Byron writing the lyrics.

The band released their debut album Choirs of the Eye on John Zorn's Tzadik Records in 2003. Their lineup has drastically changed over the years with Driver remaining the sole consistent performing member. Kayo Dot's sound features a wide variety of instrumentation including guitar, drums, bass, violin, saxophone, vibraphone, synthesizers, clarinets and flutes. The band is currently based in Brooklyn, New York.

Over the years, in addition to the rotating lineup and constantly changing sounds, Kayo Dot has been signed to a number of different record labels, Tzadik, Robotic Empire, Hydra Head, Driver's self-release imprint, Ice Level Music, The Flenser, and Prophecy Productions. AllMusic describes them as a meld of "progressive, atmospheric, and black metal with abstract electro-acoustic and modern chamber composition, as well as gothic rock."

The band has released eleven studio albums, one EP and one split throughout their ongoing tenure.

== History ==
=== 2003–2004: Formation and Choirs of the Eye ===
The mildly acclaimed progressive metal band Maudlin of the Well disbanded in late 2002. Several members of Maudlin formed Kayo Dot in early 2003, with vocalist and multi-instrumentalist Toby Driver leading the group. The band's initial lineup included Driver (vocals, guitar, electronics), Greg Massi (guitar, vocals), Nicholas Kyte (bass, vocals), Sam Gutterman (drums, vocals) and Terran Olson (keyboards, flute, clarinet, saxophone). When asked about the meaning of the band's name, Driver said it was meaningless and "the letters in the name are just a combination of clues from my past that give the name a nostalgic meaning to me and no one else."

Rather than using the same band format as Maudlin of the Well, early performances saw Kayo Dot playing as an orchestra of sorts, with many members playing different instruments on stage. John Zorn's famous avant-garde label Tzadik signed the act in 2003, and Choirs of the Eye was released in late 2003. The album was very well-received, and many regard it as one of the best metal albums of the 2000s. Toby Driver would later go on to say that Choirs of the Eye developed because "Kayo Dot is just a natural extension of the places MOTW was heading". After reading online forums in which fans of Opeth and MOTW bickered over compositional styles, Driver decided to make a "through-composed metal album ... one without riffs or arbitrarily repeating parts." This shift in style became the trademark post-metal or avant-garde metal sound the band is currently known for. Kayo Dot played the album in its entirety in 2010 at The Stone in New York City and again in August 2015.

=== 2005–2007: Dowsing Anemone with Copper Tongue ===
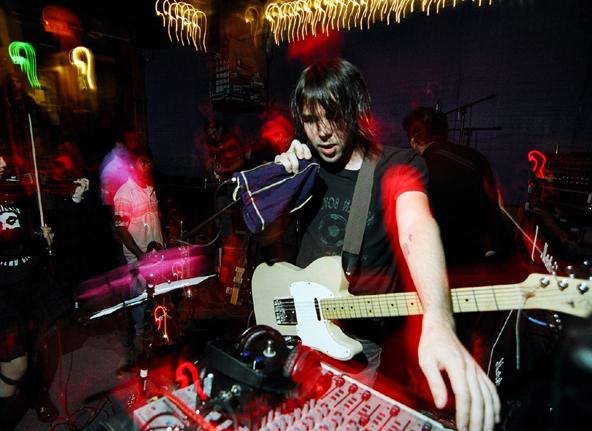
Kayo Dot c. 2006

In March 2005, longtime collaborator and former MOTW member Sam Gutterman left the group to pursue other musical ventures. Tom Malone signed on to replace Gutterman in 2005. Kayo Dot then signed to Robotic Empire Records and released its second album, Dowsing Anemone with Copper Tongue in January 2006. The album was released to good reviews, receiving a 7.7 from Pitchfork, and garnering the band more recognition in the indie metal circle. The album also received a rave review from Sputnikmusic, in which it received a 4.5/5 and was named as one of the best albums of 2006. The band then embarked on a lengthy fall tour before taking a short hiatus, during which two guitarists, the bassist and the trumpet player-left the band for "personal reasons." Despite concerns that there was bad blood between members, Greg Massi said on his blog that he left the group on "good terms" and that "he was going to try and figure out other aspects of my musical life and take some time to figure out where I want to be going." Massi went solo under the moniker Baliset and embarked on a tour shortly afterward. He did, however, guest perform with the group to perform its seminal album Choirs of the Eye at The Stone in New York City in 2010.

In late 2006, Kayo Dot left Robotic Empire and signed with Hydra Head Records. Despite retaining only two members (Driver and long time collaborator Mia Matsumiya), the band started work on a new album in late 2007.

=== 2008–2009: Blue Lambency Downward ===
After signing to Hydra Head, Kayo Dot began working on their third album, Blue Lambency Downward, which was released in May 2008. Driver and Matsumiya used several session musicians on this recording, including Skerik on saxophone and vibraphone, Hans Teuber on clarinet, and Charlie Zeleny on drums. Additionally, Randall Dunn was enlisted as producer and recording engineer. This album marked the first time Driver allowed one of his recordings to be produced by someone other than himself. After the album's release, Driver relocated from Boston to New York City for the purpose of touring the album. A new lineup was assembled, including Patrick Wolff on woodwinds, Daniel Means on woodwinds and guitar, David Bodie on drums and original (and former Maudlin of the Well) member Terran Olson on woodwinds and keyboards.

Despite a successful tour, the album was not received as well as previous releases. Allmusic and Drowned in Sound gave it mostly positive reviews, but it was panned by Pitchfork, who gave it a score of 3.3 out of 10. Among other complaints, the Pitchfork review stated that Blue Lambency Downward had few memorable moments.

=== 2010–2012: Coyote, Stained Glass, and Gamma Knife ===
After the poor critical reception and fan response to Blue Lambency Downward, Driver began working on a new long-form composition with Yuko Sueta, a NYC-based writer, filmmaker, and video artist. A first draft of this piece was premiered at The Stone in September 2008 by The Kayo Dot Auxiliary Unit, which consisted of David Bodie and Daniel Means of Kayo Dot, Yuko Sueta, and Tim Byrnes on trumpet. Shortly after, Sueta became incapacitated by breast cancer. Driver then re-drafted and adapted the piece, which was recorded in Seattle during June–July 2009 with Randall Dunn at the production helm. A tour with Secret Chiefs 3 followed, after which the album was released as 2010's Coyote on Hydra Head. Sueta died while the record was in post-production, which compelled the band to dedicate their performance to her. The album featured a rotating lineup of Driver on bass and vocals, Terran Olson on keyboards, David Bodie on drums, Mia Matsumiya on violin, Tim Byrnes on trumpet, and Daniel Means on woodwinds. Despite receiving mixed reviews, some sources (including PopMatters) praised Coyote for its concept.

Immediately after Coyote, Kayo Dot released an EP entitled Stained Glass in November 2010. It featured a guest guitar solo by Trey Spruance of Secret Chiefs 3 and Mr. Bungle fame. Stained Glass was partially recorded at Zing Studios in Westfield, Massachusetts, by Jim Fogarty, and partially by Toby Driver at his home studio. Consisting of one self-titled track, the twenty-minute EP was released on CD by Hydra Head Records and on LP by Antithetic Records in early 2011. Stained Glass features lyrics by Jason Byron, but only some of the ones written were actually sung on the album. The remaining lyrics appear in the liner notes, some of which were later used in Jason Byron's book, "The Sword of Satan" which was included with the LP release of Hubardo in 2013. Like Coyote, Stained Glass was released to mixed reviews. The critical and commercial failure of these albums, resulted in Kayo Dot and Hydra Head mutually parting ways.

Kayo Dot was left without financial support from a label and decided to stay independent, so the band recorded the album Gamma Knife live at a concert in Brooklyn, New York on October 5, 2011. The album was different in that it was recorded with a budget of zero dollars via six channels of microphones into a laptop helmed by a friend of the band, composer Jeremiah Cymerman. The concert featured several moments of audience participation. It received moderately good reception and was seen as a return to the group's metal roots. It was self-released on their own imprint Ice Level Music, digitally on January 4, 2012, on Bandcamp and later by another record company, Antithetic Records on CD and LP. The lineup remained the same, except Kim Abrams played drums on the album. Gamma Knife was received critically better than the past few albums, as SputnikMusic gave it a 3.5/5 and said "for the first time in years, Kayo Dot feels musically relevant."

=== 2013–2018: Hubardo, Coffins on Io, and Plastic House on Base of Sky ===
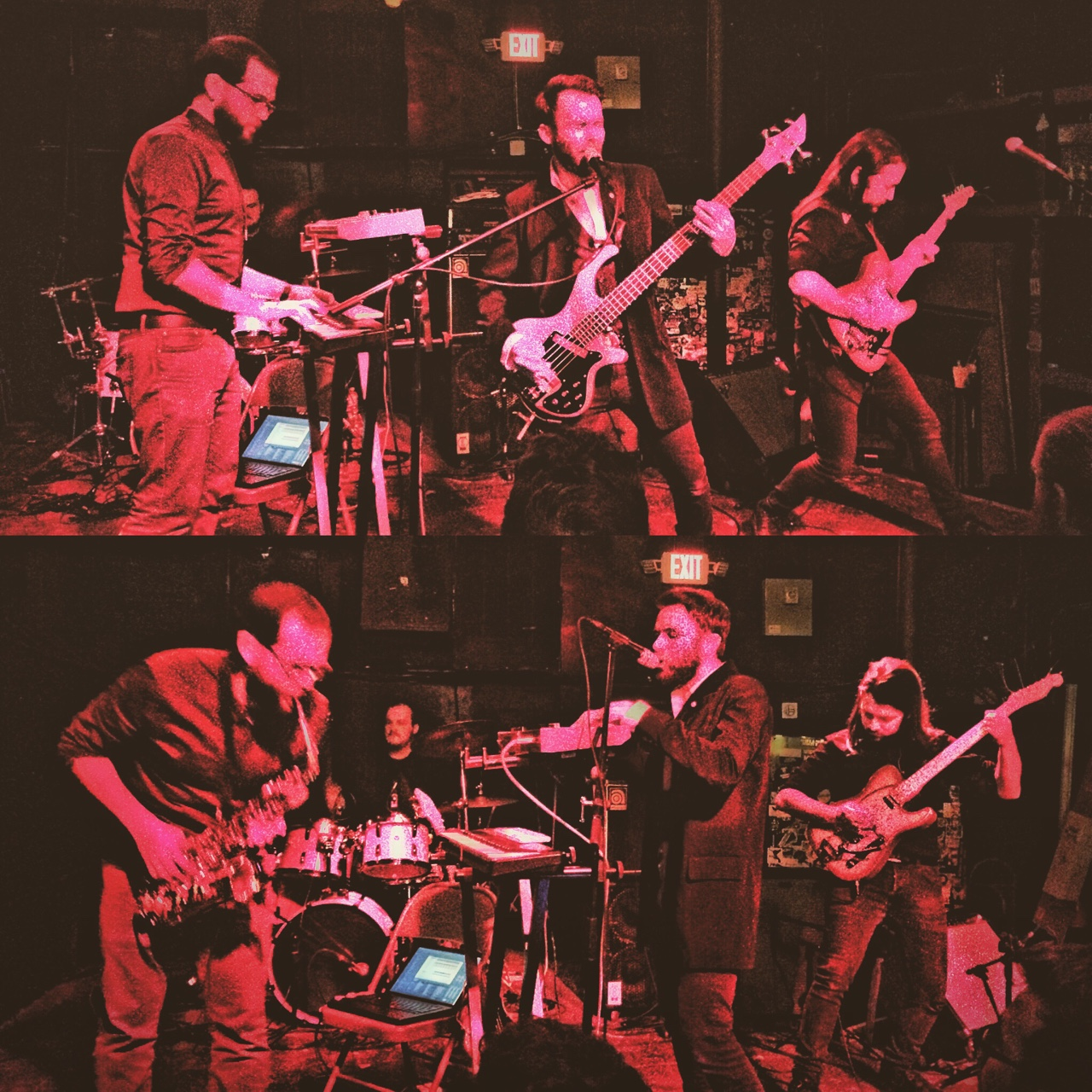
The band in 2015

In 2013, Driver announced a pre-order for Kayo Dot's new concept double-album, which contained approximately 100 minutes of music. Instead of using Kickstarter like many other crowd-funded musical projects, he announced that the album would be financed with money earned from pre-orders. It would be named Hubardo (which means "lamp" in Enochian), and its release would mark the group's ten year anniversary. Driver announced that the album was recorded in the spring of 2013 in Seattle by longtime collaborator Randall Dunn. It was digitally released on September 10, 2013, to widespread acclaim, and received good reviews from multiple sources Through crowd-funding, Kayo Dot self-released a triple LP that sold out immediately, containing a 40-page book/poem by former Maudlin of the Well guest vocalist Jason Byron entitled "The Sword of Satan." Byron also wrote the album's lyrics. The album featured a line up similar to previous albums, with the exception of Byron's guest vocals on the first half of "The Black Stone." This was Byron's first recorded appearance since Maudlin of the Well's Bath and Leaving Your Body Map. It is widely considered a return to the group's metal roots, and was selected as the 4th best album of 2013 by SputnikMusic. Sputnik noted that Hubardo "recalls the black metal chamber music of Choirs of the Eye."

Despite the involvement of Terran Olson and Mia Matsumiya, neither participated in the ensuing tour, except as occasional guest musicians. The U.S. tour for Hubardo commenced in early 2014, and included dates at SXSW. Many dates were sold out.

On July 10, 2014, the band announced a new album called Coffins on Io to be released October 16 via The Flenser. Driver said of the record, "Basically the vibe that we're going for here is inspired by 80s retro-future noir—Blade Runner...I wanted to make a good record to put on while you drive across the desert at night under a toxic, post-apocalyptic atmosphere...There's a weird underlying theme of murder, shame and death." The album was released on October 15, 2014.

Violinist Matsumiya's Instagram screenshots documenting the online abuse she has received were the subject of an October 2015 BBC video.

The band's eighth studio album, Plastic House on Base of Sky, was released on June 24, 2016. The album has been noted to feature an increased influence from electronic music.

=== 2018–present: New albums ===
In September 2018, Kayo Dot signed with the German record label Prophecy Productions, also announcing work had begun on a new album. One year later, in September 2019, Blasphemy was released to positive reviews. Two music videos were created for "Blasphemy: A Prophecy" and "Turbine, Hook & Haul". Both were filmed and edited by Toby Driver. The band's tenth album, Moss Grew on the Swords and Plowshares Alike, was released by Prophecy Productions on October 29, 2021. It received superlative reviews and reached the German Top 100 Album Charts for the first time in the week after its release, November 5, 2021. A video was created for the first single, "Void in Virgo (The Nature of Sacrifice)," by musician, writer, and filmmaker Nick Jack Hudson.

In February 2023, a 20th anniversary tour of Choirs of the Eye took place in select cities around Europe with the entire Maudlin of the Well line-up.

Their eleventh studio album Every Rock, Every Half-Truth Under Reason was released on August 1, 2025.

== Musical style ==
Unlike Maudlin of the Well, Kayo Dot's sound is a mixture of black metal, atmospheric metal, and chamber music. The label on their debut reads, "Kayo Dot powerfully integrates elements of modern classical composition with layers of guitars and vocals more common to rock and metal." The group's sound continually changes from album to album, and this unpredictability has become one of their trademarks.

Early Kayo Dot recordings are notable for their classical leanings and composition, as well as their eclectic instrumentation. Loud walls of guitars and quiet interludes are equally common, which has led to their music being labeled post-metal, post-rock, progressive rock and avant-garde. All of their music is thoroughly composed, with no improvisation. Kayo Dot is known for employing the complex instrumentation of progressive rock, with song lengths and structures reminiscent of classical.

Toby Driver has said that his influences in Kayo Dot include artists such as The Cure, Scott Walker, Emperor, Ulver, John Zorn, Gorguts, Björk, and Susumu Hirasawa. He has denied the presence of jazz in Kayo Dot music.

== Band members ==
=== Current ===
- Toby Driver – vocals, guitar, bass guitar, keyboards, instruments (2003–present)
- Greg Massi – guitar (2003–2006, 2010, 2021–present)
- Jason Byron – lyrics (2003–present), vocals (2013, 2025)
- Terran Olson – keyboards, flute, clarinet, saxophone (2003–2005, 2008–2014, 2023–present)
- Sam Gutterman – drums, vocals (2003–2005, 2023–present)
- Matthew Serra – synth (2019), guitar (2023-present)
- Timba Harris – violin, viola, trumpet (2023–present)

=== Former ===
- Mia Matsumiya – violin, viola, vocals, keyboards, additional guitar (2003–2013)
- Nicholas Kyte – bass, vocals (2003–2005)
- Tom Malone – drums (2005–2006)
- Forbes Graham – trumpet, euphonium (2005–2006)
- John Carchia – guitar (2005–2006, died 2024)
- Ryan McGuire – bass (2005–2006)
- Daniel Means – woodwinds, guitar, keyboards (2008–2018)
- Patrick Wolff – woodwinds (2008, studio guest 2010)
- David Bodie – drums (2008–2010)
- Tim Byrnes – trumpet, French horn, Mellotron (2009–2014, studio guest 2019)
- Kim Abrams – drums (2011–2018)
- Phillip Price – drums (2017–2021)
- Leonardo Didkovsky – drums (2017–2021)

=== Touring ===
- D.J. Murray (2003–2006)
- Johannes Döpping (2011)
- Jeff Tobias – woodwinds, bass (2023–2024)

=== Guests ===
- Adam Scott – trumpet (2003)
- Benjie Messer – trombone (2003)
- Sam Minnich – bassoon (2003)
- Alex Nagle – guitar (2003)
- Sky Cooper – guitar (2003)
- Todd Neece – additional vocals (2003)
- Kyouhei Sada – guitar, keyboards, sound effects, vocals (2006)
- Hans Teuber – soprano & bass clarinets, alto sax, flute (2008)
- Skerik – tenor & baritone sax, vibraphone (2008)
- Dave Abramson – Malletphone and gongs, percussion (2008)
- B.R.A.D. (Brad Mowen) – low vocals (2008)
- Randall Dunn – sound effects, synth design (2008)
- Charlie Zeleny – drums (2008)
- Trey Spruance – guitar (2010)
- Russell Greenberg – vibraphone (2010)
- Sage Riesman, Stacey Winegyn, Bing Minz – violins (2016)
- Roman Celine, Dabe Wyche – violas (2016)
- Alexis Travelion – cello (2016)
- Landen Chelengs – contrabass (2016)
- Bhin Turmes – trumpet (2016)
- Ephraim Narata – flugelhorn (2016)
- Lemuel Bardor – harpsichord (2016)
- Bree Eng – pipe organ (2016)
- Duggan Elston – Hammond organ (2016)
- Valentin Dublev – Mellotron (2016)
- Gloria Hattifer – celesta (2016)
- George Chamdles – Rhodes piano (2016)
- Charmane Tressel – glass harmonica (2016)
- Stelvio Nebulli, Guillaume Veltaj – hand percussion (2016)

== Discography ==
=== Studio albums ===
Release date	Title
2003	Choirs of the Eye
2006	Dowsing Anemone with Copper Tongue
2008	Blue Lambency Downward
2010	Coyote
2012	Gamma Knife
2013	Hubardo
2014	Coffins on Io
2016	Plastic House on Base of Sky
2019	Blasphemy
2021	Moss Grew on the Swords and Plowshares Alike
2025	Every Rock, Every Half-Truth Under Reason

=== Splits, singles, remixes and live albums ===
- Split with Bloody Panda, 2006, Holy Roar Records
- "Twins Eating Fer De Lance," Champions of Sound 2008 compilation, 2009, Hydra Head Records
- Live In Bonn, Germany: October 7, 2009
- Stained Glass, 2010, Hydra Head Records
- "Pages" remix on Candiria's Toying With The Insanities, vol. 1
- "COYOTE" Live on WMBR, Cambridge, Massachusetts: August 2012
