= Ron Anderson (musician) =

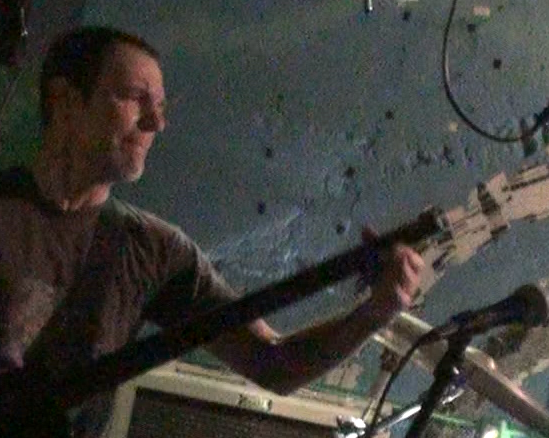
- Ron Anderson with PAK in 2010

Background information
- Born: 1959 (age 66–67)
- Genres: Progressive rock, free jazz
- Instruments: guitar, bass
- Member of: The Molecules
- Formerly of: PAK

Ron Anderson (born 1959) is a New York City-based internationally known musician and composer. He is known for collaborations with many famous musicians, and has a large catalog of releases and compositions.

== History ==
Anderson formed the group Rat At Rat R in Philadelphia in 1980. Anderson then moved to New York City in the early 1980s, where he recorded music for NPR as well as museum pieces. In 1989 he moved to California, where he formed The Molecules. In 1998 he moved to Switzerland, returning to New York City in 1999, where he formed PAK.

== Projects ==
=== Molecules ===
Ron's first project was a band called The Molecules, who has a number of releases. A retrospective, Friends, received positive reviews.

=== PAK ===
Ron's current project is called PAK, which first released, Motel. PAK has had a line-up change recently but still performs in the New York area, notably at John Zorn's selective club, The Stone. In 2011 the Pak album Secret Curve was released on Zorn's Tzadik label.

=== Ronruins ===
Ron collaborated with Japanese musician Tatsuya Yoshida's project Ruins to create Ronruins, which released one album, Big Shoes. When Yoshida performs in NeW York, Ronruins will frequently be a part of the act.

=== Jac ===
Anderson performed a show with French musician Jac Berrocal at the Bowery Poetry club in New York City. They were also working on an as-yet-unreleased CD.

== Partial discography ==
- Be the First on the Block to Eat the Snake [with Jason Willett] (2007)
- $100 Guitar Project (2013)

Pak

- Small R 1/2 Inch (1998, Rastascan)
- 100% Human Hair
- Motel (2005, Ra Sounds)
- Secret Curve (2011, Tzadik)
- NYJPN (2015)

The Molecules

- Friends (2007, Ra Sounds)
