= Psychological horror (film and television) =

Film genre that combines aspects of horror film and psychological film

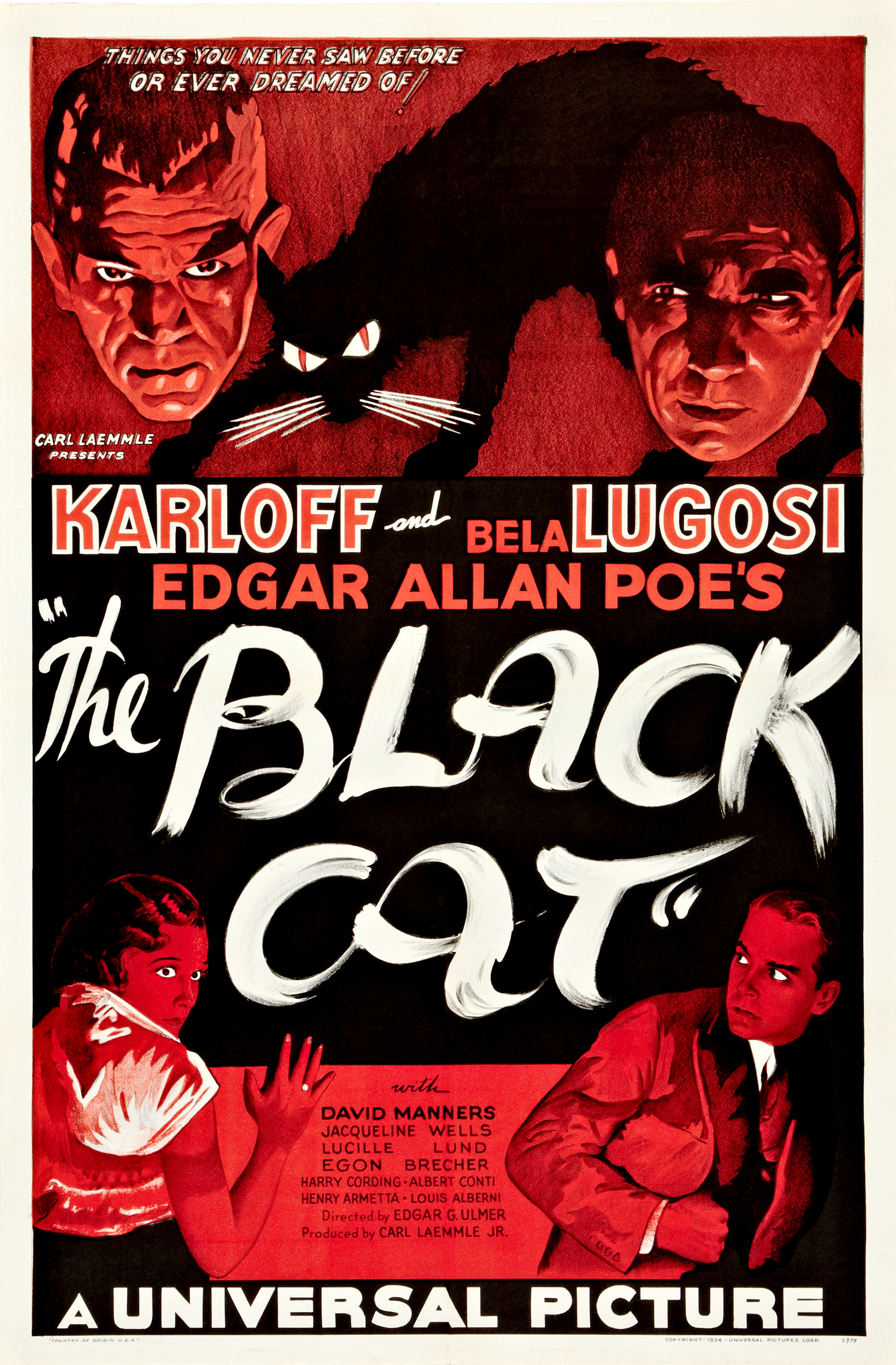
Theatrical release poster for the American horror film The Black Cat (1934).

In films and television series, psychological horror creates tension through exploiting the shared psychological and emotional vulnerabilities of the human psyche, differing from traditional horrors, where the source of the fear are material threats like grotesque monsters, serial killers, or aliens, as well as the splatter and slasher film genres which derive its frightening effects from gore and graphic violence. In Jungian psychology, this concept aligns with the "shadow" archetype, which encompasses darker, often repressed human traits like dread and paranoia of others, oneself, and the world.

== Characteristics ==
Bill Gibron of PopMatters defined psychological horror films as a genre that prompts tension and unease, relying on the audience's or character's imagination to fill in what isn't explicitly shown on screen. Rather than drawing out a visible threat, like zombies in an apocalyptic terrain, the anticipation of a threat is drawn out. This cinematic and storyline element in psychological horror films builds an atmosphere of doubt and confusion among the audience. Gibron ultimately characterized the genre as a "clouded gray area" that lies somewhere between graphic splatter horror and a more unsettling, cerebral cinematic experience.

However, academic Susan Hayward suggested that the terms "psychological horror" and "slasher film" are often interchangeable, both falling under the broader category of "horror-thrillers," and share thematic similarities—particularly in the portrayals of "vicious normalization of misogyny." She noted that in both genres, male characters often derive their sense of identity from their relationship to women, whom they then kill—frequently with knives or chainsaws—reinforcing their own distorted sense of power. In a publication titled Feminist Frameworks for Horror Films, Cynthia Freeland critiques how the existing approaches to horror films primarily align with male viewer interests. Unlike the femme fatale archetype, involving a mysterious and seductive female character that enchants the protagonists into traps, women in horror films are formed by male-determined frameworks.

Since psychological horror films highlight internal conflicts, favoring scenarios that are more grounded in realism than the fantastical elements of supernatural horrors, the genre often challenges the audience's understanding of the narrative by focusing on characters who question their perception of reality and/or their mental stability. For example, the television series Hannibal (2013) follows the destructive relationship between FBI profiler Will Graham and his therapist Dr. Hannibal Lecter, who is secretly a cannibalistic serial killer, and the titular antagonist in The Silence of the Lambs by Thomas Harris. Graham grapples with emotional trauma, hallucinations, and mental disorders throughout the series while Dr. Lecter manipulates and gaslights him—blurring the lines between the hard truth and digestible lies.

Psychological horror films often employ unreliable narrators like Graham to suggest that certain elements of the story are misperceived, causing viewers to experience confusion. Alternatively, characters who might appear mentally stable are placed in scenarios where they interact with others who are not—similar to the physician Edwin who works alongside killers in the science fiction film Predators (2010), or the passive husband Lester Nygaard in the crime drama series Fargo (2014). Furthermore, in the critically acclaimed motion picture The Silence of the Lambs (1991), prospective FBI agent Clarice Starling is recruited to interview the imprisoned Dr. Lecter about another serial killer case. In these stories, mental conflict plays a central role, particularly as characters confront morally corrupt situations.

=== Cinematic techniques ===
Audience fear is considered to be a defining characteristic in horror films. Filmmakers orchestrate audience fear through specific cinematic techniques to heighten tension and unease among their viewers. While filmmaking techniques might differ across regions and time periods, there are shared visual and storyline elements that better influence a viewer's emotional state during psychological horror films. These elements include, but are not limited to, music and sound, lighting, and story pacing.

==== Music and sound ====
In the 1980s, researchers Thayer and Ellison conducted studies examining how different types of music affected the psychological response to stressful visual stimuli. Using dermal electromagnetic measurements to track physiological reactions while participants watched and listened, they discovered that combining stressful music with intense visual images led to stronger psychological reactions than when the same visuals were paired with neutral or non-stressful sounds. The study also found that music with a positive tone influenced viewers to interpret the accompanying visuals more positively, while music with a negative tone made the visuals appear more threatening or unsettling. Professor Blumstein from the Department of Ecology and Evolutionary Biology at the University of California discovered in the screams of yellow-bellied marmots how "nonlinear chaotic noise" in nature was associated with danger or distress.

Academic Xiangyi Fu connects Blumstein's observations with the iconic notes played in Jaws (1975) before characters were about to get attacked by the great white shark. "In The Shining, sound designers even used recordings of animal screams in the film," Fu wrote. Classical music emerged in both The Silence of the Lambs and Hannibal to align with Dr. Lecter's intellectual demeanor along with a more eerie, experimental soundtrack that better mirrored the grim realities that surrounded the cat and mouse dynamic between the serial killer(s) and FBI agents.

Furthermore, in a body horror film titled The Substance (2024), the goth-style song "Ugly and Vengeful" by Swedish artist Anna von Hausswolff provided an intense backdrop for the film's blood-soaked finale. Screenwriters, producers, and sound designers are especially responsible for matching specific songs to pinnacle moments in the storyline that further develop character traits and thematic points in the film.

==== Lighting ====
As evident in the horror thriller film Bird Box (2018) and The Substance, dim lighting limits both the character's and the audience's awareness of potential threats. Visual obstructions, in general, leave the audience in a state of uncertainty and terror, questioning what could be occurring right outside the camera's field of vision. In Watcher (2022), Julia and her Romanian husband move to an apartment in Bucharest, where Julia soon discovers a neighbor watching her from their living room window. Interior scenes in the film are dimly lit and Julia is frequently the central focus, which establishes the unsettling nature of the film and heightens audience paranoia at who could be following her in the blurred background. A similar paranoia is composed in the supernatural horror Smile (2022), where interior apartment scenes are often dark and isolated—conventionally, an ideal horror movie setting.

==== Story pacing ====
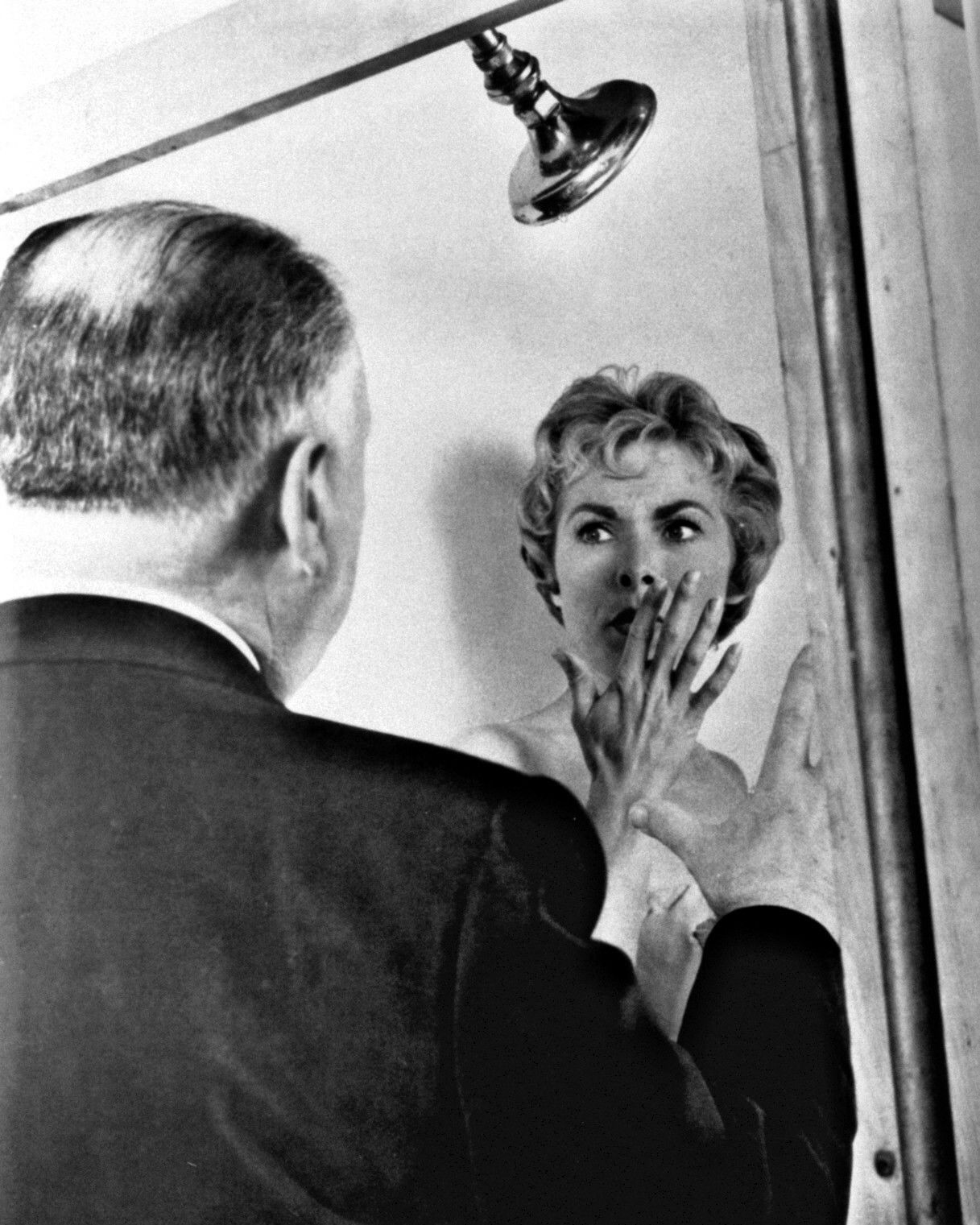
Alfred Hitchcock and actress Janet Leigh from Psycho (1960).

Story pacing is another notable cinematic technique in psychological horror films, expressly the lapse in time between the character's and audience's knowledge. Alfred Hitchcock's iconic shower scene in Psycho (1960) illustrates Marion Crane facing away from the bathroom door when the killer enters. At this point in time, the audience can see the killer behind Crane. This period of time between the audience's foreknowledge and Crane's terror when the killer pulls back the shower curtain and raises his knife intensifies the dramatization of the scene.

Linda Williams, in her article Film Bodies: Gender, Genre, and Excess, talks about how "[s]ome of the most violent and terrifying moments of the horror film genre occur in moments when the female victim meets the psycho-killer-monster unexpectedly, before she is ready. The female victims who are not ready for the attack die. This surprise encounter, too early, often takes place at a moment of sexual anticipation when the female victim thinks she is about to meet her boyfriend or lover."

== History ==
Scholars and film historians have proposed different starting points for the psychological horror genre. Though noted historian David J. Skal regarded The Black Cat (1934) as "the first psychological horror film in America," Hayward traced its emergence to the post-World War II era, citing films like Psycho and Peeping Tom (1960) as key examples. However, Psycho was notably inspired by the French film Les Diaboliques (1955). Based on the novel Celle qui n'était plus (which translates to She Who Was No More in English), Les Diaboliques follows the alleged drowning of a cruel headmaster who is rumored to be alive and well as the film progresses. Hayward described the film as "preoccupied with the failure to know the intentionality of other people's acts." Daniel Tilsley writes in Existential and Phenomenological Horror in Les Diaboliques, that the protagonist's "direction is focused on this idea of misdirection, making audiences believe that the events occurring on screen are other than what they are.

The audience is made to believe that they are watching a horror film, just as the protagonist Christina (Vera Clouzot) is made to believe that the world she inhabits is irrational and supernatural [...] Les Diaboliques is a psychological thriller disguised as a supernatural horror film." Andrew Tudor, a professor for the School of Arts and Creative Technologies at the University of York, argued how the sudden emergence of psychological horror films in the 1960s and 1970s "owe more to Les Diaboliques than to Psycho." The film prompted a shift from portraying external horrors to portraying internal ones, reflecting distorted perception and irrational fears that came with the Second World War and French existentialism.

=== Regional psychological horrors ===
The Italian film genre known as giallo often employs psychological horror or elements of the psychological horror subgenre. The subgenre is also a staple in Asian countries. Japanese horror films, commonly referred to as "J-horror", have been noted to be generally of a psychological horror nature. Notable examples are Ring (1998) and the Ju-On series. Another influential category is the Korean horror films, commonly referred to as "K-horror". Notable examples are A Tale of Two Sisters (2003), Hansel and Gretel (2007), and Whispering Corridors (1998).

== Effects on audiences ==
Researchers questioning why college students would pay to watch a horror movie in theaters concluded how "the fictional nature of horror films affords viewers a sense of control by placing psychological distance between them and the violent acts they have witnessed." Horror movies allow for audiences to experience fear at a distance. Viewers are perfectly aware that what they witness on the big screen is not real since it does not resemble their lives or present realities.

Although, since psychological horror delves further into the complex human psyche, portraying the internal horrors of mental illness or deception, the distance between viewers and what occurs on the big screen is much more narrow. Psychologist Glenn D. Walters reasons in his paper "Understanding the Popular Appeal of Horror Cinema: An Integrated Interactive Model" how, in addition to introducing fantastical experiences and meticulous cinematic techniques, another motivation for watching horror is the horror genre's relevance. Academic Michelle Park writes: "The audience finds some kind of relevance in the film, whether it can be universal like the fear of death, the unknown, or cultural, social, religious relevance. For example, South Korea is a highly competitive country and is one of the countries with the highest suicidal deaths. Because of strict studies in middle school and high schools, many students commit suicide by falling off of the rooftop of their school. There are many films with young girls coming back to haunt their enemies with long black hair and pale skin—a highly profitable film genre due to its social relevance."

Whether or not the audience is emotionally distant from horror films, generally, the human body will follow the fight-flight-freeze response. Abigail Marsh, a psychology professor, breaks down human responses to fear as it pertains to chemicals in the brain. She illustrates how the fear "signal" travels to the base of the brain (the amygdala) and fires glutamate into two regions of the brain. One region causes viewers to involuntarily freeze or leap away, and the other triggers the fight-flight-freeze instinct (located in the hypothalamus). Heightened heart rate and blood pressure cause a swell in adrenaline. Park learned in an interview with Marsh how freezing was an "evolutionary response to keep [...] hidden from predators," and "adrenaline helps [...] to run away quickly, and fight."

Dr. Deirdre Johnston's (1995) study, however, categorized different responses to horror into the following four profiles: gore watchers, thriller watchers, independent watchers, and problem watchers.

- Gore watchers: Share low empathy and high sensation seeking throughout the film. Male gore watchers identify closely with the killer.
- Thrill Watchers: Share high empathy and sensation seeking, enjoying suspense drawn out throughout the film. Thrill watchers identify with the victim(s).
- Independent Watchers: Experience positive emotions from overcoming the initial fear and empathize with the victim(s).
- Problem Watchers: Experience helplessness while empathizing with the victim(s).

== See also ==
- Conte cruel
- Gothic fiction
- Hitchcockian
- Horror and terror
- Paranoid fiction

== Bibliography ==
- Gibron, Bill (July 31, 2013). "What Exactly is a "Psychological" Horror Film?". PopMatters. Archived from the original on August 17, 2018.
- Hayward, Susan (2001) [2000]. Cinema Studies: The Key Concepts (2nd ed.). Routledge. ISBN 0-415-22739-9.
- Reid, Robin Anne (2009). Women in Science Fiction and Fantasy: Overviews. ABC-CLIO. ISBN 978-0313335914.
- Skal, David J. (2001). The Monster Show: A Cultural History of Horror. Farrar, Straus and Giroux. ISBN 0571199968.
