= Ceremony (Anna von Hausswolff album) =

Studio album by Anna von Hausswolff
- Released: 18 July 2012
- Recorded: 2012
- Studios: Annedal Church (Gothenburg); Filip Leyman's studio (Gothenburg)
- Genres: Gothic pop; folk; drone; art pop; post-rock; noise; ambient
- Length: 60:59
- Languages: English; Swedish
- Labels: Kning Disk; City Slang; Other Music
- Producer: Filip Leyman

Anna von Hausswolff chronology
Singing from the Grave (2010)	Ceremony (2012)	The Miraculous (2015)

Singles from Ceremony
- 1. "Mountains Crave" Released: 28 June 2012; 2. "Funeral for My Future Children" Released: 23 September 2013

Ceremony is the second studio album by Swedish musician Anna von Hausswolff. It was released on 18 July 2012 in Sweden by Kning Disk. The album was followed by a worldwide re-release in Europe and North America in June and July 2013, respectively. Ceremony incorporates the pipe organ, which was recorded at the Annedal Church in Gothenburg and became von Hausswolff's first work to include that instrument. Ceremony is primarily a gothic pop record that spans from folk to drone styles, but also art pop, post-rock, noise, and ambient. The death of the singer's grandfather inspired the lyrical content from the album.

Ceremony received positive reviews from music critics, who praised its innovative sound in comparison to her debut. It received nominations at the Grammis Awards, and the Nordic Music Prize. The album was a commercial success in Sweden, peaking at number 5 on the Swedish Albums Chart. Two singles supported the album: "Mountains Crave" and "Funeral for My Future Children". The songs "Epitaph of Theodor", "Deathbed", and "Epitaph of Daniel" received music videos despite not being promoted as official singles.

== Background and recording ==
After releasing her debut album Singing from the Grave (2010), von Hausswolff moved from Gothenburg, Sweden to Copenhagen, Denmark. During that time, she played a synthesizer that featured the sound of a pipe organ, which gave her interest in that instrument. The album was recorded at the Annedal Church in Gothenburg which, despite having a small organ, von Hausswolff said that it "sounds really big because of the massive room, with cold walls made of stone." She previously performed in that church at the 2009 Way Out West.

The singer stated that during the recording of Ceremony in 2012, she played the pipe organ for the first time; the instrument would later become prominent in her following albums. She added that "[o]nce I sat down and started playing, I knew that this was going to be a longterm relationship." The album was worked on over several months at producer Filip Leyman's Gothenburg studio. Von Hausswolff uploaded a series of YouTube clips of the recording process in the studio between May and June 2012.

== Music and lyrics ==
Ceremony blends several musical styles. Primarily a gothic pop album, it also combines folk, drone, art pop, post-rock, noise, and ambient. The album makes prominent use of the pipe organ in nine tracks, differing sonically from Singing from the Grave, which used the piano as the main instrument. Other instruments present in Ceremony are piano, synthesizers, hand-claps, bass guitar, and discordant percussion. The lyrical themes are predominantly about death and loss, with von Hausswolff saying that the death of her grandfather inspired the album. Fabiana Giovanetti of London in Stereo wrote that "the lyrics are positively Byron-esque, resembling the British Romantic decadence of the 1800s.

=== Songs ===
Ceremony opens with the track "Epitaph of Theodor", an instrumental that incorporates a church organ melody. It is followed by "Deathbed", in which von Hausswolff's voice does not appear until the middle of the song, and then returns to instrumental. The longest track in the album, it is an 8-minute cut that features organ, brushed cymbals, and echoing guitar, as well as her voice that "soars operatically and growls emphatically". "Mountains Crave" is a pop song built on three chords and features a "rudimentary 808 snare clap." "Epitaph of Daniel" was compared to the work of Angelo Badalamenti for the series Twin Peaks.

"No Body" serves as an interlude that experiments with noise and ambient genres, while "Liturgy of Light" is a folk song "that sounds like it's being played in a subterranean cave." "Harmonica" was written after von Hausswolff's grandfather, who gave her a harmonica before he died. The track discusses "how culture and traditions can travel from generation down to generation." In "Ocean", the singer's "[Kate] Bush-like" vocals are accompanied by piano and a gospel choir. "Sova" is the only track from the album sung in Swedish, von Hausswolff's native language, and is backed by percussion, crashing guitars, and thunderous drums. The "bleakly dramatic"-titled "Funeral for My Future Children" is a chamber pop song based on a clattering rhythm that combines her soaring vocals with pipe organ.

== Release and promotion ==
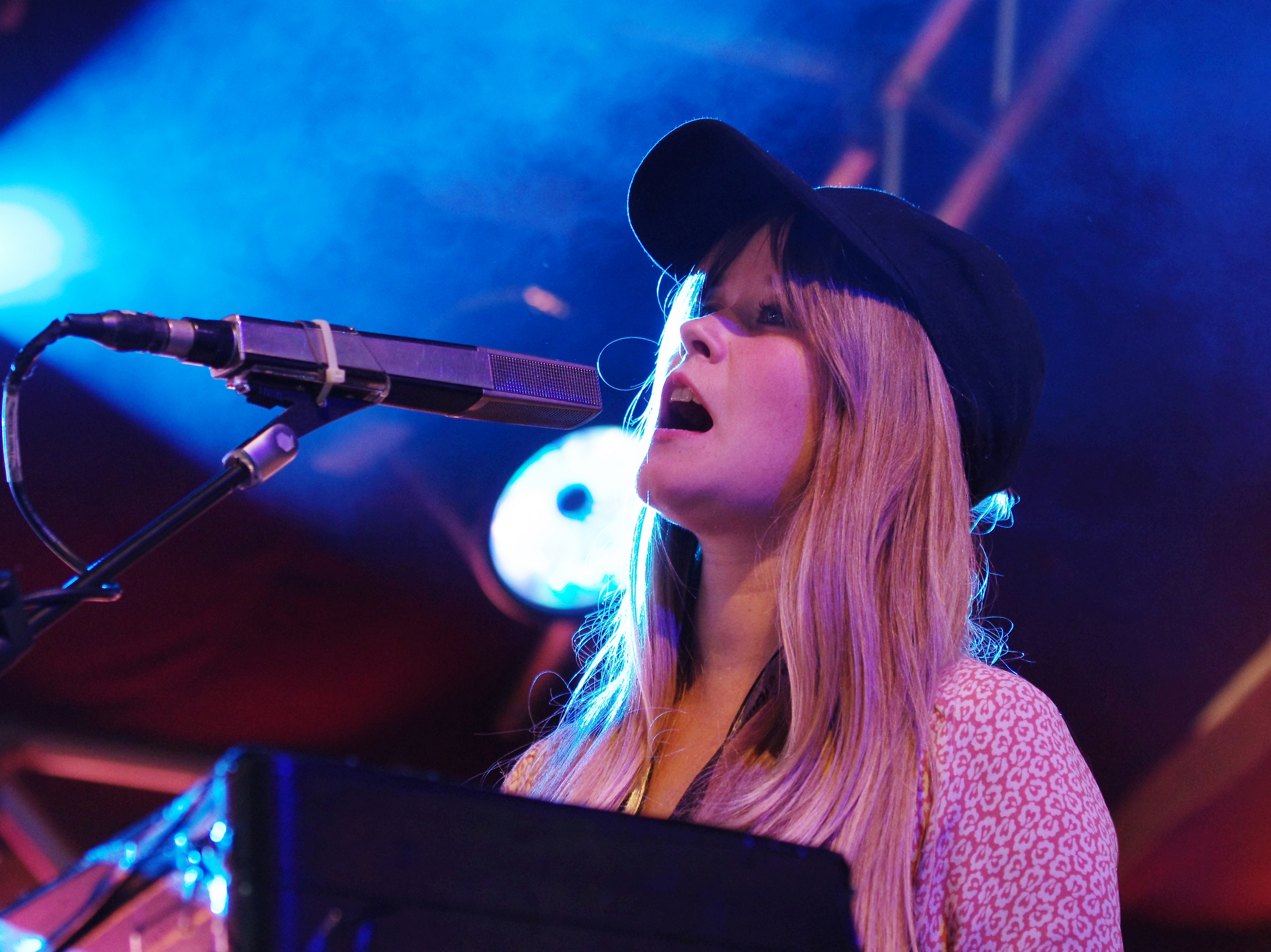
Von Hausswolff performing at Haldern Pop in 2013

Ceremony was released only in Sweden by Kning Disk on 18 July 2012. The album was re-released on 14 June 2013 in Europe by City Slang and on 9 July 2013 in North America by Other Music Recording Co. The album's artwork features a close-up of organ pipes, reflecting on the use of that instrument in the music.

To promote Ceremony, Anna von Hausswolff made several live performances. Her performance of "Mountains Crave" premiered through Stereogum's website on 16 May 2013. She later played "Funeral for My Future Children" with percussionist Michael Stasiak at Christ Church United Methodist, New York City. American radio network NPR published the performance on 4 September 2013.

=== Singles ===
Two singles were released in support of Ceremony. The album's lead single, "Mountains Crave", was released on 28 June 2012. The song's music video, directed by Anders Nydam, was released on 18 June 2012. "Funeral for My Future Children" arrived to the United Kingdom as the second and final single on 23 September 2013.

Though not promoted as official singles, three songs from the album received music videos. The video clips for the songs "Epitaph of Theodor" and "Epitaph of Daniel" were released on 31 August 2012 and 21 December 2012, respectively; both of them were directed by Maria von Hausswolff, the singer's sister. "Deathbed" was issued as a promotional single following the announcement of the album's re-release. Maria directed its accompanying music video, and it features von Hausswolff's siblings.

== Reception ==
Professional ratings
Aggregate scores
Source	Rating
AnyDecentMusic?	7.1/10
Metacritic	77/100
Review scores
Source	Rating
The 405	7/10
AllMusic	3.5/5 stars
Filter	83%
GIGsoup	5/5 stars
The Line of Best Fit	7.5/10
Mojo	4/5 stars
MusicOMH	4/5 stars
The Skinny	4/5 stars
Uncut	3.5/5 stars

Ceremony received generally positive reviews from music critics. At Metacritic, which assigns a normalized rating out of 100 to reviews from mainstream publications, the album received an average score of 77, based on seven reviews. Paul Smith from GIGsoup gave the album a perfect score, commenting that the inclusion of the church organ "gives a ghostly feel and compliments the vocals perfectly." Peter Margasak of the Chicago Reader stated that despite not "entirely ditch[ing] th[e pop] template" from Singing from the Grave, Ceremony "radically altered the complexion of [von Hausswolff's] music, giving it a severe intensity and sense of grandeur." Similarly, Nothing but Hope and Passion magazine's Henning Grabow agreed that the album "is clearly still pop music, yet it is of an unlimited, profound and ambitious sort" and that "it's just music that's passionately digging in the peripheries where, naturally, a lot of darkness is to be found."

Calling Ceremony "a rare, thoughtful, inspiring record", Bob Boilen from NPR found that "von Hausswolff's voice possesses the power to soar with those mighty pipes and still hold tight to delicate, personal emotions." Nevertheless, a more mixed review came from The New York Times's Ben Ratliff, who thought that her voice "isn't quite as big as she wants it to be, and her own instrumental writing is simple and limited", further adding that "the record is awkward and seriously pretentious at times, but you can't miss the heat of its ambition." Ceremony was nominated for two Swedish Grammis and a Nordic Music Prize nomination. Upon its initial release, Ceremony entered Sweden's Sverigetopplistan chart at number five. Following the announcement of its 2013 re-release, the record reached number 58 in that country.

=== Popular usage ===
"Mountains Crave" was featured in the eighth episode of the HBO series The Sex Lives of College Girls in 2021.

== Track listing ==
All tracks are written by Anna von Hausswolff, except "No Body", written by Daniel Ögren. All tracks are produced by Filip Leyman.

Ceremony track listing
No.	Title	Length
1.	"Epitaph of Theodor"	5:25
2.	"Deathbed"	8:38
3.	"Mountains Crave"	3:35
4.	"Goodbye"	6:16
5.	"Red Sun"	3:17
6.	"Epitaph of Daniel"	3:10
7.	"No Body"	2:33
8.	"Liturgy of Light"	5:01
9.	"Harmonica"	4:22
10.	"Ocean"	5:44
11.	"Sova"	3:24
12.	"Funeral for My Future Children"	4:42
13.	"Sun Rise"	4:52
Total length:		60:59

== Personnel ==
Credits adapted from the liner notes of Ceremony.

Musicians

- Anna von Hausswolff – vocals, pipe organ, piano, synthesizer
- Maria von Hausswolff – vocals (8–10, 13)
- Xenia Krissin – vocals (10, 12), zither
- Filip Leyman – synthesizer, percussion
- Karl Vento – guitar
- Joel Fabiansson – guitar
- Daniel Ögren – guitar, clavioline
- Christopher Cantillo – drums

Technical

- Filip Leyman – production, recording, mixing
- Philip Granqvist – mastering

Artwork

- Anders Nydam – photography
- Mattias Nilsson – design

== Charts ==
Chart performance for Ceremony
Chart (2012–2020)	Peak position
Swedish Albums (Sverigetopplistan)	5
UK Record Store Albums (OCC)	18

== Release history ==
Release dates and formats for Ceremony
Region	Date	Format(s)	Label	Ref.
Sweden	18 July 2012	Digital download	Kning Disk	
Sweden	23 July 2012	LP	Kning Disk	
Europe	14 June 2013	Digital download	City Slang	
United States	9 July 2013	Digital download; LP	Other Music Recording Co.	
