= Iconoclasts (album) =

Studio album by Anna von Hausswolff
- Released: 31 October 2025
- Studios: Leyman Studio; Svenska Grammofonstudion; Candy Bomber (Berlin); Annedal Church; Örgryte New Church; Vinberg Church
- Length: 72:49
- Label: Year0001
- Producers: Anna von Hausswolff; Filip Leyman

Anna von Hausswolff chronology
Live at Montreaux Jazz Festival (2022)	Iconoclasts (2025)

Singles from Iconoclasts
- 1. "Stardust / The Whole Woman" Released: 21 August 2025; 2. "Facing Atlas" Released: 18 September 2025; 3. "Struggle with the Beast" Released: 16 October 2025; 4. "Aging Young Women" Released: 28 October 2025

Iconoclasts is the sixth studio album by Swedish musician Anna von Hausswolff, released on 31 October 2025 by Year0001. It was produced alongside longtime collaborator Filip Leyman.

Featuring guest appearances from Iggy Pop and Ethel Cain, the album was released to universal critical acclaim.

== Background ==
Von Hausswolff began performing material from the album live in 2024 as Atlas Song, a performance which features the live music alongside a dance performance. It is a collaboration with Dutch choreographer/director duo Imre and Marne van Opstal and the Gothenburg Opera Dance Company. Von Hausswolff said that "all the music was ready before the show, and the whole thing, from the scenography to the dance, was built up from that."

She said that rapper Kendrick Lamar may have been the most important influence for Iconoclasts, "even if you can't hear it in the music" because "he's one of those artists who's so good at not dwelling in the darkness but rising above it, putting a spotlight on problems and openly encouraging change." She also named Chelsea Wolfe, Pharmakon, and Emma Ruth Rundle as influences for being "female artists who use dark aesthetics but aren't afraid to balance that darkness with a little bit of light."

== Artwork ==
The artwork for Iconoclasts and its singles were designed by Berlin artist Lotta Antonsson, who took childhood photographs of Von Hausswolff and made collages using seashells that cover her eyes and teeth.

== Release ==
The album was first announced on 21 August 2025 alongside a double single, "Stardust" and "The Whole Woman"; the latter featuring American musician Iggy Pop. The album also contains features from American artist Ethel Cain as well as Abul Mogard and the musician's sister, Maria von Hausswolff.

"Facing Atlas" was released as the album's second single on 18 September. She described it as a song "about the risks of commitment – to be bound to something until you no longer feel control over yourself and your direction in life. A destiny can feel like a prison if it’s not chosen by heart’s desire."

Third single "Struggle with the Beast" was released on 16 October. The song was inspired by a friend's bout of psychosis. "There was something unstoppable and completely disconnected about her, as if she were living and reigning in a parallel universe of some kind. She was so far away from the person I knew, as if all of her social barriers had completely dissolved. There was a new, weird brilliance to her way of communicating and being. She had no filters," von Hausswolff said.

The fourth and final single, "Aging Young Women", featuring Ethel Cain, was released on 28 October, three days before the album. Maria von Hausswolff introduced her sister to Cain's music, and later the two connected via Instagram. About the song, von Hausswolff said: "I wrote it in a state of confusion and frustration of not being sure about wanting to build a family of my own. Can I settle with the idea of not having kids?"

== Reception ==
Professional ratings
Aggregate scores
Source	Rating
Metacritic	88/100
Review scores
Source	Rating
AllMusic	4.5/5 stars
Clash	9/10
The Guardian	5/5 stars
Mojo	4/5 stars
Paste	8.7/10
Pitchfork	7.6/10
Slant Magazine	4/5 stars
Sputnikmusic	4.8/5

Iconoclasts was acclaimed by music critics upon release. At Metacritic, which assigns a normalized rating out of 100 from mainstream critics, the album has an average of 88 from 13 reviews, which indicates "universal acclaim".

== Track listing ==
All tracks are written by Anna von Hausswolff with extra contributions where noted.

No.	Title	Writer(s)	Length
1.	"The Beast"	von Hausswolff, Otis Sandsjö	3:11
2.	"Facing Atlas"		4:53
3.	"The Iconoclast"		11:14
4.	"The Whole Woman" (with Iggy Pop)		4:18
5.	"The Mouth"	von Hausswolff, Otis Sandsjö, Filip Leyman, David Sabel	7:12
6.	"Stardust"		6:46
7.	"Aging Young Women" (with Ethel Cain)		4:01
8.	"Consensual Neglect"	von Hausswolff, Otis Sandsjö, Filip Leyman	4:57
9.	"Struggle with the Beast"	von Hausswolff, Otis Sandsjö, Filip Leyman, David Sabel	8:44
10.	"An Ocean of Time" (with Abul Mogard)	von Hausswolff, Abul Mogard	7:57
11.	"Unconditional Love" (with Maria von Hausswolff)		7:01
12.	"Rising Legends"		2:35
Total length:			72:49

== Personnel ==
Credits adapted from Year0001.

- Anna von Hausswolff – production (all tracks), vocals (tracks 2–7, 9–11), church organ (tracks 1–9, 11, 12), guitar (tracks 6, 9), string arrangements (track 9), woodwind arrangements (tracks 1, 3, 5, 7, 8, 11)
- Filip Leyman – production, engineering (all tracks); synthesizer (tracks 1–9, 11, 12); drums, percussion (tracks 2–5, 7, 9, 11); guitar (tracks 3, 4, 9), mixing (tracks 1, 12)
- Iggy Pop – vocals (track 4)
- Ethel Cain – vocals (track 7)
- Maria von Hausswolff – vocals (track 11)
- Otis Sandsjö – saxophone (tracks 1–3, 5–9, 11), clarinet (tracks 3, 5, 7, 9, 11), woodwind arrangements (tracks 1, 3, 5, 8)
- Joel Fabiansson – guitar (tracks 2, 3, 5, 6, 9)
- Karl Vento – acoustic guitar (track 4)
- David Sabel – bass (tracks 2, 3, 5, 6, 9)
- Love Meyerson – drums (tracks 3, 6)
- Sven Johansson – mixing (tracks 1–9, 11)
- Abul Mogard – electronics, mixing (track 10)
- Jenny Jonsson – violin (tracks 3, 5, 7, 9, 11)
- Alexander Chojecki – violin (tracks 3, 5, 7, 9, 11)
- Annie Svedund – violin (tracks 3, 5, 7, 9, 11)
- Charlotta Grahn-Wetter – violin (tracks 3, 5, 7, 9, 11)
- Märta Eriksson – viola (tracks 3, 5, 7, 9, 11)
- Lisa Reuter – cello (tracks 3, 5, 7, 9, 11)
- Viktor Reuter – double bass (tracks 3, 5, 7, 9, 11)
- Samuel Runsteen – strings, string arrangement (track 4)
- Martin Schaub – string arrangements (tracks 3, 5, 7, 9, 11)
- Oskar Lindberg – engineering
- Ingo Krauss – engineering
- Magnus Lindberg – mastering
- André Jofré – creative direction
- Victor Svedberg – art direction
- Evalena von Hausswolf – photography
- Lotta Antonsson – artwork

== Charts ==
Chart performance for Iconoclasts
Chart (2025)	Peak position
Scottish Albums (Official Charts)	64
Swedish Albums (Sverigetopplistan)	33
UK Albums Sales (OCC)	41
UK Independent Albums (Official Charts)	16
