= Lunden, Örgryte =

Urban district in Gothenburg, Sweden

Coordinates: 57.71080°N 12.01297°E

Water tower in Lunden, Gothenburg

Landshövdingehus in Lunden, Gothenburg

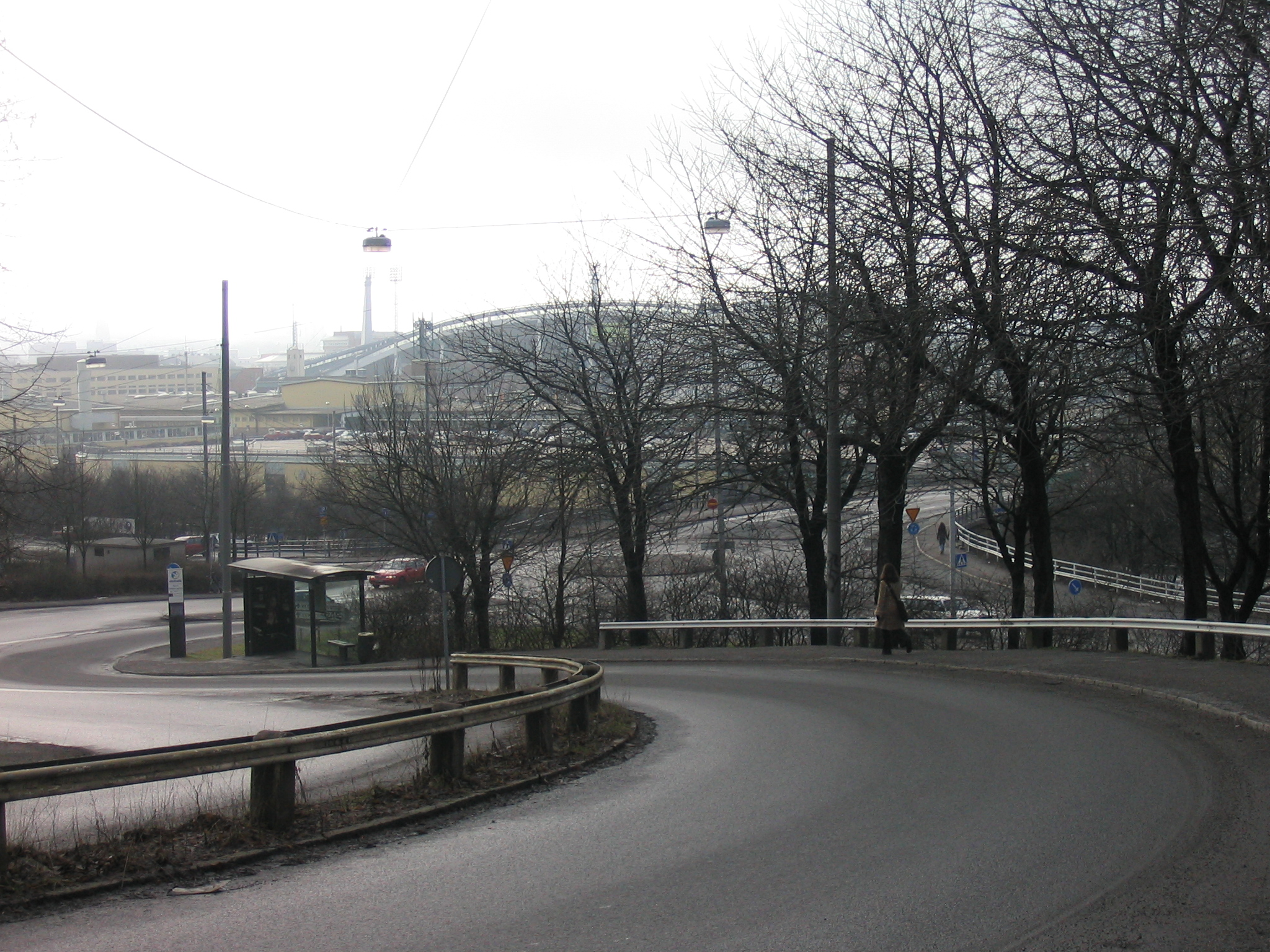
Road from Lunden down to central Gothenburg

Lunden is one of 8 districts in Örgryte borough, Gothenburg, Sweden.

Lunden is situated immediately to the east of the central area of Gothenburg. Lunden has 10206 inhabitants (2005).

== History ==
In the beginning, many of the buildings were smaller family houses, but were later replaced by larger apartment buildings, mostly of the Landshövdingehus type, in the 1920s and 1930s.

== Geography ==
Lunden is located in Örgryte borough, which contains 7 more distinct:

- Bagaregården
- Kärralund
- Kallebäck
- Olskroken
- Redbergslid
- Skår
- Överås
