= Kallebäck =

Area of Gothenburg, Sweden

Coordinates: 57°41′0″N 12°0′35″E

Kallebäck is one of 8 districts in Örgryte borough, Gothenburg, Sweden.

The name Kallebäck means "The brook with the cauldron" and the name dates back to 1496.

The buildings in Kallebäck mostly consists of apartment buildings built between 1960 and 1970. The buildings in the north part of Kallebäck are generally lower, with only 3-4 floors. The buildings nearer to the highway E6 are higher: 12 floors. As part of Bostad2021, 1800 apartments are being built, with move in dates ranging from 2021 to 2027, along Smörgatan. The area also has a 14 stories high building, named Ostkupan ("The cheese cover") with about 360 students, and its own pub in the basement.

== History ==
- On November 28, 2004, there was a shootout at Mejerigatan 2, just outside Ostkupan when car thieves were charged by the police. One officer was wounded and had to be taken to the university hospital in Gothenburg before the thieves were arrested. They were later charged with attempted murder.

== Geography ==
Kallebäck is located in Örgryte borough, which contains 7 more districts:

- Bagaregården
- Kärralund
- Lunden
- Olskroken
- Redbergslid
- Skår
- Överås
