= All Thoughts Fly =

Studio album by Anna von Hausswolff
- Released: 25 September 2020
- Recorded: January 2020
- Studios: Örgryte New Church, Gothenburg
- Length: 43:31
- Label: Southern Lord
- Producers: Anna von Hausswolff; Filip Leyman

Anna von Hausswolff chronology
Dead Magic (2018)	All Thoughts Fly (2020)	Live at Montreux Jazz Festival (2022)

Singles from All Thoughts Fly
- 1. "Sacro Bosco" Released: 28 July 2020; 2. "All Thoughts Fly" Released: 14 August 2020

All Thoughts Fly is the fifth studio album by Swedish musician Anna von Hausswolff, released on 25 September 2020 by Southern Lord Records. The album consists of seven pipe organ pieces composed and played by von Hausswolff, who also produced the album with Filip Leyman. It received a positive reception from critics and placed on multiple year-end lists.

== Background and release ==
The album was announced on 28 July 2020, along with the release of its lead single, "Sacro Bosco", and a music video directed by Gustaf and Ludvig Holtenäs. The second single, the title track, was released on 14 August. The album was released on 25 September, as von Hausswolff's first release with Southern Lord. A video for "Dolore di Orsini" was released on 6 December, directed by the Holtenäses with animation effects by Mathias Söderberg.

The album cover features von Hausswolff stood inside the mouth of the Orsini Hell Mouth statue at the Gardens of Bomarzo. Von Hausswolff recorded the album on a pipe organ in Gothenburg's Örgryte New Church in January 2020.

== Reception ==
All Thoughts Fly ratings
Aggregate scores
Source	Rating
Metacritic	80/100
Review scores
Source	Rating
AllMusic	4/5 stars
Metal Hammer	3.5/5 stars
MusicOMH	4/5 stars
Pitchfork	7.7/10
Record Collector	4/5 stars
Spectrum Culture	85%
Under the Radar	7/10

According to the review aggregator Metacritic, All Thoughts Fly received "generally favorable reviews" based on a weighted average score of 80 out of 100 from 6 critic scores.

=== Year-end lists ===
All Thoughts Fly year-end lists
Publication	#	Ref.
Deluxe	70	
Louder Than War	30	
The Wire	43	

== Track listing ==
All tracks are written by Anna von Hausswolff.

All Thoughts Fly track listing
No.	Title	Length
1.	"Theatre of Nature"	6:00
2.	"Dolore di Orsini"	4:04
3.	"Sacro Bosco"	6:23
4.	"Persefone"	7:08
5.	"Entering"	2:10
6.	"All Thoughts Fly"	12:23
7.	"Outside the Gate (For Bruna)"	5:23
Total length:		43:31

== Personnel ==
- Anna von Hausswolff - pipe organ, producer, mixing engineer, sound design
- Filip Leyman - producer, mixing engineer, sound designer
- Hans Olsson - mastering engineer
- Gianluca Grasselli - cover photo
- Tina Damgaard - album layout and design
