= Majorna =

Urban district in Gothenburg, Sweden

Coordinates: 57°41′36″N 11°55′25″E

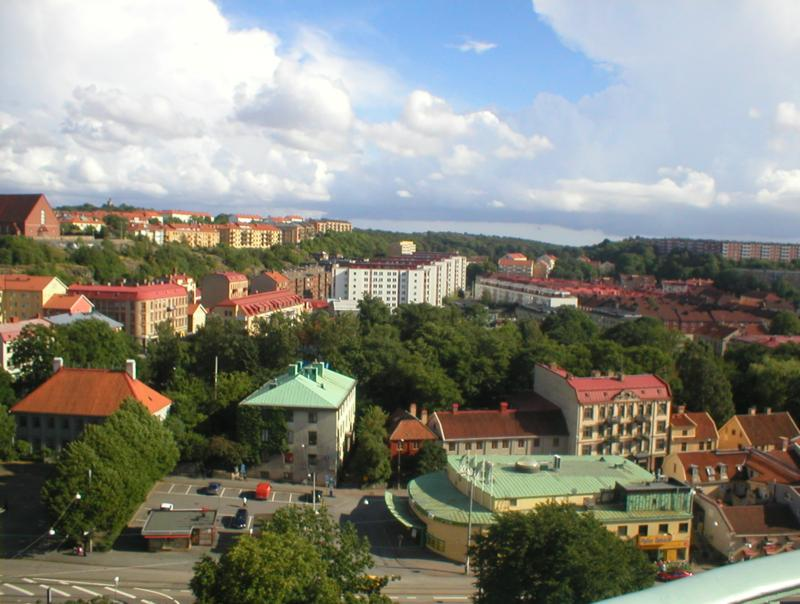
Majorna, Stigbergstorget

Majorna is a residential area in Gothenburg, Sweden. It is a part of the borough Majorna-Linné. It is located west of the city just outside the city centre, with Göta älv in the north, Masthugget and Slottsskogen in the east, Högsbo in the south and Älvsborg in the west.

== History ==
Majorna is an old area, originating from the times of the Älvsborg fortress before the foundation of Gothenburg in 1621. After the foundation of the city of Gothenburg, Majorna housed wharfs and other harbour-related business. It became a part of the city in 1868, prior to this it had been owned by the city's police authority, but it belonged to Örgryte parish. After including Majorna in Gothenburg, the population of the city exceeded 50,000.

In the beginning of the 1900s, Majorna got its first tram line. It went over a hill known as Stigbergsliden, continued along Karl Johansgatan, all the way to the end station at Slottskogsgatan. This meant that the population of Majorna became less isolated, they could now take the tram to work in the factories in Gamlestaden, and later at SKF.

== Architecture ==
The buildings significant to Majorna are the three storey buildings where the first storey is built in stone and the topmost two are built of wood, called Landshövdingehus. They were frequently built in Gothenburg during the late 1800s and early 1900s. In Majorna they represent a flat, urban neighborhood, with tree lined avenues, courtyards, small shops in the ground floor of the buildings, and details that testify of the fine craftsmanship put into the bay windows, brick arches and the forged steel railings. A large number of the buildings still remains, but in some areas they have been replaced by newer constructions. The upper parts of the hills in Gothenburg were not built-up, with the exception for some shacks, until the mid 20th century; there are mostly buildings from the 1960s and 1970s, some of them in a Functionalistic style.

== Population ==
Majorna has traditionally been a typical working class area, with a population of industrial workers and dockers. According to Agnes Arpi, the area still has a strong working-class identity. She claims that the working class heritage has characterized how the people living in Majorna see themselves, and that people considering themselves as radical and politically aware with an Alternative lifestyle, has moved there over the years because of this. This statement is supported by the results in the 2010 Swedish election. In the electoral area of Mariaplan (1 of the 13 in Majorna) 25.3 percent of the votes went to the Green Party, 23.9 to the Left Party and 18.6 to the Social Democratic Party. The Moderate Party only received 15.1 percent of the votes (compared to the country average of 30.1). The numbers are more or less the same in the whole of Majorna.

Majorna is one of the areas of Gothenburg that has been described as undergoing gentrification, at least symbolically.
