= Landshövdingehus =

Building in Gothenburg Municipality, Gothenburg and Bohus County, Sweden

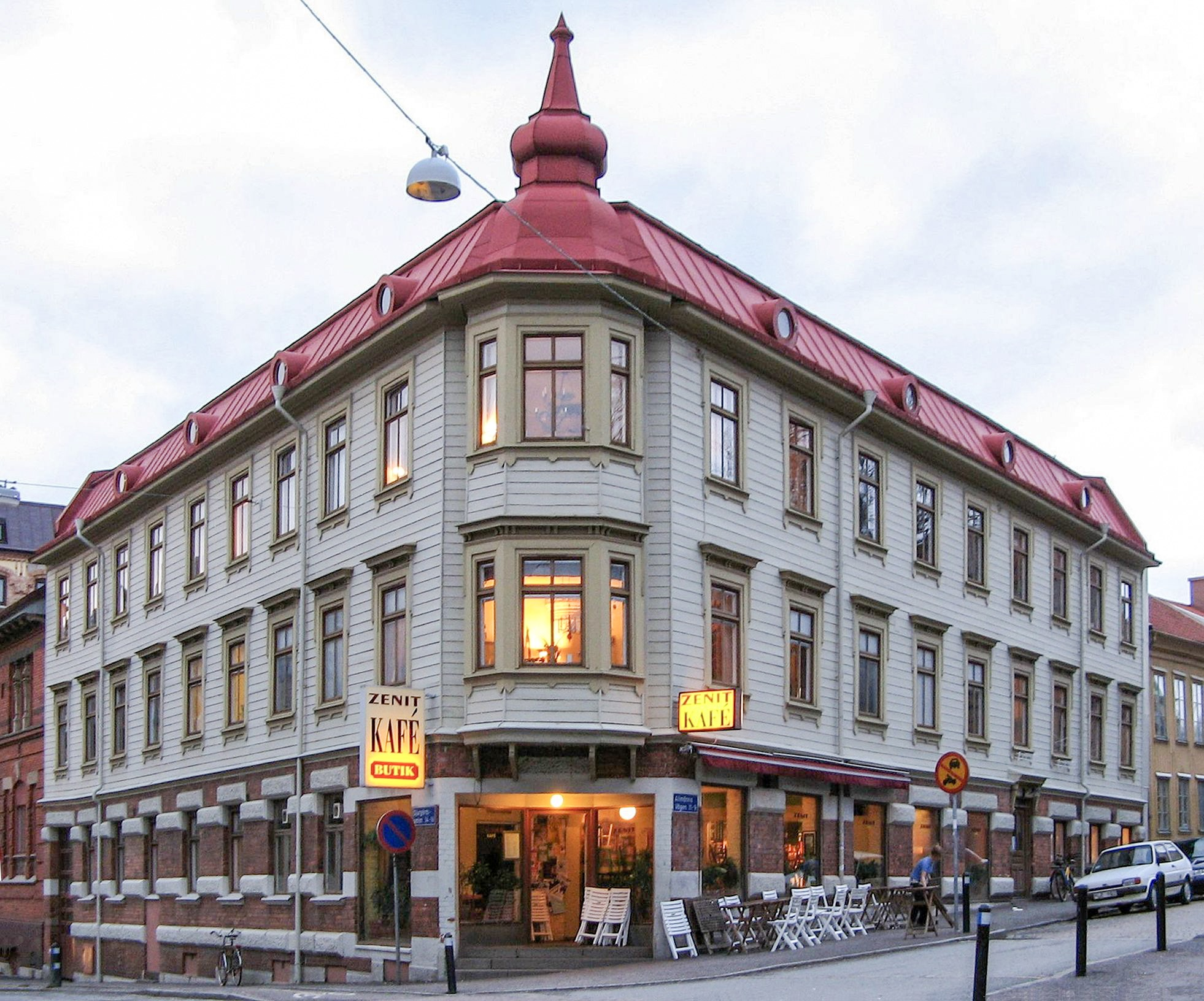
This landshövdingehus at Allmänna vägen 11 in Majorna was built in 1894. The original detailing is largely intact, although the windows were exchanged during a renovation in 1982. It is more luxurious than normal because of the corner placement. The building features corner towers with tower spires and bay windows. The ground floor was originally used by a department store, but is now occupied by a café.

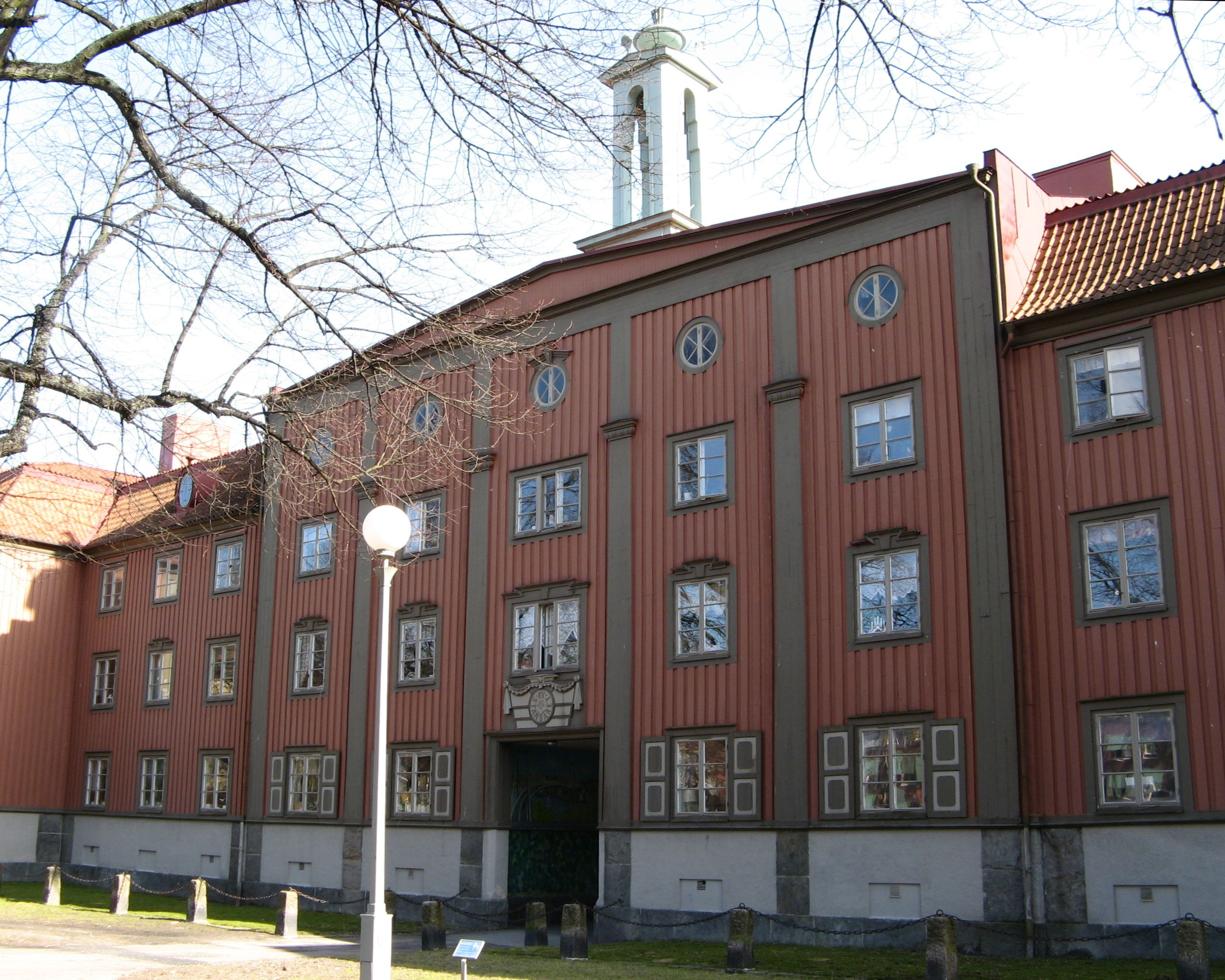
Kvarteret Standaret, designed by Arvid Fuhre, built in 1922–1923 at Karl Johans torg is a classic example of national romanticism in the form of a landshövdingehus. The buildings are arranged around a central axis. Note the relation between the materials – the wooden panel covering the stone base and the distinct vertical elements.Arvid Fuhre was also the main architect of the buildings in Gothenburg 300 Years foundation Jubilee exhibition 1923 at the Liseberg, today an amusement park. The design and colour scheme of Standaret and Liseberg have great similarities. Standaret is now protected as a building of cultural significance by the city of Gothenburg.

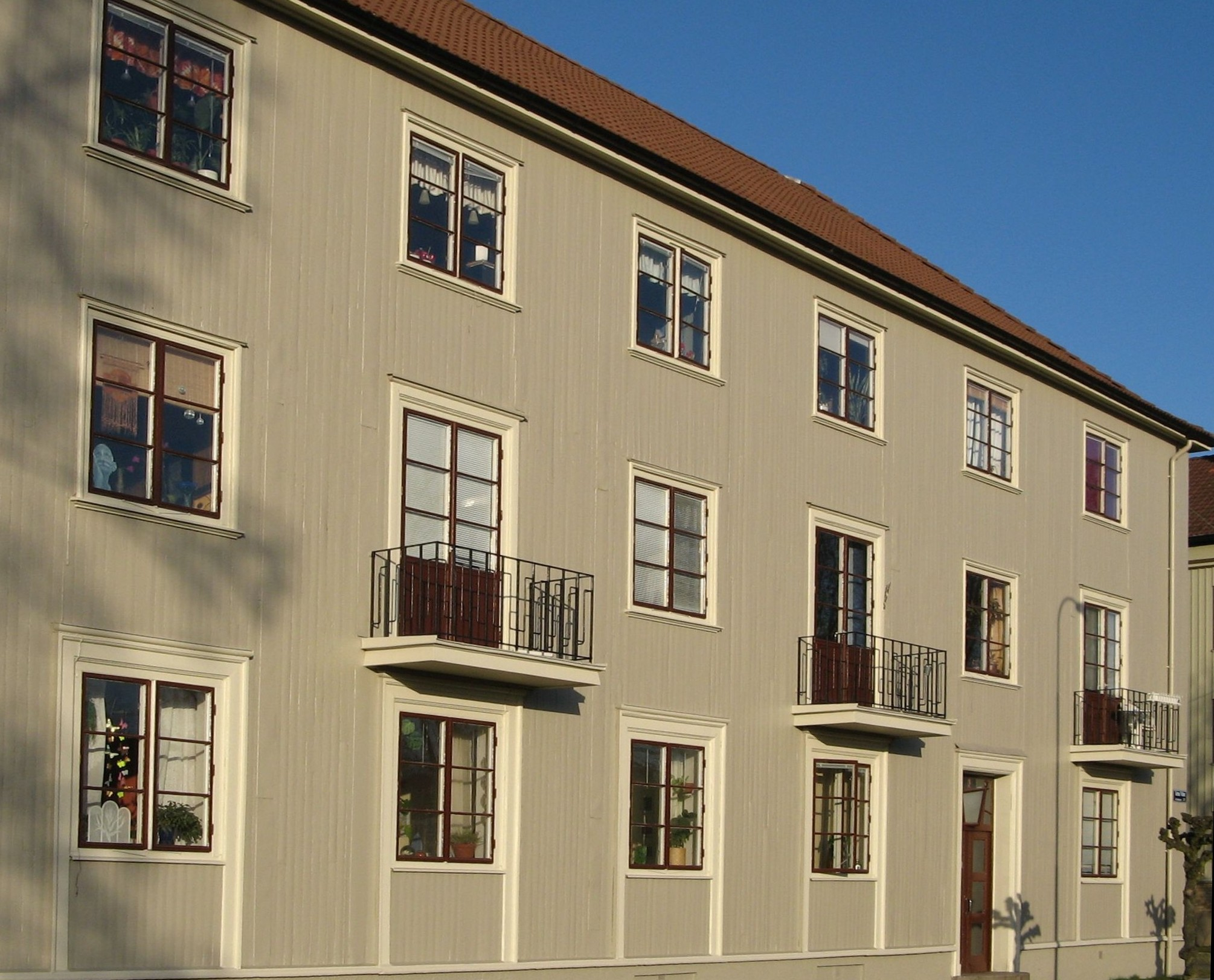
Kvarteret Maskrosen, built 1928–1934 at Gröna vallen, is characteristic of Kungsladugård. The building is in a classical style, with vertical smooth wooden board (i.e. without strips) and a small yard facing the street.

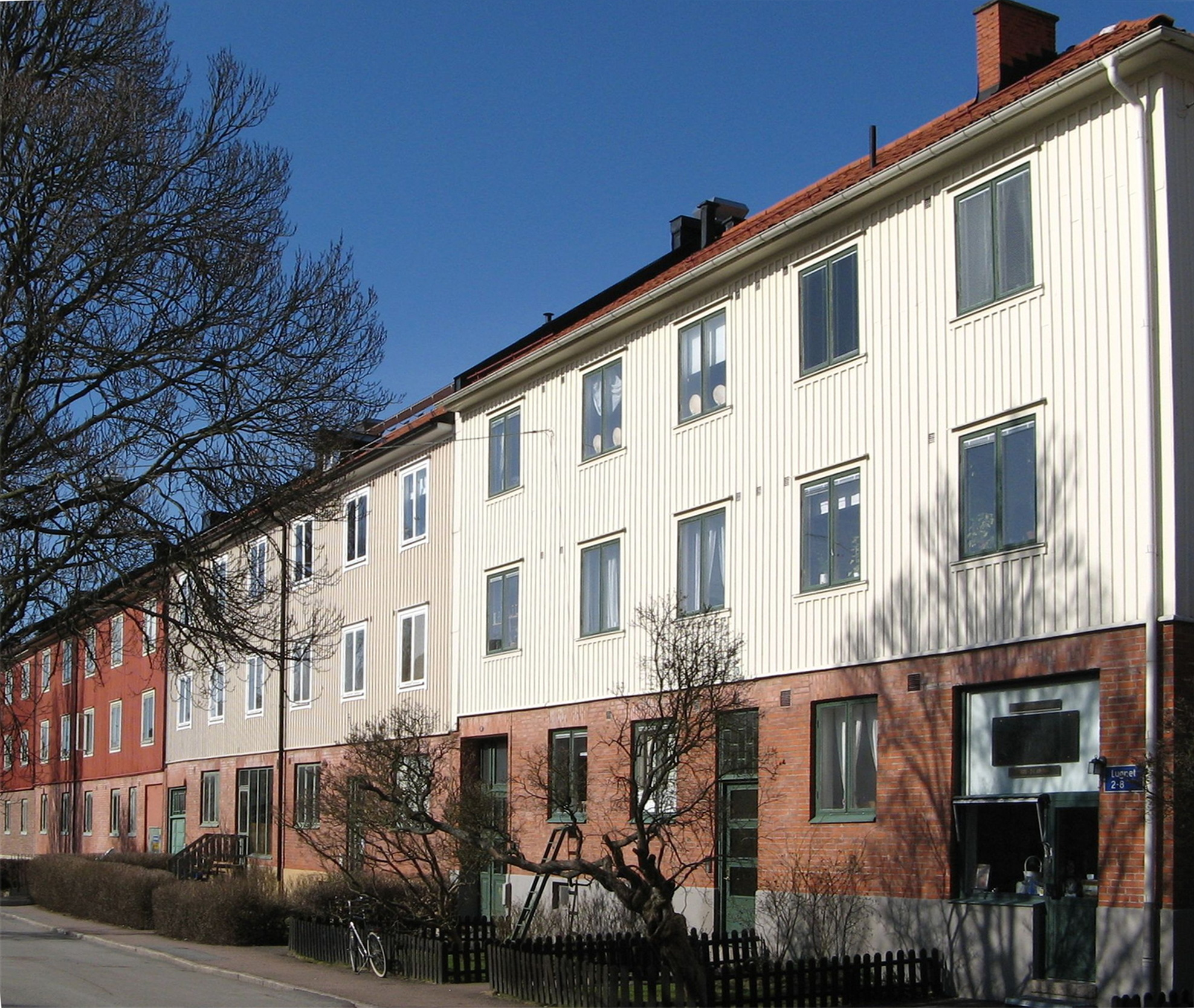
Kvarteret Åkermyntan at Lugnet is built in functionalist style 1931–1934. Typical of this type of landshövdingehus is the austere façade totally without decoration, in contrast to earlier styles. The wooden panel is nailed vertically to give the wall a flatter look. Other details also contribute to an even surface: a brick wall without any decoration and a diminutive strip in the splice between brick and wood.

The landshövdingehus (Swedish: [ˈlândsˌhœvdɪŋɛˌhʉːs]; English: "governor house") is a type of building unique to Gothenburg, Sweden. City bylaws in the 19th century ruled that houses made of wood could be a maximum of two storeys high in order to protect against fires. However, one building association tried to circumvent the rule and submitted drawings for a building with the ground storey made of brick and two upper storeys made of wood. The city building council did not accept the application, but the county government overruled them and the landshövdingehus was born.

== Overview ==
The very first landshövdingehus was built 1875 in the district of Annedal, and was demolished in the redevelopment of the 1970s, but many other examples of these buildings remain today.

A characteristic of all landshövdingehus is the combination of one brick storey and two wooden storeys. Most landshövdingehus were built for the working class. The apartments generally had a kitchen and one living room. Up to 15 people could live in one apartment of this kind, due to the extreme shortage of housing at the time. The apartments usually provide a floorplan with light from two directions: a window in the kitchen orientated towards an inner courtyard, and a window in the living room facing the street. Independent builders constructed the buildings, sometimes using architect drawings. Different owners could separate a courtyard into parcels divided by fences. Nowadays, most areas in the districts of Majorna and Kungsladugård are owned by a single entity (the municipal housing company Familjebostäder) but this separation can still be seen in some courtyards. In Kungsladugård, the city plan by Albert Lilienberg and the original variation in ownership have given a building structure that balances variation and context in an elegant way.

Because of the comparatively long building period (1875–1950) of the landshövdingehus, they show an interesting variation in style. The districts of Majorna and Kungsladugård were saved from demolition in the 1960s due to protests. Both districts now have large, contiguous areas of houses that explore styles from an almost complete representation of the period, except the very earliest period of building. In the district of Lunden, there are renovated blocks of landshövdingehus from the period 1920–1935 that have retained their original style.

The first landshövdingehus in Annedal, built 1875, and others built in the period between 1875 and 1880 had a strictly classical style with limited decoration. The landshövdingehus built around 1880–1890 attempted to imitate the more high-status stone houses. They used horizontal board panelling and rich profiling. They were often decorated with bay or dormer windows, corner towers, and/or rustication of the brick wall.

During the Art Nouveau period of the 1920s, the colour of the houses changed to darker (often reddish brown) nuances. The façades were more elaborately detailed with balconies and portals. The Functionalist period of the 1930s also influenced the style of the landshövdingehus. The façades were cleansed of decoration and the wooden panelling was nailed vertically, with the brick ground floor being plastered smooth. The 1940s saw the end of the landshövdingehus era with a new decree from the authorities, as new landshövdingehus were forbidden as a fire precaution in case of war.

== Locations ==
There are landshövdingehus in the following districts of Gothenburg:

- Almedal
- Annedal
- Bagaregården
- Brämaregården
- Färjestaden
- Gamlestaden
- Gårda
- Haga
- Krokslätt
- Kungsladugård
- Kyrkbyn
- Kålltorp
- Landala
- Lindholmen
- Lunden
- Majorna
- Olivedal
- Olskroken
- Rambergsstaden
- Redbergslid
- Sannegården
- Stigberget
- Vasastaden
