= The Miraculous =

Studio album by Anna von Hausswolff
- Released: 13 November 2015
- Studios: Studio Acusticum (Piteå, Sweden); Filip Leyman's studio (Gothenburg)
- Genres: Gothic; folk metal; neoclassical; art pop; drone metal; post-rock
- Length: 49:26
- Labels: Pomperipossa; City Slang; Other Music
- Producer: Filip Leyman

Anna von Hausswolff chronology
Ceremony (2012)	The Miraculous (2015)	Dead Magic (2018)

Singles from The Miraculous
- 1. "Come Wander With Me / Deliverance" Released: 19 August 2015; 2. "Evocation" Released: 9 October 2015; 3. "An Oath" Released: 4 November 2015

The Miraculous is the third studio album by Swedish musician Anna von Hausswolff. It was released on 13 November 2015 by her own label Pomperipossa Records. As in her previous album Ceremony (2012), The Miraculous contains a pipe organ, which was recorded at the Studio Acusticum concert hall in the Swedish city of Piteå. When writing the album, Von Hausswolff took inspiration from a place where her family used to tell her stories as a child, and the book Källan by Swedish writer Walter Ljungquist.

The Miraculous marks a departure from the gothic pop-led music of the singer's previous works, exploring genres like folk metal, post-rock, and neoclassical music. Music critics praised the album, and it debuted at number eight in Sweden. The Miraculous was supported by three singles, all of which but the third one received a music video: "Come Wander With Me / Deliverance", "Evocation", and "An Oath".

== Background and recording ==
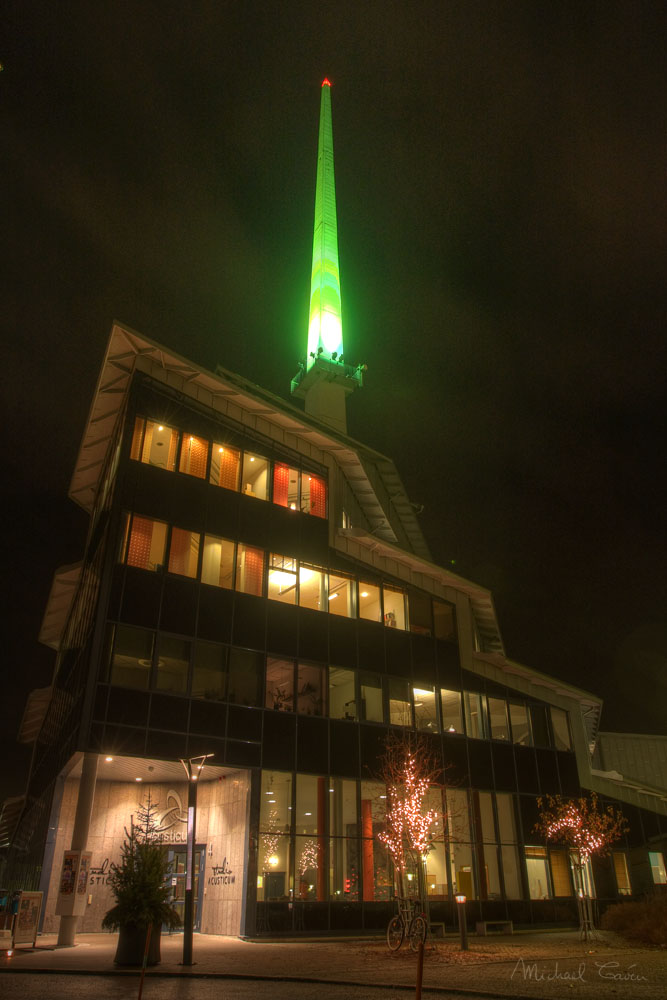
The pipe organ from The Miraculous was recorded at the Studio Acusticum concert hall in Piteå, Sweden.

The Miraculous takes its title from the name von Hausswolff gave to a then-undisclosed village in Sweden that she visited with her family since her childhood. A place of "mystery, magic, and terror" for her, the singer's parents used to tell her tales about Swedish folklore there. Historically, a 1542 uprising against the rule of Gustav I happened in that location, in which peasants from Småland protested the heavy taxes imposed by the king but ended defeated. Von Hausswolff compared the landscape and history of "the miraculous" place to the setting and plot of the 1985 film Come and See.

Visiting the place in her adulthood boasted von Hausswolff's creativity and prompted her to create her own stories. Years later, she revealed that the name of the place that inspired The Miraculous is Kisa, which is located in the Östergötland County, Sweden. The album was also inspired by her instrumental recording Källan performed at the Lincoln Cathedral, which was named after the 1961 book by Walter Ljungquist. Read by von Hausswolff when she was touring in 2013, she describes the book to be "about curiosity and the possibility that there is something more to this world than what you currently know." After reading the book and watching the film, she thought of composing an album with a new soundscape for her but similar to the structure of Källan. Even though they are related, von Hausswolff clarified that The Miraculous and Källan are two different projects.

Von Hausswolff recorded The Miraculous with her backing band and producer Filip Leyman at the Studio Acusticum concert hall located in Piteå, Sweden. This hall houses a nine thousand-pipe organ built by Gerald Woehl, which is one of the largest in Europe. She decided to record the album in the hall because she was interested in playing its organ after she declined a request to perform there in 2013. Another recording location was Leyman's studio in Gothenburg, which was also the place where the album was mixed. A friend of Von Hausswolff presented the song "Come Wander With Me", written by Jeff Alexander and Anthony Wilson, to her and became one of her favorite compositions. After she began to cover the song during live performances, "it grew bigger and bigger and another song [titled 'Deliverance'] started to take shape," turning into the album track "Come Wander With Me / Deliverance".

== Music and lyrics ==
Musically, The Miraculous is a gothic, folk metal, neoclassical, art pop, drone metal, and post-rock album. With the Acusticum pipe organ, von Hausswolff sought to create an experimental work, marking a musical departure from the gothic pop sounds of von Hausswolff's previous efforts. The singer is accompanied by her backing band, which consists of Leyman on synthesizers, drummer Ulrik Ording, and guitarists Joel Fabiansson and Karl Vento. The Acusticum pipe organ incorporates several instruments like glockenspiel, vibraphone, celeste, percussion, and pipes partially submerged in water that cause high-pitched shrieking sounds. John Freeman of The Quietus described it as "a huge, brooding record that fuses ethereal fantasy with the portentous drama of rumbling organ drone." Von Hausswolff's flexible and acrobatic vocals shift from alto to soprano though they are used sparingly throughout The Miraculous. Even though the lyrical content in the album stands between fantasy and reality, she stated the lyrics were different to storytelling, describing them as fragmented and abstract.

== Release and promotion ==
The Miraculous was released on 13 November 2015 by von Hausswolff's record label Pomperipossa Records in Scandinavia; City Slang and Other Music released it the same day in North America and the rest of Europe, respectively. Nevertheless, British magazine Fact had the album available for streaming on 6 November 2015. The album's lead single, "Come Wander With Me / Deliverance" was released on 19 August 2015. The accompanying music video was released on 28 September 2016, one year after the single's release.

"Evocation" was released as the album's second single along with its music video on 13 October 2015. The third and final single "An Oath" arrived on 29 October 2015. Von Hausswolff and guitarist Vento recorded a live session for "Stranger", which was uploaded to the singer's YouTube channel on 2 December 2015. To promote the album, von Hausswolff embarked on a tour that visited Europe in December 2015. In October 2016, she was an opening act in support of experimental rock band Swans' Europe tour.

The black and white artwork for The Miraculous was shot by Anders Nydam in an abandoned house in Sweden's forests. Even though he was skeptical about visiting the location, von Hausswolff convinced him to do it. After shooting the cover with an analog camera, Nydam chose a photograph that he "freaked out" because he felt it represents the album's concept. Critics perceived the artwork to be inspired by nightmares because of von Hausswolff's faceless picture. The singer also made copper etchings for the packaging of the album.

== Reception ==
Professional ratings
Aggregate scores
Source	Rating
AnyDecentMusic?	8.0/10
Metacritic	82/100
Review scores
Source	Rating
The 405	8.5/10
AllMusic	4/5 stars
DIY	3/5 stars
Drowned in Sound	8/10
Loud and Quiet	9/10
Mojo	4/5 stars
MusicOMH	4/5 stars
The Observer	4/5 stars
Pitchfork	7.8/10
Uncut	4/5 stars

The Miraculous received widespread acclaim from music critics. At Metacritic, which assigns a normalized rating out of 100 to reviews from mainstream publications, the album received an average score of 82, based on 11 reviews. Drowned in Sound ranked the album at number 76 on their list of "Favourite Albums of Year 2015". The Miraculous was nominated for Rock of the Year at the 2016 Grammis Awards, and was named Album of the Year by Elin Unnes from Swedish newspaper Dagens Nyheter. In Sweden, The Miraculous debuted at number eight for a week, becoming von Hausswolff's first album to miss the top five in that country.

== Track listing ==
All tracks are written by Anna von Hausswolff, except "Come Wander With Me / Deliverance", also written by Jeff Alexander and Anthony Wilson. All tracks are produced by Filip Leyman.

The Miraculous track listing
No.	Title	Length
1.	"Discovery"	8:45
2.	"The Hope Only of Empty Men"	3:10
3.	"Pomperipossa"	2:12
4.	"Come Wander With Me / Deliverance"	10:49
5.	"En ensam vandrare"	2:55
6.	"An Oath"	3:01
7.	"Evocation"	3:07
8.	"The Miraculous"	9:59
9.	"Stranger"	5:28
Total length:		49:26

Notes

- "Come Wander With Me / Deliverance" contains a cover of the song "Come Wander With Me".

== Personnel ==
Credits adapted from the liner notes of The Miraculous.

Musicians

- Anna von Hausswolff – vocals, pipe organ, synthesizers
- Filip Leyman – vocals (1), synthesizers, drums (5)
- Karl Vento – vocals (1), guitar
- Maria von Hausswolff – vocals (9)
- Joel Fabiansson – guitar
- Ulrik Ording – drums
- Daniel Ögren – clavioline (1)

Technical

- Filip Leyman – recording, production, mixing
- Hans Olsson Brookes – mastering

Artwork

- Anders Nydam – cover photo, layout
- Anna von Hausswolff – etchings

== Charts ==
Chart performance for The Miraculous
Chart (2015)	Peak position
Swedish Albums (Sverigetopplistan)	8
UK Independent Album Breakers (OCC)	16
