= Annedal =

District of Gothenburg, Sweden

Coordinates: 57°41′32″N 11°57′31″E

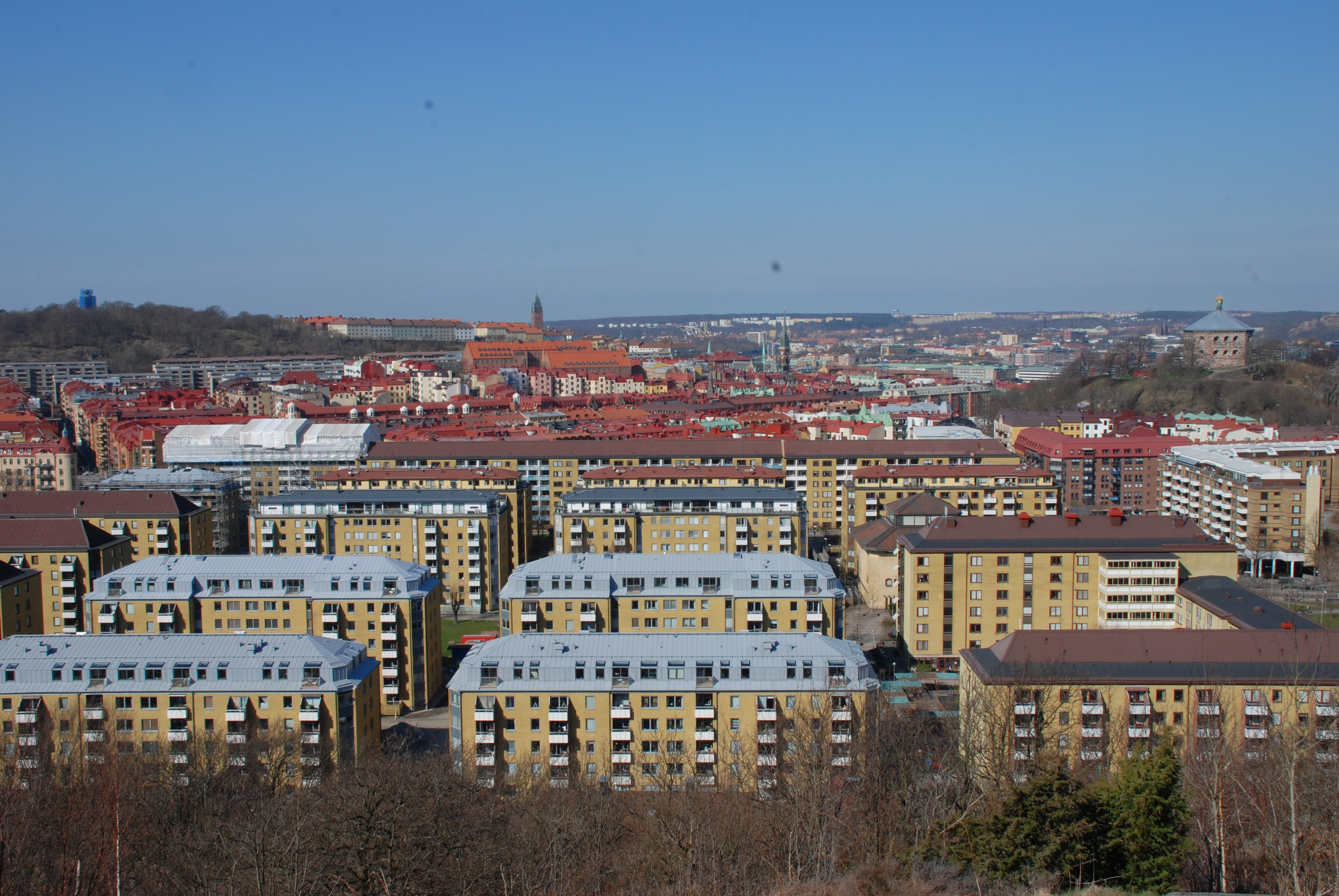
2014

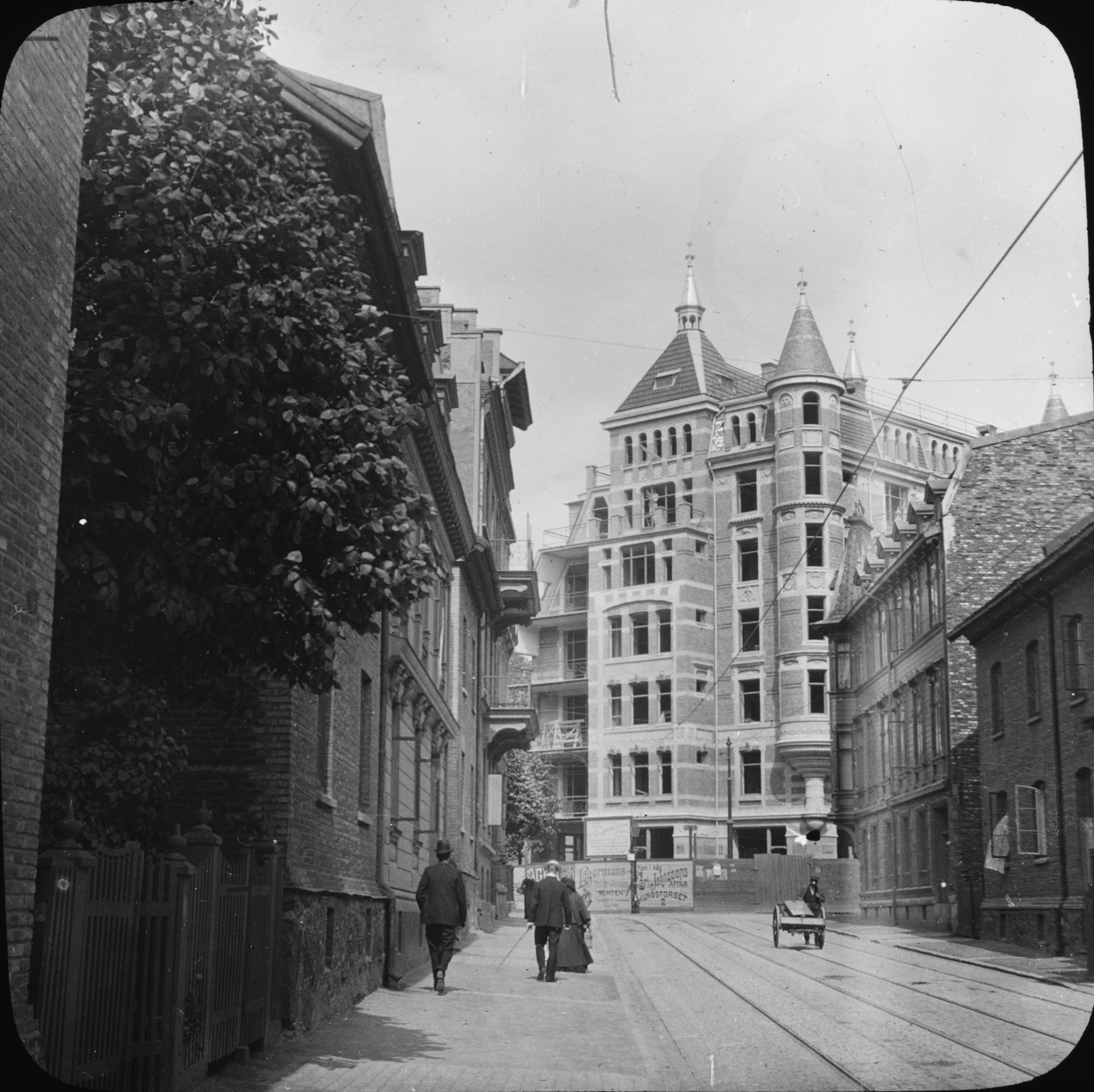
1903

Annedal is a district of Gothenburg, Sweden, which falls with the borough of Linnéstaden. It is an older traditional working class district. Much of the original housing was demolished in the late 1960s and early 1970s for the construction of modern housing estates.

The Annedal Church, established in 1910, is located there.

The first Landshövdingehus was built in Annedal.

People from Annedal include:

- Christina Lindberg
- Bertil Envall
- Arvid E. Gillstrom
- Olle Åkerlund
- Bengt Rasin

== See also ==
- Boroughs and districts of Gothenburg
- Districts of Sweden
