= Härlanda Church Ruins =

Ruined church in Gothenburg, Sweden

Coordinates: 57°43′11″N 12°1′21″E

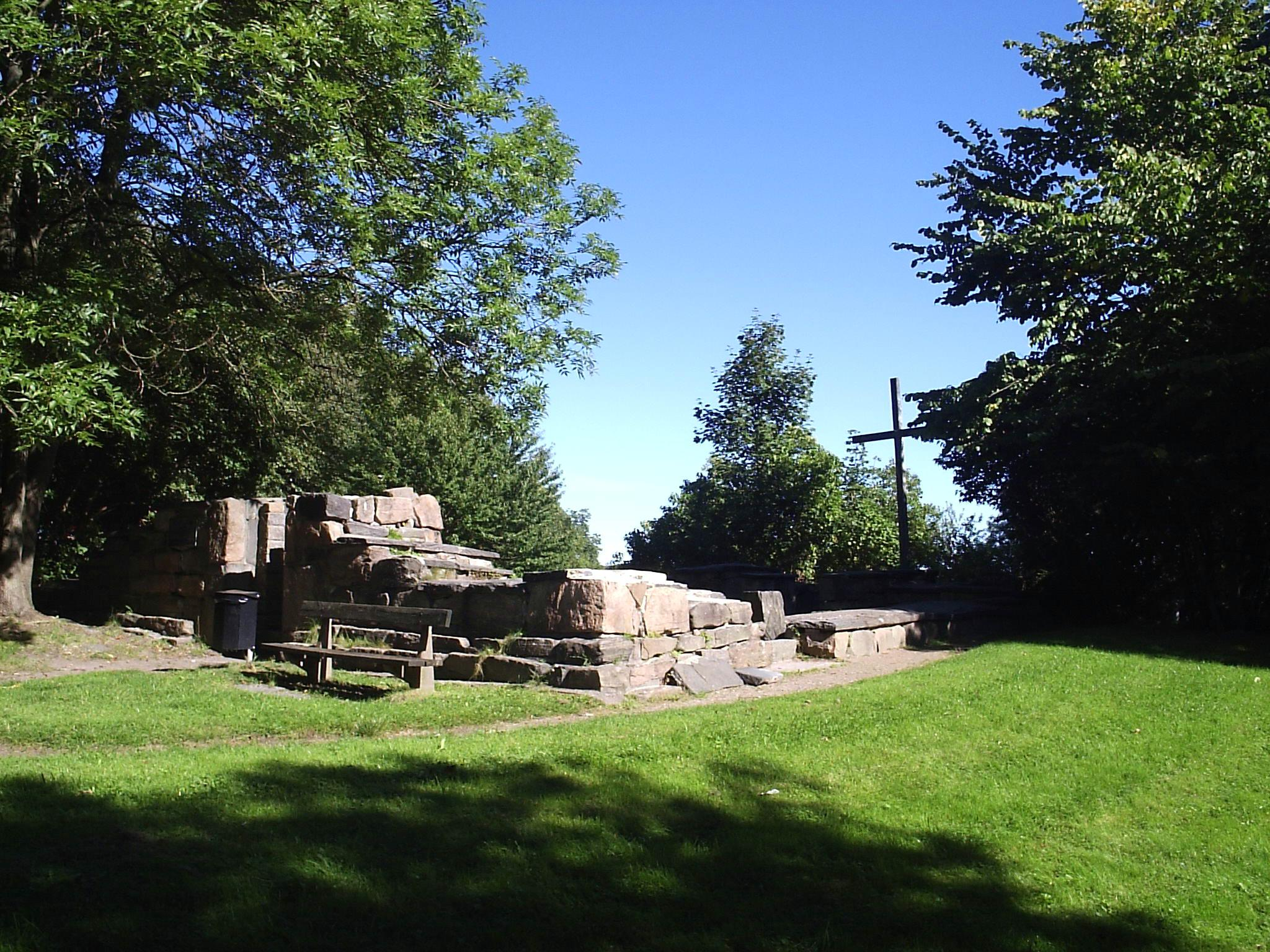
Härlanda kyrkoruin. 2005

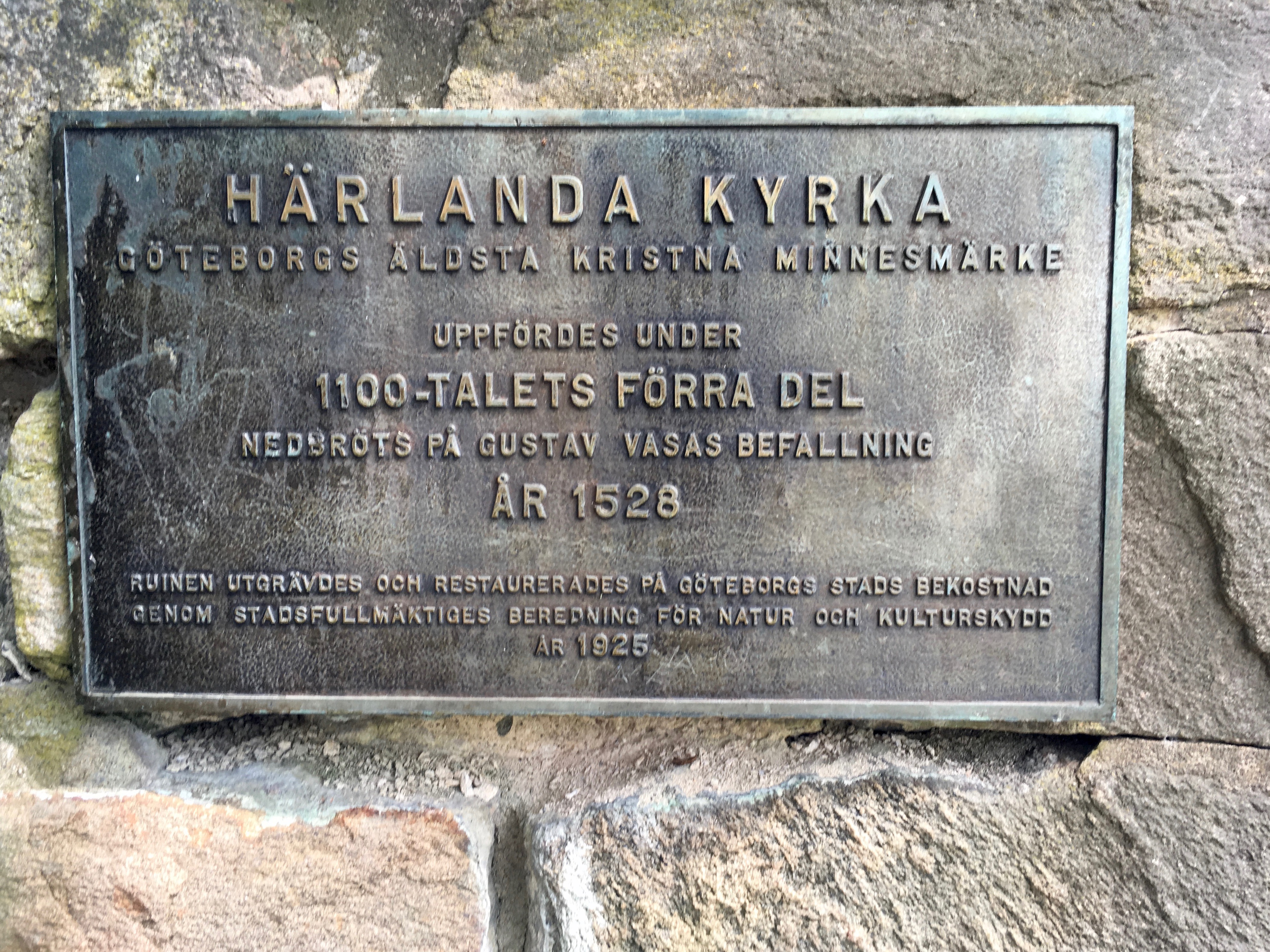
Plaque telling about the demolition and the restoration

Härlanda Church Ruins (Swedish: Härlanda kyrkoruin) are the remains of a medieval church in Gothenburg, Sweden.

== History ==
The church was built in the first part of the 12th century and torn down in 1528 by request from King Gustav I of Sweden to build Lödöse which became an important trade city and which would serve as the precursor of Gothenburg which was founded in 1621. The ruin were excavated by Gothenburg Museum curator Carl Ramsell af Ugglas (1884-1946) and restored at the expense of the City of Gothenburg in 1925.

== See also ==
- History of Gothenburg

== Related reading ==
- Carl Ramsell af Ugglas (1931) Lödöse: (gamla Lödöse) : historia och arkeologi. Skrifter utgivna till Göteborgs stads trehundraårsjubileum genom jubileumsutställningens publikationskommitté (Göteborg: Medéns bokh)
