= Anna von Hausswolff =

Swedish musician (born 1986)

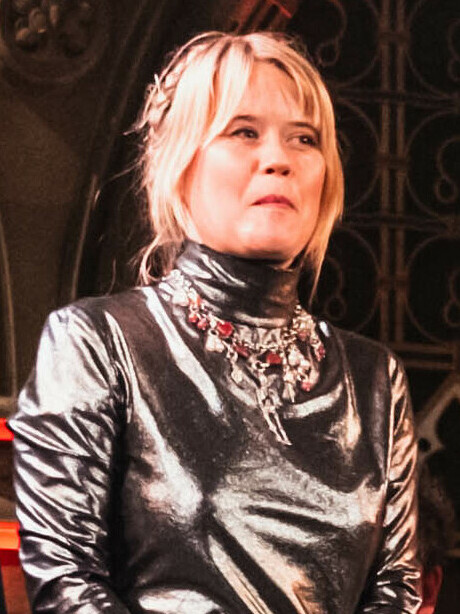
- Von Hausswolff in 2022

Background information
- Born: Anna Michaela Ebba Electra von Hausswolff; 6 September 1986 (age 40); Gothenburg, Sweden
- Genres: Art pop; neoclassical darkwave; ambient pop; ethereal wave; experimental rock; drone
- Occupations: Singer; songwriter; musician; composer
- Instruments: Vocals; pipe organ; piano; synthezisers
- Years active: 2008–present
- Labels: YEAR0001; Southern Lord; Kning Disk; City Slang; Other Music Recording Co.; Pomperipossa Records
- Website: annavonhausswolff.com

Anna Michaela Ebba Electra von Hausswolff (born 6 September 1986) is a Swedish singer-songwriter and composer. She is known for her gothic-styled music, usually accompanied by the pipe organ. Von Hausswolff's music has received praise from music critics, though it resulted in protests from Catholic fundamentalist groups.

== Early life ==
Born in Gothenburg, Sweden, von Hausswolff is the daughter of avant-garde sound artist Carl Michael von Hausswolff. She was a student of architecture at Chalmers University of Technology.

== Career ==
Von Hausswolff released her debut single, "Track of Time", on 5 February 2010, followed by the debut album Singing from the Grave. The album was warmly received by the Swedish press. She played the Way Out West Festival in 2009. In March 2010, she opened for Tindersticks on three occasions and toured Brazil with Taken by Trees and Taxi Taxi! Then in 2011, she opened for Lykke Li thrice, and also for M.Ward at the Royal Dramatic Theatre in Stockholm. She has played at several big festivals in Sweden such as Peace and Love, Storsjöyran, Way Out West, Arvika, and Made Festival.

Hausswolff is noted for her expressive voice and her live performances, and is sometimes compared to Diamanda Galás.

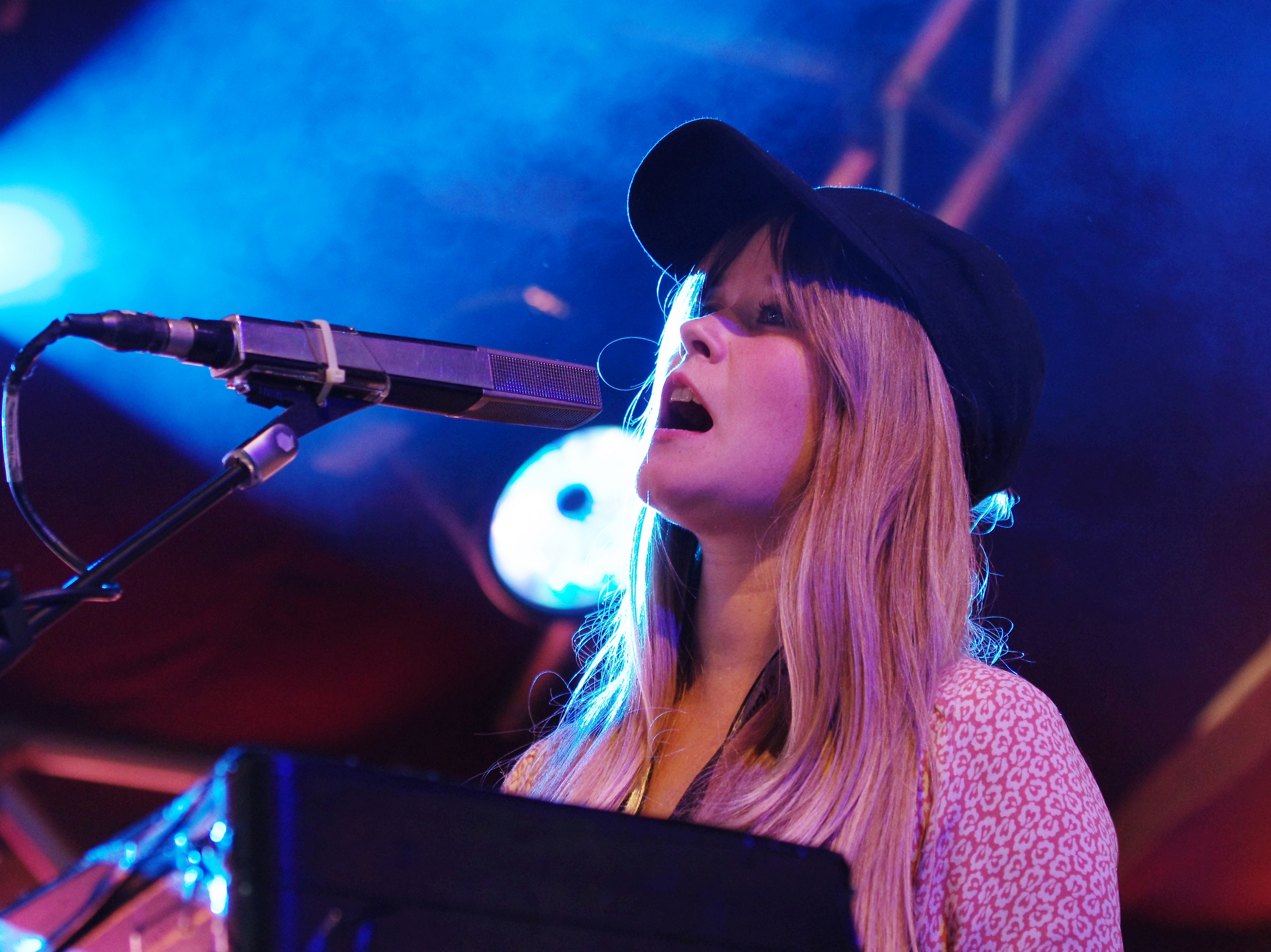
Anna von Hausswolff performing at Haldern Pop 2013

On July 9, 2013, Ceremony was released in North America by Other Music Recording Co., and Anna von Hausswolff played her debut US show on July 10 at Glasslands Gallery in Brooklyn, New York.

The album received strong support from NPR's Bob Boilen, who said "Von Hausswolff's voice possesses the power to soar with those mighty pipes and still hold tight to delicate, personal emotions. I hope to find one album like Ceremony every year — a rare, thoughtful, inspiring record for a night on the couch or a candlelit evening — and now I've got one for 2013." She was also featured on NPR's Weekend Edition, PRI's The World, WNYC Soundcheck, the New York Times, Pitchfork and more.

Von Hausswolff released her fourth album, Dead Magic, in March 2018. It received critical acclaim, with some calling it her "darkest, most ambitious record to date". Von Hausswolff produced the album with Sunn O)))'s producer Randall Dunn and was recorded on the 20th-century pipe organ at Copenhagen's rococo-style Marble Church. Von Hausswolff hoped that the album causes listeners to accept mystery and ambiguity in an "extremely materialistic society where everything needs to be explained."

She sang on the song "Born From the Serpent's Eye" by Wolves in the Throne Room, from their 2017 album Thrice Woven. Von Hausswolff and her sister Maria contributed guest vocals to Swans' 2019 album Leaving Meaning. She also appears on the Sunn O))) live album Metta, Benevolence.

Her fifth album, All Thoughts Fly, was released in 2020. It was recorded using the pipe organ of Örgryte New Church in Gothenburg, which is a Swedish replica of the Arp Schnitger organ in Germany and the largest organ tuned in quarter-comma meantone temperament worldwide.

In 2022, her music was performed at the Union Chapel in London on the opening night of "Organ Reframed". The London Contemporary Orchestra played her music and that of Ipek Gorgun and Abul Mogard.

Her sixth album, Iconoclasts, was released on 31 October 2025. It featured guest appearances from musicians including Iggy Pop and Ethel Cain and received acclaim from music critics. Her North American tour, originally scheduled to begin in March 2026, was postponed to January 2027 because of visa issues with her band members. In April 2026, Von Hausswolff sang with the Joffrey Ballet at Zellerbach Hall on the campus of UC Berkeley. The program was Alexander Ekman's Midsummer Night's Dream. An interview published in its April/May issue of Cal Performances described the experience.

In September 2026, Von Hausswolff joined the voice cast of the upcoming animated fantasy film The Turning Door.

== Artistry ==
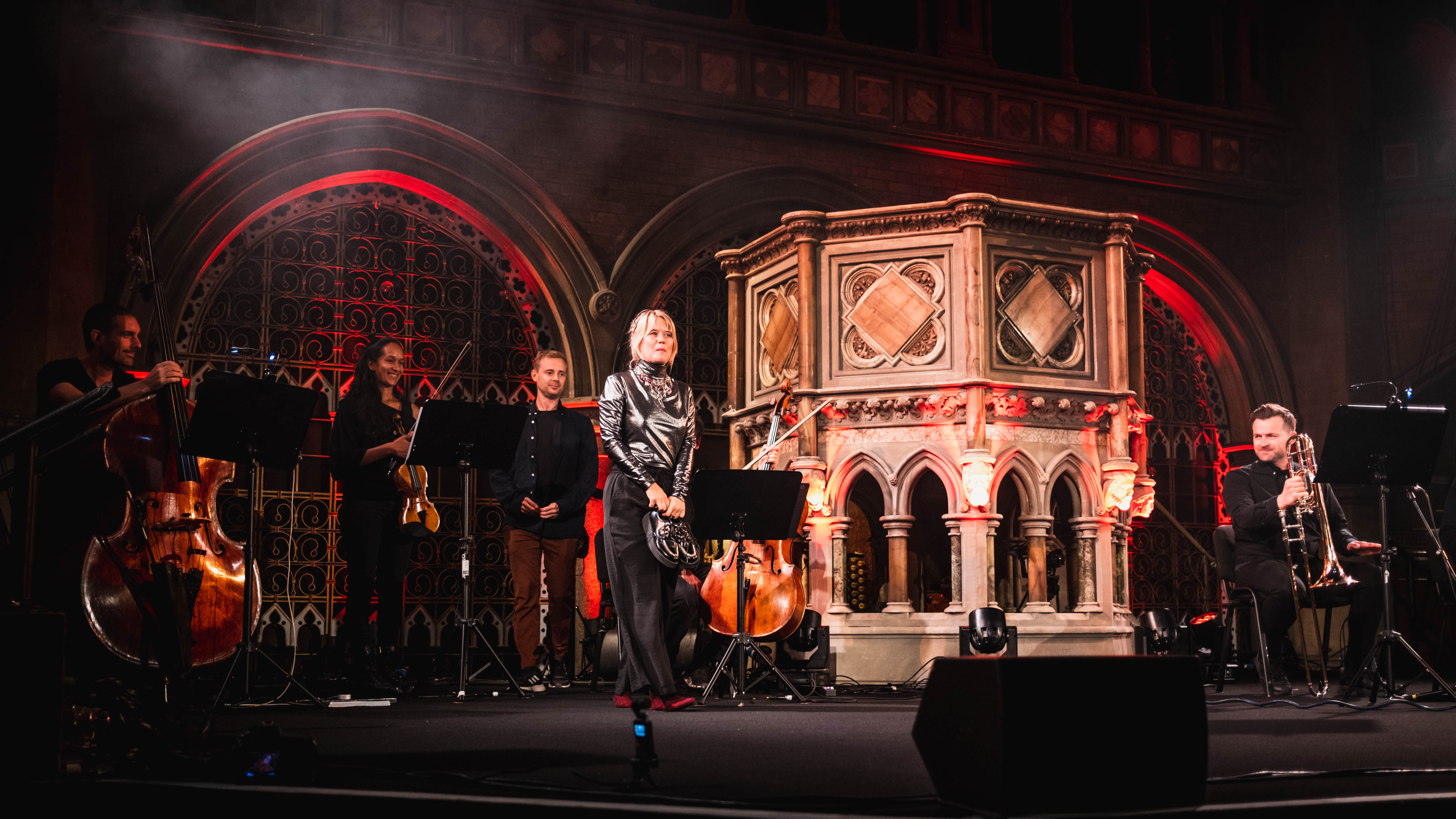
Anna von Hausswolff at "Organ Reframed" at the Union Chapel, Islington in September 2022

Von Hausswolff's gothic-style music is described as "art pop, drone, and post-metal", with "a juxtaposition of dark and bright". The Guardian has described it as "funeral pop". Her 2015 release, The Miraculous, is noted for its "gothic splendour". Dead Magic shows a "brighter, poppier beat". Her vocals are similar to Nico, Diamanda Galás, Peruvian soprano Yma Sumac, and are compared to Kate Bush and A Kiss In The Dreamhouse-era Siouxsie Sioux. Her music is associated with the Krautrock genre with odes to Einstürzende Neubauten and Swans.

The pipe organ features heavily in her work. In an interview with The National about the album, she spoke to the physically demanding nature of the instrument, "You are working with your hands and feet, and you have all these stops that you are pulling in and out to make flute sounds, or maybe trumpet sounds. If you are playing fast it’s like dancing – you have to move the entire body to make it work.”

== Controversies ==
On 7 December 2021, von Hausswolff cancelled her planned concert at the Notre-Dame de Bon-Port in Nantes, France, following boycott demands from fundamentalist Catholic groups. Deeming her music "satanic", the protestors blocked the church's entrance. Complaints against von Hausswolff include her 2009 song "Pills", which features the lyrics "I made love with the devil". However, the scheduled concerts were instrumental on organ without lyrics. The concert, organized by Le Lieu unique, had been scheduled with approval from the Roman Catholic Diocese of Nantes. On 9 December 2021, a concert planned at Saint-Eustache church in Paris was also threatened and rescheduled to the Protestant Unie de l'Etoile church, a location kept secret until the last moment except for ticket holders. In a press release, the priest of Saint-Eustache explained that show was cancelled due to security reasons, and not due to the content of von Hausswolff's work. Organisers for von Hausswolff and the Syndicat des musiques actuelles (SMA) lamented the lack of political support for the holding of the concert. The organiser and the spectators of the canceled concert in Nantes have announced intentions to file a complaint against the fundamentalists for obstructing freedom of expression. Von Hausswolff has denied the accusations of Satanism.

On 13 December 2021, a show at the Dominican Order Saint-Dominique de Bruxelles church in Brussels also received threats. The concerts, which were sold out, nonetheless took place but under police protection. Approximately 100 people turned out to protest, but were more peaceful than the protestors in France.

== Discography ==
=== Albums ===
==== Studio albums ====
- Singing from the Grave (2010)
- Ceremony (2012)
- The Miraculous (2015)
- Dead Magic (2018)
- All Thoughts Fly (2020)
- Iconoclasts (2025)

==== Live albums ====
- Live at Montreux Jazz Festival (2022)

=== Extended plays ===
- Track of Time (2010)
- Källan (Prototype) (2014)
- Källan (Betatype) (2016)

== Filmography ==
- The Turning Door (voice) (2027)
