= Bagaregården =

Urban district in Gothenburg, Sweden

Coordinates: 57°43′8″N 12°0′33″E

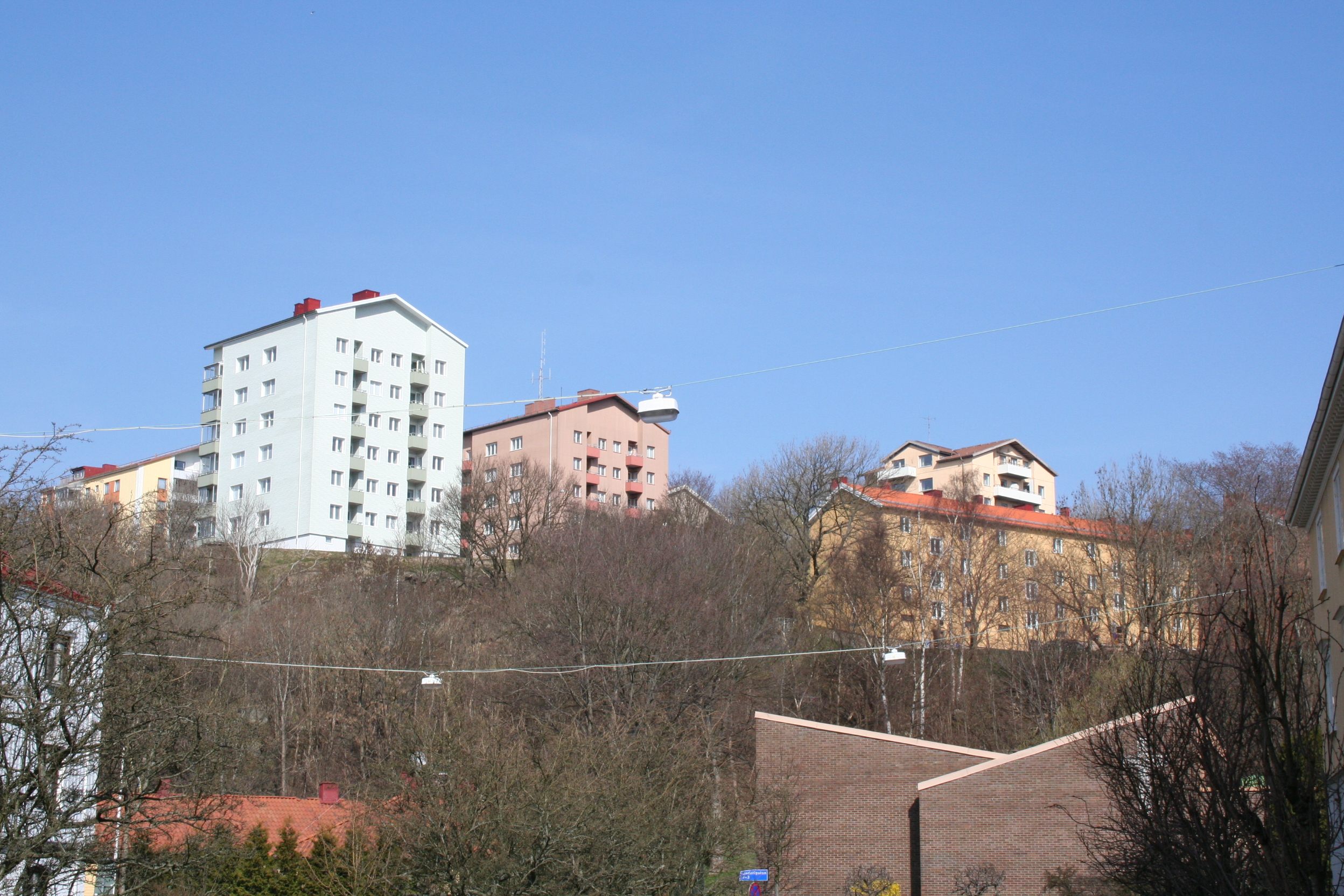
Bagaregården hilltop as seen from Stockholmsgatan. Redbergskyrkan on the bottom right

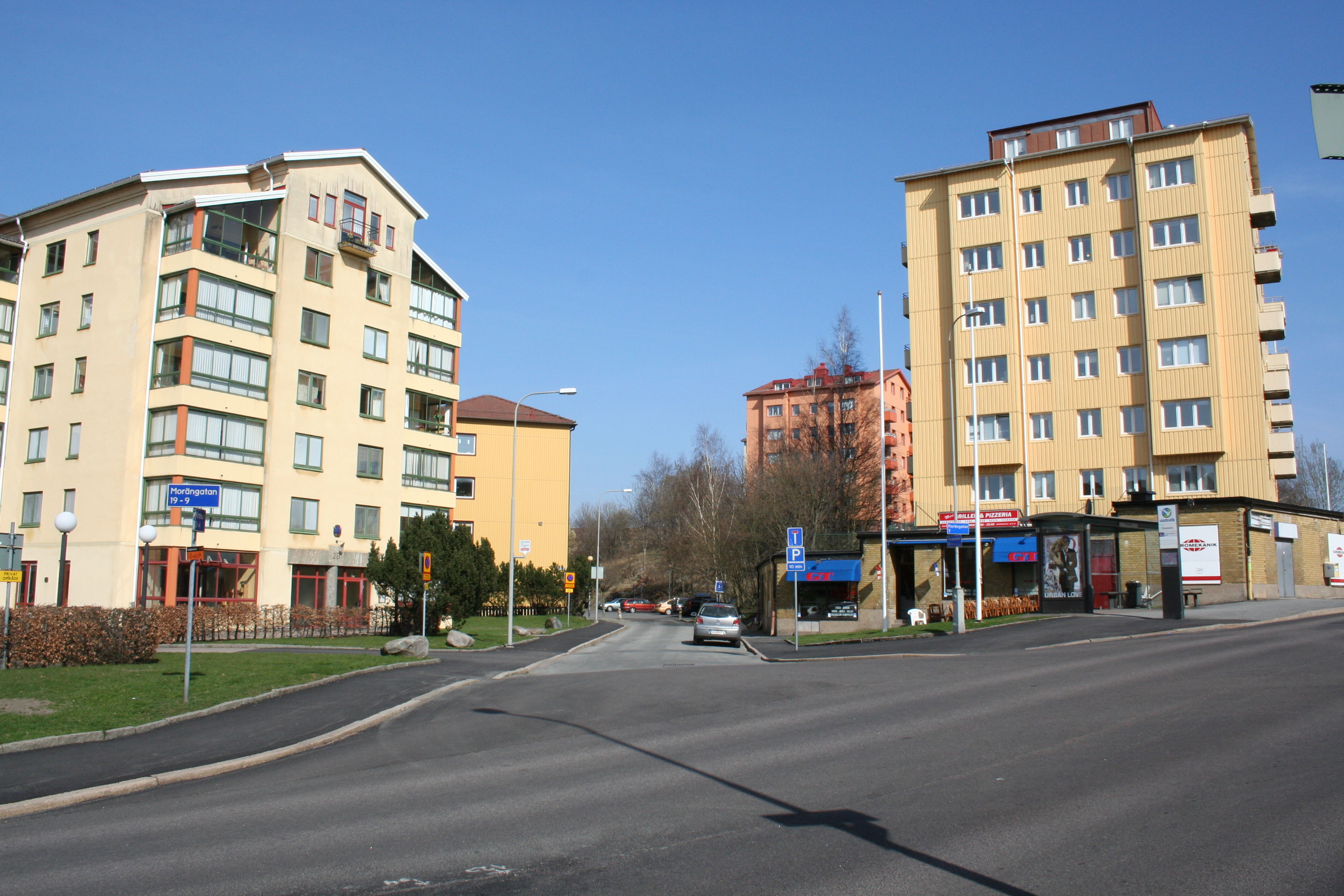
Bagaregården hilltop

Bagaregården is a district in Gothenburg, Sweden, which belongs to Örgryte borough.

Most parts of the district were designed by town planner Albert Lilienberg. He was inspired by the Austrian architect Camillo Sitte. There are many Landshövdingehus in the area.

The term "bagaregård" (the indefinite form of "bagaregården") translates into "baker's estate", with the district being named after a former estate by the same name.

Close to Bagaregården lie the remains of a medieval church, Härlanda Church Ruins. It was torn down by request from Gustavus I of Sweden.
