= Dead Magic =

Studio album by Anna von Hausswolff
- Released: 2 March 2018
- Length: 47:19
- Label: City Slang
- Producer: Randall Dunn

Anna von Hausswolff chronology
The Miraculous (2015)	Dead Magic (2018)	All Thoughts Fly (2020)

Professional ratings
Aggregate scores
Source	Rating
AnyDecentMusic?	7.4/10
Metacritic	81/100
Review scores
Source	Rating
AllMusic	4/5 stars
Drowned in Sound	5/10
The Guardian	4/5 stars
Loud and Quiet	9/10
Mojo	4/5 stars
MusicOMH	4.5/5 stars
PopMatters	9/10
Q	4/5 stars
Uncut	8/10
Under the Radar	8/10

Dead Magic is the fourth studio album by Swedish musician Anna von Hausswolff. It was released on 2 March 2018 on City Slang and received critical acclaim.

== Background and recording ==
The album was written by Hausswolff during the summer of 2016, in her hometown of Gothenburg and then the majority of it was recorded the following year at Frederik's Church located in Copenhagen, Denmark.

== Reception ==
Upon release, Dead Magic received critical acclaim. At Metacritic, which assigns a normalized rating out of 100 reviews from mainstream critics, the album has an average score of 81, indicating "universal acclaim".

== Track listing ==
All tracks are written by Anna von Hausswolff.

No.	Title	Length
1.	"The Truth, the Glow, the Fall"	12:08
2.	"The Mysterious Vanishing of Electra"	6:09
3.	"Ugly and Vengeful"	16:17
4.	"The Marble Eye"	5:19
5.	"Källans återuppståndelse"	7:26
Total length:		47:19

== Personnel ==
Musicians

- Anna von Hausswolff – vocals, pipe organ, Mellotron
- Filip Leyman – synthesizer
- Karl Vento – guitar
- Joel Fabiansson – guitar
- David Sabel – bass guitar
- Ulrik Ording – drums
- Shahzad Ismaily – percussion (track 1)
- Úlfur Hansson – string arrangements (tracks: 1, 3)
- Gyda Valtysdottir – strings
- Randall Dunn – Mellotron, Korg MS-20, sound designer

Production

- Randall Dunn – production, mixing
- Jason Ward – mastering

Design

- Anna von Hausswolff – design, layout, inner sleeve drawing
- Magnus Andersson – layout
- Maria von Hausswolff – cover photograph

== Charts ==
Chart performance for Dead Magic
Chart (2018)	Peak position
Austrian Albums (Ö3 Austria)	53
Belgian Albums (Ultratop Flanders)	106
German Albums (Offizielle Top 100)	52
Scottish Albums (Official Charts)	73
Swedish Albums (Sverigetopplistan)	7
Swiss Albums (Schweizer Hitparade)	53
UK Independent Albums (Official Charts)	14
