= Annedal Church =

Coordinates: 57.6871°N 11.9541°E

- Annedalskyrkan
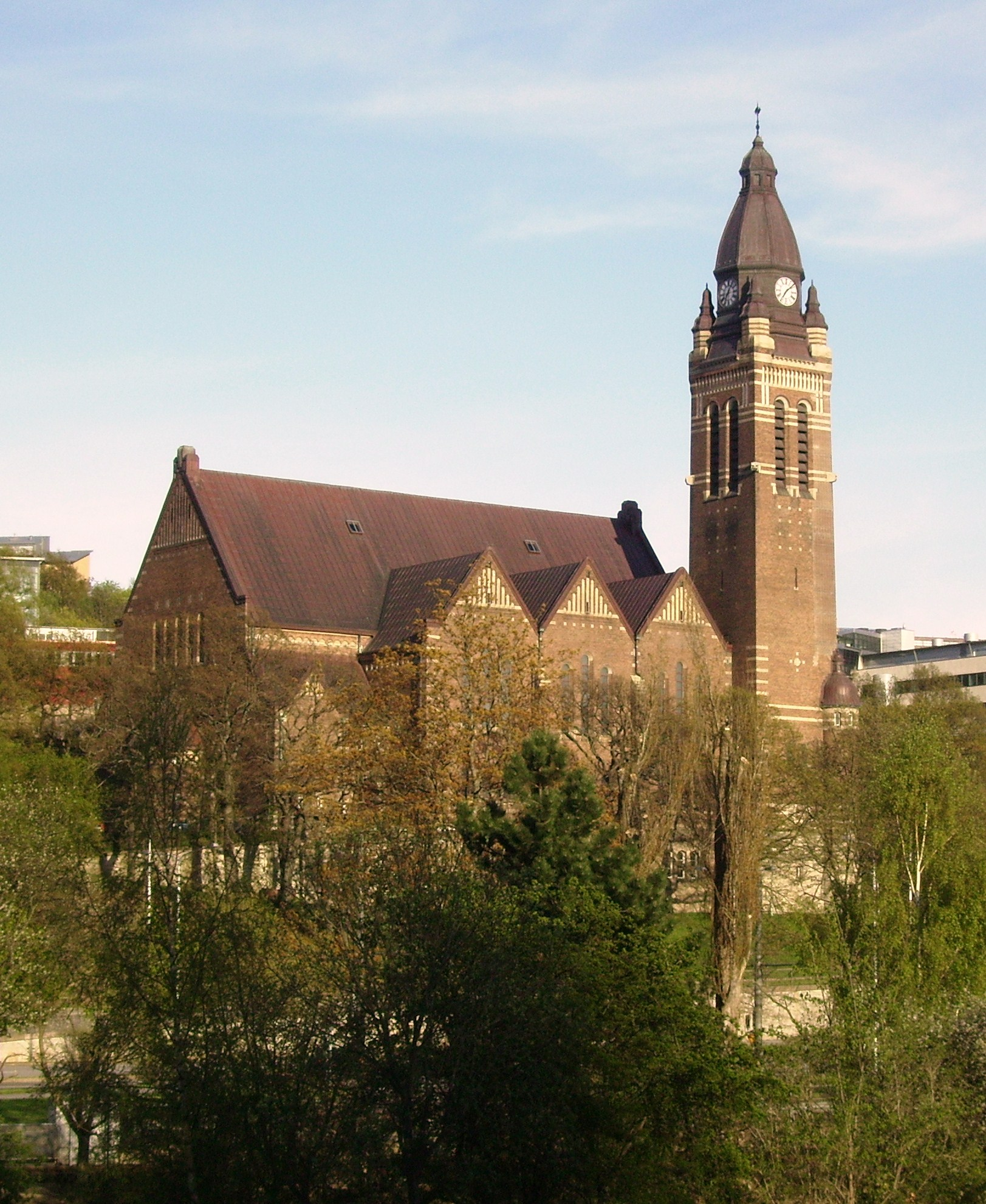
- The Annedal Church in May 2010
- Annedal Church
- Location: Annedal
- Country: Sweden
- Denomination: Church of Sweden

History
- Consecrated: 25 September 1910

Architecture
- Architect: Theodor Wåhlin

Administration
- Diocese: Gothenburg
- Parish: Gothenburg Annedal

The Annedal Church (Swedish: Annedalskyrkan) is a church building in Annedal in Gothenburg, Sweden. Belonging to the Gothenburg Annedal Parish of the Church of Sweden, construction begun in 1908 and the church was opened on Thanksgiving Day, 25 September 1910 by bishop Edvard Herman Rodhe.
