= Zola Jesus discography =

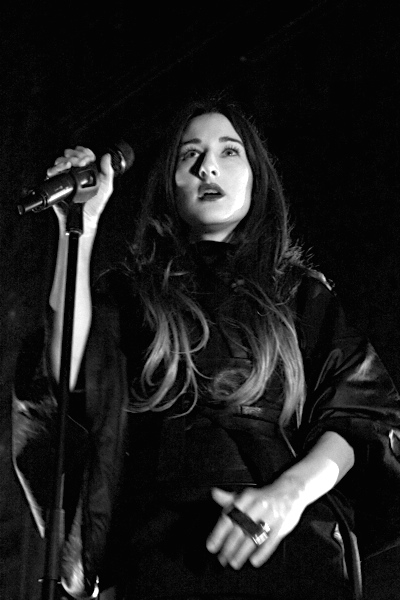
- Zola Jesus at Webster Hall in October 2014
- Studio albums: 6
- EPs: 4
- Compilation albums: 2
- Singles: 18
- Split albums: 2

American singer and songwriter Zola Jesus has released six studio albums, two compilation albums, two split albums, four extended plays and eighteen singles.

== Albums ==
=== Studio albums ===
List of studio albums, with selected chart positions
Title	Album details	Peak positions					
Title	Album details	US	US Dance	US Heat.	US Ind.	FRA	UK
The Spoils	Released: July 13, 2009; Label: Sacred Bones; Format: CD, digital download, LP	—	—	—	—	—	—
Stridulum II	Released: August 23, 2010; Label: Souterrain Transmissions; Format: CD, digital download, LP	—	—	—	—	181	—
Conatus	Released: September 26, 2011; Label: Sacred Bones; Format: CD, digital download, LP	175	6	7	30	158	144
Taiga	Released: October 6, 2014; Label: Mute; Format: CD, digital download, LP	—	—	9	40	—	—
Okovi	Released: September 8, 2017; Label: Sacred Bones; Format: CD, digital download, LP	—	12	4	25	—	—
Arkhon	Released: June 24, 2022; Label: Sacred Bones; Format: CD, digital download, LP	—	—	—	—	—	—

=== Compilation albums ===
List of compilation albums, with selected chart positions
Title	Album details	Peak positions
Title	Album details	US Heat.
Versions	Released: August 20, 2013; Label: Sacred Bones; Formats: LP, CD, digital download	23
Okovi: Additions	Released: April 6, 2018; Label: Sacred Bones; Formats: LP, CD, digital download	—

=== Split albums ===
List of split albums
Title	Album details
Untitled	Released: 2009; Nature: Split album with Burial Hex; A1: "Go Crystal Tears" (Burial Hex) – 4:49; A2: "Temple of the Flood (Burial Hex) – 14:31; B: "Julius & Ethel" (Zola Jesus) – 19:27; Label: Aurora Borealis
LA Vampires Meets Zola Jesus	Released: 2010; Nature: 7-track joint album with LA Vampires; Label: Not Not Fun; Format: CD, digital download, LP

== EPs ==
List of EPs, with selected details
Title	EP details
New Amsterdam	Released: 2009; Nature: 10-track EP; Label: Sacred Bones
Tsar Bomba	Released: 2009; Nature: 7-track EP; Label: Troubleman Unlimited
Stridulum	Released: 2010; Nature: 7-track EP; Label: Sacred Bones
Valusia	Released: 2010; Nature: 4-track EP; Label: Sacred Bones

== Singles ==
List of singles, with selected chart positions
Title / Backed with	Year	Charts	Album
Title / Backed with	Year	FRA	Album
"Poor Sons"	2009	—	The Spoils
"The Way"	2009	—	The Spoils
"Dog"	2009	—	The Spoils
"Soeur Sewer"	2009	—	The Spoils
"Odessa"	2009	—	The Spoils
"Poor Animal"	2010	—	Stridulum II
"I Can't Stand"	2010		Stridulum II
"Night"	2010	—	Stridulum II
"Sea Talk"	2010	—	Stridulum II
"Vessel" / "Conatus"	2011	—	Conatus
"Days Grow Older" / "Seekir"	2011	—	Conatus
"In Your Nature" / "In Your Nature" (David Lynch Remix)	2012	—	Conatus
"New France" (Orbital featuring Zola Jesus)	2012	—	
"Skin"	2013	172	Conatus
"Avalanche (Slow)"	2013	—	Versions
"Fall Back"	2013	—	Versions
"Dangerous Days"	2014	—	Taiga
"Hunger"	2015	—	Taiga
"Nail"	2015	—	Taiga
"Exhumed"	2017	—	Okovi
"Soak"	2017	—	Okovi
"Siphon"	2017	—	Okovi
"Krunk"	2020	—	Non Album Single
"Lost"	2022	—	Arkhon
"Desire"	2022	—	Arkhon
"The Fall"	2022	—	Arkhon
"Into The Wild"	2022	—	Arkhon

== Collaborations ==
List of collaborations
Year	Tracks	Artist	Album	Record label
2009	"Hold On" "Mother" "In Earth's Palm" "The Bull and the Ram" "This is My Last Goodbye"	Former Ghosts	Fleurs	Upset the Rhythm
2010	"Year of the Ox"	Fucked Up	—N/a	Merge Records
2010	"Chin Up" "Only in Time"	Former Ghosts	New Love	Upset the Rhythm
2011	"Intro" "The Only Direction in Concrete"	M83; Prefuse 73	Hurry Up, We're Dreaming; The Only She Chapters	Naïve Records; Warp Records
2012	"New France" (feat. Zola Jesus)	Orbital	Wonky	ACP
2013	"In Templum Dei" (feat. Zola Jesus)	Jozef van Wissem	Only Lovers Left Alive original soundtrack	ATP Recordings
2015	"Past Selves" "Pawfluffer Night"	Former Ghosts; Run the Jewels	Former Ghosts, Funeral Advantage – Split EP; Meow the Jewels	The Native Sound; Mass Appeal Records
2015	"Night" (Zola Jesus and Dean Hurley remix)	John Carpenter	Lost Themes	Sacred Bones
2017	"Howl"	Black Asteroid	Thrust	Last Gang Records
2018	"Stillbirth" (Zola Jesus remix)	Alice Glass	Alice Glass Remixes	Loma Vista Recordings
2019	"Matters"	ionnalee	Remember the Future	To whom it may concern.
2020	"Miami"	NBA Stupid A$s	Non-album single	Non-label release
