= Thrice Woven =

Studio album by Wolves in the Throne Room
- Released: September 22, 2017
- Studios: Owl Lodge, Olympia; Studio Litho, Seattle; Avast Recording Company
- Genres: Black metal; dark ambient; folk metal
- Length: 42:17
- Languages: English; Swedish
- Label: Artemisia Records
- Producers: Wolves in the Throne Room; Randall Dunn

Wolves in the Throne Room chronology
Celestite (2014)	Thrice Woven (2017)	Primordial Arcana (2021)

Thrice Woven is the sixth studio album by American black metal band Wolves in the Throne Room. The album was released on September 22, 2017 through the band's own record label, Artemisia Records. The album was produced collaboratively with Randall Dunn and recorded primarily in their own recording studio Owl Lodge in Olympia, Washington, which the Weaver brothers built themselves, with the drums recorded at Studio Litho in Seattle. Thrice Woven received generally favorable reviews from music critics upon its release.

== Background ==
Thrice Woven is the first black metal album by Wolves in the Throne Room since 2011's Celestial Lineage, which the band consider the final chapter in a trilogy of albums comprising Two Hunters, Black Cascade, and Celestial Lineage. The band regard their 2014 ambient album Celestite as being a companion piece to Celestial Lineage, rather than a successor, and have also stated categorically that Thrice Woven is not connected with the previous records; as a result, Thrice Woven can be considered the band's first 'true' album since 2011. It is also the first album recorded almost entirely in the band's home studio Owl Lodge, and is their first album to feature new permanent band-member Kody Keyworth on guitars and vocals.

== Recording, production ==
The album was recorded almost entirely at the band's home studio, Owl Lodge, in Olympia, Washington. The band recorded the drums at Litho Studio in Seattle with Jack Shirley. According to Aaron Weaver, "Once we finished the drums, we brought the sessions back to our studio in Olympia, Randall Dunn showed up and we kind of made a plan on how to put the record together." He also explained that "Me and Nathan would work by ourselves, tracking guitars, synthesizers, whatever then Randall would show up and kind of check it out and give suggestions. He tracked a lot of stuff too — he always plays a little bit of synthesizer on our records. Once all the tracking was wrapped up, we met up with Randall again in Seattle and mixed at Avast! Studio". In a separate interview, Aaron Weaver explained that "About halfway through recording, we realized it was time to invite Kody Keyworth to be a full member of the band. He'd been playing guitar on the road with us for six years. As we were recording Thrice Woven, we just realized that Kody's got to be on this record — he's a part of this band from now on." As a result, Keyworth "added flavor to Thrice Woven but was uninvolved in the initial work on these songs."

== Musical style, writing ==
Thrice Woven has been described as significantly more aggressive and traditionally black metal than many of the band's previous albums, and both critics and the band themselves have noted the role of new guitarist Kody Keyworth in the album's sound. NPR Music wrote that the album's opening track "recalls the WITTR of Two Hunters and Black Cascade, but is immediately bolder, with a newfound ferocity that feels untethered to the past." Decibel noted that the album "is defined in a good deal of traditionalism, specifically second-wave black metal traditionalism." AllMusic's Thom Jurek likewise noted that "Thrice Woven re-engages with blackness, full signature riffs, epic tunes, and tales of pagan nature worship that established Wolves in the Throne Room's identity. This is a return to the pummeling, multi-layered power that made 2009's Black Cascade a masterpiece."

== Release, promotion, marketing ==
Wolves in the Throne Room announced the initial details (including the track listing, release date, and album cover) of Thrice Woven on June 28, 2017, along with a brief teaser trailer. On July 17, the band premiered their first ever music video for the song "Born from the Serpent's Eye", featuring the first half of the nearly 10-minute piece. According to the band, "We lit a bonfire and blasted through the first third of our song Born From The Serpent’s Eye. [sic] This is the first time we’d played the song with new guitarist Kody Keyworth and it fucking slayed. Peter and Nico captured the magic. May the good fires blaze!” On August 21 the band premiered the song "Angrboda" in full as part of Adult Swim's Singles 2017 series. On September 11, they also premiered the song "Mother Owl, Father Ocean" as a companion piece to the previously released "Angrboda". The album was officially released on September 22, 2017 through the band's own record label Artemisia Records.

== Touring ==
The band have announced they will tour the United States throughout Fall 2017 with Pillorian from September 29 to October 25. They have also announced a European tour from November 15 to December 15, 2017 with support from Aluk Todolo and Wiegedood.

== Critical reception ==
Professional ratings
Aggregate scores
Source	Rating
Metacritic	76/100
Review scores
Source	Rating
AllMusic	3.5/5 stars
The A.V. Club	B
Decibel	8/10
Exclaim!	6/10
Metal Hammer	4/5 stars
Pitchfork	5.2/10
PopMatters	8/10 stars
The Skinny	5/5 stars
Sputnikmusic	4.5/5

Thrice Woven was met with generally positive reviews. At Metacritic, which assigns a normalized rating out of 100 to reviews from mainstream critics, the album received an average score of 76, based on 14 reviews, which indicates "generally favorable reviews".

Critics generally noted the considerably more aggressive and traditionally black metal approach of the album, particularly compared to the band's previous records. The A.V. Club wrote that "Not since acclaimed debut Diadem Of 12 Stars has Wolves In The Throne Room rocked this hard and steady; in its sustained racket, it approximates one of the band’s live shows, which tend to be all blistering blitzkrieg all the time, drone passages withheld", but noting that "this being a WITTR record, the fury comes in crashing waves, emerging monstrously from stretches of placid calm" Decibel named the album 'Best New Noise' and praised Thrice Woven as "a return to the glories of old", highlighting the strength of the songwriting in particular.

== Track listing ==
No.	Title	Length
1.	"Born from the Serpent's Eye" (Featuring Anna von Hausswolff)	9:37
2.	"The Old Ones Are with Us" (Featuring Steve Von Till)	8:36
3.	"Angrboda"	10:02
4.	"Mother Owl, Father Ocean" (Featuring Anna von Hausswolff)	2:33
5.	"Fires Roar in the Palace of the Moon"	11:29
Total length:		42:17

== Personnel ==
=== Wolves in the Throne Room ===
- Nathan Weaver — vocals, guitars
- Aaron Weaver — drums, synthesizers
- Kody Keyworth — guitars, vocals

=== Additional musicians ===
- Don McGreey — acoustic guitar (on track 1)
- Steve Von Till — vocals, acoustic guitar (on track 2)
- Anna Von Hausswolff — vocals (on tracks 1 and 4)
- Phil Petrocelli — percussion (on track 4)
- Zeynep Oyku Yilmaz — grand harp (on track 4)

=== Technical and additional personnel ===
- Randall Dunn — production, engineering
- Jason Ward — mastering
- Jack Shirley — engineering
- William Smith — additional engineering
- Denis Forkas Kostromitin — artwork
- John Westrock — photography
