= Stridulum =

Stridulum may refer to:

- Stridulum, a 1979 Italian-US film released in English as The Visitor
- Stridulum (EP), a 2010 EP by Zola Jesus
- Stridulum II, a 2010 album by Zola Jesus, an expansion of the EP
