= Randall Dunn =

American record producer

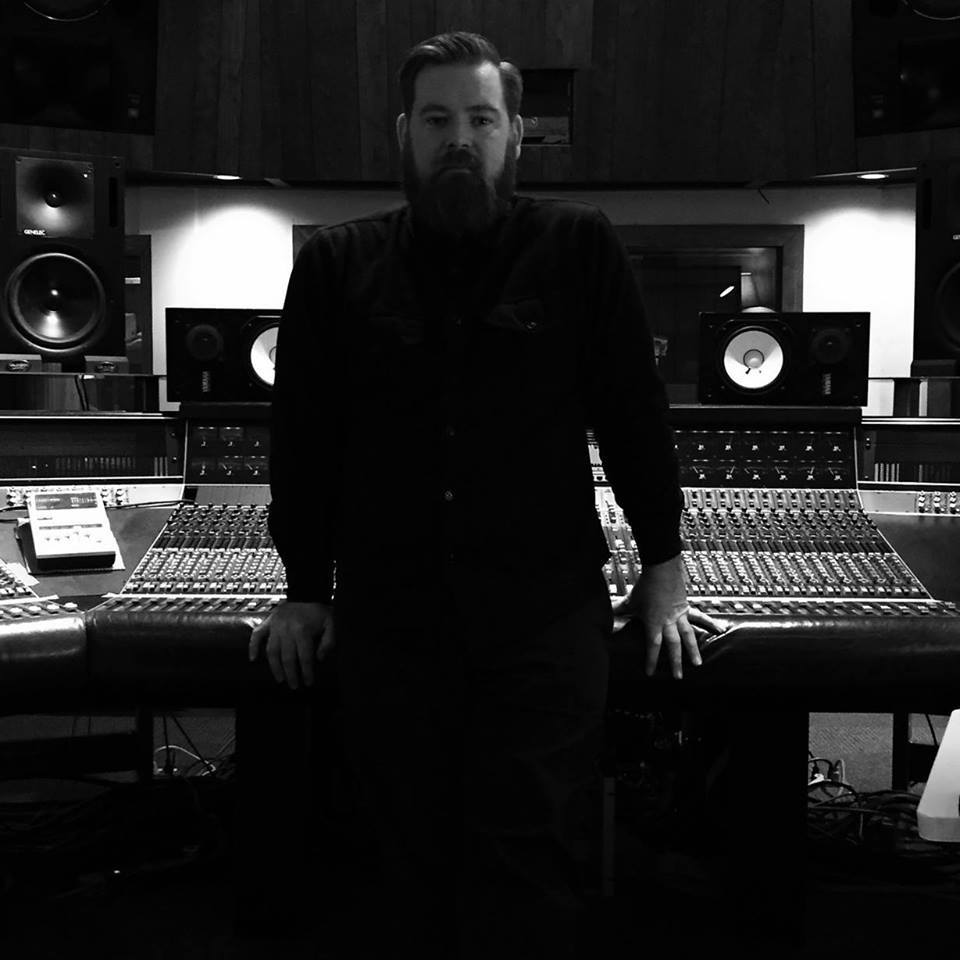
- Dunn c. 2018

Background information
- Origin: Michigan, U.S.
- Genres: Rock, jazz, heavy metal
- Occupations: Record producer, audio engineer, musician
- Years active: 1990s–present

Randall Dunn is an American record producer, audio engineer, composer, and musician.

As a music producer, he has worked with artists and filmmakers including Danny Elfman, Jim Jarmusch, Panos Cosmatos, Nathan Fielder, Benny Safdie, Guillermo Del Toro, Björk, Oneohtrix Point Never, Thurston Moore, Zola Jesus, Algiers, Sunn O))), SQÜRL, Six Organs of Admittance, Marissa Nadler, Boris, Anna Von Hausswolff, Pallbearer, Oren Ambarchi, Eyvind Kang, The Cave Singers, Akron/Family, Earth, Wolves in the Throne Room, and Jesse Sykes, among others. Pitchfork has described him as "a go-to producer for metal but also for indie acts looking to add more edge and atmosphere."

== Early life ==
Originally from Michigan, Dunn moved to Seattle in 1993 to explore his interest in film music. He attended the Art Institute of Seattle to study sound design for film, and formed connections with local musicians, including Skerik and Matt Chamberlain. In an interview, Dunn stated, "I'm sort of a frustrated filmmaker that turned into a record producer. The people I met when I moved here spun me in a way that sent me down this path of treating sound the way I would have treated film."

During his studies he received practical experience at Hanzsek Studios under the instruction of Jack Endino. He gradually became involved in the recording and producing of sessions.

== Career ==
=== Record producer ===
As a fan of the band Naked City, Dunn contacted keyboardist Wayne Horvitz in Seattle who introduced him to Eyvind Kang. Dunn received his first credit for a session with Eyvind Kang, resulting in the piece "5th NADE/Invisible Man" on the 7 NADEs album released in 1996. His involvement resulted in a long-term friendship with Kang, through whom he met a number of musicians, mostly in the jazz-rock genre. Dunn was later introduced to the engineer Mell Dettmer and together they founded Aleph Studios.

In 1998 he engineered the live portion of the album Bumpa by Critters Buggin, while he received a writing credit for his involvement with Mr. Birdy's Fryday by the Rockin' Teenage Combo. In 2001 he worked together with trumpet player Lesli Dalaba and guitarist Bill Horist, releasing the ambient album Zahir. He engineered Kang's 2002 album Live Low to the Earth, in the Iron Age.

In 2005, he was credited as an engineer on the Impaled album Death After Life released through Century Media. In the same year, Dunn met Dylan Carlson of the band Earth in Seattle and recorded their fourth album, Hex; or Printing in the Infernal Method at Aleph Studios.

After hearing his work with Asva, Stephen O'Malley contacted Dunn to produce the collaborative album between Sunn O))) and Boris, Altar. This began a long relationship with the band doing live sound and producing several of their albums including Monoliths & Dimensions and Kannon.

In 2010, Dunn and Omar Souleyman entered the legendary ADA studio in Istanbul to record and produce a remix of Björk's "Crystalline” which was released on her third remix album, Bastards, in 2012. In the same session, Dunn recorded a full-length Omar Souleyman album, which was not released.

Dunn began an ongoing collaboration with Native American glass artist Preston Singletary, whose work has been exhibited at the Smithsonian American Art Museum. Singletary and Bernie Worrell (of Talking Heads and Funkadelic) began recording as Khu.éex’ under Dunn's musical direction in 2013.

In 2017, Dunn entered the studio with Myrkur, producing her second album Mareridt.

In 2018, Dunn produced Anna Von Hausswolff's fourth studio album, Dead Magic. The album was critically well received with reviews highlighting Dunn's attention to capturing her vocal performance. Later that year, Dunn produced Cloud Nothings' fifth studio album, Last Building Burning.

The Association of Danish Music Critics nominated Randall Dunn for Producer of the Year in 2018 for his work with Sort Sol, Myrkur, and Childrenn.

Following the release of Panos Cosmatos' Mandy, Dunn and Cosmatos conceived a fictional record made by the character Jeremiah Sand. Along with Milky Burgess, Dunn produced and co-wrote Jeremiah Sand's Lift It Down, which was issued by Sacred Bones in 2018. Pitchfork described the record as “[...] a forged artifact, an album recorded largely because those who created it had so much fun inhabiting its outlandish world.” The record featured Angel Deradoorian, Tad Doyle, Faith Coloccia (Mamiffer), Monika Knot (Zen Mother), and Marissa Nadler.

On November 9, 2018, Dunn released his first solo studio album titled Beloved. It featured guest vocals from Frank Fisher of Algiers and Zola Jesus.

Dunn produced American doom metal band Pallbearer's fourth album in 2020, Forgotten Days, which was released by Nuclear Blast and described by Consequence of Sound as "Perhaps the best doom metal album of 2020".

In 2020, Dunn opened the studio Circular Ruin, along with Ben Greenberg and Arjan Miranda. Circular Ruin took its name after the eponymous Jorge Luis Borges story in which a surreal plot is revealed to have been dreamed. Dunn likens the act of music making to mystical themes within the Borges text; the group founded the studio as an invocation of a collective, metaphysical, and medicinal approach to music. Signifying this influence, the studio's logo is derived from the Jungian maze.

Dunn and Ben Greenberg co-produced Algiers’ third studio album There Is No Year, issued by Matador Records in 2020. AllMusic described the record as “[...] extend[ing] the reach of their previous outings while offering a more strategically articulated, disciplined musicality without sacrificing their core sound or blunting their emotional impact.”

Dunn produced Zola Jesus’ sixth studio album Arkhon, issued by Sacred Bones in 2022. The record featured drums by Matt Chamberlain, and was hailed by Pitchfork as “[...]a pleasantly shapeless record [... that] widens the scope of her music while retaining its primal, gothic spirit.”

Dunn produced Silver Haze, the first full-length record from SQÜRL (Jim Jarmusch and Carter Logan), featuring performances from Charlotte Gainsbourg, Anika, and Mark Ribot. It will be released on May 5, 2023 by Sacred Bones.

Danny Elfman's 2020 single "Happy," his first solo pop single in nearly forty years, featured mixing by Dunn, as well as additional synth design.

=== Master Musicians of Bukkake ===
In addition to his work as a producer and engineer, Dunn is a keyboardist and founding member of the experimental group, Master Musicians of Bukkake. Dunn described the project as "a way to escape how I make music in the studio when I'm doing records for people".

In 2004, alongside his bandmates, Dunn wrote, arranged and produced the first Master Musicians of Bukkake record, The Visible Sign of the Invisible Order. The album was released on Sun City Girls' label, Abduction Records and featured the musicians Eryn Young (vocals), James Davis, Don McGreevy, Alan Bishop, Charlie Gocher, and John Schuller.

=== Film and television ===
In the 2010s, Dunn's work as a record producer evolved into projects in film, including production and engineering, as well as composing and performance.

Dunn recorded several songs with Sun City Girls for the soundtrack to the 2007 Harmony Korine film Mister Lonely.

In 2014, Dunn worked with Oren Ambarchi and Stephen O’Malley on scoring the short film Kairos by the Belgian filmmaker Alexis Destoop. It was released as Shade Themes from Kairos on Drag City in 2014.

Dunn co-produced and composed additional music for the score to the Panos Cosmatos film Mandy, along with the late Jóhann Jóhannsson in 2018. The score won multiple awards for "Best Original Score" at the 2019 Austin Film Critics Association Awards, the 2019 Fangoria Chain Saw Awards, and the 2018 Seattle Film Critics Society Awards; it also received multiple nominations for "Best Original Score" at the 2018 Chicago Film Critics Association Awards and the 2018 Hollywood Music in Media Awards.

In 2021, Dunn produced Robert Aiki Aubrey Lowe’s score to the Nia DaCosta film Candyman, with a screenplay by Jordan Peele. The score made the shortlist for the 2022 Academy Awards in the category of Best Original Score.

In 2022, along with Úlfur Hansson, Dunn was the principal composer of the score for the television show Salvage Marines. In the same year, Dunn and Hansson composed the score for The Way of the Psychonaut, a documentary about the life and work of Stanislav Grof, founder of transpersonal psychology.

Dunn was the musical director and producer of Daniel Lopatin’s score to The Viewing, the 2022 Panos Cosmatos episode of Guillermo Del Toro's Cabinet of Curiosities. Under Lopatin's executive production at Circular Ruin Studio, Dunn contributed additional synthesizer arrangements.

In 2022, Dunn produced Robert Ouyang Rusli's score for Julio Torres’ debut film Problemista, produced by Emma Stone, starring Tilda Swinton, and released by A24 in 2023.

With Daniel Lopatin as the executive producer, Dunn produced the score for the Showtime series The Curse, co-created by Nathan Fielder and Benny Safdie. The score was composed by jazz keyboardist John Medeski.

Dunn produced the Khu.éex’ score for the documentary on the life and work of Preston Singletary.

== Style ==
When being offered to produce someone, Dunn prefers "people to send the roughest demos possible rather than more elaborate ones. And I try to see if it's music that I – or my aesthetics – can work with. Like, with their vision, and the end goal". He also pointed out that "people themselves are a really big thing for me. I just try to find people that you can spend ten days with in a small room, still enjoy each other's music and company, and be collaborative". As a musician, Dunn described himself "as an arranger in the studio. (...) You have to think several steps ahead as a musician – tuning, performance, rhythm – you have to think about all these layers of how sounds work".

On several occasions, Dunn has expressed a preference for the use of analog recording equipment: "I'm not a huge fan of the predictability of digitally processed music. But when you combine it with analog, you can get a cool medium. I rarely mix in the box [i.e., entirely digitally], or use Pro Tools [a common computerized editing software] to do mixes. Everything is hands-on with faders. I'll start with tape—if it's a rock band, recording to 16-track two-inch tape. It's a beautiful sound you don't hear much of any more. I like the hybrid approach with the soul of tape and the precision of digital."

Dunn credits his open approach in the studio as being influenced by his studies of Buddhism and psychology.

== Discography ==
Solo studio albums

- Beloved (Figureight, 2018)

Collaborative albums

- Lesli Dalaba/Bill Horist/Randall Dunn, Zahir (Endless Records, 2001)
- Oren Ambarchi/Stephen O'Malley/Randall Dunn, Shade Themes From Kairos (Drag City, 2014)

As Master Musicians of Bukkake

- The Visible Sign of the Invisible Order (Abduction, 2004)
- Totem One (Conspiracy Records, 2009)
- Totem Two (Important Records, 2010)
- Totem Three (Important Records, 2011)
- Far West (Important Records, 2013)
- Far West Quad Cult (Important Records, 2015)

== Production credits ==
- John Schuller, Lesser Angel of Failure (World Misery Recordings, 2002)
- Mark Schlipper, There's Heaven in Water (all the transients, 2004)
- Earth, Hex; Or Printing in the Infernal Method (Southern Lord, 2005)
- Kinski, Alpine Static (Sub Pop, 2005)
- Asva, Futurist's Against The Ocean (Web of Mimicry, 2005)
- Sunn O))) & Earth, Angel Coma (Southern Lord, 2006)
- Earth, Hibernaculum (Southern Lord, 2007)
- Jesse Sykes & The Sweet Hereafter, Like, Love, Lust & The Ocean Halls of the Soul (Fargo Records, 2007)
- Kinski, Down Below It's Chaos (Sub Pop, 2007)
- Wolves in the Throne Room, Two Hunters (Southern Lord, 2007)
- Lesbian, Power Hôr (Holy Mountain, 2007)
- Tartar Lamb, Sixty Metonymies (Ice Level Music, 2007)
- Asva, What You Don't Know Is Frontier (Southern Records, 2008)
- Kayo Dot, Blue Lambency Downward (Hydra Head Records, 2008)
- Earth, The Bees Made Honey in the Lion's Skull (Southern Lord, 2008)
- Earth & Sir Richard Bishop, The Peacock Angels Lament/Narasimha (Southern Lord, 2008)
- Six Organs of Admittance, Luminous Night (Drag City, 2009)
- Sunn O))), Monoliths & Dimensions (Southern Lord, 2009)
- Wolves in the Throne Room, Black Cascade (Southern Lord, 2009)
- Black Mountain, Wilderness Heart (Jagjaguwar, 2010)
- Kayo Dot, Coyote (Hydra Head Records, 2010)
- The Cave Singers, No Witch (Jagjaguwar, 2011)
- Mamiffer, Mare Decendrii (SIGE, 2011)
- Wolves in the Throne Room, Celestial Lineage (Southern Lord, 2011)
- Stephen O'Malley & Steve Noble, St. Francis Duo (Bo'Weavil Recordings, 2012)
- Björk & Omar Souleyman, Bastards (One Little Indian, 2012)
- Rose Windows, The Sun Dogs (Sub Pop, 2013)
- Kinski, Cosy Moments (Kill Rock Stars, 2013)
- Splashgirl, Field Day Rituals (Hubro, 2013)
- Akron/Family, Sub Verses (Dead Oceans, 2013)
- Kayo Dot, Hubardo (Ice Level Music, 2013)
- Midday Veil, ’’The Current'’ (Translinguistic Other, 2013)
- Marissa Nadler, July (Sacred Bones Records, 2014)
- Wolves in the Throne Room, Celestite (Artemisia Records, 2014)
- Oren Ambarchi, Quixotism (Editions Mego, 2014)
- Mamiffer, Statu Nascendi (SIGE, 2014)
- John Zorn & Eyvind Kang, Alastor: Book of Angels Volume 21 (Tzadik, 2014)
- Rose Windows, Rose Windows (Sub Pop, 2015)
- Splashgirl, Hibernation (Hubro, 2015)
- Sunn O))), Kannon (Southern Lord, 2015)
- Daughn Gibson, Carnation (Sub Pop, 2015)
- Steve Von Till, A Life Unto Itself (Neurot Recordings, 2015)
- Midday Veil, ’’This Wilderness'’ (Beyond Beyond is Beyond, 2015)
- Thurston Moore, Rock n Roll Consciousness (Virgin Music, 2017)
- Mamiffer, The World Unseen (SIGE, 2016)
- Lesbian, Hallucinogenesis (Translation Loss Records, 2016)
- Black Mountain, IV (Jagjaguwar, 2016)
- Headwaves, Self-Titled (Self-released, 2016)
- Khu.éex’,They Forgot They Survived (Self-released, 2016)
- The Cave Singers, Banshee (Jagjaguwar, 2016)
- Ash Borer, The Irrepassable Gate (Profound Lore Records, 2016)
- Marissa Nadler, Strangers (Sacred Bones, 2016)
- Sort Sol, Stor Langsom Stjerne (Sony Music, 2017)
- Myrkur, Mareridt (Relapse Records, 2017)
- Anna von Hausswolff, Dead Magic (City Slang, 2018)
- Cloud Nothings, Last Burning Building (Carpark, 2018)
- Mandy, Original Soundtrack (Lakeshore Records, 2018)
- Newaxeyes, ’’Black Fax'’ (Important, 2018)
- Khu.éex', HEEN (Self-released, 2019)
- Algiers, There is No Year (Matador, 2020)
- Pallbearer, Forgotten Days (Nuclear Blast, 2020)
- Khu.éex',WOOCH (Self-released, 2021)
- Red Ribbon, Planet X (Danger Collective, 2021)
- Candyman, Original Soundtrack (Waxwork Records, 2021)
- Zola Jesus, Arkhon (Sacred Bones, 2022)
- Salvage Marines,Original Music (Showtime, 2022)
- The Way of the Psychonaut, Original Soundtrack (2022)
- The Viewing, Original Soundtrack (Netflix, 2022)
- SQÜRL, Silver Haze (Sacred Bones, 2023)
- Problemista, Original Soundtrack (A24, 2023)
- The Curse, Original Soundtrack (Showtime, 2023)
