= Live at Roadburn 2018 =

2020 live album by Zola Jesus

Live album by Zola Jesus
- Released: May 1, 2020
- Recorded: April 21, 2018
- Venue: Roadburn Festival, Netherlands
- Genre: Electronic; gothic rock; indie rock
- Length: 54:30
- Label: Sacred Bones

Zola Jesus chronology
Okovi (2017)	Live at Roadburn 2018 (2020)

Live at Roadburn 2018 is the first live album by American singer-songwriter Zola Jesus, recorded at the 2018 Roadburn Festival in Tilburg, Netherlands. It was made available to stream and purchase via Bandcamp on May 1, 2020, before expanding to other digital platforms on May 8, 2020. It is scheduled to be released in physical formats–including several variations of limited edition vinyl, as well as compact disc–on June 26, 2020, by Sacred Bones Records.

== Recording ==
The album was recorded April 21, 2018 at the 2018 Roadburn Festival after Zola Jesus was invited to perform that as part of a day curated by Jacob Bannon of the band Converge.

== Release and formats ==
On May 2, 2020, the album was made available to purchase and stream digitally via Bandcamp, before being made available on other digital formats on May 8, 2020

In the United States, the album will be released on June 26, 2020, as a limited double vinyl LP, featuring a black and white spatter pattern, as well as a CD version. In Europe, the album will be available as a double vinyl LP in four variations, each limited to 200 pressings. A digipak CD edition is also slated to be released, limited to 1000 pressings.

== Track listing ==
All tracks are written by Nika Danilova, except where noted.

No.	Title	Writer(s)	Length
1.	"Veka"		5:20
2.	"Soak"		3:54
3.	"Dangerous Days"		5:01
4.	"Hikikomori"		3:59
5.	"Witness"		5:27
6.	"Siphon"		4:00
7.	"Wiseblood"		4:52
8.	"Bound"		3:27
9.	"Remains"		5:22
10.	"Night"	Danilova; Mivos Quartet; J. G. Thirlwell	3:47
11.	"Vessel"	Danilova; Quartet; Thirlwell	5:04
12.	"Exhumed"		4:17
Total length:			54:30

== Personnel ==
Band members

- Nika Danilova – vocals, synthesizer
- Alex DeGroot – guitar, electronics
- Louise Woodward – viola

Technical

- Marcel van de Vondervoort – recording
- James Plotkin – mixing, mastering

Artwork

- Oejerum – front cover
- Maurice de Jong – sleeve design
