= Celestite (album) =

Studio album by Wolves in the Throne Room
- Released: July 8, 2014
- Recorded: 2012–2013
- Genres: Dark ambient, progressive electronic
- Length: 47:23
- Label: Artemisia Records

Wolves in the Throne Room chronology
Celestial Lineage (2011)	Celestite (2014)	Thrice Woven (2017)

Celestite is the fifth full-length studio album by American black metal band Wolves in the Throne Room. It was released through their own label Artemisia Records on July 8, 2014. The album explores the themes of the band's previous album Celestial Lineage through an experimental, drone-based dark ambient style, eschewing vocals and the black metal aggression which characterizes their other works.

== Track listing ==
No.	Title	Length
1.	"Turning Ever Towards the Sun"	12:43
2.	"Initiation at Neudeg Alm"	5:58
3.	"Bridge of Leaves"	5:08
4.	"Celestite Mirror"	14:32
5.	"Sleeping Golden Storm"	9:02

== Personnel ==
Adapted from the AllMusic credits.

- Aaron Weaver – synthesizers, guitars
- Nathan Weaver – synthesizers, guitars

=== Guest musicians ===
- Randall Dunn – synthesizers, H3000 sound design, electrical processing
- Timm Mason – serge modulator (all tracks)
- Steve Moore – French horn, trombone (on tracks: 1, 4, 5)
- Josiah Boothby – French horn, trombone (on tracks: 1, 4, 5)
- Mara Winter – flute (on tracks: 1, 4)
- Veronica Dye – flute (on tracks: 3, 5)

=== Production ===
- Produced By: Randall Dunn and Wolves in the Throne Room
- Recorded By: Randall Dunn at AVAST and Owl Lodge
- Additional Recording by: Aaron Weaver at Owl Lodge
- Mixed at AVAST by Randall Dunn
- Mastered by Jason Ward at Chicago Mastering Service
