= Malevolent Grain =

EP by Wolves in the Throne Room
- Released: February 17, 2009
- Genres: Black metal, dark ambient
- Length: 23:39
- Labels: Southern Lord, Conspiracy

Wolves in the Throne Room chronology
Live at Roadburn 2008 (2008)	Malevolent Grain (2009)	Black Cascade (2009)

Professional ratings
Review scores
Source	Rating
AllMusic	3/5 stars
Blabbermouth	8.5/10
Pitchfork	2.8/10

Malevolent Grain is an EP by Wolves in the Throne Room that precedes their third album Black Cascade. This is the first album to feature guitar by Will Lindsay from the now defunct Middian. Jamie Myers from the band Hammers of Misfortune also supplies guest vocals for the song "A Looming Resonance".

== Track listing ==
No.	Title	Length
1.	"A Looming Resonance"	13:01
2.	"Hate Crystal"	10:38
Total length:		23:39

== Personnel ==
Wolves in the Throne Room

- Nathan Weaver - lead vocals, guitar, bass guitar
- Aaron Weaver - drums
- Will Lindsay - guitar

Additional musicians

- Jamie Myers - female vocals on "A Looming Resonance"

Additional personnel

- Christophe Szpajdel – logo

== Release history ==
Region	Date	Label	Format	Catalog	Notes
United States	February 17, 2009	Southern Lord	Vinyl	LORD101	Black vinyl
United States	February 17, 2009	Southern Lord	Vinyl	LORD101	Forest green vinyl
United States	February 17, 2009	Southern Lord	Vinyl	LORD101	Gold vinyl
Belgium	February 2009	Conspiracy	Vinyl	core074	Picture disc, limited to 700
United States	March 4, 2009	Self released	CD	WITTR001	Digipak only available through the band site or at live shows
