= Live at Roadburn 2008 (Wolves in the Throne Room album) =

Live album by Wolves in the Throne Room
- Released: January 6, 2009 (LP/DVD); November 16, 2009 (CD/DVD)
- Recorded: April 19, 2008
- Genre: Black metal, dark ambient
- Label: Roadburn

Wolves in the Throne Room chronology
| Two Hunters (2007) | Live at Roadburn 2008 (2009) | Malevolent Grain (2009) |

Live at Roadburn 2008 is the first live album by American black metal band Wolves in the Throne Room. It was released in January 2009 on LP/DVD and later in November 2009 on CD/DVD.

== Track listing ==
Live at Roadburn 2008
| No. | Title | Length |
|---|---|---|
| 1. | "Vastness & Sorrow" | 10:30 |
| 2. | "Face in a Night Time Mirror Pt. 1" | 15:58 |
| 3. | "Cleansing" (DVD only) | 10:25 |
| 4. | "I Will Lay Down My Bones Among the Rocks and Roots" | 20:40 |

== Personnel ==
Wolves in the Throne Room

- Nathan Weaver - guitar, vocals
- Rick Dahlin - guitar
- Will Lindsay - bass
- Aaron Weaver - drums

Other

- Richard "Robotmonster" Schouten - cover art
- Marcel van de Vondervoort - mixing, mastering
- José Carlos Santos - photography (LP version)
- Afton Larsen - group photos (CD version)
- Carli Davidson - background photo (CD version)
- Christophe Szpajdel – logo

== Recording ==
The performance was recorded live at the Roadburn Festival, April 19, 2008 at 013, Tilburg, Netherlands. Mixed and mastered at Torture Garden Studio, Oss, Netherlands.

== Release ==
Roadburn Records released the album on January 6, 2009. Initially it was only available as an LP/DVD pack (RBR012) in a limited edition of 1000 copies (500 black, 150 gold, 150 yellow, and 200 unknown colours). Later that year, Roadburn released a CD/DVD edition (RBR011).
