= Conatus (album) =

Studio album by Zola Jesus
- Released: September 26, 2011
- Recorded: 2011
- Genre: Art pop; synth-pop; electronic
- Length: 40:06
- Label: Sacred Bones
- Producer: Nika Roza Danilova; Brian "Nudge" Foote

Zola Jesus chronology
Valusia (2010)	Conatus (2011)	Versions (2013)

Singles from Conatus
- 1. "Vessel" Released: 2011; 2. "Seekir" Released: 2011; 3. "In Your Nature" Released: February 21, 2012

Conatus is the third studio album by American singer Zola Jesus, released in the United Kingdom on September 26, 2011, and in the United States on October 4 by Sacred Bones Records. The album was produced by Brian "Nudge" Foote (Jackie-O Motherfucker, Cloudland Canyon) and Nika Roza Danilova herself.

== Background ==
Several critics noticed that the new album sounds different from Zola Jesus' earlier works. "I just wanted to try out new ways to produce and different ways to write. And with this new record it's a lot more stripped down and there are way more acoustic elements as opposed to no acoustic elements. [...] I just wanted more breathing room, so people could insert their own experiences into the song, their own feelings into the song, as opposed to me forcing it on them with the densest sound possible", Danilova explained. Speaking to Prefix Magazine after her performance at the Pitchfork Music Festival, she said she wanted the album to be a step forward. "[I]n doing that, there was so, so much trial and error and so much quitting music at the end of the day", she admitted. Danilova said that the title of the album (meaning "moving forward" in Latin) appeared before the work on it began. "I had it in mind beforehand because I knew that's what I was going through even before I sat down to work on the record, I was already going through that emotional process of trying to push myself", she said.

Answering the question about how and why the new album was different from her previous records, Danilova said:

It was the longest I've had to record an album, which was three [...] to five months. Which, to me, was way too much time and at the same time not enough. But I added acoustic elements, like live drums and strings which was very new to me. Plus I worked with a producer for the first time, mixing the record and producing it, which I had never done before. [...] And just the way I wrote it was much different, because with everything I wrote, if it sounded too much like something I'd written before like something I'm used to writing, I'd throw away the song and start over.

Brian Foote, Danilova's friend, has been bought in when she realized she had too much of ideas to sort them out. "Some of them weren't really a good fit, as I found out during the process, and by the end I kind of realised that I needed someone to help me along the way. So, it made sense to ask Brian as he's a great friend of mine that also lives in Los Angeles and he has a great studio with lots of resources. He helped oversee the production of the record and made sure that everything was done on time and nothing was missed out during recording and it worked out just perfect", she said. It was easy for her to work with Foote who, understanding that she was a "control freak", tried to "step away a lot". Yet, he had a lot of "great suggestions about how to change little things to make them more effective", according to Danilova, and also let her use his "amazing synth collection" which helped the songs grow.

For the first time ever Danilova has brought in session musicians: Nick Johnson (drums, who is also a member of her live band), Sean McCann (viola, violin) and Ryan York (cello, double bass). "I can't play violin or cello or stand-up bass, or drums. I can play keyboards, kind of. So all the keyboard parts I wrote and played, and then I would send the string parts that I had wrote on the keyboard to the string players and they would just mimic that. Same with the drums. I try to do as much as possible, still, but I wish I could play drums", she explained.

== Style ==
Some critics mentioned Danilova's initial intention "to make a big sounding pop album", and the way she's "found that the music she was creating was expressing itself as something more introspective", as the work progressed. "Despite stepping away from the notion of making a pop album, 'In Your Nature' hints at where Conatus might have headed had Danilova's tendency to write songs that inhabit the darker end of the spectrum not come to the fore", according to musicOMH. Resident Advisor cited "Seekir" and "In Your Nature" as "prime examples of how she has quickly and impressively matured from bedroom industrial experimentalist to perverse yet universal synth-popper", while Anupa Mistry of Canadian magazine Now opined that on Conatus, Zola Jesus "reveals herself as an avant-gardist with pop ambition."

The Los Angeles Times also found "below the bleak, seasick surfaces" a "deeply romantic streak that complicates the idea of who or what Zola Jesus is", noting that "[i]t's this disarming sensuality that allowed Danilova to fit in alongside Beck and Mike Patton at a recent Serge Gainsbourg tribute at the Hollywood Bowl." Evan Hanlon of Dusted Magazine opined that "Seekir" "is the closest Zola Jesus gets to a club hit" and even draws parallels with Lady Gaga: "There is the singular, artistic persona that represents an entire project of identity. The moody drama that stems from this persona infused into each song. The challenge to popular music orthodoxy from within the system. And above all, the placement of a powerful operatic voice at the focal point, and in Nika Roza Danilova's case, the classical training that goes along with it." Now reviewer Anupa Mistry agreed, stating: "Like her prior work, the songs are thematically dark and diffuse, but the dancey impulses on 'Vessel' and 'Seekir' signal headier paths ahead. Could Zola Jesus be the inverse Lady Gaga?" Reef Younis, writing for Clash, remarked that "[s]tepping out of the shadows suits her after all."

Still, AllMusic's Heather Phares saw a lot of complexity on the album that "extends even to [the album's] relatively accessible moments, which inch closer to pop without actually delivering it". She also wrote that over the course of the album, Danilova "nods to goth, synth pop, industrial, and abstract electronica without pledging allegiance to any one style; she's forging her own path", presenting "fractured beats and electronics [...] alongside strings and other organic elements in a pristine studio setting." Ben Hewitt of The Quietus mentioned how prior to the album's release Zola Jesus "revealed that she'd immersed herself so deeply in its (typically cheery) themes of alienation and isolation that she became 'completely lost'", adding that "while the misery of Stridulum II was often delivered with the same subtlety as a Hammer Horror movie, Conatus is far more ambient and ethereal—and doubly eerie as a result." According to Consequence of Sound's Frank Mojica, "Rather than radically reinventing the sound from Danilova's second full-length, 2010's Stridulum II, Conatus comes across as a more fully realized Zola Jesus production. This album is elevating as well as moody, as it runs through various shades of both electronic and organic darkness. Although familiar by now, the Zola Jesus style has been refined enough so that it remains fresh and leaves the listener awaiting the next otherworldly journey." "Though some may miss the rough and raw approach of her last two EPs, it's refreshing and exciting to hear music that relies on bone-hard essence rather than gauzy trimmings to create an aura of mystery. There's a newfound sense of purpose, as if, having tested her abilities, Danilova now understands exactly what she's doing", according to Pitchfork.

Among other artists Conatus reviewers compared Zola Jesus to are Tori Amos, New Order, Patti Smith, Stevie Nicks, Throbbing Gristle, Elizabeth Fraser, Dead Can Dance and Siouxsie Sioux. In a broader sense, PopMatters' Matt James noticed similarities with the work of Edgar Allan Poe, Munch, Bresson, Francesca Woodman and Gorecki.

=== Vocal delivery ===
As with all of her previous releases, Zola Jesus's vocals and delivery in Conatus have been unanimously praised by critics. Frank Mojica of Consequence of Sound argued that "[s]ome singers are blessed with the rare sort of voice that's unmistakably theirs, and Nika Roza Danilova is one such artist. Under her stage name Zola Jesus, the opera-trained Danilova has paired vocals that are akin to a siren's call with neo-gothic synths that carry the listener to an often sinister land of mystery."

Heather Phares opined that "Danilova's throatily majestic voice" is "as unmistakable as ever. Her instrument is undeniably powerful, and more controlled here than it was before", but still demonstrates "remarkable rawness and vulnerability". Sam Shepherd wrote that "[h]er voice is so unique and haunting that it is instantly recognisable." Brian Howe of Pitchfork commented, "Whatever biosphere you choose to project on it [...], Danilova's voice remains fixed on a faraway horizon, receding as you approach. When she bursts into the foreground on 'Avalanche' and stays there for the remainder of the album, the impression of impassable distance lingers. This is partly because of the authority of Danilova's voice, and partly because the music gives nothing away, thrumming along with power that shades into ambivalence toward the shifting emotional register of the singing. The results are dramatic but never melodramatic, as Danilova maps the dimensions of her self-imprisonment with resolve."

== Critical reception ==
Professional ratings
Aggregate scores
Source	Rating
Metacritic	79/100
Review scores
Source	Rating
AllMusic	4/5 stars
The Guardian	3/5 stars
Los Angeles Times	3.5/4 stars
musicOMH	4/5 stars
NME	7/10
The Observer	3/5 stars
Pitchfork	7.7/10
PopMatters	8/10
Rolling Stone	3/5 stars
Spin	8/10

Upon its release, Conatus received positive reviews from most music critics. At Metacritic, which assigns a normalized rating out of 100 to reviews from mainstream critics, the album received an average score of 79, based on 35 reviews, which indicates "generally favorable reviews". Q magazine praised it as "a mind-blowing and powerfully emotional album", rating it 4/5. Sam Shepherd of musicOMH wrote, "More bare structurally, musically and emotionally than its predecessor, yet by the same token, fuller and more alive, [Conatus] is an amazing work that showcases a phenomenal talent and a unique voice." Mikael Wood of the Los Angeles Times gave Conatus a 3.5/4 rating, calling it a "thoroughly bewitching album", while Stephane Girard of Resident Advisor dubbed it "Zola Jesus' most gratifying offering so far", and The A.V. Club's Jason Heller agreed, stating that on Conatus, "she's made another bold step toward fully realizing her cyborg-like, post-goth opera." Pitchfork's Brian Howe viewed the album as a huge step forward as well, noting that "[m]ost traces of obscuring murk have burned away, so that every pock and ridge in the rugged, elemental music stands out distinctly. [...] Her bouts of nihilism feel nervier and more bracing in the unforgiving light of sonic clarity. The closer she gets, the more enigmatic she's revealed to be." Filter reviewer Laura Studarus referred to the album as a "textured collection of 11 tunes—all united with an innate sense of 'epicness.' Danilova's more-is-more mentality may be off-putting to some listeners (instrumental embellishments circle her swooping voice like auditory eyeliner), but it's executed with the utmost care."

Heather Phares of AllMusic expressed that "[w]hile Conatus isn't as direct as Stridulum, it's still some of her most satisfying work. This is music made in and for the darkest hours, and a striking portrait of the times when crisis and opportunity meet." Matt James of PopMatters described the album as "enchanting, exhausting, cathartic, borderline traumatic, and curiously beautiful to its dying breath", adding that "Conatus is an album rich with highlights. It's melodrama so operatic, everything's built to sound like the last song you'll ever hear." Jen Long of BBC Music felt that the album is "trademark Zola Jesus" which hasn't "taken any great strides away from the formula that's served its master so well to date" and, while the production has certainly taken a step up, the lyrical content of songs prove to be less memorable than the delivery. Long concluded: "This is a strong record, there's no doubting that—but it still feels like the best is yet to come from Danilova, which some may consider a disappointment now that she's three albums to the good." Evan Hanlon of Dusted Magazine thought that "[t]he lyrical content is largely superfluous, and despite the obvious upgrade in production and a newfound embrace of the spotlight, the program is very much the same." Praising "Vessel" and "Seekir" as the album's two most innovative tracks, Emily Mackay of NME concluded: "Mostly, though, Conatus gives you a more polished version of exactly what you'd want from a Zola Jesus album". The Observer's Kitty Empire found the album "very accomplished, but lacking in variety".

Stereogum placed the album at number 15 on its list of the "Top 50 albums of 2011".

== Track listing ==
All tracks are written by Zola Jesus.

Conatus track listing
No.	Title	Length
1.	"Swords"	1:03
2.	"Avalanche"	3:20
3.	"Vessel"	4:42
4.	"Hikikomori"	3:47
5.	"Ixode"	4:14
6.	"Seekir"	3:44
7.	"In Your Nature"	3:27
8.	"Lick the Palm of the Burning Handshake"	4:27
9.	"Shivers"	2:54
10.	"Skin"	4:21
11.	"Collapse"	4:07

Australian and iTunes bonus track
No.	Title	Length
12.	"Days Grow Older"	3:33

== Personnel ==
- Nika Roza Danilova – vocals, producer
- Josh Bonati – mastering
- Brandie Carlos – make-up
- Angel Ceballos – photography
- Brian Foote – producer, engineer, mixing
- Nick Johnson – drums
- Sean McCann – viola, violin
- Davey Riley – additional engineer
- Ryan York – cello, double bass

== Charts ==
Chart performance for Conatus
Chart (2011)	Peak position
French Albums (SNEP)	158
UK Albums (OCC)	144
UK Independent Albums (OCC)	22
US Billboard 200	175
US Heatseekers Albums (Billboard)	7
US Independent Albums (Billboard)	30
US Top Dance Albums (Billboard)	6
