= Two Hunters =

Studio album by Wolves in the Throne Room
- Released: September 25, 2007
- Recorded: London Bridge Studio and Aleph Studio in the Pacific Northwest
- Genre: Black metal, dark ambient, post-metal
- Length: 46:21 (CD); 68:56 (LP)
- Label: Southern Lord Records (SUNN83)
- Producer: Randall Dunn, Wolves in the Throne Room

Wolves in the Throne Room chronology
| Diadem of 12 Stars (2006) | Two Hunters (2007) | Live at Roadburn 2008 (2008) |

Professional ratings
Review scores
| Source | Rating |
|---|---|
| AllMusic | 3.5/5 stars |
| Pitchfork | 7.9/10 |
| Rock Sound | 9/10 |

Two Hunters is the second album by black metal band Wolves in the Throne Room and their debut album on Southern Lord Records. The band made minimal use of any digital effects or manipulation in the recording process. The vinyl version includes an extended version of "Cleansing" (which is about 6 minutes longer) and a previously unreleased track "To Reveal". Two Hunters was critically acclaimed and succeeded in putting the band at the forefront of the North American black metal scene. The Daymare Recordings release also contains their 2005 demo on a second disk.

== Track listing ==
=== Original issue ===
| No. | Title | Length |
|---|---|---|
| 1. | "Dea Artio" (instrumental) | 5:58 |
| 2. | "Vastness and Sorrow" | 12:12 |
| 3. | "Cleansing" | 9:55 |
| 4. | "I Will Lay Down My Bones Among the Rocks and Roots" | 18:16 |

=== Double vinyl track listing ===
Side one
| No. | Title | Length |
|---|---|---|
| 1. | "Dea Artio" | 5:58 |
| 2. | "Vastness and Sorrow" | 12:12 |

Side two
| No. | Title | Length |
|---|---|---|
| 1. | "Cleansing" | 15:51 |

Side three
| No. | Title | Length |
|---|---|---|
| 1. | "I Will Lay Down My Bones Among the Rocks and Roots" | 18:16 |

Side four
| No. | Title | Length |
|---|---|---|
| 1. | "To Reveal" | 16:39 |

== Personnel ==
Wolves in the Throne Room

- Nathan Weaver – guitar, vocals
- Aaron Weaver – drums
- Rick Dahlin – guitar, vocals

Additional musicians

- Jessika Kenney – vocals on tracks 3 and 4

Production

- Wolves in the Throne Room – production
- Randall Dunn – production, engineering, mixing
- Mell Dettmer – engineering, mixing, mastering
- Christophe Szpajdel – logo
