= Stridulum (EP) =

EP by Zola Jesus
- Released: March 9, 2010
- Length: 20:45
- Label: Sacred Bones

Zola Jesus chronology
The Spoils (2009)	Stridulum (2010)	Stridulum II (2010)

Stridulum is the sixth release and second EP by American singer-songwriter Zola Jesus, released on March 9, 2010, by Sacred Bones Records. It was expanded into the full-length album Stridulum II, released later in 2010.

In August 2017, the EP was reissued into an LP, which complies the EPs Valusia and Stridulum.

== History ==
With its more sophisticated sound, Stridulum was still self-recorded over two hurried weeks between college semesters in Danilova's bedroom, rushed so it could be released in time for the 2010 South by Southwest festival. No assistants were involved, except for friend Alex DeGroot who helped to record her vocals and mix the songs. "I would sit at my bed with my synths, make a beat and then layer and layer over it, then fall asleep right next to my synth and do it again the next morning", Zola Jesus said in an interview. In an interview with music blog Rock of the Arts she said:

The EP was a really rushed process. I had about only a month to conceptualize, write, and record everything, since we wanted it to be out before SXSW. I had to put a lot of faith in instinct and not over-think so much. But in the end I believe it worked for the best. It's really a very genuine, innate piece of work. My grandfather passed away while I was making this record so that also played a part in the feel of the songs.

The EP's subject matter was described as 'macabre'; Danilova, who rejects the "goth" label, often uses themes of death and the Apocalypse. "I just really like that desperation that comes with the end of the world, and the aesthetics of everything being chaos, and everyone just running around in anarchy and crying and throwing up over each other", she commented.

== Critical reception ==
Next to Zola Jesus' debut album, Stridulum was described as "an infinitely grander EP that rumbles in deference to The Cure's Pornography and suggests Björk or a moodier Bat for Lashes in its towering production". Pitchfork Media placed it at number 37 on its list "The Top 50 Albums of 2010".

== Track listing ==
All tracks are written by Zola Jesus, except where noted.

No.	Title	Length
1.	"Night"	3:37
2.	"Trust Me"	2:01
3.	"I Can't Stand"	4:10
4.	"Stridulum"	4:22
5.	"Run Me Out"	3:19
6.	"Manifest Destiny"	3:16

2017 re-issue
No.	Title	Length
1.	"Night"	3:37
2.	"Trust Me"	2:01
3.	"I Can't Stand"	4:10
4.	"Stridulum"	4:22
5.	"Run Me Out"	3:19
6.	"Manifest Destiny"	3:16
7.	"Poor Animal"	4:27
8.	"Tower"	3:58
9.	"Sea Talk"	5:03
10.	"Lightsick" (Danilova, Alex DeGroot)	4:11
