= Versions (Zola Jesus album) =

Compilation album by Zola Jesus
- Released: August 20, 2013
- Length: 41:04
- Label: Sacred Bones

Zola Jesus chronology
Conatus (2011)	Versions (2013)	Taiga (2014)

Singles from Versions
- 1. "Avalanche (Slow)" Released: June 25, 2013; 2. "Hikikomori" Released: August 26, 2013; 3. "Fall Back" Released: November 11, 2013

Professional ratings
Aggregate scores
Source	Rating
Metacritic	74/100
Review scores
Source	Rating
Allmusic	4/5 stars
The A.V. Club	(B)
Drowned in Sound	6/10 stars
musicOMH	4/5 stars
NME	(7/10)
Pitchfork	(7.6/10)
PopMatters	7/10 stars
Spin	8/10 stars

Versions is a compilation album by American singer-songwriter Zola Jesus. The album consists of remixes of tracks from her second and third albums as well as one previously unreleased track. It was released in August 2013 under Sacred Bones Records.

== Track listing ==
All music is composed by Zola Jesus, Mivos Quartet and J. G. Thirlwell.

No.	Title	Length
1.	"Avalanche (Slow)"	4:55
2.	"Fall Back"	4:27
3.	"Hikikomori"	3:42
4.	"Run Me Out"	3:42
5.	"Seekir"	3:31
6.	"Sea Talk"	5:01
7.	"Night"	3:24
8.	"In Your Nature"	3:24
9.	"Collapse"	4:07
10.	"Vessel"	4:51
