= Wolves in the Throne Room =

American black metal band

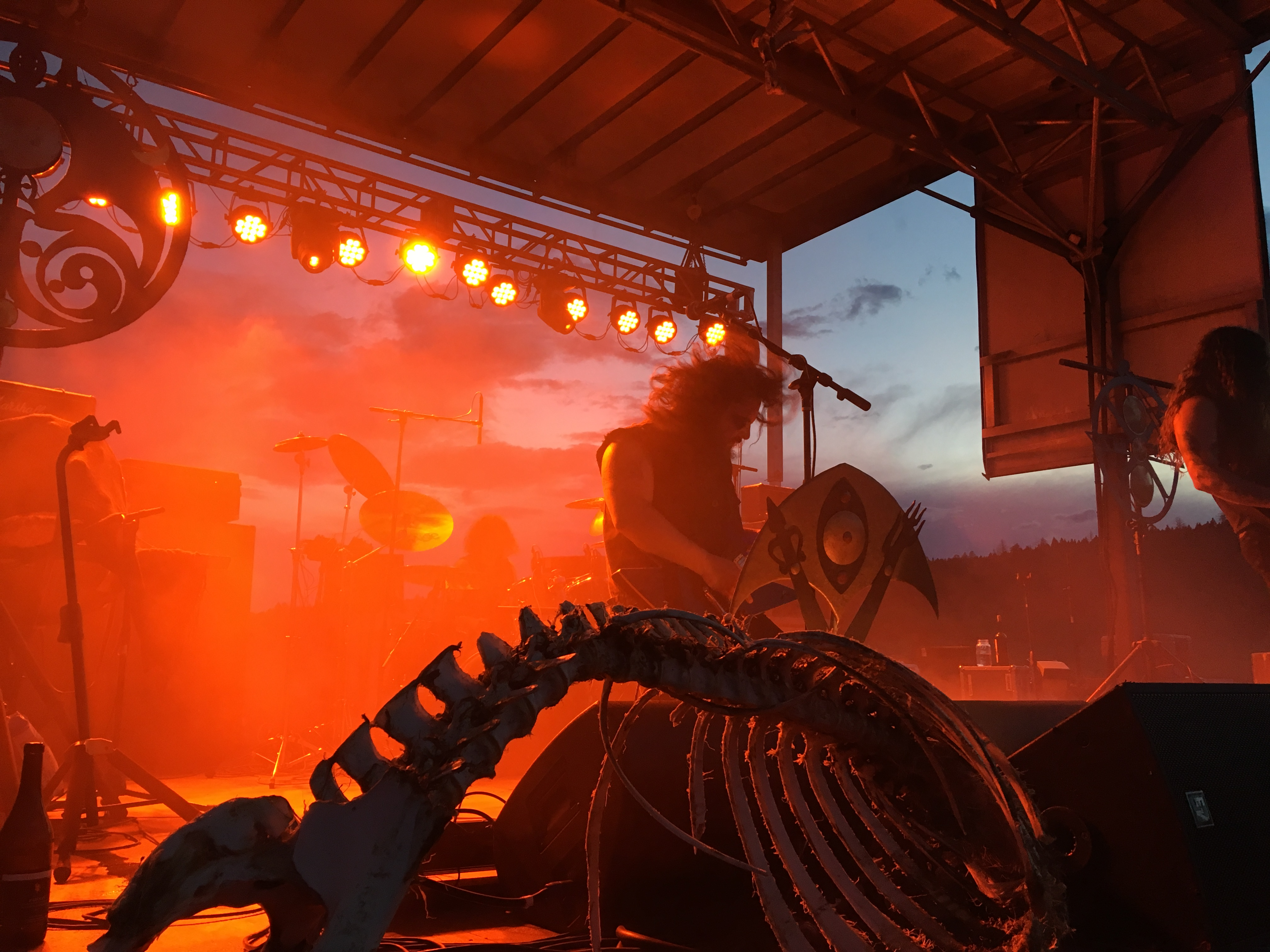
- Wolves in the Throne Room performing live at Fire in the Mountains Festival 2019

Background information
- Origin: Olympia, Washington, U.S.
- Genres: Atmospheric black metal; dark ambient
- Years active: 2002–present
- Labels: Century Media, Artemisia, Southern Lord, Relapse
- Members: Nathan Weaver; Aaron Weaver; Kody Keyworth
- Past members: Nick Paul; Richard Dahlen; Will Lindsay
- Website: wittr.com

Wolves in the Throne Room is an American black metal band formed in 2002 in Olympia, Washington, by brothers Aaron and Nathan Weaver. They have released seven full-length albums, two live albums, and two EPs to date. They have stated one of the founding concepts of the band to be channeling the "energies of the Pacific Northwest's landscape" into musical form.

== History ==
=== Formation and Diadem of 12 Stars (2002–2006) ===
Brothers Aaron and Nathan Weaver formed the band in 2002. Their first practice took place in a falling-down cabin located on the then-abandoned and overgrown Calliope Farm, which they had recently moved to. Nathan met Nick Paul at a local party and the three began to write material for their first demo. At the time, Nick was heavily influenced by thrash metal, speed metal, and death metal, citing bands like Death and Bolt Thrower, as well as post-punk and gothic rock influences such as Swans, Siouxsie and the Banshees, and Fields of the Nephilim. Aaron and Nathan's musical style was more informed by crust, doom, Norwegian black metal and American black metal.

The band's first release was their 2004 demo, a black CD-R wrapped in fur with moss inside the lyric sheet. Nick Paul left the band soon after the first demo was recorded.

Richard Dalahn joined the band in early 2005. They then began working on material for a second demo, which would end up including 2 tracks off of their first studio album Diadem of 12 Stars.

Their debut full-length album Diadem of 12 Stars was released in 2006. Diadem was recorded with a budget of $1100 by Tim Green at Louder Studios in San Francisco. The band played shows on the way down to San Francisco from Olympia to raise money for the project and borrowed equipment from local band Ludicra.

Nathan had met singer Jamie Myers from the band Hammers of Misfortune at a squat show in Oakland on a previous tour and asked her to sing on the album. Jamie was nine months pregnant during recording of her vocal tracks.

The album attracted the attention of Southern Lord Records, who signed the band, reissuing it on vinyl.

The debut record received positive reviews, with Pitchfork stating that, "it's the inclusion of folk and goth that separates Wolves in the Throne Room from the pack, breaking up the madness with moments of poetic clarity."

=== Two Hunters and Black Cascade (2007–2010) ===
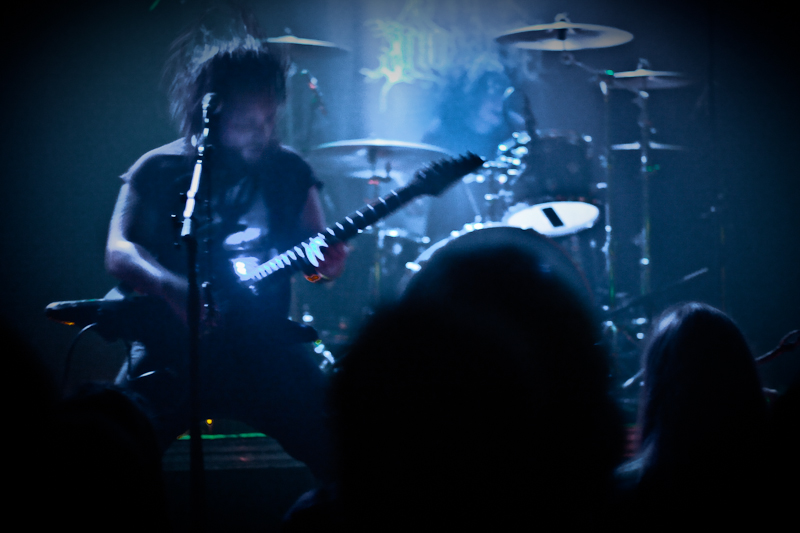
Live at De Helling, Utrecht in 2010

The band released their second full-length album Two Hunters in 2007, the first part of a trilogy of albums that was concluded with Celestial Lineage. Two Hunters was the first time the band worked with producer Randall Dunn, who went on to produce later releases Black Cascade and Celestial Lineage. During the Two Hunters sessions, the band began incorporating analog synthesizers such as the Korg Polysix and the Minimoog, which has become a crucial feature in the band's sound. Persian classical singer Jessika Kenney performed vocals on the songs "Cleansing" and "I Will Lay Down My Bones Among the Rocks and Roots."

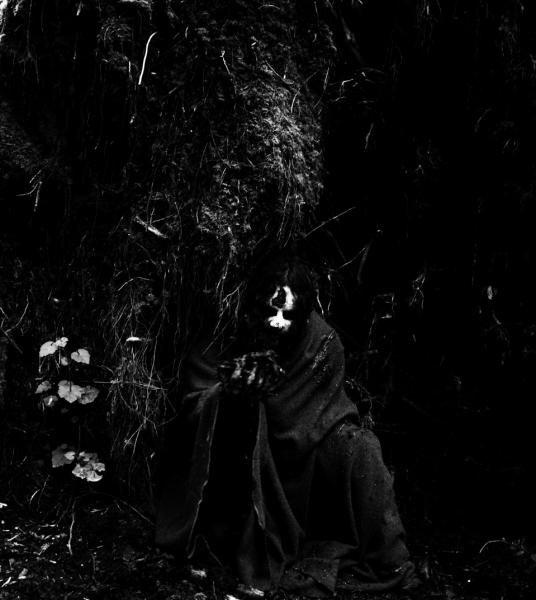
Two Hunters photo shoot 2006

Two Hunters received critical acclaim, with reviewers praising the band's subtle blending of conventional metal and post-rock genres.

Their third album Black Cascade was released in March 2009, again through Southern Lord. The album featured a much rawer and more stripped-down sound. After the release of Black Cascade, the band began a period of touring in the United States and Europe supporting Sunn O))), Earth, and Weedeater. The band played at both 2008 and 2009 Roadburn Festivals, Hellfest, Graspop, and Roskilde. Roadburn released a Live at Roadburn 2008 album in early 2009.

Wolves in the Throne Room were chosen by Godspeed You! Black Emperor for the 2010 All Tomorrow's Parties festival held in Minehead, UK.

=== Celestial Lineage, Celestite (2011–2016) ===
The band released their fourth full-length album Celestial Lineage on September 13, 2011, again produced by Randall Dunn. This record was the first that the band wrote and recorded as a two-piece.

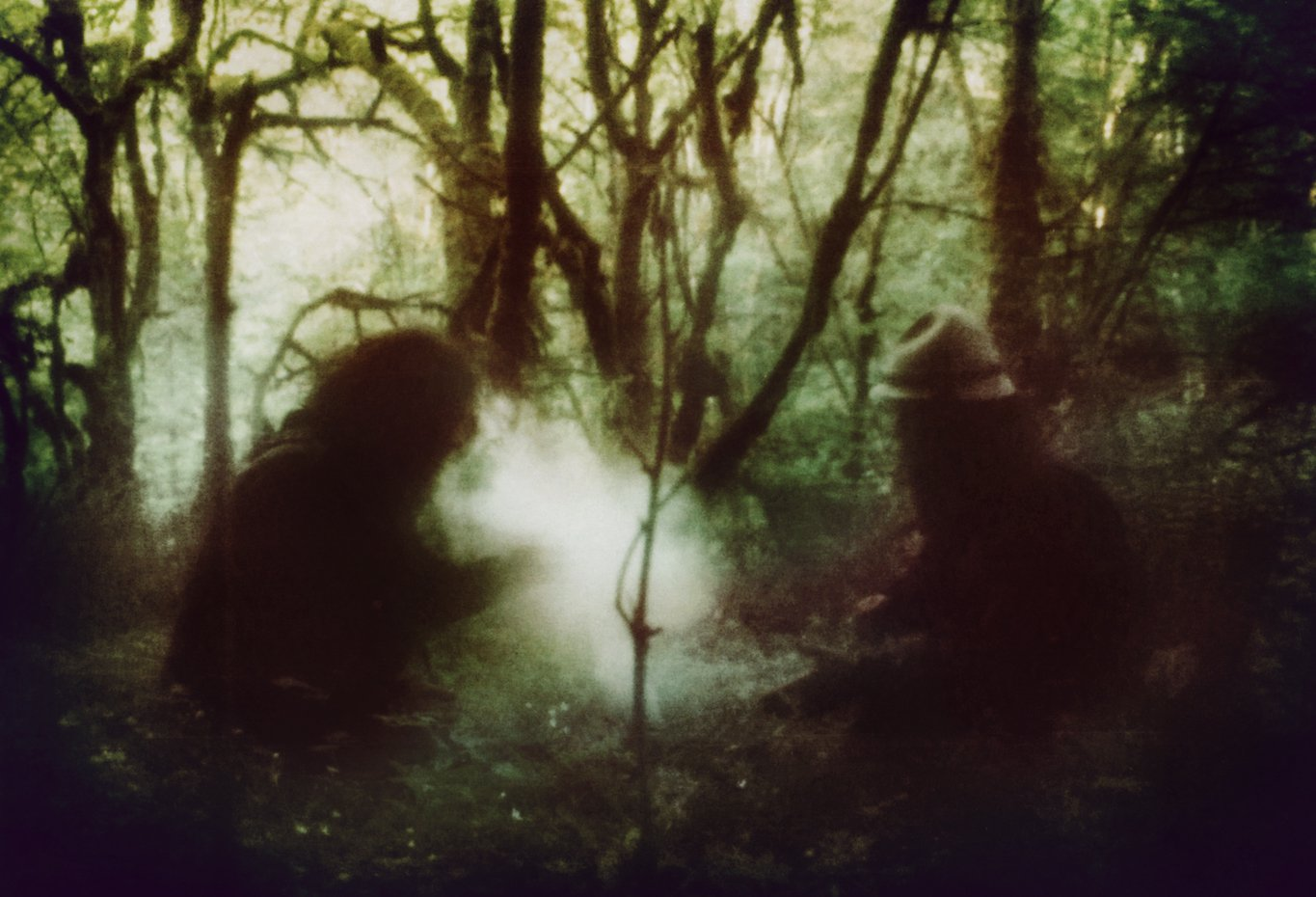
Celestial Lineage 2011

Music critic Brandon Stosuy described Celestial Lineage as "American black metal's idiosyncratic defining record of 2011". AllMusic's Eduardo Rivadavia argued that the album married the differing sounds of the two previous albums, "resulting in their most refined and confident outing to date."

In January 2014, it was announced that a 'companion album' to the opus Celestial Lineage was set to be released, entitled Celestite. Celestite was released in North America on Artemisia Records on July 8, 2014, and was described as an experimental extension on musical themes explored in their previous album Celestial Lineage.

Daniel Ross of The Quietus described Celestite as a departure from the band's "plectrum-annihilating assault" and praised the band's ability to act as "enablers of specific atmospheres, able to handhold a listener through incredibly dense forest in very low light."

=== Thrice Woven (2016–2020) ===
In 2015, the band began work on a new record, under the title Thrice Woven. Initially set for release on September 22, 2017, it was released three days earlier on September 19. Thrice Woven received positive reviews from critics. Metal Hammer Magazine stating "They've returned with full force...a celebration of the visceral and elemental... It's an absolute pleasure to have them back again".

In June 2016, the band remastered and reissued their first album Diadem of 12 Stars, and announced a North American tour.

In June 2018 WITTR won the award for Best Underground Band at Metal Hammer Magazine's 2018 Golden Gods Awards in London.

The band toured regularly in support of Thrice Woven including a co-headline outing with Norway's Enslaved on the 2018 Decibel Magazine Tour, and as support for Behemoth and At the Gates for 10 weeks in the US and Europe as part of Ecclesia Diabolica

In 2019, the band signed a record deal with Century Media records who will be releasing their next album in 2020/2021.

Wolves in the Throne Room supported bands Dimmu Borgir and Amorphis during their European tour in January 2020.

=== Primordial Arcana, Crypt of Ancestral Knowledge and Estuary (2021–present) ===
On June 10, 2021, the band released a new single, "Mountain Magick", and announced their upcoming seventh album, Primordial Arcana, which was released on August 20.

On August 16, 2023, the band released a new single, "Twin Mouthed Spring", and announced their upcoming EP, Crypt of Ancestral Knowledge, due for release on September 29.

On August 20, 2026, the band announced their eighth album, Estuary, which is set for release on October 23. The album's first single, "Ghosts Among the Obelisks", was also released.

== Musical style and live performances ==
The band's music has been described as "atmospheric black metal" and "Cascadian black metal". They have also been considered significant to post-metal for their combination of "ambience and violence" to create "emotionally impacting" music, especially on their 2007 sophomore album Two Hunters.

Wolves in the Throne Room has not incorporated most of the traditional traits of black metal such as corpse paint, the use of pseudonyms and Satanic imagery. Member Aaron Weaver has said, "Wolves in the Throne Room is not black metal, or, more accurately, we play black metal on our own terms, for our own reasons." And unlike most modern metal bands, Wolves in the Throne Room always use vintage amplifiers and recording equipment.

Aaron Weaver has also described their music as "striving to operate on the mythic level", commenting that "I think there's this sense that we've lost something and we can't have it back. And maybe it's not something we ever wanted to begin with. That sense of despair and loss and you don't even know what you lost. That's one of the central themes in black metal and that runs through our records as well." He went on to add that one of the central ideals of the band is "the idea of uncovering the occult or the spiritual or the energetic reality of place. Being deeply connected to a place and creating music and art that rises up out of a landscape."

Wolves in the Throne Room's sound is influenced by Scandinavian black metal. Additionally, Wolves in the Throne Room has often cited American band Neurosis as a key inspiration because their music "operates on a deep and intense mythic level". They have also mentioned synthesizer artists like Popol Vuh as an influence.

Wolves in the Throne Room prefer their live concerts to be firelit, whether it be performing outdoors or in an indoor venue. The band also does not permit flash photography at their shows.

== Members ==
Current members

- Nathan Weaver – lead vocals, guitar (2002–present)
- Aaron Weaver – drums, bass, synthesizer (2002–present)
- Kody Keyworth – guitar, backing vocals (2017–present)

Current session/touring musicians

- Galen Baudhuin – bass, backing vocals (2019–present)

Former members

- Nick Paul – guitar (2002–2004)
- Richard Dahlen – guitar (2005–2007)
- Will Lindsay – guitar, bass, backing vocals (2008–2009)

Former touring musicians

- Will Lindsay – bass (2008)
- Ross Sewage – bass (2008, 2009)
- Oscar Sparbell – bass (2009)

Former session musicians

- Jamie Myers – vocals (Diadem of 12 Stars, Malevolent Grain)
- Jessika Kenney – vocals (Two Hunters, Celestial Lineage)

== Discography ==
Studio albums

- Diadem of 12 Stars (2006, Vendlus)
- Two Hunters (2007, Southern Lord)
- Black Cascade (2009, Southern Lord)
- Celestial Lineage (2011, Southern Lord)
- Celestite (2014, Artemisia Records)
- Thrice Woven (2017, Artemisia Records)
- Primordial Arcana (2021, Relapse Records)
- Estuary (2026, Relapse Records)

EPs

- Malevolent Grain (2009, Southern Lord)
- Crypt of Ancestral Knowledge (2023, Relapse Records)

Live albums

- Live at Roadburn 2008 (2009, Roadburn)
- BBC Session 2011 Anno Domini (2013, Southern Lord)
- Turning Ever Towards The Sun - Live At Neudegg Alm (2014, Funkenflug Recordings)
- Live at the Bell House 9.12.11 (2015, Saint Roch Recordings)

Demos

- Wolves in the Throne Room (2004, independent)
- 2005 Demo (2005, Ván Records)
