= Rose Windows =

American psychedelic rock band

- Origin: Seattle, Washington, U.S.
- Genres: Psychedelic rock, Experimental rock
- Years active: 2010-2015
- Label: Sub Pop
- Past members: Chris Cheveyo; Rabia Shaheen Qazi; David Davila; Nils Petersen; Pat Schowe; Richie Rekow; Veronica Dye
- Website: www.subpop.com/artists/rose_windows

Rose Windows was a seven-piece psychedelic rock band based in Seattle, Washington.

== The Sun Dogs ==
Songwriter Chris Cheveyo assembled the band in Seattle's Central District in the fall of 2010. Rose Windows began making plans for their first album without being signed to any label yet. They sought out local producer Randall Dunn for his previous involvement the band Earth. Other local musicians were later brought on board to add harp, pedal steel, viola, and cello.

On June 25, 2013, Rose Windows released their debut album, The Sun Dogs, on Sub Pop Records.

Cheveyo has described The Sun Dogs as being about “the everyday blues that capitalism and its hit man, religion, bring on all of us.” More specifically, he saw The Sun Dogs as an acknowledgment of the circular nature of the rat race, learning to accept the evil in the world, taking joy wherever we can, and ultimately disavowing traditions of exploitation and violence.

The Sun Dogs contains elements of folk rock, psychedelic rock, Persian, Indian, and Eastern European music.

== Rose Windows ==
The recording sessions for the band's self-titled second album took place in Bogalusa, Louisiana in fall of 2014, with Randall Dunn returning as their producer. The album was released in January 2015, accompanied by the premiere of its first single, "Glory, Glory."

On March 30, 2015 an announcement on their Facebook page stated that the band would break up, and all future appearances were subsequently cancelled.

Rose Windows was released on Sub Pop on May 5, 2015.

== Members ==
- Chris Cheveyo – lead guitar/composer
- Rabia Shaheen Qazi – lead vocals
- Richie Rekow – bass/vocals
- Nils Petersen – rhythm guitar/vocals
- Pat Schowe – drums
- David Davila – piano/organ
- Veronica Dye – flute
