= Jessika Kenney =

American singer

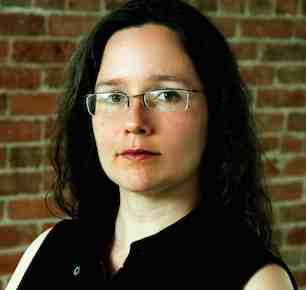

Background information
- Genres: Experimental
- Occupations: Composer; vocalist; teacher
- Website: jessikakenney.com

Jessika Kenney is an experimental vocalist, composer, and teacher.

Kenney sang the operatic prose for the world premiere of the experimental opera Kali in 2000 and performed at the Behnke Center for Contemporary Performance in Seattle. After the 2012 performance of Weathervane at Wellesley College, The Boston Globe called Kenney's singing "pure tones that emanate not just from the center of her being but seemingly from far back in time."

In 2015, Kenney created Anchor Zero, a 5-room solo exhibition including calligraphic scores, a bamboo Ka'aba in collaboration with Otong Durahim, and a 3 channel video/12 channel audio installation, at the Frye Art Museum. The Seattle Times described her exhibit as being like a "cavern filled with disembodied voices and spooky ambient sounds."

In 2018, the American composer of experimental music Alvin Lucier invited Kenney to sing the vocals on his reworking of the Orpheus and Eurydice myth "So You (Hermes/Orpheus/Eurydice)".

Her husband and musical partner is violinist Eyvind Kang.

== Discography ==
- So You...(Hermes, Orpheus, Euridyce) [Black Truffle] (2018)
- Atria [SIGE Records] (2015)
- Harrison: Scenes from Cavafy; Piano Concerto with Gamelan; A Soedjamako Set (vocals), [New World] (2011).
- Æstuarium (with Eyvind Kang) [Ideologic Organ] (2005)
- The Face of the Earth (with Eyvind Kang) [Ideologic Organ] (2013)
- At Temple Gate (with Eyvind Kang) [Weyrd Son Records WYS-009] (2014)

=== Featured ===
- Wolves in the Throne Room - Celestial Lineage (2011).
- Sunn O))) - Monoliths and Dimensions (2009).
- Hossein Omoumi - "Ava-ye Bahar" (Voices of Spring) Haft Dastgah (2008)
- Avey Tare - Eucalyptus (2017).
- Kayo Dot - "Hubardo" (2013).
