= Taiga (Zola Jesus album) =

Studio album by Zola Jesus
- Released: October 6, 2014
- Genre: Synth-pop
- Length: 42:36
- Label: Mute
- Producers: Nika Roza Danilova; Dean Hurley

Zola Jesus chronology
Versions (2013)	Taiga (2014)	Okovi (2017)

Singles from Taiga
- 1. "Dangerous Days" Released: June 23, 2014; 2. "Go (Blank Sea)" Released: September 17, 2014; 3. "Hunger" Released: February 9, 2015; 4. "Nail" Released: September 18, 2015

Taiga is the fourth studio album by American singer-songwriter Zola Jesus. It was released on October 6, 2014 in the UK and EU and on October 7, 2014 in the US through Mute. The album was produced by Nika Roza Danilova and co-produced by Dean Hurley. It marks the first Zola Jesus record to be released through Mute Records. The album title Taiga is the Russian word for boreal forests. A music video was released for the album's first single "Dangerous Days". The music video was directed by Timothy Saccenti and filmed in Hoh Rainforest, Washington.

== Critical reception ==
Professional ratings
Aggregate scores
Source	Rating
Metacritic	66/100
Review scores
Source	Rating
AllMusic	3.5/5 stars
Consequence of Sound	C+
Exclaim!	7/10
MusicOMH	4/5 stars
NME	7/10
Pitchfork	5.9/10
PopMatters	6/10
Rolling Stone	2/5 stars

Upon its release, Taiga received generally positive reviews from music critics. The review aggregator website Metacritic assigns a "Metascore" to each album, which is based on the ratings and reviews of selected mainstream independent publications, and the release has a score of a 66 based on 21 selected critics, indicating "generally favorable reviews".

== Track listing ==
All tracks are written by Nika Roza Danilova.

No.	Title	Length
1.	"Taiga"	2:55
2.	"Dangerous Days"	4:29
3.	"Dust"	3:32
4.	"Hunger"	4:32
5.	"Go (Blank Sea)"	4:05
6.	"Ego"	2:49
7.	"Lawless"	5:15
8.	"Nail"	3:05
9.	"Long Way Down"	3:58
10.	"Hollow"	3:50
11.	"It’s Not Over"	4:05
Total length:		42:36

== Personnel ==
Credits adapted from liner notes.

Zola Jesus

- Nika Roza Danilova – vocals, synthesizer, programming, production, arrangement

Additional musicians

- Joe Exley – horn arrangement, tuba
- Kyra Sims – French horn
- Gabe Martin – flugelhorn, trumpet
- Garth Flowers – trumpet
- Andris Mattson – trumpet
- Erik Hughes – trombone
- Matt Melore – trombone
- James Rogers – trombone
- Drake Smith – trombone
- Kim Free – violin
- Gillian Rivers – violin
- Yuiko Kamakari – viola
- Justin Kantor – cello

Technical personnel

- Dean Hurley – production, engineering, mixing
- Chris Coady – additional production
- Brian Rosemeyer – additional engineering
- David Tolomei – additional engineering
- Blake Mares – mixing assistance
- Brian Lucey – mastering
- Caleb Braaten – art direction, design
- David Correll – art direction, design
- Julia Comita – cover, insert photography
- Jeff Elstone – back cover photography

== Charts ==
Chart	Peak position
UK Independent Albums (OCC)	48
US Heatseekers Albums (Billboard)	9
US Independent Albums (Billboard)	40
