= Diadem of 12 Stars =

Studio album by Wolves in the Throne Room
- Released: February 7, 2006
- Recorded: Louder Studios in San Francisco, California
- Genres: Black metal, folk metal
- Length: 60:39
- Label: Vendlus
- Producers: Wolves in the Throne Room, Tim Green

Wolves in the Throne Room chronology
Demo (2004)	Diadem of 12 Stars (2006)	Two Hunters (2007)

Professional ratings
Review scores
Source	Rating
Allmusic	4/5 stars
BestBlackMetalAlbums.com	(9.4/10)
Pitchfork	(7.7/10)
Sputnikmusic	4/5 stars

Diadem of 12 Stars is the debut studio album of black metal band Wolves in the Throne Room. It was this recording that caught the attention of Southern Lord Records, who subsequently signed the band in late 2006 and re-released the album on vinyl. It was subsequently re-issued in 2016 through the band's own imprint, Artemisia Records.

The album was co-produced and engineered by Tim Green, who was also a producer for Weakling.

In 2013, Decibel ranked Diadem of 12 Stars at number 62 on its list of the Top 100 Black Metal Albums of All Time.

== Track listing ==
No.	Title	Length
1.	"Queen of the Borrowed Light"	12:58
2.	"Face in a Night Time Mirror": I. "Part 1" (13:21); II. "Part 2" (13:58)"	27:19
3.	"(A Shimmering Radiance) Diadem of 12 Stars"	20:22
Total length:		60:39

== Personnel ==
Wolves in the Throne Room

- Nathan Weaver - guitar, vocals
- Aaron Weaver - drums
- Rick Dahlin - guitar, vocals

Additional musicians

- Jamie Myers (Hammers of Misfortune) - vocals on track 1, 2 and 4
- Dino Sommese (Dystopia, Asunder) - vocals on track 1 and 3

Production

- Produced by Tim Green and Wolves in the Throne Room
