= Okovi =

Studio album by Zola Jesus
- Released: September 8, 2017
- Genre: Goth-pop; dark wave
- Length: 39:59
- Label: Sacred Bones
- Producer: Zola Jesus; Alex DeGroot; James Kelly

Zola Jesus chronology
Taiga (2014)	Okovi (2017)	Okovi: Additions (2018)

Singles from Okovi
- 1. "Exhumed" Released: June 7, 2017; 2. "Soak" Released: July 11, 2017; 3. "Siphon" Released: August 29, 2017

Okovi (English: Shackles) is the fifth studio album by American singer-songwriter Zola Jesus. It was released on September 8, 2017 by Sacred Bones Records. The album was written in Danilova's hometown in Wisconsin, where she retreated after dealing with depression and dark times experienced by her close friends.

== Critical reception ==
Professional ratings
Aggregate scores
Source	Rating
Metacritic	79/100
Review scores
Source	Rating
AllMusic	4/5 stars
The A.V. Club	A−
Consequence of Sound	B+
Clash	9/10
DIY	3/5 stars
Drowned in Sound	7/10
MusicOMH	4/5 stars
The Observer	4/5 stars
Pitchfork	8.3/10
Under the Radar	8/10 stars

At Metacritic, which assigns a normalized rating out of 100 to reviews from mainstream publications, the album received an average score of 79, based on 25 reviews, indicating "generally favorable reviews". Emma Madden of Clash praised the album, saying "the production is absolutely masterful. The conviction is assured; the weightiest of subjects: that of 'life' and 'death' are tackled and shackled by Zola expertly." Pitchfork's Sasha Geffen said "Okovi showcases the searing, fully-formed music of Nika Danilova, an album of close personal experiences rendered into urgent goth-pop songs as emotional as they are necessary." AllMusic critic Heather Phares called it "a deeply comforting album," further stating: "Okovi is some of Zola Jesus' purest-sounding, most profound music in years." Emily Mackay of The Observer called it "an album to light the way through the darkest hours."

Writing for Drowned in Sound, Pieter J Macmillan said "Okovi won't topple Stridulum II as the most essential Zola Jesus record, but it's another excellent record that once again showcases a unique and powerful voice." Under the Radar's Billy Hamilton described the album as "a deeply emotive and enthralling journey." Lisa Wright of DIY wrote: "Heavy with feeling throughout, it makes for a record that's often a tough listen. But for cathartically allowing herself to tackle life's most difficult subjects, you've got to applaud her." Sam Shepherd of MusicOMH stated that "sometimes it sounds bleak, sometimes it sounds glorious, but it's in embracing the full gamut of life experience, as Zola Jesus does here that nothing becomes everything. The shackles might still be on, but this is the sound of an artist reveling in freedom."

Professional wrestler Megan Bayne uses the track "Exhumed" for her entrance music.

=== Accolades ===
Publication	Accolade	Rank	Ref.
Cosmopolitan	Best Albums of 2017	6	
Drowned in Sound	Favourite Albums of 2017	17	
Pitchfork	The 50 Best Albums of 2017	41	
PopMatters	The 60 Best Albums of 2017	4	
Stereogum	50 Best Albums of 2017	43	

== Track listing ==
All tracks are written by Nika Roza Danilova.

No.	Title	Length
1.	"Doma"	2:15
2.	"Exhumed"	3:45
3.	"Soak"	3:57
4.	"Ash to Bone"	2:07
5.	"Witness"	4:01
6.	"Siphon"	3:50
7.	"Veka"	5:13
8.	"Wiseblood"	4:39
9.	"NMO"	0:56
10.	"Remains"	4:26
11.	"Half Life"	4:49
Total length:		39:59

== Personnel ==
Credits adapted from the liner notes of Okovi.

- Zola Jesus – vocals, co-production
- Alex DeGroot – co-production, mixing
- James Kelly – co-production (track 6)
- Ted Byrnes – percussion
- Julia Sonmi Heglund – double bass
- Shannon Kennedy – cello, electronics
- Lauren Elizabeth Baba – viola
- Leah Zegar – violin
- Rachel Grace – violin
- Heba Kadry – mastering
- Jesse Draxler – artwork

== Charts ==
Chart (2017)	Peak position
US Dance/Electronic Albums (Billboard)	8
