= The Spoils (Zola Jesus album) =

Studio album by Zola Jesus
- Released: July 2009
- Label: Sacred Bones
- Producer: Zola Jesus

Zola Jesus chronology
Tsar Bomba (2009)	The Spoils (2009)	Stridulum (2010)

Singles from The Spoils
- 1. "Poor Sons" Released: July 21, 2009; 2. "The Way" Released: July 21, 2009; 3. "Dogs" Released: July 21, 2009; 4. "Soeur Sewer" Released: July 21, 2009; 5. "Odessa" Released: July 21, 2009

The Spoils is a debut full-length studio album by Nika Roza Danilova, better known as American singer-songwriter Zola Jesus, released in July 2009 on Sacred Bones Records. To the LP version's original 10 tracks the CD (15 tracks) adds five songs: two from "Soeur Sewer" and three from the "Poor Sons" 7-inch singles.

== History ==
The album, according to the sleeve note was "recorded in the womb of a Wisconsin winter, 2008/2009". Nika Rosa made it in her apartment and lo-fi standard of the sound had been criticized even by her parents. "They’re like ...why is the quality so bad? You need to get into a real studio!" she said in a Pitchfork interview.

=== Sound and structure ===
The album's sound had a lot to do with the environment, according to its author:

What I like is when sound textures interweave and some come in and out like waves. But I am not going to go ‘ocean’ because that doesn’t suit my whole Wisconsin perspective. I usually record in the winter because I am holed up. It's cold outside but warm inside with the heater and blankets. A lot of the songs are cold but in the coldness you find warmth. Winter has a lot to do with it. Being from the Midwest, you experience a lot of harsh climat. Living in the country, there are a lot of harsh realities that teach you how to deal with things.

Some argued that the inclusion of the two earlier singles' material illustrated the development of the Zola Jesus sound. "The earlier singles are dirtier, sexier, more intense... Her voice, really, is the soul and core of the music," and on The Spoils she used "more reverb and single vocal tracks. I've never observed the loss of warmth and charm when switching to digital recording from analogue more apparently than here," remarked a Brainwashed reviewer. "I love weird power electronics and industrial music, but then I also really love intensely powerful melodic songs. Something like a Ronettes song hits you in such a different way than noise stuff. For me, the ideal is bringing both the experimental and the pop music in," Zola Jesus commented, noting that percussion played an important role in the album's structure too. "I will always have intense beats and have an epic sound structure," the singer said, speaking toLA Record.

== Reception ==
According to The Quietus, The Spoils "unfurled an epic sort of gloom-pop deliberately tarnished with lo-fidelity scuzz, but songs like "Clay Bodies" rose above the rubble thanks to Nika's huge delivery, full-hearted and powerful in a way that that melds a familiar diva dynamic to an abrasiveness practiced by scream queens like Diamanda Galas and Lydia Lunch. The Spoils (quoting The Fact magazine) "saw her master a unique vocabulary of drones, cavernous acoustics and rich, anachronistic vocal timbres buried within a dense layer of lo-fi grain that suggested that Zola Jesus had very much found her voice." A Boomkat reviewer pointed to "doom ridden, barely decipherable lyrics and emaciated drum machines somewhere between Siouxsie Sioux and Cold Cave" as the album's sound main feature. "The effect is a windswept and romantic scene of pop emotions wrung with blood curdling howls, bristling with synth electrics and booming with Robin Guthrie-esque drums. If you're susceptible to the likes of Cold Cave, PJ Harvey and classic 4AD moods, this will put you in your place," the writer concluded.

According to Pitchfork, as compared to earlier singles and EPs (which were "promising, with an immediately identifiable aesthetic" but "pulled in a few different directions, between structure and atmosphere, or vulnerable longing and stark, theatrical wailing") The Spoils is "a potent mix of layered and otherworldly vocals, muddy electronics, and storefront-church keyboards", full of tension, dynamics and raw emotion. "Spoils is compelling throughout, but the peak comes much later in its runtime, with 'Smirenye' and especially 'Clay Bodies', argues the reviewer.

In 2026, Uncut ranked The Spils at number 129 on their list of "The 200 Greatest Goth Albums". The magazine called it an "immersive, intoxicating soundworld" and excellent debut for the artist, adding that the music is characterized by distorted electronic drums in "a howling reverb storm", maximised by the "desperate and emotional power of the songs".

== Track listing ==
No.	Title	Length
1.	"Six Feet (From My Baby)"	4:15
2.	"Crowns"	2:54
3.	"Sinfonia and the Shrew"	2:07
4.	"Sink the Dynasty"	3:20
5.	"Devil Take You"	3:52
6.	"Lullaby In Tongues"	1:15
7.	"Smirenye"	3:48
8.	"Clay Bodies"	4:55
9.	"In Hiding from the Crow"	2:00
10.	"Tell It to the Willow"	4:35
11.	"Soeur Sewer"	3:55
12.	"Odessa"	3:53
13.	"Poor Sons"	1:48
14.	"The Way"	3:41
15.	"Dog"	4:12

Tracks 11 and 12 were originally released as the "Soeur Sewer" 7" on Sacred Bones Records. Tracks 13 to 15 originally released as the Poor Sons 7" on Die Stasi Records.

== Credits ==
- Indra Dunis - artwork
