= Black Cascade =

Studio album by Wolves in the Throne Room
- Released: March 31, 2009
- Genres: Black metal, dark ambient
- Length: 49:58
- Label: Southern Lord (LORD103)
- Producers: Wolves in the Throne Room, Randall Dunn

Wolves in the Throne Room chronology
Malevolent Grain (2009)	Black Cascade (2009)	Celestial Lineage (2011)

Professional ratings
Review scores
Source	Rating
AllMusic	4/5 stars
The A.V. Club	(favorable)
Cosmos Gaming	(favorable)
Pitchfork	4.5/10
PopMatters	8/10
Revolver	4/4 stars

Black Cascade is the third full-length studio album by the American ambient black metal band Wolves in the Throne Room. It was released through Southern Lord Records on March 31, 2009, and in Japan by Daymare Records on May 5, 2009.

Track one shares its name with the painting "Wanderer above the Sea of Fog" by Caspar David Friedrich.

== Track listing ==
No.	Title	Length
1.	"Wanderer Above the Sea of Fog"	10:33
2.	"Ahrimanic Trance"	14:05
3.	"Ex Cathedra"	10:58
4.	"Crystal Ammunition"	14:20

== Personnel ==
Wolves in the Throne Room

- Nathan Weaver – vocals, guitar
- Will Lindsay – guitar, bass, backing vocals
- Aaron Weaver – drums, synth

Additional

- Randall Dunn – production, mixing
- Christophe Szpajdel – logo
