= Celestial Lineage =

Studio album by Wolves in the Throne Room
- Released: September 13, 2011
- Recorded: 2011
- Studio: Aleph Studios
- Genre: Post-black metal
- Length: 48:55
- Label: Southern Lord
- Producer: Randall Dunn, Wolves in the Throne Room

Wolves in the Throne Room chronology
Black Cascade (2009)	Celestial Lineage (2011)	Celestite (2014)

Celestial Lineage is the fourth full-length studio album by American black metal band Wolves in the Throne Room. It was released through Southern Lord Records on September 13, 2011.

On August 9, 2011, "Woodland Cathedral" was posted for streaming on National Public Radio.

== Production ==
Celestial Lineage was the last album recorded at Randall Dunn's Aleph Studio.

== Critical reception ==
Professional ratings
Aggregate scores
Source	Rating
Metacritic	87/100
Review scores
Source	Rating
AllMusic	4.5/5 stars
The A.V. Club	A
Chronicles of Chaos	9/10
Clash	8/10
Drowned in Sound	8/10
Kerrang!	4/5 stars
Mojo	4/5 stars
Now	4/5 stars
Pitchfork	8.6/10
Uncut	4/5 stars

Music critic Brandon Stosuy described Celestial Lineage as "American black metal's idiosyncratic defining record of 2011".

== Track listing ==
No.	Title	Length
1.	"Thuja Magus Imperium"	11:42
2.	"Permanent Changes in Consciousness"	1:55
3.	"Subterranean Initiation"	7:10
4.	"Rainbow Illness"	1:28
5.	"Woodland Cathedral"	5:26
6.	"Astral Blood"	10:16
7.	"Prayer of Transformation"	10:58
Total length:		48:55

== Personnel ==
Sourced from AllMusic's credits.

Wolves in the Throne Room

- Nathan Weaver - vocals, guitar, synthesizer, field recording
- Aaron Weaver - drums, guitar, percussion, field recording
- Jessika Kenney - sung vocals, choir/chorus, organ; composer, lyricist; arranger, vocal arrangement
