= Valusia =

EP by Zola Jesus
- Released: October 15, 2010
- Length: 20:45
- Label: Sacred Bones

Zola Jesus chronology
Stridulum II (2010)	Valusia (2010)	Conatus (2011)

Valusia is the fourth EP by American singer-songwriter Zola Jesus. It was released on October 15, 2010 on Sacred Bones Records.

== Track listing ==
All tracks are written by Nika Roza Danilova, except where noted.

No.	Title	Length
1.	"Poor Animal"	4:27
2.	"Tower"	3:58
3.	"Sea Talk"	5:03
4.	"Lightsick" (Danilova, Alex DeGroot)	4:11
5.	"Clay Bodies" (video)	4:54
6.	"Night" (video)	3:56
