= Zola Jesus =

American singer-songwriter (born 1989)

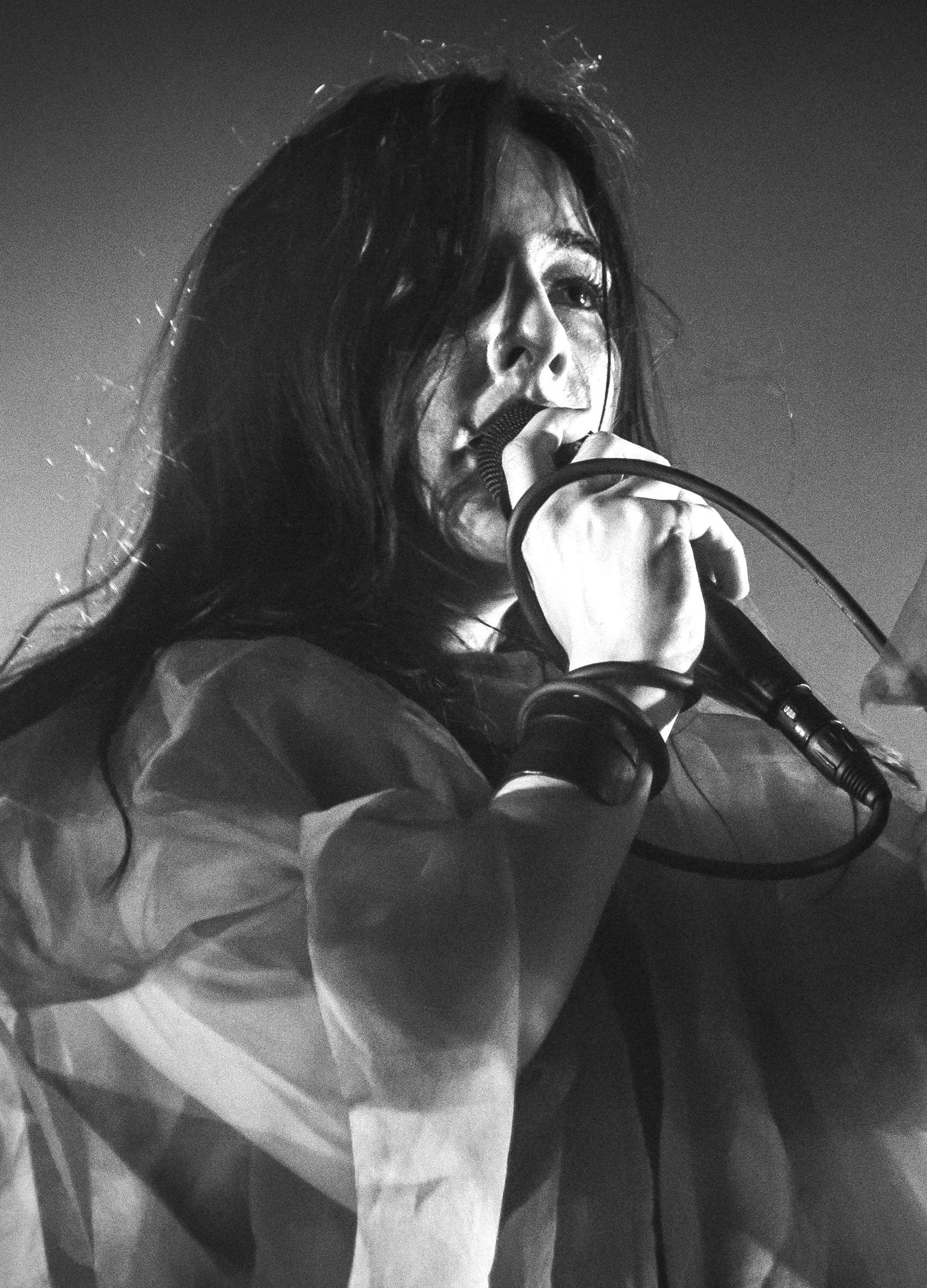
- Zola Jesus performing in New York, 2014

Background information
- Born: Nicole Rose Hummel; April 11, 1989 (age 37); Phoenix, Arizona, U.S.
- Genres: Synth-pop; dark wave; art pop; hypnagogic pop; industrial
- Occupations: Singer; songwriter; record producer
- Instruments: Vocals; piano
- Years active: 2006–present
- Labels: Troubleman; Sacred Bones; Mute; Die Stasi; Souterrain Transmissions
- Website: www.zolajesus.com

Nika Roza Danilova (born Nicole Rose Hummel; April 11, 1989), known professionally by her stage name Zola Jesus, is an American singer, songwriter, and record producer. Her music has been noted for combining elements of electronic, industrial, classical, and goth.

Born in Phoenix, Arizona, Danilova spent her formative years in northern Wisconsin, where she began writing and recording music independently while attending college. During her second year of studies, she released two singles through the independent label Sacred Bones, followed by two EPs. Her debut album, The Spoils, was released in 2009.

After graduating from the University of Wisconsin–Madison, she released her second full-length record, Stridulum II (2010), followed by Conatus (2011). Her fourth album, Taiga (2014), released by Mute Records, marked a departure from her previous releases, and featured a more prominent pop-influenced sound. Her fifth studio album, Okovi, was released in 2017, and sixth album, Arkhon in 2022.

== Biography ==
=== 1989–2008: Early life and career beginnings ===
Nicole Rose Hummel was born April 11, 1989, in Phoenix, Arizona, where she spent her early years. Her parents are first-generation Americans, with combinations of Ukrainian as well as German, Slovenian, and Russian descent. Her grandparents immigrated to the United States from Odessa, Ukraine, and settled in North Dakota. Honoring her ancestry, she formally goes by her Slavic name, Nika Roza Danilova. She has one older brother.

During her childhood, she and her family relocated to Merrill, Wisconsin, where they lived on a rural property situated in 100 acres (40 ha) of forest. "I resented my parents for having moved me away from Phoenix because I thought Phoenix was much more interesting than Wisconsin," she said. "It's a great place and it's very interesting there, beautiful."

She attended Wausau West High School, and after, enrolled at the University of Wisconsin–Milwaukee to study business. She began recording music at home while still in college, using keyboards, drum machines and other instruments. Her performing name, Zola Jesus, is a compound derived from the French writer Émile Zola, and the Christian messiah.

While studying at the University of Wisconsin-Milwaukee, she debuted the singles "Poor Sons" on Die Stasi and "Soeur Sewer", released in 2008 by Sacred Bones Records, after which she transferred to the University of Wisconsin–Madison. In 2009, while still in college, she recorded her debut full-length The Spoils, released by Sacred Bones in July 2009. In 2010, she graduated from the University of Wisconsin–Madison with a double major in French and philosophy.

=== 2009–2012: Stridulum II and Conatus ===
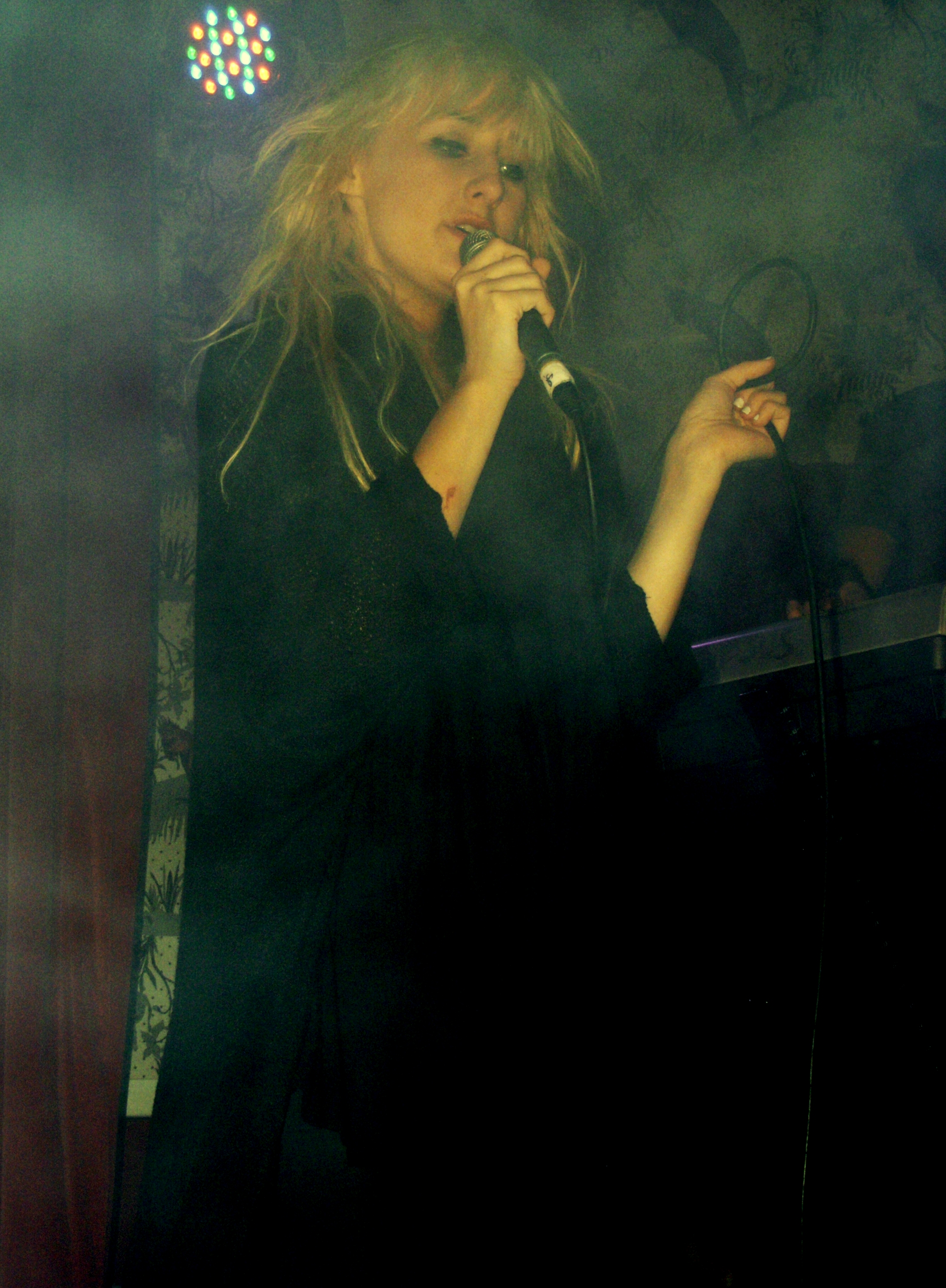
Zola Jesus performing in Manchester, 2010

Then followed Tsar Bomba EP (on Troubleman), New Amsterdam compilation on Sacred Bones and an untitled, limited-edition vinyl split with Burial Hex (Aurora Borealis). For touring she recruited Dead Luke (synths), bassist Lindsay Mikkola and drummer Max Elliott. Later the line-up changed to Shane Verwey and Nick Turco (synth), Alex DeGroot, and Nick Johnson, a drummer with metal band Jex Thoth.

Zola Jesus has also played with Former Ghosts. On Fever Ray's 2010 European tour, she performed as a support act and also toured with The xx. In the late 2009 collaboration between Zola Jesus and Rory Kane took shape (as Nika+Rory), a demo being put out on MySpace.

In March 2010, Zola Jesus released the Stridulum EP, named after the 1979 horror film of the same name by director Giulio Paradisi. After the release Zola Jesus performed at the SXSW Festival, for her second time. The same year, she issued a second EP, Valusia, also released on Sacred Bones. In July 2010, a collaborative third EP LA Vampires Meets Zola Jesus, was released. A collaboration with Amanda Brown of Pocahaunted, this EP presented "a dingy, lower-than-lo-fi sound and very little of what one would call traditional songwriting," according to Larry Fitzmaurice of Pitchfork.

Danilova followed these three EPs with her second full-length album, Stridulum II, which was released in August 2010, one month after LA Vampires Meets Zola Jesus. This album marked her feature full-length release in the United Kingdom, combining all six songs from the Stridulum EP (in a different sequence), along with three of the four tracks on the Valusia EP; the cover artwork is a slightly altered version of the artwork from the Stridulum EP. Laura Snapes of NME praised the album as a "gorgeously ethereal soundscape of a thousand years of heartbreak unleashed into one might howl." Additionally, NME ranked it the seventh-best album of the year.

In 2011, Danilova began composing her third full-length studio album, Conatus, which she co-produced with Brian Foote of Jackie-O Motherfucker and Cloudland Canyon. The album, released in September 2011 and named for the Latin word for "moving forward," featured less electronic components than Danilova's previous records, and included cello, double bass, violin, and viola. "I just wanted to try out new ways to produce and different ways to write," Danilova commented. "And with this new record it's a lot more stripped down and there are way more acoustic elements as opposed to no acoustic elements ... I just wanted more breathing room, so people could insert their own experiences into the song, their own feelings into the song, as opposed to me forcing it on them with the densest sound possible." Additionally, Danilova provided guest vocals on the song "Intro" by M83 from their 2011 album Hurry Up, We're Dreaming. She also sang on "New France" by Orbital, from their 2012 album Wonky.

=== 2013–present: Taiga, Okovi, and Arkhon ===
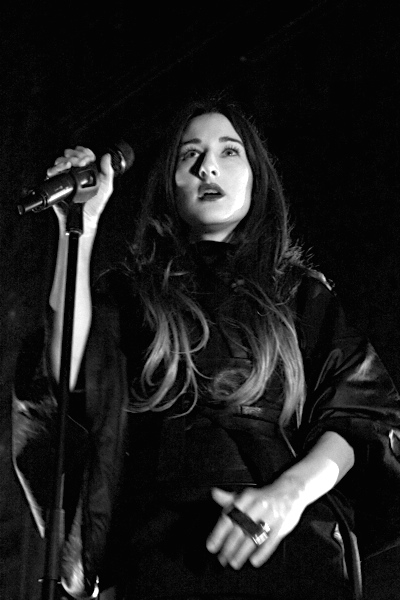
Zola Jesus performing at Webster Hall, New York City, 2014

In August 2013, Versions, a set of neo-classical reworkings of previous tracks from Zola Jesus releases, in a collaboration with producer JG Thirlwell, was released through Sacred Bones.

After having resided in Los Angeles for a period, Danilova found living in a large city was negatively impacting her ability to concentrate, and relocated to Vermont, followed by her native Wisconsin, before settling in Washington to begin completing her new record. On June 18, 2014, she announced the release of her fourth studio album, Taiga. This album, released by Mute Records, features a more prominent pop influence than her previous releases, with Danilova drawing inspiration from popular vocalists such as Mariah Carey and Barbra Streisand. "I was a child of the Nineties," she commented. "I grew up on Britney Spears, the Spice Girls, and I was listening to a lot of vocal music. You know, divas — Mariah Carey, Aaliyah, Barbra Streisand — strong female vocals. [On this record] I wanted to be really confident in my voice, which is usually very intense."

In 2017, Danilova relocated to her hometown of Merrill, Wisconsin, and built a home on her family's property. In September 2017, she returned to Sacred Bones to release her fifth studio album, Okovi, which she wrote after a protracted bout of depression. Prior to composing the album, Danilova said she spent time "watching movies, reading books, then I moved back to Wisconsin, started building my house, but mostly I was just trying to give myself time to live, because you write an album, then you tour and you forget you are a human being, you become a gipsy in a way, so it has been important to me to give myself more time to live outside of the music." The album marked her first to feature guitar instrumentation.

In May 2020, Danilova announced the release of her first live album, Live at Roadburn 2018, which features 12 live tracks from the 2018 Roadburn Festival in the Netherlands. It was initially made available via Bandcamp, and scheduled for a CD and double-LP release in June 2020.

In 2021, Danilova appeared on the podcast Storybound.

In 2022, she released her sixth album, Arkhon, on Sacred Bones Records.

== Artistry ==
=== Influences ===
Danilova has stated that she has been influenced by a number of singers and bands, including Ian Curtis, Lydia Lunch, Diamanda Galás, Throbbing Gristle, Swans, Bauhaus and Cristina. On her fourth album, Taiga, she mentioned mainstream pop artists such as Mariah Carey and Barbra Streisand as being influences on her vocal performance.

=== Vocals and musical style ===
Her style has been described variously as "commanded by ominous lyrics and a sultry Goth delivery," According to the NME, Zola Jesus "wails like Kate Bush" on a music sometimes evoking Joy Division. Q magazine noted her for her "haunting vocals and swirling, electronic atmospherics... located midway between Florence Welch and Siouxsie and the Banshees." She has also been compared to Nico, Lisa Gerrard of Dead Can Dance and Elizabeth Fraser of the Cocteau Twins.

Numerous Zola Jesus music videos have been directed by Canadian-American director Jacqueline Castel, including "Vessel," "Seekir," "Night," "Nail," and "Exhumed."

Since 2012, Zola Jesus has collaborated with New York-based costume designer and wardrobe stylist Jenni Hensler, whose work can be seen in the videos for "Dangerous Days," "Seekir," and "Hunger," and who also co-directed the remix video for "Ash to Bone".

== Personal life ==
She is a cousin of Minnesota Senator and former 2020 Democratic presidential candidate Amy Klobuchar.

== Band members ==
- Nika Danilova – vocals, electronics
- Alex DeGroot – guitar
- Louise Woodward – violin, viola
- Nick Johnson – drums

== Discography ==
- The Spoils (2009)
- Stridulum II (2010)
- Conatus (2011)
- Taiga (2014)
- Okovi (2017)
- Arkhon (2022)
