= Maximum Bob (singer) =

- Also known as: Smilin' Charlie, Big Hitter, Farmer Bob Hack
- Born: Robert Barnum
- Genres: Experimental rock, Heavy metal
- Occupation: vocalist
- Instrument: vocal
- Years active: 1991–present

Robert Barnum, better known under his stage name Maximum Bob, is an American musician known for his work as the lead singer and founding member of rock band Deli Creeps and for his singing on various releases related to avant-garde guitarist Buckethead. He is now the lead singer in Maximum Bob's Stockyard Skinners.

== Music career ==
Maximum Bob and his friend, guitarist Buckethead started a musical collaboration in 1987 that would eventually take the name Deli Creeps. The Deli Creeps played live at Madame Wong"s West in 1988. Maximum Bob first attracted wide public attention when performing backup vocals for the band Mr. Bungle. This was a guest appearance, recording on only one album with them, their debut album Mr. Bungle in 1991. During this time, he was still the full-time lead singer for the Deli Creeps, living in San Francisco and playing live often with Mr. Bungle, Sausage, Limbomaniacs and other successful acts in the Bay Area. Combining hard rock with shock factors based on the Sawyer family from the movie The Texas Chain Saw Massacre, they played shows to dumbfounded audiences that slowly grew to a rabid following. In 1999, after creating two demo tapes with the Deli Creeps (one in 1991 and the other in 1996) and touring along the San Francisco Bay area, Maximum Bob contributed to Buckethead's "Personalized Recordings", and a year later fronted "The Hook And Pull Gang", a Deli Creeps derivate that is not to be confused with the 80s punk rock band from Edinburgh, Scotland.

The Deli Creeps reactivated for a tour in 2003 and finally released their studio album Dawn of the Deli Creeps in 2005. Afterwards, the band went on a hiatus. Travis Dickerson, the owner of the Creeps' record label TDRS music, stated in a 2003 interview that there might be plans for a Maximum Bob solo album, but didn't give any specific dates. This was revived in 2008.

Meanwhile, Maximum Bob has contributed vocals and lyrics for "The Hand" off Buckethead's all-star album Enter the Chicken (2005, re-released in 2008) as well as singing parts of "Worship" on Profanation (Preparation for a Coming Darkness), an album by Bill Laswell led supergroup Praxis, released in January 2008 but recorded years earlier.

On his Instagram, Maximum Bob has mentioned recording music at TDRS, eventually leading to the release of his single "Please Mister DJ" in 2013

In a 2019 interview with We Only Do One Take Podcast, Maximum Bob talked about his new band, the Stockyard Skinners, as well as his interactions with Buckethead, Mr. Bungle, System of a Down and Praxis.

== Performance style ==
Maximum Bob is known for his unorthodox behavior on stage. Among the things he has done, he has stopped songs to ask the audience a question (though it usually doesn't interrupt the overall flow of the song), erratically moving around on the stage making strange gestures and noises, and making extremely dark and sexual jokes with the audience, usually about sex and murder. These all play into the dark and psychotic theme of the band. He also uses a form of recitative with onomatopoeic stuttering as part of the act.

== Musical style ==
Maximum Bob's displayed vocal range
Excerpt of 'Bend Up 1996'
His highest note, from the chorus of "Bend Up" from the 1996 Deli Creeps demo.

Excerpt of "Buried deep Stays Buried Still"
One of his lowest notes (Lowest notes on the Chorus of "Chores"), from "Buried Deep Stays Buried Still" from the Deli Creeps album Dawn of the Deli Creeps.

Maximum Bob uses a wide range, using deep and high pitched singing. He usually delivers lyrics in either slow short sections or long fast spoken segments in a deep bass range. His delivery of the chorus uses either deep or high pitched singing or, in studio recorded material, both at the same time, usually creating octaves.

== Personal life ==
Prior to a surprise appearance on the reality show Trick My Trucker, little to nothing was known about Barnum's past, apart from the musical projects he had been involved with. Before the album Enter the Chicken, the only album that refers to him by his birthname, he was only known by his stage name, and remains out of the public eye. Despite this, the official biography of Buckethead states that Maximum Bob was the one who took Buckethead in. Barnum is not to be confused with artist Robert L. Barnum.

=== Appearance on CMT/Trick my Trucker ===
In 2007, Barnum was a selected contestant on the fourth episode of the CMT reality series Trick My Trucker. During the show, many of the unknown elements of his life were revealed and made public. It was revealed that he currently lives in Hesperia, California with his wife of twenty years (as of 2001) Angelique, and their three children, however his current career was never mentioned. The episode also never mentions his work as a musician, other than an allusion to it when host Bob Guiney tells the audience to "see if spending time with us has brought him back to rock star status".

== Discography ==
- 1991: Mr. Bungle – Mr. Bungle
- 1991: Deli Creeps – Demo Tape
- 1996: Deli Creeps – Demo Tape
- 2005: Buckethead – Secret Recipe (DVD)
- 2005: Deli Creeps – Dawn of the Deli Creeps
- 2005: Buckethead – Enter the Chicken
- 2006: Buckethead – Young Buckethead Vol. 1 (DVD)
- 2006: Buckethead – Young Buckethead Vol. 2 (DVD)
- 2008: Praxis – Profanation (Preparation for a Coming Darkness)
- 2013: Maximum Bob – Please Mister DJ
- 2015: Maximum Bob – Myrtle
- 2018: Maximum Bob's Stockyard Skinners - The Gates
- 2018: Maximum Bob's Stockyard Skinners - All I Ever Wanted
- 2020: Maximum Bob's Stockyard Skinners - Holy Water
- 2020: Maximum Bob's Stockyard Skinners - Spongiform
- 2020: Maximum Bob's Stockyard Skinners - Num Nums
- 2021: Maximum Bob's Stockyard Skinners - Redux
- 2021: Maximum Bob's Stockyard Skinners - Tommy (Never Coming Home)
