= Matt Morgan =

American professional wrestler (born 1976)

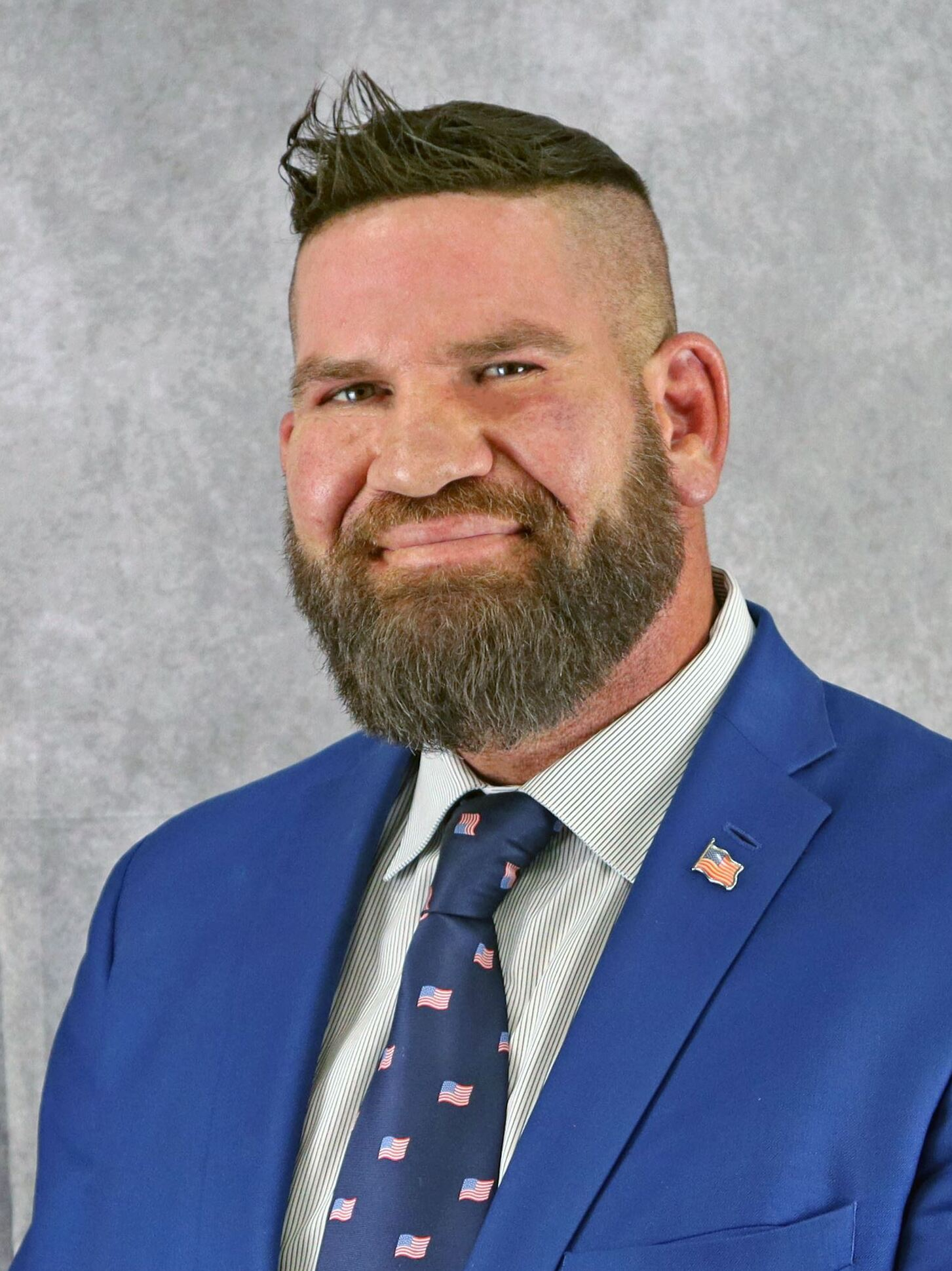

City Commissioner of Longwood, Florida
- Incumbent
- Assumed office November 13, 2017

Personal details
- Born: Matthew Thomas Morgan; September 10, 1976 (age 50) Fairfield, Connecticut, U.S.
- Party: Republican
- Spouse: Larissa Vasper (m. 2004)
- Children: 1
- Education: Monmouth University; Chaminade University
- Occupation: Politician; actor; professional wrestler
- Professional wrestling career
- Ring name(s): Gomora; Matt Morgan; The Blueprint
- Billed height: 7 ft 0 in (213 cm)
- Billed weight: 300 lb (136 kg)
- Billed from: Fairfield, Connecticut
- Trained by: Al Snow; Hardcore Holly
- Debut: October 2, 2002
- Retired: March 16, 2019

Matthew Thomas Morgan (born September 10, 1976) is an American politician and retired professional wrestler. He is known for his time in World Wrestling Entertainment (WWE), where he performed on the SmackDown brand, and Total Nonstop Action Wrestling (TNA), where he is a two-time TNA World Tag Team Champion. He is currently a commissioner (and formerly mayor and deputy mayor) for the city of Longwood, Florida. Morgan also appeared on American Gladiators.

== Early life ==
Matthew Thomas Morgan was born in Fairfield, Connecticut, on September 10, 1976.

After a successful high school basketball career at Fairfield High School in Connecticut, Morgan played Division I college basketball for Monmouth University at center position. During Morgan's freshman year at the university, the Monmouth Hawks defeated Rider University to become the Northeast Conference champions. By winning the conference tournament, Monmouth received an automatic bid to the 1996 NCAA tournament.

Of his trip to the tournament, Morgan said, "it was fun to be able to say that you actually played in the NCAA tournament and actually got some minutes. I didn’t score, but at least I got in as a freshman, which was cool." Monmouth lost to Marquette University in the first round of the tournament by a final score of 68–44.

Following a coaching change at Monmouth, Morgan transferred to Chaminade University in Hawaii, where he finished his college basketball career and graduated in public speaking. While at Chaminade, Morgan played in the Maui Invitational against the number one ranked Duke Blue Devils.

Morgan participated in tryouts for the NBA teams Indiana Pacers and Toronto Raptors, but he was not offered a contract by either team.

== Professional wrestling career ==
=== World Wrestling Entertainment (2002–2005) ===
==== Ohio Valley Wrestling (2002–2003) ====
Morgan was first introduced to the World Wrestling Federation when he entered as part of its Tough Enough II program but left the show early due to an injury. In April 2002, Morgan signed a developmental deal with World Wrestling Federation (WWF) and was assigned to Ohio Valley Wrestling (OVW). He made his OVW debut on October 2, 2002, at the OVW TV Tapings as "The Blueprint" Matt Morgan teaming with Mark Jindrak, defeating Travis Bane and Lance Cade. He wrestled there sporadically (usually winning handicap matches) until October 2003 when he was called up to the SmackDown brand.

==== SmackDown! (2003–2004) ====
Prior to his WWE main roster debut, Morgan was originally earmarked to become Kane's storyline brother named "Abel" wearing a mask even though the plans were scrapped and a similar role was given to Drew Hankinson years later.

Morgan then made his debut on the October 30, 2003, episode of SmackDown! and was chosen with the returning Nathan Jones by then General Manager of SmackDown!, Paul Heyman, to join Team Lesnar, which consisted of Morgan, Jones, Brock Lesnar, Big Show and A-Train. It was hinted that Morgan and Jones would be a tag team, but their only tag team match was at the Survivor Series pay-per-view on November 16, when they took on Team Angle (not the stable introduced one year earlier, but a one-off combination of five wrestlers). They lost to Team Angle in a ten-person elimination tag team match at Survivor Series; Morgan was eliminated from the match by Kurt Angle after Angle gave Morgan an Angle Slam. Morgan was then used to make run-ins along with the other members of Team Lesnar, helping Lesnar against his opponents.

Soon thereafter, Jones quit WWE, so Morgan occasionally teamed with Lesnar. He teamed up with Lesnar, Big Show, and Rhyno in a four-on-two Handicap match against Chris Benoit and John Cena on the January 22, 2004, episode of SmackDown!, in a losing effort. On January 25, he competed in the 2004 Royal Rumble match, in which the winner would get a title shot against their brand's champion at WrestleMania XX; he eliminated The Hurricane but was eliminated by Chris Benoit.

==== Return to Ohio Valley Wrestling (2004–2005) ====
After Brock Lesnar quit WWE, Morgan was written off television with an unmentioned injury and sent back to OVW for further development and experience, wrestling again as "The Blueprint" Matt Morgan and on April 14, 2004, he defeated Nick Dinsmore to become the OVW Heavyweight Champion. He held the title for almost six months before losing it to Chris Cage on October 13, 2004. Since the stipulation was that if Morgan lost he would "never show his face again" in OVW, he began wearing a mask to the ring and tweaked his name to simply The Blueprint. He would regain the OVW Heavyweight Championship on April 13, 2005, at an OVW live event after defeating Elijah Burke, but lost the title 17 days later to Brent Albright on April 30 after Albright forced Morgan to submit with the crowbar.

==== Return to SmackDown! and departure (2005) ====
Morgan returned to WWE on the April 21, 2005, episode of SmackDown!, with a new gimmick as a stuttering big-man who was defensive over his speech disorder, and quickly defeated a then-unknown jobber, Brett Matthews. On the May 19 episode of SmackDown!, he allied himself with Carlito and became his "backup". Morgan helped Carlito defeat Big Show at Judgment Day on May 22, using Lesnar's former finisher, the F-5. This partnership ended when Carlito was drafted to Raw, and Morgan was subsequently released by WWE on July 5, 2005. His last match in WWE was on the July 7 episode of SmackDown! against William Regal, although technically the match never took place as Morgan was attacked by The Mexicools before Regal ever got to the ring.

=== Japanese and European promotions (2005–2007) ===
Morgan toured with New Japan Pro-Wrestling in late 2005, defeating Yuji Nagata in his debut match. He was being pushed as a "monster gaijin" and along with Brock Lesnar, was expected to become one of NJPW's top foreign wrestlers, but plans for this were abandoned when he decided to leave NJPW to go to All Japan Pro Wrestling. Morgan debuted in All Japan Pro Wrestling as a member of Taka Michinoku's foreigner-oriented RO&D faction. He and Mark Jindrak wrestled for HUSTLE as a tag team under the names of Sodom and Gomora.

Morgan also worked for NWE Wrestling in Italy and Rings of Europe in Austria, where he participated as the Monster Heel in a 20 Men Rumble Match. He and Joe Legend became allies but were unable to defeat Austrian Hero Big van Walter in the end.

=== Total Nonstop Action Wrestling (2007–2013) ===
==== Jim Cornette's bodyguard (2007–2008) ====
Morgan debuted in Total Nonstop Action Wrestling (TNA) on the August 7, 2007, episode of TNA Today, appearing briefly in the background of a segment featuring Eric Young and Jeremy Borash. On the August 9 episode of TNA Impact!, Morgan appeared alongside former TNA Management Director Jim Cornette, with TNA later identifying him as Cornette's "backup". Morgan was the Special Enforcer in the Samoa Joe and Christian Cage match at Bound for Glory on October 14, preventing Christian's Coalition from interfering as Joe gave Cage his first true defeat in TNA. Morgan had to restrain Tomko and A.J. Styles on the edition of October 18 of Impact! when they tried interfering in the main event helping Christian defeat Samoa Joe in a Fight For The Right Qualifying match.

On the April 3, 2008, edition of TNA Impact!, it was revealed that Morgan allowed Team Tomko to add James Storm to their team, giving them a five-to-four advantage heading into Lockdown; however, at the end of the program, it was revealed that Morgan himself had joined Team Cage. The next week, Jim Cornette relieved Morgan of his assistant duties to become a full-time wrestler. With Morgan joining Team Cage, he established himself as a face, and went back to his old OVW nickname, "The Blueprint". Morgan teamed up with Kip James at Sacrifice on May 11 as a result of the Deuces Wild Tag Team Tournament draw. They failed to win the tag titles as James and Morgan could not get along long enough. He then began to feud with The Rock 'n Rave Infection after defeating Jimmy Rave in less than two minutes on July 17. Lance Rock immediately challenged Morgan to a match right there, and Morgan squashed him.

==== Various alliances and feuds (2008–2010) ====
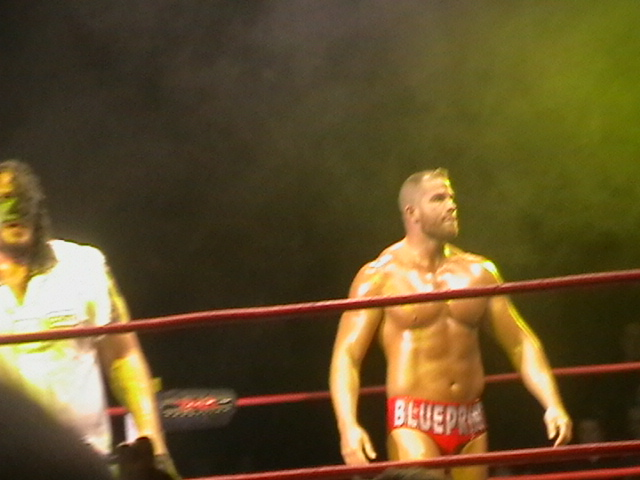
Morgan teamed with Abyss in 2008.

In August, Morgan entered a tag team up with Abyss. The storyline was an additional chapter in the "Abyss' humanization" storyline. Since his return to television, Abyss had portrayed an emotionally vulnerable character, exaggerating the meaning behind every gesture he received. Abyss saw Morgan as his best friend and was desperate not to displease him. But Abyss' new sensitivity made him more naive, thus causing him to make simple errors that cost the team matches. Through time, Morgan would go from understanding to frustrated over Abyss' errors. They feuded briefly with Team 3D. The duo defeated Team 3D at No Surrender, but lost at Bound for Glory IV on October 12 in a Monster's Ball match for the TNA World Tag Team Championship, which Beer Money, Inc. won. At Final Resolution on December 7, Morgan and Abyss lost again when Storm hit Abyss with brass knuckles when the referee was distracted. They gained a third opportunity at the belts at Genesis on January 11, 2009, in a three-way match against Beer Money, Inc. and then-champions Jay Lethal and Consequences Creed. During the match, Abyss accidentally knocked Morgan out with one of the championship belts, causing him to be pinned by Beer Money.

On the following Impact!, the team fought against Lethal and Creed in a number one contenders match for the tag team championship, which ended with Morgan once again being pinned because of Abyss. On the January 23 episode of Impact!, Morgan and Abyss battled Beer Money, Inc. in a non-title first blood match. Towards the end of the match, Morgan turned on Abyss after hitting him with a steel chair, causing him to bleed, giving Storm and Roode the win and turning heel in the process. Morgan was defeated at Against All Odds on February 8 in a standard match, but defeated Abyss in a Match of 10,000 Tacks at Destination X on March 15. The feud ended at Lockdown on April 19, in a Doomsday Chamber of Blood Match, in which neither wrestler could be legally pinned were he not bleeding. Morgan won after interference by Abyss' psychiatrist, Dr. Stevie, by hitting Abyss with a back low blow and then a chokebomb onto a pile of tacks.

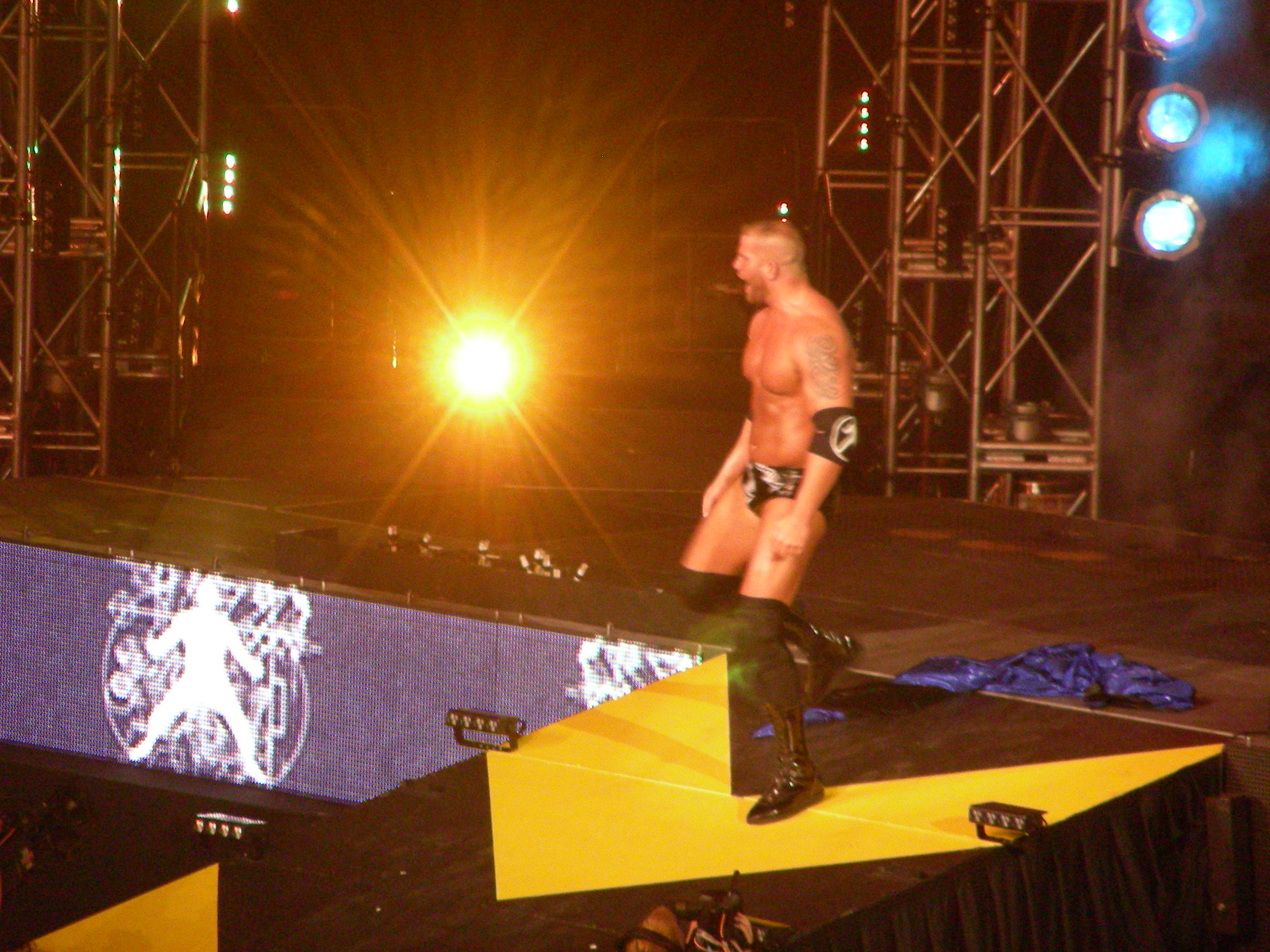
Morgan making his entrance at Slammiversary 2009

The following weeks Morgan began a campaign to convince the heel stable The Main Event Mafia to allow him to join them and become a member. He was aware that the current members of the Mafia were all former World Champions, but realizing that Team 3D, Kip James and Al Snow had been invited into the Mafia (Team 3D refused, and James and Snow were rejected), Morgan felt he should have been invited too. He faced Sting at Slammiversary on June 21, but was unable to defeat him and was thus barred from joining the Mafia. At Victory Road on July 19 he defeated Daniels to regain the Mafia's favor. On the August 13 episode of Impact!, Morgan defeated A.J. Styles in the deciding match of a "Best of Three Series" to secure his place in a triple threat match for the TNA World Heavyweight Championship at Hard Justice on August 16 also involving Sting and Kurt Angle. He lost at Hard Justice after Angle hit him with a steel chair. At No Surrender on September 20, Morgan competed in a re-match that also featured A.J. Styles and Hernandez, who used his "Feast or Fired" contract to include himself in the match, but was removed after a few minutes when he sustained an injury at the hands of Eric Young. During the match, Styles attempted a front flip senton from the apron onto Morgan outside of the ring, at the same moment Angle attempted to attack Morgan, but accidentally got struck by Styles instead. Morgan seemingly took this as a friendly gesture and agreed to assist Angle for the remainder of the match. But when Angle seemed set to win, Morgan turned on Angle and cost him the TNA World Heavyweight Championship, turning into a face in the process. On the September 24 episode of Impact!, Morgan cemented his newfound disinterest in the Main Event Mafia when he teamed with Hernandez to defeat Kurt Angle and Eric Young, which also solidified his status as a face. Later that night, Morgan teamed with former rival Abyss to defeat Kurt Angle and Mick Foley. Another week later, on the October 1 episode of Impact!, Matt Morgan defeated Eric Young. On October 5 Morgan announced on his Twitter page that he had signed a new 5-year deal with TNA. Morgan's feud with Angle culminated in a singles match at Bound for Glory on October 18, where despite Morgan's loss, he managed to gain Angle's respect. This match practically ended the Main Event Mafia.

Morgan then teamed up with Hernandez and D'Angelo Dinero and moved on to feuding with Rhino and Team 3D, who accused TNA of favoring the younger talent of the company. At Turning Point on November 15, Rhino and Team 3D defeated Morgan, Hernandez and Dinero in a street fight. The next night, the two teams had a re-match which ended the same way after Jesse Neal returned and attacked Hernandez with a steel chair. It was announced that the two teams would face of at Final Resolution on December 20 in an elimination match, but both teams were required to have four members. Team 3D immediately enlisted Neal, while Dinero pursued Suicide's help. Both teams fought in a regular tag match to determine an additional stipulation on the forthcoming match at Final Resolution. The match at Final Resolution would begin as a 4-on-1 handicap match, but if the disadvantaged wrestler survived the first 5 minutes his partners would then join the match, turning it into an eight-man elimination tag team match. Neal pinned Hernandez, meaning that Hernandez and his team would be disadvantaged at Final Resolution. At the pay-per-view Morgan, Hernandez (who survived), Dinero and Suicide defeated Jesse Neal, Team 3D and Rhino, with Morgan scoring the deciding fall on Brother Ray.

On the January 4, 2010, live, three-hour, Monday night episode of Impact! Morgan and Hernandez defeated Dr. Stevie and Raven to become the number one contenders to the TNA World Tag Team Champions British Invasion (Brutus Magnus and Doug Williams) at Genesis on January 17. At Genesis, Morgan and Hernandez defeated the British Invasion to win the TNA World Tag Team Championship, his first major championship. At Against All Odds on February 14, as part of the 8 Card Stud Tournament, Morgan and Hernandez were forced to face each other in the first round. Morgan defeated Hernandez by taking advantage of his injured shoulder and pinning him, while grabbing a hold of his trunks. However, in the semifinals Morgan was defeated by the eventual winner of the entire tournament, D'Angelo Dinero. At Destination X on March 21, Morgan and Hernandez retained the Tag Team Titles in a match against Beer Money despite plenty of miscommunication between the two champions. After the match Morgan nailed Hernandez with the Carbon Footprint and left with both title belts, turning heel in the process. The following day on Impact! Morgan defeated Hernandez via referee stoppage after sandwiching his head between his boot and the ring post, putting him out of action indefinitely. With Hernandez scheduled to miss months of action, Morgan declared himself the sole World Tag Team Champion on the edition of April 5 of Impact! and TNA went along with this and recognized him as the sole Champion. Morgan then went on to successfully defend the World Tag Team Title while teaming with the likes of Amazing Red, Shark Boy and Jesse Neal as his substitute partners, attacking each of them after the matches. On the May 3 episode of Impact! it was announced that Morgan would defend the World Tag Team Championship at Sacrifice on May 16 against Jesse Neal and Shannon Moore, both of whom he had attacked in the two previous weeks, and that Hulk Hogan would decide his partner for the match. On the May 13 episode of Impact! Morgan demanded to find out who his partner would be and when he did not get an answer, threatened to turn his match against Generation Me (Jeremy and Max Buck) into a bloodbath. However, Samoa Joe came to the ring to put a stop to this and hit Morgan with a Muscle Buster. This led to The Band coming out and Kevin Nash cashing in his "Feast or Fired" contract, after which he pinned Morgan to make himself and Scott Hall the new World Tag Team Champions. On the June 3 episode of Impact!, Morgan was distracted by somebody in the crowd which cost him a four-way match with Samoa Joe, Sting, and the winner of the match, TNA World Heavyweight Champion Rob Van Dam. The camera's immediately showed what was distracting Morgan, but nobody could clearly see who it was, although Taz and Mike Tenay believed it to be Hernandez. The following week, Hernandez made his official return by attacking Morgan. After the attack The Band gave the injured Morgan the rematch he had wanted for the World Tag Team Championship and easily defeated him to retain the title. At Slammiversary VIII on June 13, Morgan defeated Hernandez via disqualification, when Hernandez was disqualified for shoving the referee, when he had gotten enough of him reprimanding him for going after Morgan. The following month at Victory Road on July 11, Morgan was defeated by Hernandez in a Steel Cage match.

==== Fortune (2010–2011) ====
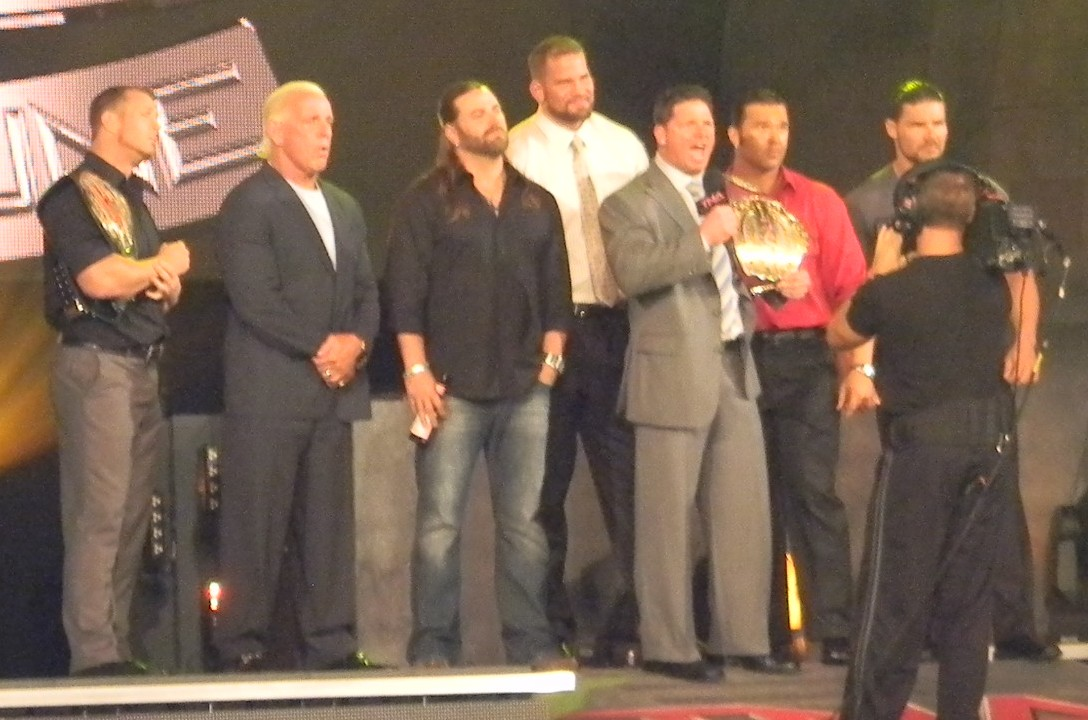
Morgan with the rest of Fortune in August 2010

On the August 12 episode of Impact! Morgan joined Ric Flair's Fortune (originally spelled Fourtune) stable, as he, A.J. Styles, Kazarian, Robert Roode, James Storm and Douglas Williams attacked EV 2.0, a stable consisting of former Extreme Championship Wrestling performers. At Bound for Glory on October 10, Morgan, Styles, Kazarian, Roode and Storm were defeated in a Lethal Lockdown match by EV 2.0 members Tommy Dreamer, Raven, Rhino, Sabu and Stevie Richards. On the following edition of Impact! Fortune formed an alliance with Hulk Hogan's and Eric Bischoff's new stable, Immortal. However, Morgan would be kicked out of Fortune after he faced Jeff Hardy for the TNA World Heavyweight Championship, turning him into a face. He would have two titles matches at Turning Point on November 7 and Final Resolution on December 5, but he lost both times.

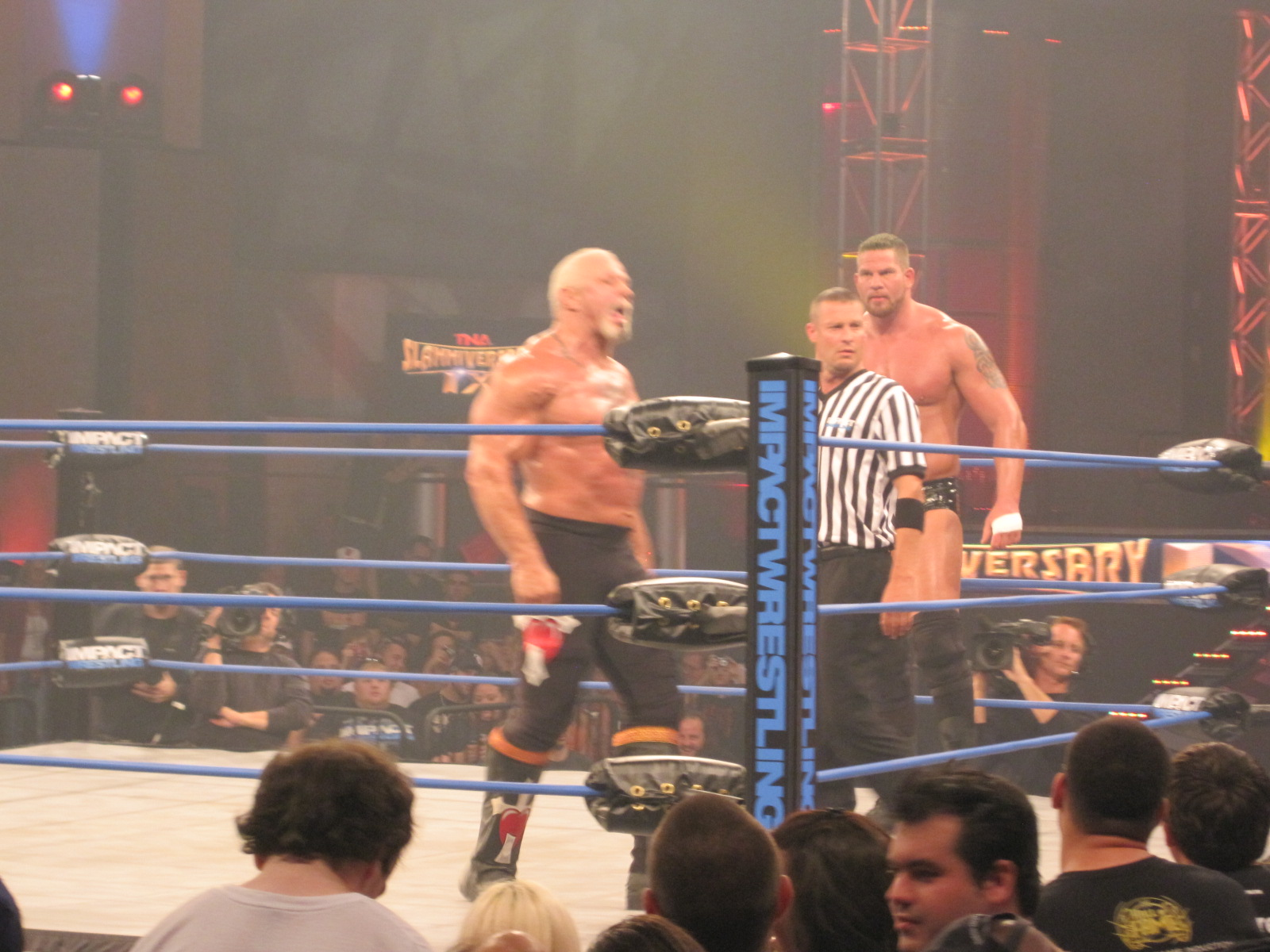
Morgan facing Scott Steiner at Slammiversary IX

At Genesis on January 9, 2011, Morgan was defeated by Mr. Anderson in a number one contender's match. On the February 10 episode of Impact!, Morgan received a shot at Anderson's TNA World Heavyweight Championship, but was defeated following interference from the returning Hernandez, who made his first TNA appearance in over six months. On the March 3 episode of Impact! Morgan defeated Hernandez via disqualification. On March 13 at Victory Road, Hernandez defeated Morgan in a First Blood match, after using fake blood on him, following a distraction from a planted fan, later identified as Anarquia, the newest member of Hernandez's Mexican America stable. On April 17 at Lockdown, Morgan defeated Hernandez in a steel cage match to win the feud. With his feud with Hernandez behind him, Morgan announced his intention of going for the TNA World Heavyweight Championship on the following edition of Impact!, but was interrupted by Scott Steiner who claimed to be next in line for the shot, before laying Morgan out with a low blow. On June 12 at Slammiversary IX, Morgan defeated Steiner in a singles match. Later that month, Morgan entered the Bound for Glory Series to determine a number one contender for the TNA World Heavyweight Championship. On the July 21 episode of Impact Wrestling, Morgan won a four-man ladder match to climb to number three spot in the tournament's rankings, however, just four days later it was reported that Morgan had torn his pectoral muscle, which would sideline him for six weeks, ending his participation in the tournament. Over the following weeks, Morgan was on commentary for the Bound for Glory Series matches. On August 29 it was reported that Morgan had been cleared to return to the ring.

==== Teaming with Crimson (2011–2012) ====
Heading to Bound for Glory, Morgan started a feud with Samoa Joe, who had vowed to ruin the Bound for Glory Series. On September 11 at No Surrender, Morgan defeated Joe in a grudge match, but lost against him on the following edition of Impact Wrestling in a submission match. At Bound for Glory, they would have a triple threat match also including the eventual winner Crimson. On November 13 at Turning Point, Morgan wrestled Crimson to a double disqualification. On the following edition of Impact Wrestling, Morgan and Crimson defeated Mexican America to win the TNA World Tag Team Championship. They would defend the titles against Mexican America, D'Angelo Dinero and Devon, and Magnus and Samoa Joe, until February 12, where they lost the championship at Against All Odds against Magnus and Joe in a rematch. They would try to regain the titles two times, but failed. After their second match at Victory Road, when Crimson turned on Morgan. On April 15 at Lockdown, Morgan was defeated by Crimson in a steel cage match. On the edition of May 10 of Impact Wrestling, Morgan and Crimson were set to face each other in what was billed as their "final confrontation", however, before the match could start, Morgan was attacked by Bully Ray. After Morgan was stretchered away, Crimson was given a countout victory. In an interview on June 14, Morgan expressed frustration with TNA management and confirmed that his contract with the promotion would be up soon. Working exclusively on house shows for his last month with TNA, Morgan finished his commitments with the promotion on June 16.

==== Final feuds and departure (2012–2013) ====
Morgan made a surprise return to TNA at a house show in Bethlehem, Pennsylvania, on September 15, entering through the crowd in street clothes, hopping a guardrail and attacking Robbie E. The following night at another house show in Wilkes-Barre, Pennsylvania, Morgan entered the ring after a match between James Storm and Jeff Hardy, delivering a Carbon Footprint to referee Brian Stiffler. The second appearance was later broadcast on the October 4 episode of Impact Wrestling, where Bruce Prichard was lecturing D'Lo Brown about the incident. Morgan returned to pay-per-view on October 14 at Bound for Glory, helping Joey Ryan defeat Al Snow to earn a TNA contract thus establishing himself as a heel. The following Impact Wrestling, Morgan explained his actions, claiming that Hulk Hogan had not delivered on his promises; Hogan in turn blamed the TNA creative about Morgan's treatment. While Morgan continued to vilify Hogan, it was insinuated that Hogan was just trying to rile him up, while secretly backing him. Morgan competed in his return match on the November 29 episode of Impact Wrestling, defeating Douglas Williams. On December 9 at Final Resolution, Morgan and Ryan unsuccessfully challenged Chavo Guerrero Jr. and Hernandez for the TNA World Tag Team Championship, after losing to them via disqualification. Morgan and Ryan challenged Guerrero and Hernandez again on January 13, 2013, at Genesis, but were again unsuccessful in winning their titles. In March, Morgan began "cleaning up the messes" that Hulk Hogan had made, beginning with attacks on World Heavyweight Champion Jeff Hardy and Joseph Park. The attack on Park resulted in a singles match on the March 21 episode of Impact Wrestling, where Morgan emerged victorious. On the April 25 episode of Impact Wrestling, Morgan confronted Hogan and offered his services to take out the Aces & Eights, in exchange for being named the number one contender for the TNA World Heavyweight Championship at Slammiversary, but was firmly denied. The following week, Morgan faced Sting in a number one contenders match for the World Heavyweight Championship, which Sting won after locking Morgan in the Scorpion Deathlock and making him pass out. Morgan's last appearance for the company was on the June 13 episode of Impact Wrestling, where he was defeated by Magnus in a four-way 2013 Bound for Glory Series qualifying match, which also included Kenny King and Rob Terry. After initially asking that same month, TNA granted Morgan his release from the company on July 9.

=== Independent circuit and first retirement (2013–2014) ===
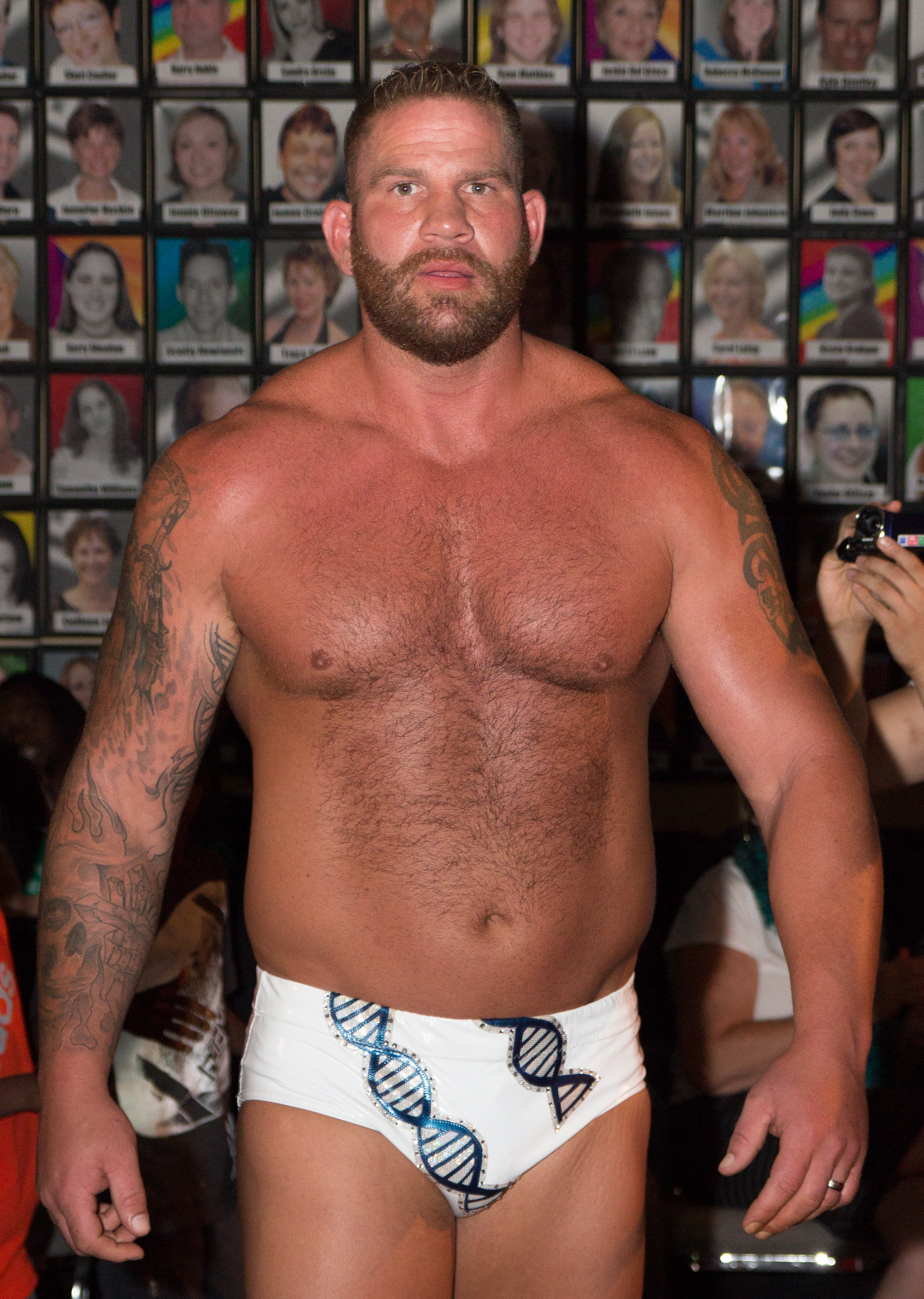
Morgan in 2013

Morgan debuted for AAA on June 16, 2013, at Triplemanía XXI, where he, Jeff Jarrett, and Monster Pain defeated AAA World Trios Champions Los Psycho Circus (Monster Clown, Murder Clown and Psycho Clown) in a non-title match.

Morgan made his first wrestling appearance since departing from TNA on August 31, 2013, at NWA Florida Underground Wrestling's Throwdown 6, defeating Kenneth Cameron. Morgan returned to NWA-FUW on October 26, defeating The Grease to win the NWA Florida Heavyweight Championship. In November, Morgan made successful title defenses against Leo Gold, Deimos, and The Titan.

Morgan made his debut for Family Wrestling Entertainment on October 12, 2013, at their Grand Prix iPPV, unsuccessfully challenging John Hennigan for the FWE Heavyweight Championship. Morgan returned to FWE on December 7 for their one-night tournament, losing to Ted DiBiase Jr. via count-out in the opening round.

In January 2014, Morgan announced his retirement from professional wrestling full-time in order to be with his wife and new born son, as well as begin a career as a regional manager for a "big-time medical device company". Morgan has stated that while he has a great love for professional wrestling and all the opportunities it afforded him, that his biggest dream in life was to be a father and so he had to take a job that allowed him to be home every night with his son, something he would not be able to do as a full-time wrestler. In an interview with Chris Van Vliet in February 2023, Morgan also spoke he was intended to return to WWE in the 2014 Royal Rumble event using The Blueprint gimmick he used in TNA but his son was born on January 7, days before the event and plans for it were then shelved.

=== Return to TNA (2015, 2017, 2022) ===
On June 24, 2015, Morgan returned to TNA as a face, after saving the returning Vader from an attack from Bram. It was soon announced that Morgan would face Bram at Slammiversary. At Slammiversary, Bram defeated Morgan after performing The Brighter Side of Suffering onto a steel chair. Morgan later confirmed that the match was a one-time deal only in order to give his son the chance to see him wrestle.

On the April 6, 2017 edition of Impact, Morgan made his return as the third pick on Team Jeremy Borash, joining Chris Adonis, Magnus and Alberto El Patrón. The foursome would defeat Team Josh Mathews (Bram, Eli Drake, Lashley and Tyrus) the following week. Morgan's next match was for the GFW Global Championship on Impact's May 4 episode; he would lose after suffering a low blow followed by a Michinoku Driver from then champion Magnus, solidifying the latter's heel turn. This would be Morgan's final appearance as he was granted his release request on July 24 by GFW, which was now Impact Wrestling renamed following its merger with Jarrett's promotion on April 20. Morgan says he had only agreed to return because Impact was close to his home, only taped on the weekends and did not tour, and therefore would not interfere with his other 9 to 5 career. This changed when GFW started taping its shows on weekdays and planning to travel, and so Morgan wanted out of the promotion.

On the June 9, 2022, episode of Impact!, Morgan made a one night return where he was interviewed by Gia Miller to talk about his career with the company until being interrupted by Vincent.

=== Return to the independent circuit and second retirement (2019) ===
On March 16, 2019, Morgan returned to the independent circuit where he wrestled the final match of his career, teaming with Deon James in a team match, defeating Braydon Knight and Chico Adams with Eric Christopher as their manager.

== Political career ==
In 2017, Morgan ran for public office, defeating incumbent Mark Weller as District 4 City Commissioner of Longwood, Florida. He changed his political affiliation from Democrat to Republican the same month he filed to run for office in the majority Republican county. Morgan would first serve as deputy mayor from November 2018 until May 2019. He served as mayor of Longwood from May 7, 2019, until September 2020. Morgan ran for Seminole County Commission in 2020 and lost to incumbent Bob Dallari, who received 60.1% of the vote to Morgan's 39.9%. He serves as District 4 City Commissioner of Longwood, Florida after his defeat.

Morgan was linked to former tax collector of Seminole County Joel Greenberg, via payments that Greenberg's office made to Morgan's company, Blueprint Enterprises, for consulting jobs. However, auditors wrote that they could find "no evidence of work product". Morgan was charged with no crimes. Seminole County commissioners agreed to hire a law firm to attempt to recoup public money misspent by Joel Greenberg.

In May 2022, Longwood city commission meeting, Morgan's fellow city commissioners elected Morgan to become the city's new mayor. He served as mayor until May 2023, and would again serve as the Longwood deputy mayor until November 2024. Since 2024, he has served solely as Longwood's District 4 City Commissioner.

== Personal life ==
Morgan announced on a 2008 episode of TNA Impact! during the TNA Webography segment where TNA Superstars give an insight into their life that he has been married to his college sweetheart, a Hawaiian/Filipino woman named Larissa Vasper from Hawaii for four years. During that Webography, he also announced that when he was five, he was diagnosed with attention-deficit disorder (ADD), which led to him getting involved with CHADD (Children and Adults with Attention Deficit/Hyperactivity Disorder), a non-profit organization based out of Landover, Maryland.

In August 2008, it was announced that Morgan would contribute a sample of his DNA to be launched into space as part of game designer Richard Garriott's "Operation Immortality" project.

In 2014, Morgan's wife, Larissa, gave birth to their first child.

Since 2016, Morgan has become a regular guest on The Wrestling Inc. podcast, reviewing the week's latest edition of Raw while also covering all WWE's pay-per-views and NXT's TakeOver events. In 2019, Morgan also started reviewing SmackDown, AEW Dynamite, NXT, and both WWE and AEW pay-per-views for Wrestling Inc.

== Other media ==
In 2008, Morgan accepted an offer to appear on the third series of American Gladiators as one of the Gladiators. Morgan, under the name Beast, made his Gladiator debut during the first night of the semifinals in the joust. He defeated each of his two opponents in less than eight seconds. On September 24, 2010, Morgan appeared on Fox television show The Good Guys, playing the role of a Russian mobster on an episode titled Vacation. In November 2010 Morgan was a contestant on an all TNA week of Family Feud, teaming with Jay Lethal, Mick Foley, Mr. Anderson and Rob Van Dam against Angelina Love, Christy Hemme, Lacey Von Erich, Tara and Velvet Sky. On June 30, 2011, Morgan was announced as being a part of the new season of CMT Made 101.

=== Filmography ===
Year	Title	Role	Notes
2009	American Gladiators	Beast	
2010	The Good Guys	Sasha Tsalka	Season 1, Episode 10
2010	Family Feud	Himself	5 Episodes, TNA Wrestling Special
2011	Death from Above	Animal	
2011	CMT Made 101	Himself	Season 1, Episode 1

== Championships and accomplishments ==
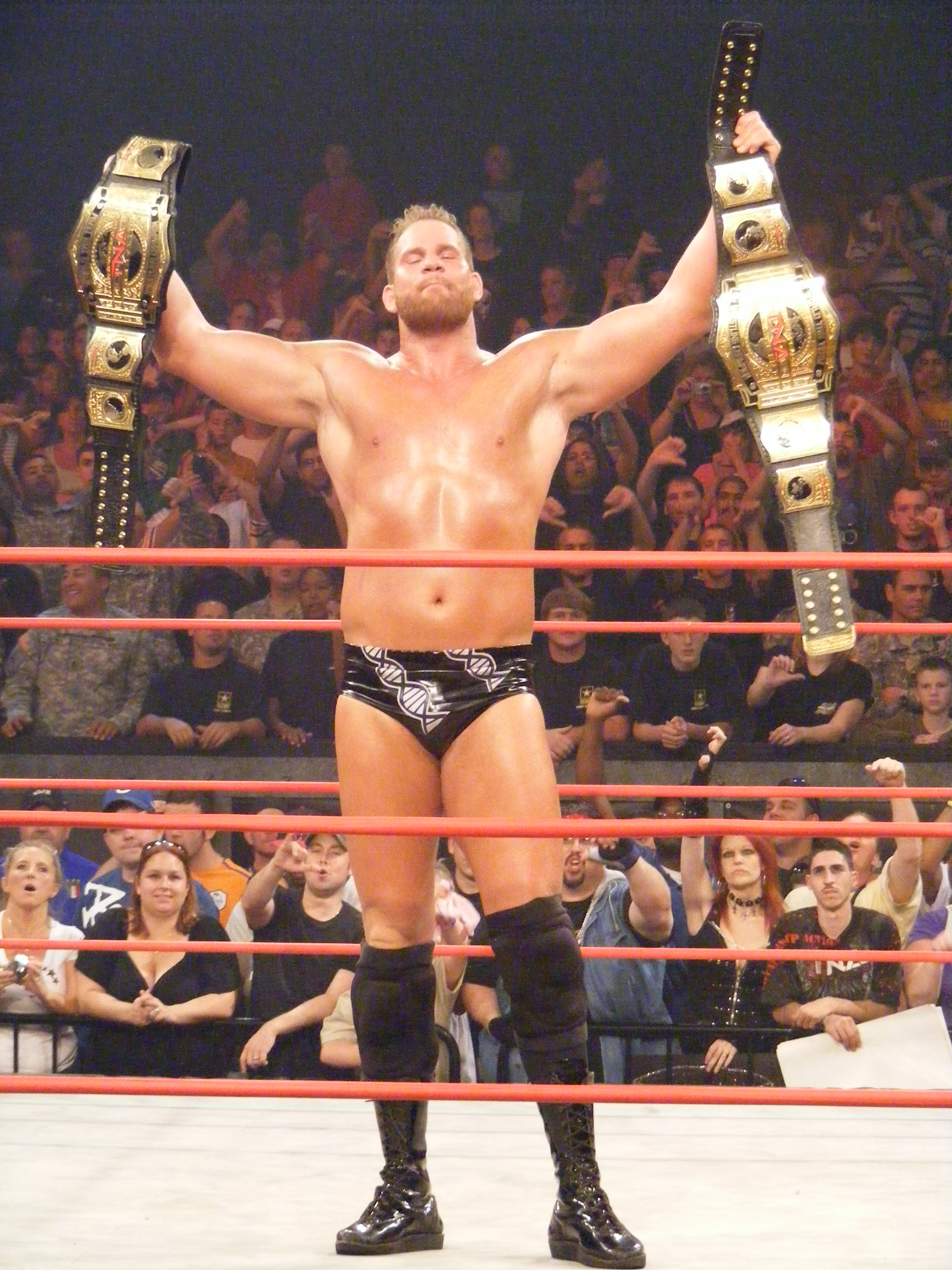
Morgan is a two-time TNA World Tag Team Champion.

- Far North Wrestling
  - FNW Heavyweight Championship (1 time)
- NWA Florida Underground Wrestling
  - NWA Florida Heavyweight Championship (1 time)
- Ohio Valley Wrestling
  - OVW Heavyweight Championship (2 times)
- Pro Wrestling Illustrated
  - Ranked No. 32 of the 500 best singles wrestlers in the PWI 500 in 2011
- Ring Ka King
  - RKK World Heavyweight Championship (1 time)
  - RKK World Heavyweight Championship Tournament (2011)
- Total Nonstop Action Wrestling
  - TNA World Tag Team Championship (2 times) – with Hernandez (1) and Crimson (1)
