= Karmic Juggernaut =

American rock band

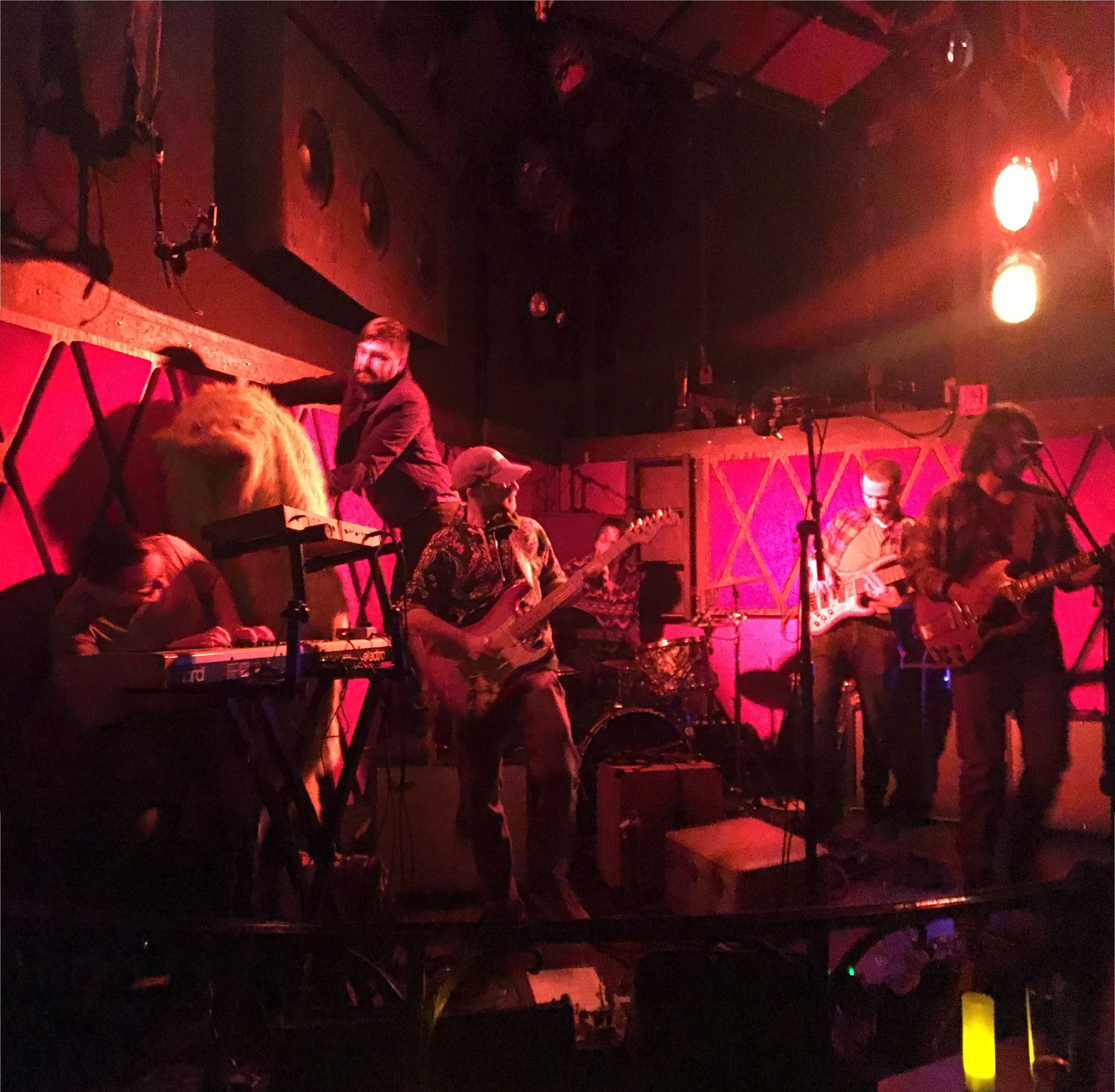
- Karmic Juggernaut at Rockwood Music Hall, on 5 April 2019.

Background information
- Also known as: K-Juggs
- Origin: Wall, New Jersey, U.S.
- Genres: Psychedelic rock, progressive rock
- Years active: 2004–current
- Label: WKRM The Kream
- Members: Kevin Grossman; Jake Hughes; James McCaffrey; Cody McCorry; Randy Preston; Daimon Santa Maria
- Website: karmicjuggernaut.com

Karmic Juggernaut is an American rock band from New Jersey.

== History ==
Karmic Juggernaut is a progressive psychedelic rock sextet from Wall Township, New Jersey, that formed in 2004 while several of the members were attending Wall High School. The three original members are Kevin Grossman, James McCaffrey and Randy Preston. The band currently consists of drummer Grossman, keyboardist Jake Hughes, vocalist and guitarist McCaffrey, bassist Cody McCorry, guitarist Preston and vocalist Daimon Santa Maria. The band has been the recipient of an Independent Music Award in 2019 and ten Asbury Park Music Awards for top instrumental categories. They draw comparison to the music of Yes, Frank Zappa, Mr. Bungle, Gong, Rush, Umphrey's McGee, and Primus.

Karmic Juggernaut is recognized by the Courier-Post and The New York Times for their blend of psychedelic and progressive rock, with jazz, blues and funk accompaniments, and their live improvisations, with loud, fast and experimental jams. A review of a 2014 concert by Speak Into My Good Eye notes that Karmic Juggernaut "excel[s] in the improvisatory arts [and] floored the audience, bringing them to their knees," and adds, "as far as I'm concerned, no one else in Asbury Park should be allowed to play a pedal tone, and nor should audiences accept it – it'd only be a second-rate knock-off." Grossman notes in an interview with The Pop Break, that "it feels the best when we improvise well. It's an out of body experience, and when the audience is right there with us, hanging on every note, it feels like the mothership is taking off."

Karmic Juggernaut's four-track 2012 EP was self-released, on 1 January 2012. The fourth song on the EP, "Oo Wah Hoo", was video recorded and taped in various spots of New Jersey, using Grossman's solar powered mobile recording studio, Sun Lab Studio. The music video for "Oo Wah Hoo" was released on 10 March 2012, and contains footage of the band recording the music in various wooded outdoor locations. A review by Matt Ascone for Speak Into My Good Eye says "K-Juggs dares to explore what happens when a band combines Hard-Rock sensibilities with a willingness to let go and explore the unknown. "Guacamole Genie" features intricate guitar work, growling vocals, precise harmonies, and stop-on-a-dime tempo changes." In 2014, the band released the music video for "Transgressions", which was also recorded and filmed using the Sun Lab Studio in conjunction with Telefunken microphones. Bassist McCorry of the band We Used to Cut the Grass, and later of Thank You Scientist, replaced Zach Westfall around this time, as Westfall was touring with singer/songwriter Nicole Atkins. With McCorry, the Sun Lab Studio was filmed for a 2015 episode of the television channel PBS' show, Driving Jersey. Karmic Juggernaut's second EP, the four-track Great Again!, was released on 23 July 2017.

=== The Dreams that Stuff Are Made Of ===
Following a one-night performance of Yes' 1971 album Close to the Edge, Bone & Marrow vocalist Daimon Santa Maria and Hive Mind keyboardist Jake Hughes joined Karmic Juggernaut. With the new lineup, Karmic Juggernaut recorded their debut thirteen-track album, The Dreams that Stuff Are Made Of, which was self-released on compact disc and digital download on 1 June 2018. Recorded at the band's own studio, The Hangar in Wall Township, New Jersey, the group was augmented with trombonist Ian Gray, trumpeter Joe Gullace and mallet percussionist AJ Merlino. It garnered praises from Dream Theater drummer, Mike Portnoy, and Jersey Beat, who calls the record "sprawling, fearless psychedelic rock [that] can be playful or rocking, and often a swirling combination of both."

The album recently won the album of the year in the Funk/Fusion/Jam category at the 2019 Independent Music Awards event in New York City.

=== Phantasmagloria ===
Following a hiatus during the COVID-19 pandemic, the band announced a new full-length album entitled Phantasmagloria will be released in early 2023. The album was recorded at their studio, The Hangar throughout the course of the pandemic.

== Members ==
- Kevin Grossman – drums, percussion and handpan
- Jake Hughes – keyboards
- James McCaffrey – guitar and vocals
- Cody McCorry – bass, theremin and saw
- Randy Preston – guitar and vocals
- Daimon Santa Maria – vocals and flute

=== Past members ===
- Andrew Black – bass
- Brian Gearty – bass
- Marcus Morieko – bass
- Zach Westfall – bass

== Discography ==
Albums

- The Dreams that Stuff Are Made Of (2018)
- Phantasmagloria (2023)

EPs

- 2012 EP (2012)
- Great Again! (2017)
