= Travolta (disambiguation) =

John Travolta (born 1954) is an American actor and singer

Travolta may also refer to:

- Ellen Travolta (born 1939), American actress and sister of John
- Joey Travolta (born 1950), American actor, filmmaker, and brother of John
- Margaret Travolta, American actress and sister of John
- "Travolta" (song), by American experimental band Mr. Bungle
- The Travoltas, a band from the Netherlands
- Travolta dress, an evening gown once owned by Diana, Princess of Wales and named after John
