= Deli Creeps =

American avant-garde band

- Origin: San Francisco, United States
- Genres: Avant-garde metal, experimental metal, funk metal
- Years active: 1990–2007
- Members: Maximum Bob; Buckethead; Pinchface
- Past members: Antinora (before 1991); Saucy Patches (before 1991); Tony Black (1991 - 1996); Josh Bockles (2003); Dan Monti (2005)

The Deli Creeps were an avant-garde metal band consisting of singer Maximum Bob, guitarist Buckethead, drummer Pinchface and various bass players, ending with Dan Monti. Many of their songs would be repurposed for Buckethead releases.

== Biography ==
The Deli Creeps formed in the late 1980's to early 1990's in Claremont, Southern California, United States, but shortly after moved to San Francisco. In 1991, they released their first demo tape with bassist Tony Black, after which they gained a strong loyal following before splitting up for the first time. Maximum Bob, during this time would contribute to the debut album of Mr. Bungle.

The band reformed in 1996 for the first time and released a second demo tape. In the interim only Buckethead through his contacts to John Zorn, Bill Laswell and Bootsy Collins had gained some public attention. Shortly after their second demo, they all moved on once again before reforming for the second time in 2003, with Josh Bockles on bass. They played would play a couple of concerts in California around that time. Buckethead was also the current guitarist for Guns N' Roses at this time.

Their first studio album Dawn of the Deli Creeps was released in late 2005. Dan Monti, longtime Buckethead collaborator, performed on bass, alongside several tracks performed by Tony Black. Featured on the album is the title track for the Terry M. West horror movie Flesh for the Beast.

Some early video recordings of the band were released in 2006 and 2007 on several Buckethead DVDs, including some complete concerts from 1990 and 1991.

The band members of the last incarnation still work together on different projects. Maximum Bob contributed guest vocals to Buckethead's album Enter the Chicken and the Praxis release Profanation (Preparation for a Coming Darkness). Buckethead, Pinchface and Monti toured the US in 2005 as a trio.

Mike Patton has been quoted as saying: "They're so good they piss me off".

== Style ==
The band derives its name from delicatessen shops and creepiness. During live performances, they would enter on stage with aprons on, similar to that of which butchers wear. Buckethead used variations of his face mask, but mostly wears hats instead of the bucket.

Distinctive marks of the formation in particular are Maximum Bob's lyrics of sex and personal life plus his differentiating recitation between melodic singing and psychotic screams. As a further trademark he developed a special form of recitative with onomatopoeic stuttering. Buckethead as the main instrumental performer supports or counteracts this with the use of all his typical stylistic devices: chromatic runs and dissonant playing noises, but also riffs and chord progressions or short citations from blues and country.

== Discography ==
=== Demo tapes ===
- Deli Creeps (1990)
- Deli Creeps (1991)
- Deli Creeps (1996)

=== Studio albums ===
- Dawn of the Deli Creeps (2005)

=== Appearances ===
- Various Artists - Shrimper: A PSST Compliation - Summer o' 1990 (1990)
- Buckethead & Deli Creeps - Flesh for the Beast soundtrack (2003)
- Buckethead - Secret Recipe (2006)
- Buckethead - Young Buckethead, Vol. 1 (2006)
- Buckethead - Young Buckethead, Vol. 2 (2006)

== Track listings ==
=== Demo tapes ===
Deli Creeps (1990)

| No. | Title | Length |
|---|---|---|
| 1. | "Can I Have a Ride?" | 4:48 |
| 2. | "Random Killing" | 4:59 |
| 3. | "Shadows" | 4:57 |
| 4. | "Dream Girl" | 4:03 |
| 5. | "Suuuweee" (Instrumental) | 4:59 |

Deli Creeps (1991)

| No. | Title | Length |
|---|---|---|
| 1. | "Random Killing" | 4:57 |
| 2. | "Dream Girl" | 3:56 |
| 3. | "Tribal Rites" | 2:49 |
| 4. | "Shadows" | 4:45 |
| 5. | "Can I Have a Ride?" | 4:39 |

Deli Creeps (1996)

| No. | Title | Length |
|---|---|---|
| 1. | "Boom Cha Ka" | 4:06 |
| 2. | "Can I Have a Ride?" | 6:05 |
| 3. | "Chores" | 5:17 |
| 4. | "Bend Up" | 3:55 |
| 5. | "Feast of Freaks" | 14:01 |

=== Studio albums ===
Dawn of the Deli Creeps (2005)

| No. | Title | Length |
|---|---|---|
| 1. | "Can I Have a Ride?" | 7:21 |
| 2. | "Dream Girl" | 4:00 |
| 3. | "Found Body" | 3:35 |
| 4. | "Flesh for the Beast" | 5:58 |
| 5. | "Hatchet" | 3:27 |
| 6. | "Time" | 5:11 |
| 7. | "Grampa Bill" | 3:32 |
| 8. | "Chores" | 4:29 |
| 9. | "Beauty of Life" | 2:12 |
| 10. | "Buns of Steel" | 2:12 |
| 11. | "Buried Deep Stays Buried Still" | 4:56 |
| 12. | "Boom Ch Ka" | 5:20 |
| 13. | "Random Killing" | 5:25 |

=== Credits ===
- Buckethead - guitar
- Maximum Bob - vocalist
- Pinchface - drums, backing vocalist
- Dan Monti - bass guitar
