= The Dreams that Stuff Are Made Of =

Studio album by Karmic Juggernaut
- Released: 1 June 2018
- Studio: The Hangar, Wall Township, New Jersey
- Genre: Psychedelic rock, progressive rock
- Length: 60:33
- Label: Self-released
- Producer: Karmic Juggernaut

Karmic Juggernaut chronology
Great Again! (2017)	The Dreams that Stuff Are Made Of (2018)

The Dreams that Stuff Are Made Of is the debut studio album from the American rock band Karmic Juggernaut.

== Content ==
The thirteen-track album was self-released on compact disc and digital download, on 1 June 2018. It was produced by Karmic Juggernaut, and recorded at The Hangar in Wall Township, New Jersey. The group was augmented by trombonist Ian Gray, trumpeter Joe Gullace, and mallet percussionist AJ Merlino. The Dreams that Stuff Are Made Of is described as high-energy, rhythmic and dense progressive rock that spans several genres, and it draws comparison to the music of King Crimson, Mr. Bungle, The Mars Volta, Frank Zappa, Gentle Giant, and Yes.

== Reception ==
Dream Theater drummer Mike Portnoy writes "Damn! Another amazing new find...just got turned onto this amazing psychedelic progressive jazzy band from NJ called Karmic Juggernaut and Blown Away!," adding "I'm definitely now a fan and this is also definitely in my Top 10 of 2018. Bravo." A review by Rich Quinlan in Jersey Beat begins with "wow...this one is a trip, perhaps quite literally, from start to finish. If Zappa's Barking Pumpkin label was still active, Karmic Juggernaut might be the first band he would sign. Sprawling, fearless psychedelic rock, the songs can be playful or rocking, and often a swirling combination of both," and ends with saying that the album is "indeed a tank of innovative ideas performed by a collection of immensely skilled, like-minded geniuses who relish the idea of being musical outliers."

Progressive Music Planet says "once you ride [the] wave and let the music unfold, one gets some pretty excellent syncopated full-band acrobatics with dynamics that ebb-and-flow and deliver right into the next track. Horn section, flute, walking basslines, bongos and other percussion, odd meters."

The album recently won the album of the year award in the Funk/Fusion/Jam category at the 2019 Independent Music Awards event in New York City.

== Tracklisting ==
No.	Title	Length
1.	"Bottomless Gypsy Pit"	5:17
2.	"Krokodil"	4:51
3.	"Robotnik"	4:46
4.	"WKRM Emergency Broadcast"	0:44
5.	"Frunobulax"	5:03
6.	"Circles"	0:49
7.	"Moving"	9:00
8.	"On Your Mark"	6:14
9.	"Living in a Lucid Dream"	0:56
10.	"Goons, Buffoons, and Carnival Barkers"	3:33
11.	"Psycho Billy's Downtown Adventure"	2:45
12.	"Be Careful Loading Camel"	8:55
13.	"Museum Museum"	7:40
Total length:		60:33

== Personnel ==
- Kevin Grossman – drums and percussion
- Jake Hughes – keyboards
- James McCaffrey – guitar and vocals
- Cody McCorry – bass, theremin and saw
- Randy Preston – guitar and vocals
- Daimon Santa Maria – vocals and flute

=== Additional musicians ===
- Ian Gray – trombone
- Joe Gullace – trumpet
- Joonas Lemetyinen – trombone
- AJ Merlino – percussion, vibes
