= Young Buckethead Vol. 2 =

Video by Buckethead
- Released: 2006
- Recorded: 1990–1991; Southern California
- Genre: Avant-garde, funk metal
- Length: 1:35:00
- Label: Avabella Productions
- Director: Jas Obrecht
- Producer: Jas Obrecht

Buckethead chronology
Young Buckethead Vol. 1 (2006)	Young Buckethead Vol. 2 (2006)

Professional ratings
Review scores
Source	Rating
Allmusic	3.5/5 stars

Young Buckethead Vol. 2 is a DVD made by Buckethead and released in 2006 by Jas Obrecht's label, Avabella.

Vol. 2 includes two complete Deli Creeps concerts in San Francisco, unrehearsed backstage footage, and a rare Buckethead interview in a park. Saucy Patches appeared in one concert (9/1/90), before being replaced by Tony Black in the other concert (4/3/91).

== DVD contents ==
- Deli Creeps at the I-Beam - 9/1/90
- Deli Creeps backstage - 9/1/90
- Deli Creeps at the Kennel Club - 4/3/91
- Buckethead in the Park - 12/29/90

== See also ==
- Maximum Bob
- Pinchface
