= Young Buckethead Vol. 1 =

Video by Buckethead
- Released: 2006
- Recorded: 1990–1991; Southern California
- Genre: Instrumental rock
- Length: 1:35:00
- Label: Avabella Productions
- Director: Jas Obrecht
- Producer: Jas Obrecht

Buckethead chronology
Secret Recipe (2005)	Young Buckethead Vol. 1 (2006)	Young Buckethead Vol. 2 (2006)

Professional ratings
Review scores
Source	Rating
Allmusic	4/5 stars

Young Buckethead Vol. 1 is the second DVD made by the guitarist Buckethead, released in 2006 by Jas Obrecht's label, Avabella.

The material from this DVD was cut in half making 2 volumes of the DVD, Vol. 1 consists of a recompilation of concerts made by Buckethead and the band Deli Creeps, in which Buckethead is part of, just as Buckethead and the Deli Creeps were beginning to play outside of their southern California hometown.

Vol. 1 features a 1990 Deli Creeps concert and the soundcheck in San Francisco, also a keyboard performance in a San Francisco basement, and an extended guitar solo performed by Buckethead at a family reunion.

The DVD includes the original version of the song "Binge and Grab" from the album Giant Robot (1994). It features lyrics by singer Maximum Bob while the studio album version of the song is instrumental.

All drawings were made by Buckethead.

== Features ==
- Deli Creeps at Cactus Club 11/24/90
- Deli Creeps Soundcheck 11/24/90
- Buckethead in the Basement 5/21/91
- Buckethead¹s Backyard Solo 6/16/91

== Credits ==
- Buckethead
- Maximum Bob
- Pinchface
- Tony Black
