= List of programs broadcast by CMT =

The following is a list of programs currently and formerly broadcast on CMT as of January 2024.

== Current programs ==
=== Original programming ===
==== Music shows ====
- CMT Music Playlist (since 1983)

=== Syndicated programming ===
- The Golden Girls (2020–present)
- The King of Queens (2020–present)
- Mama's Family (2003–08; 2023–present)
- Reba (2012–present)
- Roseanne (2012–present)
- Yellowstone (2022–present)
- Cheers (2026-present)

== Former programming ==
=== Original programming ===
==== Music shows ====
- Can You Duet (2008–2009)
- CMT #1 Music and a Movie (2009–2013)
- CMT 3rd Shift (2002–2004)
- CMT All Access (1998–2001)
- CMT Big 4-0 (2001–02)
- CMT Campfire Sessions (2021-24)
- CMT Cross Country (2006–07)
- CMT Crossroads (2002-24)
- CMT Dance Ranch (1993–98)
- CMT Defining (2023)
- CMT Delivery Room (1994–2001)
- CMT Flameworthy (2002–2003)
- CMT Giants (2006-08, 2020-24)
- CMT Got Me In With the Band (2002–04)
- CMT Greatest Hits (2002–04)
- CMT Home Blitz (2005)
- CMT Homecoming (2004–06)
- CMT Hot 20 Countdown (2013–25)
- CMT Inside Fame (2001–2005)
- CMT Insider (2004–11)
- CMT Insider Special Edition (2004–10)
- CMT Invitation Only (2007–11)
- CMT Made (2011)
- CMT Morning (1997–2001)
- CMT Most Shocking (2003–05)
- CMT Most Wanted Live (2001–04)
- CMT Music (1983–2001)
- CMT Music Awards (2001–24)
- CMT Outlaws (2004–05)
- CMT Power Picks (2006–10)
- CMT Prime! (2002)
- CMT Pure Country Preview (2006)
- CMT Showcase (1994–2001)
- CMT Signature Series (1994–2002)
- CMT Stone Country (1997–2001)
- CMT Storytellers (2022-24)
- CMT Summer Camp (2022-23)
- CMT Summer Sessions (2023)
- CMT Top 12 Countdown (1994–2001)
- CMT's Next Superstar (2011)
- CMT's Southern Fried Flicks With Hazel Smith (2001)
- Top 20 Countdown (2001–2012)

=== Reality shows ===
- Bachelorette Weekend (August 2, 2018 – October 6, 2018)
- Chainsaw Gang (November 10, 2012 – December 31, 2016)
- CMT Comedy Stage (2007)
- Cowboy U (August 29, 2003 – 2007)
- Country Fried Home Videos (2006–2009)
- Dallas Cowboys Cheerleaders: Making the Team (September 29, 2006 – November 27, 2021)
- Dog and Beth: On the Hunt (April 21, 2013 – August 22, 2015)
- The Dude Perfect Show (2016)
- The Ed Bassmaster Show (2015–16)
- Guntucky (April 21, 2013 – April 26, 2014)
- I Love Kellie Pickler (November 6, 2015 – October 6, 2017)
- I Want to Look Like a High School Cheerleader Again (2007)
- The Josh Wolf Show (June 11, 2015 – 2016)
- Melissa & Tye (April 20, 2012 – June 8, 2012)
- Music City (March 1, 2018 – January 31, 2019)
- My Big Redneck Wedding (January 11, 2008 – March 18, 2011)
- My Dysfunctional Family (2014)
- Nanny 911 (2009)
- Nashville Squares (November 1, 2019 – November 29, 2019)
- Party Down South (January 16, 2014 – April 14, 2016)
- Party Down South 2 (2014–15)
- Racing Wives (August 2, 2019 – September 20, 2019)
- Redneck Island (June 9, 2012)
- Steve Austin's Broken Skull Challenge (July 6, 2014 - December 19, 2017)
- Tattoo Titans (2014)
- World's Strictest Parents (2009–2010)

==== Drama ====
- Bounty Hunters (2013)
- Nashville (2016–2018)
- Sun Records (2017)

==== Comedy ====
- Working Class (2011)
- Still the King (2016–2017)

=== Acquired programming ===
- 1883 (2021) (Special presentation, simulcast with Paramount+ and Paramount Network)
- 20/20 Crime on CMT
- America's Funniest Home Videos (2015–16)
- American Housewife (2020–23)
- American Revolutions (2005–06)
- Are You Smarter Than a 5th Grader? (2009–12)
- Award-Winning Look (2004)
- Bandits vs. Smokies
- Barely Famous (2004–05)
- Bayou Billionaires (2013–16)
- Big Texas Heat (2013–16)
- Big Ticket (1994–2002)
- Bill Engvall's "Here's Your Sign" Awards (2008–present)
- Billy Ray Cyrus: Home at Last (2008)
- Cassadee Pope: Frame by Frame
- Class Of... (2005)
- Controversy (2004)
- Country Fried Planet (2008–present)
- Country's Hottest Hookups (2003)
- Cops Reloaded (2013–2020)
- Cowboy Cool Theater (2003)
- Danger Coast
- Devoted (2003)
- The Drive (2004)
- The Dukes of Hazzard (2005–15)
- Everybody Loves Raymond (2016)
- Extreme Makeover: Home Edition
- The Fabulous Life of... (2004)
- Face the Music (1999–2001)
- Family Feud (Steve Harvey; 2019)
- Fast Living (2004)
- Fear Factor
- Foxworthy's Big Night Out (2006)
- Full House (2018–21)
- Gainesville (2015–16)
- Gator 911
- George Lopez (2015)
- Gone Country
- Grand Ole Opry Live (2002–03)
- The Great Christmas Light Fight (2019)
- The Greatest (2002–12)
- Hee Haw (2006–07)
- Hell's Kitchen
- High 5 Video Countdown
- Hillbillies for Hire (2013–16)
- Hit Trip (1998–2001)
- Hogan Knows Best
- Home Improvement (2018–2021)
- Hulk Hogan's Celebrity Championship Wrestling (2008)
- In the Moment (2004–11)
- Inside Fame (2001–05)
- Jammin' Country (1994–2001)
- Jennie Garth: A Little Bit Country (2012)
- Karaoke-Dokey (2007)
- King of the Hill (2018–2019)
- Kitchen Nightmares
- Last Man Standing (2015–2024)
- Life & Times (2001–02)
- Making the Video (2002–04)
- Malibu Country
- Married... with Children
- Mike & Molly (2021–2025)
- Mobile Home Disaster (2008–10)
- Mom (2017; 2019–2025)
- MWL Star (2003)
- My Big Redneck Family (2014–16)
- My Big Redneck Vacation (2012)
- Nanny 911 (2008–10)
- NASCAR: The Rise of American Speed (May 2016)
- The New Adventures of Old Christine (2016)
- On The Verge (2000–02)
- Orange County Choppers (1999–2016)
- Personal Playback (2001)
- Pickler & Ben (September 18, 2017)
- Prankville
- Pure 12-Pack Countdown (2006)
- Raising Hope (2017)
- Redneck Dreams
- Redneck Rehab
- Reel Eats (2014–16)
- Request Line (1997–2001)
- Ridiculousness (2019)
- Saturday Night Dance Ranch (1994–99)
- The Singing Bee
- Skinhead Bald Women
- Stacked (2006–11)
- Star Pads (2002)
- Supernanny (2010–12)
- Swamp Pawn (2013–16)
- Sweet Home Alabama
- Texas Justice (2007)
- Texas Women
- That '70s Show (2014)
- Three Chords from the Truth
- Top Secret Recipe (2011)
- Top Ten Countdown (2005–11)
- Top 20 Countdown
- Total Release (2002–05)
- Trading Spouses
- Trick My Truck
- Trick My Trucker
- Trick My What? (2011)
- True Grit (2006–10)
- Ty Murray's Celebrity Bull Riding Challenge
- Ultimate Country Home (2003)
- The Ultimate Coyote Ugly Search
- Ultimate Home (2004)
- Unplugged (1989–92)
- Video Bio (1999–2001)
- Video Confessions (2003)
- Walker, Texas Ranger (2019–2021)
- Western Beat (2000–01)
- Wide Open Country (2005–07)
- World's Most Amazing Videos (2012–2013)
- Yes, Dear (2012–13)
- Young Sheldon (2023–24)
