= Disco Volante (Mr. Bungle album) =

Studio album by Mr. Bungle
- Released: October 10, 1995
- Recorded: 1995
- Genres: Experimental; experimental rock; art rock; jazz-metal; avant-garde metal; jazz fusion; Nuevo tango; noise
- Length: 68:40
- Label: Warner Bros.
- Producer: Mr. Bungle

Mr. Bungle chronology
Mr. Bungle (1991)	Disco Volante (1995)	California (1999)

Singles from Disco Volante
- 1. "Platypus" Released: 1995

Disco Volante (Italian for UFO, literally Flying Saucer) is the second studio album by the American experimental rock band Mr. Bungle. It was released on October 10, 1995, through Warner Bros., and is often considered their most experimental album, mixing elements from such varied styles as death metal, jazz, Arabic music, musique concrète, easy listening, klezmer, and tango.

== Background ==
The album's title refers to the name of the yacht of the same name featured in the James Bond film Thunderball, meaning "flying saucer" in Italian. Mr. Bungle had previously covered the film's theme song live and in the studio, but it was never officially released.

Disco Volante would be founding member Theo Lengyel's final album with the band, leaving shortly after the tour due to "artistic differences". Drummer Danny Heifetz would later comment, "I miss him. He added a huge chemical imbalance that helped us on the road. He hates us and rightfully so. The music changed, plain and simple. Very little call for saxes, trombone or flute. He was an original member. I'm not. Makes me feel a bit like a union-buster."

Regarding the writing process of the album, bassist Trevor Dunn wrote on his website:

Trey was listening to his own collection of weird stuff as well—exotica, electro-acoustic, noise, middle eastern, techno. I remember him going to raves a lot back then. Mike was really into Joe Meek, the Peter Thomas soundtrack to Raumpatrouille, Kagel and the tangos of Troilo. He would show up between tours to work with us and add his beautifully low-fi input (i.e The Bends). With all this weirdness I realized it was time to revamp Platypus. Danny, Trey and I spent hours deconstructing and literally imploding the original arrangement to the point of superimposing the "verse" with the "chorus". I think that's still my proudest lyrical input. And Bär (!) finally stopped referring to Bungle as "you guys" and started writing for the band.

== Composition ==
Disco Volante is regarded as Mr. Bungle's most experimental album. Categorized primarily as experimental rock, avant-garde metal, and jazz fusion, many of the songs jump between multiple genres, including sludge metal ("Everyone I Went to High School With Is Dead"), death metal ("Carry Stress in the Jaw", "Merry Go Bye Bye"), Arabic music ("Desert Search for Techno Allah"), musique concrète and tango ("Violenza Domestica"), twelve-tone serialism ("Phlegmatics"), klezmer ("Ma Meeshka Mow Skwoz", "Platypus"), noise ("The Bends"), and easy listening (″Backstrokin'″).

Although many of the album's lyrics are limited ("Carry Stress in the Jaw", "Phlegmatics"), in non-English languages ("Desert Search for Techno Allah", "Violenza Domestica") or constructed from nonsense words ("Ma Meeshka Mow Skwoz", "Chemical Marriage"), the lyrical content of Disco Volante is, as on their eponymous debut album, both dark and comedic. Lyrical themes include social isolation ("Everyone I Went to High School With Is Dead"), bruxism ("Carry Stress in the Jaw"), child abuse ("After School Special"), domestic violence ("Violenza Domestica"), the "gradual decline of the human body due to social interactions" ("Phlegmatics"), masturbation ("Backstrokin'"), and martyrdom ("Merry Go Bye Bye"). "The Bends" is a largely instrumental ten-minute suite split into ten different sections, detailing the experiences of a negligent diver who experiences decompression sickness.

"Carry Stress in the Jaw" and "Phlegmatics" are parts two and three of Dunn's "Sleep" trilogy, with "Slowly Growing Deaf" on the band's debut being retroactively designated as part one.

Both "Carry Stress in the Jaw" and "Merry Go Bye Bye" feature untitled hidden tracks. The first is sometimes referred to as "The Secret Song" (after a prominent lyric) or "Spy" (used to denote the song on the band's set lists). The second is sometimes called "Nothing", due to a joke in the liner notes. On vinyl pressings, the album is double grooved and the first hidden track is in the second groove alongside "Carry Stress in the Jaw", which is notoriously difficult to accurately locate. On CD pressings, the hidden track appears after "Carry Stress in the Jaw" on the same track. It was originally recorded without Dunn's input or knowledge, though he later found the recording and added a vocal part. Dunn believes that drums on the track were played by McKinnon, keyboards by Heifetz, and bass guitar by Patton. The freely improvised hidden track after "Merry Go Bye Bye" begins at 7:21, after a full minute of silence. Neither track is mentioned in any way on the album packaging.

Disco Volante spawned a number of officially unreleased demos (circulated on internet peer-to-peer sharing networks): "Ma Meeshka Mow Skwoz", "Coldsore" and "Spy". "Coldsore", one of woodwind player and keyboardist Clinton McKinnon's first compositions for the band, would be adapted into the "Love on the Event Horizon" section of "The Bends"; McKinnon's band Ümlaut, featuring Heifetz, would release a new recording of the original track in 2025.

== Reception ==
Professional ratings
Review scores
Source	Rating
AllMusic	4.5/5 stars
Collector's Guide to Heavy Metal	7/10

In a highly favorable review of the album, Greg Prato of AllMusic described Mr. Bungle's music as "the musical equivalent of a David Lynch movie", performed in a "totally original and new musical style...that sounds like nothing that currently exists." Stylus Magazine wrote in their 2005 review of the album that "a decade later, Disco Volante still sounds daring." In a negative review, Mark Sutherland of NME wrote that the album was "70 minutes of irredeemable excrement" that failed at being music.

=== Accolades ===
Year	Publication	Country	Accolade	Rank
2006	Rock Sound	United Kingdom	"Les 150 Albums De La Génération"	69
"*" denotes an unordered list.

== Track listing ==
No.	Title	Lyrics	Music	Length
1.	"Everyone I Went to High School With Is Dead"	Trevor Dunn	Dunn	2:45
2.	"Chemical Marriage"		Trey Spruance	3:09
3.	"Carry Stress in the Jaw": 1. Sleep (Part II): "Carry Stress in the Jaw"; 2. "The Secret Song/Spy"	Dunn, Edgar Allan Poe ("Carry Stress in the Jaw")	Dunn ("Carry Stress in the Jaw")	8:59: 1. 4:43; 2. 4:16
4.	"Desert Search for Techno Allah"	Spruance	Spruance, Mike Patton	5:24
5.	"Violenza Domestica"	Patton	Patton, Spruance	5:14
6.	"After School Special"	Clinton McKinnon, Dunn, Patton	McKinnon	2:47
7.	"Sleep (Part III): Phlegmatics"	Dunn	Dunn	3:16
8.	"Ma Meeshka Mow Skwoz"	Spruance	Spruance	6:06
9.	"The Bends": 1. "Man Overboard"; 2. "The Drowning Flute"; 3. "Aqua Swing"; 4. "Follow the Bubbles"; 5. "Duet for Guitar and Oxygen Tank"; 6. "Nerve Damage"; 7. "Screaming Bends"; 8. "Panic in Blue"; 9. "Love on the Event Horizon"; 10. "Re-Entry"		Patton, Spruance, McKinnon	10:28: 1. 0:41; 2. 0:52; 3. 1:56; 4. 0:14; 5. 0:51; 6. 0:38; 7. 0:40; 8. 0:57; 9. 1:29; 10. 1:46
10.	"Backstrokin'"	Patton	Patton	2:27
11.	"Platypus"	Dunn	Dunn, Spruance	5:07
12.	"Merry Go Bye Bye" ("Merry Go Bye Bye" ends at 6:21; hidden track "Noises" begins after 1 minute of silence)	Spruance	Spruance	12:58
Total length:				68:40

== Personnel ==
Mr. Bungle

- I Quit – "a woodblock", drums, percussion, production and sleeve art layout and design
- Trevor Dunn – bass guitar, double bass, violin, production and sleeve art layout and design
- Uncooked Meat Prior to State Vector Collapse – electric guitar, keyboards, electronics, pípá, production and sleeve art layout and design
- Clinton McKinnon – tenor saxophone, clarinet, keyboards (6), drums (5), production and sleeve art layout and design
- Patton – vocals, microcassette, organ (9, 10), ocarina (3), production and sleeve art layout and design
- Theo – alto saxophone and E-flat clarinet (credited as "E♭ reeds piped in from Ithaca"), production and sleeve art layout and design

Additional personnel

- William Winant – cymbals on "Chemical Marriage", bongos on "Sleep (Part II): Carry Stress in the Jaw", tabla, kanjira and sistrums on "Desert Search for Techno Allah", jaw harp and percussion on "Violenzia Domestica" and bongos, xylophone and glockenspiel on "Ma Meeshka Mow Skwoz"
- Graham Connah – piano on "Violenza Domestica", "The Bends" and "Platypus"
- Lisandro Adrover – bandoneón on "Violenza Domestica"

Technical personnel

- Chris Roberts – engineering
- Mike Bogus – engineering
- David Ogilvy – engineering
- Adam Munoz – engineering
- Trevor Ward – engineering
- Bernie Grundman – mastering
- Athur Hertz – album front cover photography
- Joseph A. Thompson – album outer tray photography
- Davis Meltzer – album booklet backpage photography
- Margaret Murray – sleeve art layout and design
- Gregg Turkington – sleeve art layout and design
- Billy Anderson – engineering, mixing and pre-mastering
- Mike Johnson – engineering and pre-mastering
- Kevin Donlon – engineering
