= Mr. Bungle (album) =

Studio album by Mr. Bungle
- Released: August 13, 1991
- Recorded: 1990–1991
- Studios: Different Fur, San Francisco, California, United States
- Genres: Funk metal; experimental rock; alternative metal; ska; avant-garde jazz
- Length: 73:15
- Label: Warner Bros.
- Producers: Mr. Bungle; John Zorn

Mr. Bungle chronology
OU818 (demo) (1989)	Mr. Bungle (1991)	Disco Volante (1995)

Singles from Mr. Bungle
- 1. "Quote Unquote" Released: 1991

Mr. Bungle is the debut studio album by American experimental rock band Mr. Bungle. It was released on August 13, 1991, through Warner Bros. Records. The album contains many genre shifts which are typical of the band, and helped increase the band's popularity, gaining them a cult following.

== Composition and lyrics ==
Mr. Bungle mixes a variety of musical styles, primarily funk metal, avant-rock, alternative metal, ska and avant-garde jazz, but also elements of avant-garde metal, circus music, heavy metal, free jazz, and funk. Steve Huey AllMusic called the album's musical style a "dizzying, disconcerting, schizophrenic tour through just about any rock style the group can think of, hopping from genre to genre without any apparent rhyme or reason, and sometimes doing so several times in the same song", and Mike Patton's lyrics as "even more bizarrely humorous" and "less self-censored" than those of Faith No More. Warner Bros. promoted the record as Patton's "seriously weird new project".

The lyrics in the album are broad in themes, ranging from more comedic to dark or sexual. "Slowly Growing Deaf" was "inspired by the ironic need to wear earplugs while listening to music and also people’s inability to listen", according to bassist Trevor Dunn, and was later designated as part one of his "Sleep" trilogy, with the other two being featured on the band’s second album in 1995. "Squeeze Me Macaroni" is a song featuring strong sexual themes being illustrated through food metaphors. "Egg" is about asociality. "Stubb (A Dub)" is about Trey Spruance's dog, Stubb. "The Girls of Porn" is about pornography and masturbation. "Love is a Fist" is about domestic violence. "Dead Goon" is about an asphyxiophile whose actions lead to his accidental death.

Samples from David Lynch's 1986 film Blue Velvet are strewn throughout the album. Other samples include KFC commercial outtakes, items from the video games Super Mario Bros., Smash TV, and R.B.I. Baseball, the movie Sharon's Sex Party, and the pinball games Cyclone, Earthshaker, and Haunted House.

== Artwork ==
The album cover features artwork by Dan Sweetman, originally published in the story "A Cotton Candy Autopsy" in the comic book series Beautiful Stories for Ugly Children.

== Critical reception ==
Professional ratings
Review scores
Source	Rating
AllMusic	4.5/5 stars
Collector's Guide to Heavy Metal	8/10
Entertainment Weekly	D−
Kerrang!	4/5 stars
NME	1/10

The album received mixed reviews upon release. Entertainment Weekly gave the album a highly negative review, writing: "Adjectives like 'puerile' and 'unlistenable' take on entirely new dimensions when applied to Mr. Bungle". In contrast, Trouser Press called it "one of the most ambitiously random, fractious records in recent memory" and "one of the finest records of its kind".

=== Legacy ===
In 2015, Korn guitarist James "Munky" Shaffer praised the album, stating: "I loved their last album, California, but their self-titled debut had the biggest impact on me. There’s a song on there called "Love Is a Fist" that's fucking crushing. That set the tone for us and what we went on to do creatively. They were completely outside the box and just didn't care – they satisfied only themselves. It wasn't about record sales, it was just about creating a band."

Synyster Gates of Avenged Sevenfold has named the album as "one of the most incredible pieces of music [he has] ever heard in [his] life". In 2021, Incubus vocalist Brandon Boyd stated that he loved how "irreverent and disgusting and scary the music was" at the time. Boyd and Incubus later toured with Mr. Bungle at the 2000 edition of the SnoCore Tour. When asked about the album's influence on bands such as Korn and Incubus, Spruance said in 2021, "often I feel that the public that took to this album had pre-existing mental problems that the wide distribution of the CD only exacerbated." Saxophonist Bär McKinnon was asked the same question in 2021, and reflected, "it's an honour that bands and musicians name-check us. But it doesn't make me feel like a king or anything!".

== Track listing ==
All songs are credited to Mr. Bungle. Actual writers below, according to ASCAP.

No.	Title	Writer(s)	Length
1.	"Travolta" (retitled "Quote Unquote" on later pressings)	Trevor Dunn, Danny Heifetz, Mike Patton, Trey Spruance	6:56
2.	"Slowly Growing Deaf"	Dunn, Heifetz, Patton, Spruance, Clinton McKinnon, Theo Lengyel	6:58
3.	"Squeeze Me Macaroni"	Dunn, Heifetz, Patton, Spruance	5:38
4.	"Carousel"	Dunn, Heifetz, Patton, Spruance	5:13
5.	"Egg"	Dunn	10:40
6.	"Stubb (A Dub)"	Dunn, Heifetz, Patton, Spruance, McKinnon, Lengyel	7:19
7.	"My Ass Is on Fire"	Dunn, Heifetz, Patton, Spruance	7:47
8.	"The Girls of Porn"	Dunn, Heifetz, Patton, Spruance, McKinnon, Lengyel	6:42
9.	"Love Is a Fist"	Dunn, Spruance	6:00
10.	"Dead Goon"	Dunn, Heifetz, Patton, Spruance, McKinnon, Lengyel	10:02
Total length:			73:15

Three more songs ("Mr Nice Guy", "Thunderball", and "Platypus") were also recorded for the album, but were cut at the last minute; a revised version of "Platypus" would appear on the band's second album, Disco Volante.

== Personnel ==
Credits adapted from the album's liner notes.

=== Mr. Bungle ===
- Vlad Drac – vocals, keyboards, production
- Scummy – electric guitar, keyboards, production
- Trevor Roy Dunn – bass guitar, production
- Bär – tenor saxophone, keyboards, production
- Theobald Brooks Lengyel – alto saxophone, baritone saxophone, production
- Heifetz – drums, production

=== Additional personnel ===
- Yeesus Krist – backing vocals
- Maximum Bob – backing vocals
- Kahli – backing vocals
- Jennifer – backing vocals
- David Shea – turntables
- John Zorn – alto saxophone on "Love Is a Fist", production

=== Technical personnel ===
- Matt Murman – engineering assistance, digital editing
- David Bryson – engineering, mixing
- Bob Ludwig – mastering
- Anthony Lee – album sleeve design
- Lisa Wells – band logo typeset
- David Louapre – album cover and interior art
- Dan Sweetman – cover and interior art
- Jay Marshall – cover and interior art
- P. Earwig – inside double panel art
