= Travolta (song) =

"Travolta (Quote Unquote)"

Promotional single by Mr. Bungle

from the album Mr. Bungle
- Released: 1991
- Genre: Avant-garde metal; funk metal
- Length: 6:56 (album version); 4:31 (single version)
- Label: Warner Bros.
- Songwriters: Trey Spruance; Trevor Dunn; Mike Patton
- Producers: Mr. Bungle; John Zorn

Mr. Bungle singles chronology
"Travolta (Quote Unquote)" (1991)	""Platypus" (promotional release)" (1995)

"Travolta (Quote Unquote)" (1991)
Sample from Mr. Bungle's "Travolta (Quote Unquote)" from the album Mr. Bungle.

"Travolta" (later retitled "Quote Unquote") is a song by the American experimental rock band Mr. Bungle, released in 1991 as the opening track and promotional single from their self-titled debut album.

== Controversy ==
Although the song was originally titled "Travolta", it was quickly changed to "Quote Unquote" due to legal threats. The song's music video, directed by Kevin Kerslake, was banned from MTV due to its images of the band members hanging from meat hooks.

== Lyrics ==
AllMusic believes the song to be a tribute to John Travolta and fellow actor Patrick Swayze, although it also contains references to Adolf Hitler. A biography of Travolta by Bob McCabe was titled Quote, Unquote after the song. The main theme from the 1978 film Grease, in which Travolta starred, is interpolated twice in the song.

Mr. Bungle guitarist and "Travolta" co-writer Trey Spruance elaborated on the song's meaning in a 2016 interview:

Travolta's lyric concept (which was very well redacted by Patton), came about in a very unique way. There was a spontaneous brainstorm by the whole band during a long night drive somewhere. For some reason we were obsessing on the hypothetical inner experience of a person who lacks almost all sensory input (deaf, blind, limbless and with mouth sewn shut). Everything he experiences is tunnelled through a highly developed, almost miraculously compensatory sense of smell. He is thrown onto a trampoline – by who? a sick torturer laughing at him? loving parents attempting to provide something joyful that "normal" kids do? How would it matter in either case? As you might expect from a bunch of alienated teenage delinquent heshers pondering over such questions, we were in collective hysterics over all of this. The truth, though, looking back is that we very much identified with this tragically monstrous character, who in his extreme sensory isolation was effectively living outside of time and space. I say this now, but 400 miles from anywhere, pre-internet, we were receiving our cultural referents in a way that could be compared to breathing through a tiny straw. And in some way, therefore, we were therefore free from their actual influence, free to imagine them any way we wanted to. We weren't thinking this about ourselves at the time, but the Travolta figure exemplifies the idea that when left only with one's imagination, and some vague other impressions from far off, such a suffocated entity might not feel deprived so much as take advantage of the elasticity of his state. To become something of a shapeshifter. In our adolescent gloom, therefore, "Travolta" would of course take on the identities of various megalomaniacs; Hitler and Trump are mentioned, and there's something prescient there about pathological narcissism mixing with the unbounded entrepreneurial spirit, peppered with a life mission of compensatory revenge.

— Trey Spruance

== Track listing ==
1. "Quote Unquote" (single edit) – 4:31
2. "Quote Unquote" (album version) – 6:56
