= Trick My Truck =

- 2008 series logo
- Genre: Reality television
- Starring: Kelvin Locklear; Rob Richardson; Ryan Templeton; Matt Moore; Steve Harrah; Allen Harrah
- Composer: John Swihart
- Country of origin: United States
- Original language: English
- No. of seasons: 5
- No. of episodes: 59

Production
- Executive producers: Jason Morgan; Melanie Moreau; Rob Zazzali; Al Bazzy
- Producer: Todd Lewis
- Cinematography: Keith J. Duggan; Dan Farnam
- Running time: 30 minutes
- Production company: Varuna Entertainment

Original release
- Network: CMT
- Release: February 3, 2006 – April 25, 2009

Trick My Truck is an American reality television program that premiered on February 3, 2006, on CMT. It is a spinoff of the MTV series Pimp My Ride. Created by Varuna Films, the series features a group of truck mechanics who overhaul trucks of "deserving" owners in response to letters and calls from the owner's relatives and/or friends.

== Premise ==
Each episode begins with the crew of mechanics (known as the "Chrome Shop Mafia" in Seasons 1-3 only) playing or having fun. Their foreman and lead designer interrupt and tell them they have a truck (primarily a tractor unit) to "trick". The foreman and lead designer also tell the crew about the truck and its owner's occupation (primarily trucking); the crew agrees to "trick" the truck. Stories about the truck owner are told by their relatives and/or friends. The crew looks for the truck and when they find it, they surprise the owner and tell them they will "trick" their truck as requested by their relatives and/or friends. The crew takes the truck to their shop (Chrome Shop Mafia in Joplin, Missouri in Seasons 1-3; K&L Chrome Shop in Florence, South Carolina in Seasons 4 and 5) and the owner is given a loaner truck (from Ryder in Seasons 1 and 2; J. B. Hunt in Seasons 3 and 4; Hino in Season 5) to drive in the meantime.

At the shop, the truck is "tricked", or overhauled, based on the owner's occupation and/or hobbies. Modifications to the truck typically include new paint, accessories, electronics (typically a TV), and a redesigned interior. Most changes are only cosmetic and mechanical work is rarely shown.

When the crew is finished with the truck, the owner goes to the shop, where the crew shows and tells them what they did to their truck. Each episode ends with the crew cheering as the owner leaves the shop in their "tricked" truck.

In addition to tractor units, the crew has "tricked" pickup trucks and various specialty trucks such as tow trucks and an ice cream truck.

== Cast ==
- Kelvin Locklear - Lead Designer (Seasons 4 and 5)
- Rob Richardson - Interior (Season 3), Audio/Video (Seasons 4 and 5)
- Ryan "Ryno" Templeton - Paint
- Matt Moore - Customizer (Seasons 4 and 5)
- Steve Harrah - Shop Foreman (Seasons 4 and 5)
- Allen Harrah - Customizer (Seasons 4 and 5)

=== Previous cast ===
- Rod Pickett - Lead Designer (Seasons 1-3)
- Kevin "Ice Pick" Pickett - Shop Foreman (Seasons 1-3)
- Bryan Martin - "Bossman" (Seasons 1-3)
- C.B. Grimes - Chrome (Seasons 1-3)
- Rick "Scrapyard Dog" Stone - Demolition (Season 3)
- Scott Draeger
- Scott St. Germain (Seasons 1 and 2)

== Spinoff ==
A spinoff of Trick My Truck called Trick My Trucker premiered on CMT on November 10, 2007. The show features "trucker makeovers" in which out-of-shape truck drivers learn how to work out, eat healthier foods, and improve their appearance. The show is hosted by Bob Guiney and features trainer Aaron Aguilera and stylist Harmonie Krieger.

== Reception ==
In a negative review, Common Sense Media reviewer Sierra Filucci wrote that the show's "dialogue feels scripted and their delivery is lifeless, making for less-appealing characters than some of the other, more personality-driven shows." She thought that "some of the jokes included to lighten things up fall flat or just seem corny." Jennifer Hall of the St. Joseph News-Press compared the show to Extreme Makeover: Home Edition and thought it "tells the unique stories of over-the-road truck drivers across the nation". Regarding the improvements to the trucks, she said, "The updates take place in a short amount of time, adding suspense to the final product."
