= Mr. Bungle =

American experimental rock band

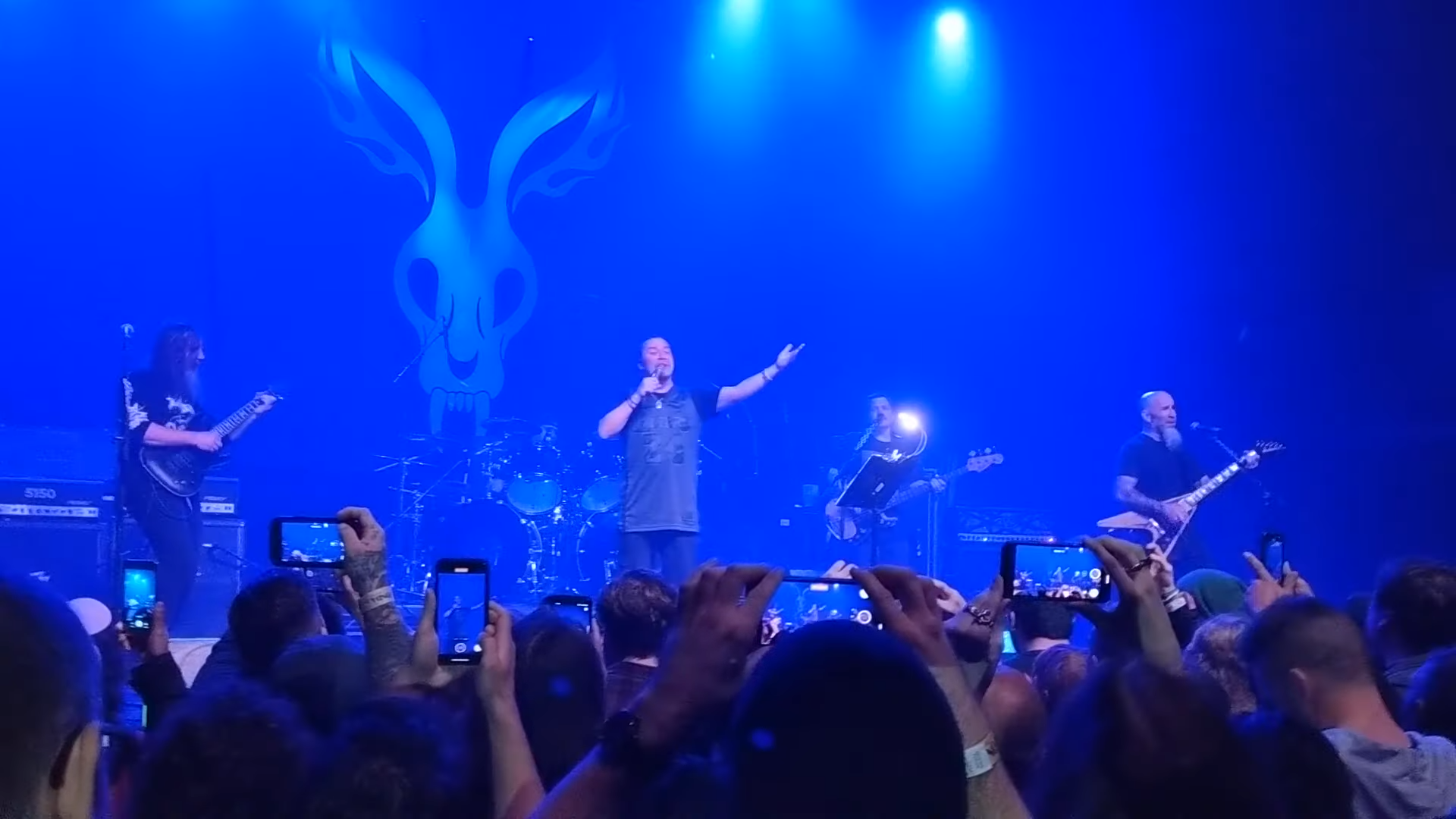
- Mr. Bungle performing in 2020

Background information
- Origin: Eureka, California, U.S.
- Genres: Experimental rock; alternative metal; funk metal; avant-garde metal
- Years active: 1985–2000; 2019–present
- Labels: Warner Bros.; Ipecac
- Spinoffs: Fantômas
- Members: Mike Patton; Trey Spruance; Trevor Dunn; Scott Ian; Dave Lombardo
- Past members: Theo Lengyel; Jed Watts; Luke Miller; Scott Fritz; Hans Wagner; Danny Heifetz; Clinton "Bär" McKinnon
- Website: mrbungle.com

Mr. Bungle is an American experimental rock band formed in Eureka, California, in 1985. Having gone through many incarnations throughout its career, the band is best known for its experimental rock period. During this time, it developed a highly eclectic style, cycling through several musical genres, often within the course of a single song, including heavy metal, avant-garde jazz, ska, disco, and funk, further enhanced by frontman Mike Patton's versatile singing style. This period also saw the band utilizing unconventional song structures and samples; playing a wide array of instruments; obscuring the members' identities and dressing up in masks, jumpsuits, and other costumes; and performing a diverse selection of cover songs during live performances.

The band was founded as a death metal project while the members were in high school. It is named after a character in the 1960 children's educational film Beginning Responsibility: Lunchroom Manners, as featured in the 1981 HBO special The Pee-wee Herman Show. Mr. Bungle released four demo tapes in the mid-to-late 1980s. On the back of Patton's success as frontman of Faith No More, the band was signed to Warner Bros. Records in 1990 and released three studio albums between 1991 and 1999 in the eclectic, experimental style it became known for. The band toured in 1999 and 2000 to support its third album before going on an indefinite hiatus that was confirmed as a dissolution in 2004. It reunited as a thrash metal band for a series of shows in February 2020 to perform its 1986 demo album The Raging Wrath of the Easter Bunny with Anthrax guitarist Scott Ian and former Slayer drummer Dave Lombardo. The band then returned to the studio to re-record the demo as a professional album, released in October of that year.

Mr. Bungle has gone through numerous lineup changes, with Patton, guitarist Trey Spruance, and bassist Trevor Dunn the sole consistent members. The band was based in San Francisco during its tenure with Warner Bros. During much of the band's existence, it was in a public dispute with Red Hot Chili Peppers, particularly between Patton and Chili Peppers vocalist Anthony Kiedis.

== History ==
=== Formation (1985–1989) ===
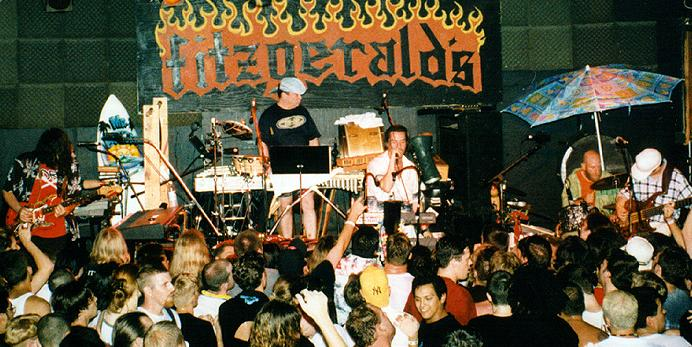
Mr. Bungle live in 1999 during the ''California'' Tour

Mr. Bungle emerged after its members were kicked out of their respective previous bands. "It was kinda like a merger between two bands," Mike Patton recalled. "One really horrible gothic metal band, which our guitarist and original drummer were in, and one really horrible metal band which did Metallica covers, which is the one Trevor and me came from." Mr. Bungle initially described themselves as a death metal band, but also dabbled in speed metal, thrash metal, and hardcore punk. The members came very close to naming the band Summer Breeze before settling on the name Mr. Bungle. The Mr. Bungle name was inspired by a 1950s propaganda film that they had seen as a segment of The Pee-wee Herman Show. The members previously used the name to refer to a classmate that they thought to be "a total goober" before adopting it as their band's name.

Within a year of formation, the band expanded their sound to include ska. Trevor Dunn noted in 1991: "After about a year we got tired of playing speed metal and wanted to do something a little more creative. So we just stopped and started writing our own style of music, which was influenced by bands like Camper Van Beethoven, Oingo Boingo, Bad Manners and kind of funky, ska-oriented stuff. Then we added a two-piece horn section and a new drummer, so now we don't really have any kind of limit on the music we play." Trey Spruance corroborated this: "When I was 15, I was in a death metal group," Spruance reminisced. "We had this idea that we were going to play a bunch of ska tunes for a bunch of metalheads. We just had this idea, you know: 'Okay, we're going to play this ska music, and that'll be amazing.' Half of the audience hated us, but there was definitely a joy in confronting that wall between styles."

Given that the band's background was exclusively in heavy music at that point, some band members experienced difficulties expanding their sound early on. In particular, Spruance noted that Mike Patton had to teach him to play the ska stroke for a performance at their high school talent show. Spruance later explained, "Oh, what I remember was... this was our first... like, we had only done, uh, death metal up to that point. And so this was our first time trying to ever play ska. And I'd never played... on guitar, like, I'd never played... I didn't know how to do that skanking guitar shit at all. But Patton could do, like with one finger on the thread mark, he could do the, the rhythmic part of it pretty well. Like, he could... he taught me how to do it. So, I just sort of awkwardly... I would fill in and make the chord and he actually played guitar, but would just kind of use it percussively. And we played these Camper Van Beethoven songs, and I don't... I dunno if we played The Specials, but that's what we were listening to."

Mr. Bungle played their first show in November 1985 at the Bayside Grange Hall in Bayside, California. The band's first demo, The Raging Wrath of the Easter Bunny, was recorded during Easter of 1986. It featured a fast, lo-fi death/thrash metal sound, with touches of ska. Instruments utilized on the album included a train whistle, saxophone, bongos and a kazoo. The Raging Wrath of the Easter Bunny was followed in 1987 by the Bowel of Chiley demo; it featured a much greater ska presence, as well as the sounds of jazz, swing and funk. Bradley Torreano noted at AllMusic that the recording was "essentially the sound of some very talented teenagers trying to make their love of jazz and ska come together in whatever way they can." In 1988, Mike Patton became the lead vocalist for Faith No More, getting the job after the band heard him on the first Mr. Bungle demo. Patton continued to be a member of both bands simultaneously and Mr. Bungle released its third demo, Goddammit I Love America!, later in 1988, which was musically similar to Bowel of Chiley. Mike Patton described its style as "funkadelic, thrashing, circus, ska." OU818, their final demo tape, was recorded in June 1989. OU818, was the first release to feature both tenor sax player Clinton "Bär" McKinnon and drummer Danny Heifetz. At the time of this release, Mike Patton described Mr. Bungle as a "weirdo funk band".

=== Mr. Bungle (1990–1993) ===
"Travolta (Quote Unquote)" (1991)
Sample from Mr. Bungle's "Travolta (Quote Unquote)" from the album Mr. Bungle. It was Mr. Bungle's only song to ever receive a music video until 2020.

During 1990, the band members left Eureka for San Francisco in search of greater musical opportunities. Trey Spruance said the change in location influenced the band's style, remarking "[we were interested in] Slayer and Mercyful Fate. Later it was The Specials and Fishbone. Then we moved to San Francisco and got all sophisticated. Now we are improv snobs who rule the avant-garde universe by night, and poor, fucked-up hipsters by day." Having established a following in Northern California, Mr. Bungle was signed to Warner Bros. Records in 1990, with the label releasing all three of their studio albums during the 1990s. It has been speculated that Patton's success as frontman of Faith No More was the primary reason Warner Bros. signed the band. The Los Angeles Times stated in a 1991 article that "Under normal circumstances, you'd have to describe Mr. Bungle's chances of landing a major label deal as... a long shot."

Their debut album, Mr. Bungle, was produced by jazz experimentalist John Zorn and was released on August 13, 1991. The cover featured artwork by Dan Sweetman, originally published in the story "A Cotton Candy Autopsy" in the DC Comics/Piranha Press imprint title Beautiful Stories for Ugly Children. The record mixed metal, funk, ska, carnival music and free jazz, but was normally described as funk metal by music critics. It received mostly positive reviews, with journalist Bill Pahnelas calling it "an incredible musical tour de force". On the style of the album, critic Steve Huey wrote in AllMusic: "Mr. Bungle is a dizzying, disconcerting, schizophrenic tour through just about any rock style the group can think of, hopping from genre to genre without any apparent rhyme or reason, and sometimes doing so several times in the same song."

The "MB" Mr. Bungle logo, a parody of the famous "WB" logo used by their record label Warner Bros.

The album's first track and sole single was originally titled "Travolta". At Warner Brothers' encouragement, it was renamed "Quote Unquote" in later pressings, due to fears regarding a potential lawsuit by John Travolta. The band created a music video for the song, directed by Kevin Kerslake. However, MTV refused to air the video because of images of bodies dangling on meat hooks. The album sold well despite MTV refusing to air their video and a lack of radio airplay. Almost all the members went by obscure aliases in the album credits. To promote the album in some stores, a Mr. Bungle bubble bath was given away with copies of the record sold. Following the release of the album, the band toured North America.

=== Disco Volante (1994–1997) ===
"Desert Search For Techno Allah" (1995)
Sample from Mr. Bungle's "Desert Search For Techno Allah" from the album Disco Volante. This track displays a blend of Middle Eastern music and techno with the parts of the lyrics being taken from an old Arabic phrase.

Due to artwork delays and the band members' many side-projects, it was four years before Disco Volante was released, in October 1995. The new album displayed musical development and a shift in tone from their earlier recordings. While the self-titled album was described as "funk metal", with Disco Volante this label was replaced with "avant-garde" or "experimental".

The music was complex and unpredictable, with the band continuing with their shifts of musical style. Some of the tracks were in foreign languages and would radically change genres mid-song. Featuring lyrics about death, suicide and child abuse, along with children's songs and a Middle Eastern techno number, music critic Greg Prato described the album as having "a totally original and new musical style that sounds like nothing that currently exists". Not all critics were impressed with the album, with The Washington Post describing it as "an album of cheesy synthesizers, mangled disco beats, virtuosic playing and juvenile noises", calling it "self-indulgent" and adding that "Mr. Bungle's musicians like to show off their classical, jazz and world-beat influences in fast, difficult passages which are technically impressive but never seem to go anywhere". Additionally, writer Scott McGaughey described it as "difficult", and was critical of its "lack of actual songs". Disco Volante included influences from contemporary classical music, avant-garde jazz, electronic music pioneer Pierre Henry, Edgar Allan Poe, John Zorn, Krzysztof Penderecki, and European film music of the 1960s and 1970s, such as those composed by Ennio Morricone and Peter Thomas. The album notes also contained an invitation to participate in an "unusual scam" – if $2 was sent to the band's address, participants would receive additional artwork, lyrics to the songs "Ma Meeshka Mow Skwoz" and "Chemical Marriage" and some stickers. The vinyl release of this album shipped with a 7" by the then-unknown Secret Chiefs 3.

Mr. Bungle supported Disco Volante with their first world tour, performing across North America, Europe and Australia during 1995 and 1996. After this tour, founding member and original saxophone player and keyboardist Theo Lengyel left the band due to creative differences.

In early 1997, the band began work on a covers album, but it was put on indefinite hold due to Patton's touring commitments with Faith No More. Later in 1997, the Seattle-based Rastacore Records started distributing CDs of Bowel of Chiley (incorrectly labelled Bowl of Chiley on the Rastacore release). This was done without official authorization from Mr. Bungle or Warner Bros., and as such production was halted, with only a limited number of CDs surviving.

=== California (1998–2000) ===
"Vanity Fair" (1999)
Sample from Mr. Bungle's "Vanity Fair" from the album California. This clip illustrates one of Mr. Bungle's doo-wop–inspired songs.

After a two-year break, which saw Faith No More split, Mr. Bungle reconvened in 1998 to record new material. The band's third album, California, was released on July 13, 1999. Ground and Sky reviews have described California as Mr. Bungle's most accessible and, while the band's signature genre shifts are still present, they are less frequent, with succinct song formats resulting in an album that the Associated Press called "surprisingly linear". AllMusic called the record "their most concise album to date; and while the song structures are far from traditional, they're edging more in that direction, and that greatly helps the listener in making sense of the often random-sounding juxtapositions of musical genres". Of the different style of this album, Patton said that to the band "the record is pop-y", before adding "...but to some fucking No Doubt fan in Ohio, they're not going to swallow that." The album was generally well-received, with music critic Robert Everett-Green writing, "The band's newest and greatest album does not reveal itself quickly, but once the bug bites, there is no cure. The best disc of the year, by a length."

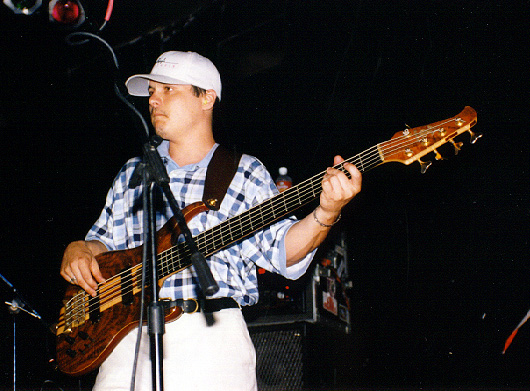
Trevor Dunn in concert supporting California

The recording process for California was more complex than for the band's previous records. It chose to record the album to analog tape rather than digitally and some songs required several 24-track machines, utilizing over 50 tracks. As a result, each song contains layers of original samples, keyboards, percussion and melodies. The album displays influences from Burt Bacharach and The Beach Boys, while blending lounge, pop, doo-wop, jazz, funk, exotica, thrash metal, Hawaiian, Middle Eastern, alternative metal, surf music, kecak, and avant-garde music.

The band toured North America, Australia and Europe to support the record. They also appeared on the 2000 edition of the SnoCore Tour, performing alongside alternative metal acts it had influenced, such as Incubus and System of a Down. According to Dunn, Mr. Bungle was "completely out of place" on the SnoCore Tour. He said: "We were sort of the grandpas of the tour, so we started really messing with the audiences. We dressed up like the Village People and acted super gay which really pissed off the metal kids."

Mr. Bungle played its last concert in nearly 20 years on September 9, 2000, in Nottingham, England. Following the California tour, the members again went their separate ways to pursue their various side projects. During the early 2000s, Patton was primarily touring and recording with his metal project Fantômas (which also featured Dunn) and the newly formed supergroup Tomahawk. Mr. Bungle was assumed to be in another period of "hibernation", with Patton telling Kerrang! in October 2001 that "it's gotta take a rest. There's a few of us that aren't even ready to face it again for a while. We'll put it on the shelf for now and see what happens to it and hopefully revisit it again." However, Patton announced in a 2004 interview with Rolling Stone that the group had disbanded.

=== Post-breakup events (2000–2019) ===
After the dissolution of Mr. Bungle, the members went on to numerous different projects. Patton co-founded the record label Ipecac Recordings and is involved with several other ventures, including various works with composer John Zorn and the bands Fantômas, Tomahawk, Lovage and Peeping Tom. Patton also collaborated with The Dillinger Escape Plan in 2002 on their EP Irony Is A Dead Scene. In 2004, Björk, an experimental artist from Iceland, called upon him to provide vocal work on her album Medúlla. He acted in the motion picture Firecracker, narrated the film Bunraku, and did voice work in the movie I Am Legend, performing the screams and howls of the infected humans. He also did zombie and other character voices in the game Left 4 Dead (as well as the growls for the anger core in the game Portal). In 2009 and 2010, Patton embarked on a world tour with Faith No More after it reunited. Spruance is involved with various bands, including Secret Chiefs 3 and Faxed Head. Dunn joined Patton in Fantômas and Tomahawk, and formed a jazz band, Trevor Dunn's Trio Convulsant; he also occasionally played bass with Secret Chiefs 3. Heifetz's projects included playing with Secret Chiefs 3 and in the country/punk band Dieselhed; he now resides in Sydney, and plays in outfits such as The Exiles, The Tango Saloon and The Fantastic Terrific Munkle. McKinnon also played with Secret Chiefs 3. In 2002, he moved to Melbourne, Australia, after getting into a relationship with an Australian woman he met at a 2000 Mr. Bungle concert in Sydney. Following his move to Melbourne, he went on to play with The Ribbon Device and Umläut.

Spruance joined Patton and Faith No More onstage for the first time to perform King for a Day... Fool for a Lifetime in its entirety in Santiago in November 2011. Patton sang on the Secret Chiefs 3 song "La Chanson de Jacky" in 2012, provoking further speculation by fans about a reunion. But in a February 2013 interview with SF Weekly, Dunn said there would be no Mr. Bungle reunion: "I've heard the faintest murmurings about it, but honestly I don't think anyone is interested. It's nothing personal, either. We all feel like that band said what it needed to say. It would feel weird and awkward to play that music again. It would take a pant-load of money to make it happen, and honestly, I don't want to do it for that reason. I would prefer to let go of it, respectfully." When asked about Mr. Bungle reuniting in an interview published in February 2014, Patton responded! "Who knows? It certainly doesn't seem like it's on the tip of anyone's lips, but I could have said the same thing—and in fact, I did say the same thing—about Faith No More, and that happened. And I think it happened for the better." Around this time, the book The Faith No More & Mr. Bungle Companion was released, which covered both bands' histories.

=== Reunion and The Raging Wrath of the Easter Bunny Demo (2019–present) ===
On August 13, 2019, it was announced that Mr. Bungle would reunite in February 2020 for three shows in Los Angeles, San Francisco and Brooklyn. The reunion was promoted as featuring Patton, Spruance and Dunn, as well as guitarist Scott Ian and drummer Dave Lombardo, performing The Raging Wrath of the Easter Bunny in its entirety. On August 15, after a strong demand for tickets for all three shows, the band added an additional show to each city. A third L.A. show was added on August 21, bringing the total number of reunion shows to seven. The band wrote on its Facebook page that it would not perform any songs from its Warner Bros. albums.

During the reunion shows, Mr. Bungle covered songs of various metal and hardcore punk bands such as Slayer, Corrosion of Conformity, Circle Jerks, Crumbsuckers and Cro-Mags in addition to performing three previously unreleased songs written during the era of The Raging Wrath of the Easter Bunny: "Glutton For Punishment", "Methamatics", and "Eracist". Although the entire recording was promoted as being performed, non-metal songs from the demo (such as "Grizzly Adams" and "Evil Satan") were absent from the performances. The only exception was "Hypocrites", albeit with the ska sections eliminated.

The choice of songs received a mixed reaction from certain portions of the band's fanbase. In their review of the Los Angeles gig, Revolver wrote "One of the most quietly influential bands in metal reunited last night in Los Angeles ... to play zero of the songs that made them influential."

Mr. Bungle collaborated with several guests during the shows including the comedian Eric Andre, who introduced the band at the beginning of their show at February 7, and Jed Watts, the original drummer of Mr. Bungle.

In the weeks following the February 2020 shows, Mr. Bungle posted without comment on their Twitter account pictures taken in a recording studio, hinting at an upcoming recording. On March 23 and 24, Revolver magazine published a two-part press release and interview with Spruance formally announcing that the band, joined by Scott Ian and Dave Lombardo, were currently re-recording The Raging Wrath of the Easter Bunny in addition to the previously unreleased songs and covers performed during the reunion shows, with an expected release on Patton's label Ipecac Recordings in the fall of 2020. On June 5, Mr. Bungle released a cover of "U.S.A." by The Exploited, featuring a hardcore punk sound. "Doesn't matter what part of the political spectrum you are on, everyone at some point has said, 'Fuck the USA,'" Spruance commented. "The closest thing we have to a universal sentiment."

On August 13, the band officially announced that the album, now titled The Raging Wrath of the Easter Bunny Demo, would be released on October 30. Alongside the announcement, they released an animated music video for the single "Raping Your Mind" directed by Eric Livingston. Dunn described re-recording their earliest material with Lombardo and Ian as "we were finally utilizing our Ph.Ds in Thrash Metal. All we had to do was go back to our original professors for some additional guidance and talk them into joining us. Turns out we were A+ students... We were haunted for 35 years by the fact that this music wasn't given it's [sic] due respect. Now we can die."

In December 2023, Theo Lengyel was named as a person of interest in the disappearance of his girlfriend, Alice "Alyx" Kamakaokalani Herrmann. On January 2, 2024, he was arrested and charged with first-degree murder. On October 11, 2024, he was found guilty of killing Herrmann. On November 8, he was given a sentence of life imprisonment with a minimum term of 25 years.

The band toured South America in early 2026. Avenged Sevenfold frontman M. Shadows joined the band onstage to perform "Retrovertigo" on February 3 at Movistar Arena in Buenos Aires, Argentina.

== Style and influence ==
According to Invisible Oranges, Mr. Bungle "cultivated their own complex universe whose parts, embracing both regimen and disorder, inspired awe with increasing perspective and closer examination". Initially a death metal band, and later a thrash metal group, Mr. Bungle changed their style in the '90s to a funk metal sound that showed the influence of ska, disco and avant-garde jazz. In a 2021 interview, Spruance claimed that, "there's never been a time in Mr. Bungle’s existence where it wasn't a metal band. There was always metal in there somewhere, and when we think ‘metal’; metal isn't just riffs and drums playing like a machine; it's a whole psychology. The psychology of metal is there, even in that funk metal era; it's everywhere."

CBS News said that the band's music was a "anarchic mix of metal, ska, experimental jazz, punk and soundtrack music". The Sydney Morning Herald described Mr. Bungle as "experimental rockers". AllMusic described the band as "free-form rock radicals" and said that "Mr. Bungle's sound and approach are a unique mix of the experimental, the abstract, and the absurd". Pioneers of avant-garde metal, the band was also categorized as alternative metal by Kerrang! and The Quietus.

Prior to the release of their first album in 1991, the Los Angeles Times stated that the band "performs oddball music one critic has described as Bugs Bunny-type jazz." Variety referred to the band as "Zappa-esque Bay Area pranksters" in 2000. Allmusic's Greg Prato described Mr. Bungle's music as a "unique mix of the experimental, the abstract, and the absurd", while Patrick Macdonald of The Seattle Times characterized their music as "harsh, grating, unstructured, blasting, squeaky, speedy, slow, eerie and strangely compelling". Distinctive features of the music were the use of numerous different instruments, unusual vocals, and the use of unpredictable song formats along with a number of different musical genres. Greg Prato stated they "may be the most talented rock instrumentalists today, as they skip musical genres effortlessly, while Mike Patton illustrates why many consider him to be the best singer in rock". Not all have agreed, with one reviewer calling the band the "most ridiculously terrible piece of festering offal ever scraped off the floor of a slaughterhouse". Journalist Geoffrey Himes criticized the band by stating "the vocals are so deeply buried in the music that the words are virtually indecipherable" and described the music as "aural montages rather than songs, for short sections erupt and suddenly disappear, replaced by another passage with little connection to what preceded it".

Mr. Bungle frequently incorporated unconventional instruments into their music, including jaw harp, cimbalom, xylophone, glockenspiel, ocarina, bongos, and woodblocks. Journalist John Serba commented that the band's instrumentation "sounded kind of like drunken jazz punctuated with Italian accordions and the occasional Bavarian march, giant power chord, or feedback noise thrown in". Mike Patton's vocals often employed extended techniques such as death metal growls, crooning, rapping, screeching, gurgling, or whispering. The arrangement of their songs was also idiosyncratic, often lacking a structured song format and rotating through different genres ranging from slow melodies to thrash metal. New York Times journalist Jon Pareles described the band's music as "leap[ing] from tempo to tempo, key to key, style to style, all without warning". Similarly, critic Patrick Macdonald commented, "In the middle of hard-to-follow, indecipherable noise, a relatively normal, funky jazz organ solo will suddenly drift in".

The majority of the band's music and lyrics were written by Patton, Dunn, and Spruance, with McKinnon and Heifetz occasionally contributing. Regarding their creative process, McKinnon stated in a 2000 interview that "This band is kind of like a cruel boys club in a way. You bring some ideas and if you're not 100 percent firm about bringing a certain idea to this group, you can watch it get kicked aside and die really quickly."

It has been noted that the band were given an unusual amount of artistic freedom during their tenure with the major label Warner Bros. Records. In a 2016 interview, Trevor Dunn reflected:

I seem to remember that they always left us alone. Patton was a big asset to them financially and in that regard it gave us some power because they had to appease him. That, for one, meant giving him the freedom to work with us as he always had. I don't believe any of our records ever recouped which isn't that big of a deal for a major label who have much larger fish to fry. For them it is just another tax write-off. And I have a sneaking suspicion that they possibly believed we would 'grow up' musically some day and make them some money.

— Trevor Dunn

Trey Spruance claimed that Warner Bros. cared so little about the band that they once considered delivering an entire album's worth of static noise to the label, expecting them not to listen to it. "Then we realized – actually it doesn't matter to them; that would seem like a big statement but they would just shrug. They don't care about that shit."

== Legacy ==
Korn have utilized what they have dubbed the "Mr. Bungle chord" (A flat fifth chord or "tritone"). James "Munky" Shaffer, one of Korn's guitarists, stated in a 2015 interview that Mr. Bungle's self-titled debut "set the tone for us and what we went on to do creatively".

== Stage shows and image ==
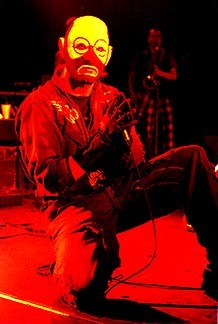
Mike Patton in costume live in 1991

Mr. Bungle were known for their characteristically unconventional stage shows, where the band members would dress up in costumes and masks. The 1999–2000 shows in support of the California album usually featured Dunn dressed as a blonde girl resembling Goldilocks or The St. Pauli Girl, although for the other members this period was largely devoid of masks and outfits due to the increased demands of the music. Occasionally, the band would simply appear in black suits with white dress shirts or dress up in chef costumes, cowboy suits or as the Village People.

== Members ==
All of the members of the 'classic' lineup of Mr. Bungle are multi-instrumentalists. The timeline below reflects only their main roles. Members of the band were known to switch instruments mid-performance.

=== Current members ===
Image	Name	Years active	Instruments	Release contributions
	Mike Patton	1985–2000; 2019–present	lead vocals; keyboards; samples	all releases
	Trey Spruance	1985–2000; 2019–present	lead guitar; keyboards; backing vocals	all releases
	Trevor Dunn	1985–2000; 2019–present	bass; backing vocals	all releases
	Scott Ian	2019–present	rhythm guitar; backing vocals	The Raging Wrath of the Easter Bunny Demo (2020); The Night They Came Home (2021)
	Dave Lombardo	2019–present	drums; glockenspiel	The Raging Wrath of the Easter Bunny Demo (2020); The Night They Came Home (2021)

=== Former members ===
Image	Name	Years active	Instruments	Release contributions
	Theo Lengyel	1985–1996	saxophone; clarinet; keyboards	all releases from The Raging Wrath of the Easter Bunny (1986) to Disco Volante (1995)
	Jed Watts	1985–1987 (guest performer, 2020)	drums; backing vocals	The Raging Wrath of the Easter Bunny (1986)
	Hans Wagner	1987–1989 (guest performer, 2023)	drums	Bowel Of Chiley (1987); Goddammit I Love America!!!$ɫ!! (1988)
	Scott Fritz	1987	trumpet	Bowel Of Chiley (1987)
	Luke Miller	1987–1989	tenor sax; trumpet	Goddammit I Love America!!!$ɫ!! (1988)
	Danny Heifetz	1989–2000 (guest performers, 2024)	drums; percussion; trumpet	all releases from OU818 (1989) to California (1999)
	Clinton "Bär" McKinnon	1989–2000 (guest performers, 2024)	saxophone; clarinet; keyboards; backing vocals	all releases from OU818 (1989) to California (1999)

=== Touring members ===
Image	Name	Years active	Instruments	Release contributions
	William Winant	1995–2000	percussion	Disco Volante (1995); California (1999)
	Ches Smith	1999	percussion	none
	Jeff Attridge	1999	keyboards	none
	James Rotondi	1999–2000	keyboards; guitar; backing vocals	none
	Andreas Kisser	2026 (substitute)	rhythm guitar; backing vocals	none

== Discography ==
=== Studio albums ===
Year	Album details	Peak chart positions				Sales
Year	Album details	US	US Heat	AUS	UK	Sales
1991	Mr. Bungle: Released: August 13, 1991; Label: Warner Bros.; Format: CD, CS, LP	—	—	134	57	US: 232,706
1995	Disco Volante: Released: October 10, 1995; Label: Warner Bros.; Format: CD, CS, LP, DI	113	4	40	—	US: 92,302
1999	California: Released: July 13, 1999; Label: Warner Bros.; Format: CD, CS	144	7	134	—	US: 72,381
2020	The Raging Wrath of the Easter Bunny Demo: Released: October 30, 2020; Label: Ipecac; Format: Digital, CD, 2xLP, Cassette	30	—	6	53	

=== Live albums ===
Year	Album details	Peak chart positions
Year	Album details	AUS
2021	The Night They Came Home: Released: June 11, 2021; Label: Ipecac; Format: CD, LP, digital download, streaming	46

=== Demos ===
Year	Demo	Label
1986	The Raging Wrath of the Easter Bunny	Ladd-Frith
1987	Bowel Of Chiley	Self Released
1988	Goddammit I Love America!!!$ɫ!!	Self Released
1989	OU818	Self Released

=== Singles ===
Year	Single	Album
1991	"Quote Unquote"	Mr. Bungle
1992	"Mi Stoke Il Cigaretto"	Non-album single
1992	"Ballrooms Of Mars" / "Sudden Death"	Split single with The Flaming Lips
1995	"Platypus"	Disco Volante
2020	"USA"	Non-album single
2020	"Raping Your Mind"	The Raging Wrath of the Easter Bunny Demo
2020	"Eracist"	The Raging Wrath of the Easter Bunny Demo
2020	"Sudden Death"	The Raging Wrath of the Easter Bunny Demo

=== Music videos ===
Year	Video	Director
1991	"Quote Unquote"	Kevin Kerslake
1991	"My Ass Is on Fire"	Steve Lederman
2020	"Raping Your Mind"	Eric Livingston
2020	"Eracist"	Derrick Scocchera
2020	"Sudden Death"	Derek Cianfrance

=== Live video ===
Year	Video	Director
2020	Mr. Bungle: The Night They Came Home	Jack Bennett

== See also ==
- List of alternative metal artists
- List of avant-garde metal artists
- List of bands from the San Francisco Bay Area
- List of experimental musicians
- List of funk metal and funk rock bands
