= Gregg Turkington =

American comedian

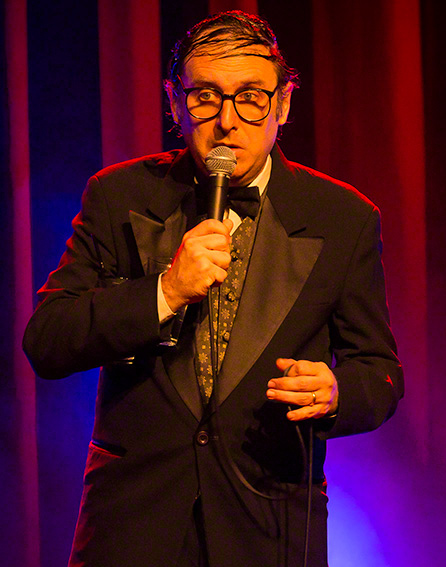
- Turkington performing as Neil Hamburger in 2016
- Born: November 25, 1967 (age 58); Darwin, Northern Territory, Australia
- Occupations: Comedian; musician; actor
- Years active: 1983–present
- Spouse: Simone Turkington
- Musical career
- Also known as: The Goulding Institute; Totem Pole of Losers
- Origin: San Francisco, California, U.S.
- Genres: Punk; avant-garde
- Instrument: Vocals
- Labels: Amarillo; Planet Pimp; Drag City
- Website: americasfunnyman.com

Gregg Turkington (born November 25, 1967) is an American comedian, entertainer, actor, musician and writer. He is known for his performances as Neil Hamburger, a stand-up comedian persona he developed in the 1990s. Alongside Tim Heidecker, Turkington also stars as a fictionalized version of himself on the comedic web series On Cinema (2011–). In addition, he formed one-half of the band Zip Code Rapists and has collaborated on numerous projects with musicians including Trey Spruance (Mr. Bungle, Secret Chiefs 3).

In the 1990s, Turkington ran an independent label, Amarillo Records, which distributed his original albums and albums of other artists from the San Francisco punk scene. In 2015, he starred as a variant of the Neil Hamburger character for the feature-length drama film Entertainment, directed by Rick Alverson, and subsequently gave his first interviews as himself instead of an assumed persona. Turkington also was a regular voice actor on the Disney XD series Gravity Falls, and had minor roles in the Marvel Cinematic Universe films Ant-Man (2015) and Ant-Man and the Wasp: Quantumania (2023).

== Career ==
=== Early career ===
Turkington rose to prominence in the mid-1980s as the publisher of underground zine Breakfast Without Meat which brought punk respectability to "square" musical artists such as Tiny Tim, Jimmy Webb, the 101 Strings, and Richard Harris through feature articles. A frequent contributor to the zine was Derrick Bostrom of the Meat Puppets.

In the 1980s, Turkington also performed in obscure San Francisco bands such as Caroliner, Hello Kitty on Ice and Bean Church, and worked at Subterranean Records, contributing artwork and live recordings to Flipper's Public Flipper Limited Live 1980-1985 album.

In the early 1990s, Turkington operated the Amarillo Records label, which released works by many artists from San Francisco's post-punk avant-garde music scene. He was a member of The Easy Goings, Totem Pole of Losers and the Zip Code Rapists (with John Singer). He collaborated with Trey Spruance of Mr. Bungle in The Three Doctors, Faxed Head (with James Goode, Trey Spruance, and Phil Franklin), Secret Chiefs 3, Colonel Truth (with Brandan Kearney and Rebecca G. Wilson) and The Bon Larvis Band. Many of these bands appeared on 1996's Amarillo Records compilation CD, You Gan’t Boar Like An Eabla When You Work With Turkrys, along with the likes of Sun City Girls, Thinking Fellers Union Local 282, U.S. Saucer, Harvey Sid Fisher, Dieselhed, and Church of Satan founder Anton Szandor LaVey. He was also a tour manager for both Link Wray and Mr. Bungle. He contributed lead vocals to two tracks by the Secret Chiefs 3.

In the late 1990s, Turkington had abandoned Amarillo Records and all of his musical projects and moved to Melbourne, Australia, where he lived until 2003. Since then, he has written the book Warm Voices Rearranged: Anagram Record Reviews with fellow Three Doctors alumnus Brandan Kearney, also of World of Pooh, Caroliner, and Archipelago Brewing Co. He was a contributing editor to the British version of Maxim in 2005 and 2006, as well as to Johan Kugelberg's 2013 book Enjoy The Experience: Homemade Records 1958–1992.

In 2005 and 2006, after ten years of inactivity, his musical duo Zip Code Rapists did a handful of reunion shows, performing in San Francisco, Saint Paul, Minnesota, Toronto, and Montreal.

He has provided various voices for the animated series The Marvelous Misadventures of Flapjack, Aqua Teen Hunger Force, Adventure Time, Sanjay and Craig, and Gravity Falls. A parody screenplay entitled "Bicycle Built for Two" which was co-written with Tim Heidecker was published in McSweeney's #36 in December 2010.

Turkington appears in the full-length independent drama The Comedy, directed by Rick Alverson and starring Tim Heidecker. The film premiered at the Sundance Film Festival in January 2012.

=== On Cinema era ===
Tim Heidecker and Gregg Turkington star in Adult Swim's web series On Cinema at the Cinema, portraying a pair of hapless movie reviewers. Turkington's persona in the series is that of a self-described movie expert, although he rarely provides any useful criticism, lauds forgettable films, and often fails to correctly answer simple trivia questions. The series has run for fifteen seasons thus far, with guest appearances by Jimmy McNichol, Joe Estevez, Sally Kellerman, Candy Clark, Peyton Reed, and John Aprea. In 2013 the On Cinema Film Guide app was released, featuring the voices of Turkington and Heidecker reviewing over 17,000 films. Turkington also co-stars as Special Agent Kington in the On Cinema at the Cinema spin-off series Decker.

Turkington had a role in Marvel Studios' 2015 movie Ant-Man, which subsequently becomes a major running plot point in the On Cinema universe. He appeared in the series finale of CSI: Crime Scene Investigation as bombing suspect Lawrence Territo.

In 2022, Turkington appeared as his On Cinema persona in the episode about The Wizard of Oz of the Shudder movie documentary series Cursed Films.

== Neil Hamburger ==
Turkington is best known for creating anti-comedian Neil Hamburger. In 1992, Turkington released an album of prank phone calls with several tracks featuring an early version of the character and soon after began developing a stand-up comedian persona. The character constantly clears his throat while telling off-paced jokes that, for the most part, fail. Neil's unique brand of comedy has thrilled, perplexed and repulsed audiences worldwide. Since 1998, he has released a number of records on the Drag City record label.

In the 2000s, he appeared on Jimmy Kimmel Live!, Tom Green Live, Tim and Eric Awesome Show, Great Job!, and Fox News' Red Eye. He also appeared in the short film Left For Dead in Malaysia, and had a brief cameo appearance in the 2006 film Tenacious D in The Pick of Destiny. The Neil Hamburger character plays the role of Osric in the 2014 film, Hamlet A.D.D., a live action and animated version of William Shakespeare's Hamlet. He was rumored to appear in his Neil Hamburger persona in Greg Mottola's 2011 ensemble comedy film Paul, but he did not.

Turkington co-wrote and starred in the 2015 feature film Entertainment, directed by Rick Alverson, with a supporting cast including John C. Reilly, Tye Sheridan, Lotte Verbeek, Amy Seimetz, Michael Cera, David Yow, and Annabella Lwin. The film premiered at the Sundance Film Festival in January 2015. While unnamed, the character in the film is a clear adaptation of the Hamburger character.

== Personal life ==
Turkington was born in Darwin, Northern Territory, Australia, to American parents, and grew up in Tempe, Arizona, and San Francisco, California. He lives in Los Angeles with his wife, Simone Turkington. He is a vegan.

== Discography ==
=== Solo ===
as Neil Hamburger

- 1992 – Great Phone Calls Featuring Neil Hamburger – (Amarillo)
- 1996 – America's Funnyman (Drag City)
- 1998 – Raw Hamburger (Drag City)
- 1998 – Neil Hamburger Pays Tribute to Diana, Princess of Wales (EP) (Planet Pimp)
- 1999 – Left for Dead in Malaysia (Drag City)
- 2000 – Inside Neil Hamburger (EP) (Drag City)
- 2000 – 50 States, 50 Laughs (Million Dollar Performances)
- 2002 – Laugh Out Lord (Drag City)
- 2003 – Live at Phoenix Greyhound Park DVD (Kung Fu)
- 2005 – Great Moments at Di Presa's Pizza House (Drag City)
- 2005 – The World's Funnyman DVD (Drag City)
- 2007 – Hot February Night (Off-Price Value Center)
- 2008 – Neil Hamburger Sings Country Winners (Drag City)
- 2012 – Live at Third Man Records (Third Man Records)
- 2012 – Margaret Cho and Neil Hamburger (7") (Million Dollar Performances)
- 2013 – Incident at Cambridge, Mass. (Burger Records)
- 2014 – First of Dismay (Drag City)
- 2019 – Still Dwelling (Drag City)
- 2023 – Seasonal Depression Suite (Drag City)

as Totem Pole of Losers

- 1993 – Jesus, I Am Loving You (Amarillo)

as The Golding Institute

- 1994 – Sounds of the American Fast Food Restaurants (Planet Pimp)
- 1997 – Sounds of the San Francisco Adult Book Stores (Planet Pimp)
- 1998 – Sounds of the International Airport Restrooms (Planet Pimp)
- 2006 – Final Relaxation (Ipecac)
- 2025 – Sounds of The Golding Institute (Rope Worm)

=== Collaborations ===
with the Zip Code Rapists

- 1992 – Sing And Play The Three Doctors (Amarillo)
- 1994 – The Man Can't Bust Our Music! (EP) (Ectoplasm)
- 1994 – Sing And Play The Matador Records Catalog (EP) (Ecstatic Piss)
- 1995 – 94124 (EP) (Amarillo)
- 1995 – Live "In Competence" (Beast 666 Tapes)
- 2005 – Here at Last... Live!!! (Freedom From)
- 2009 – Sing And Play The Three Doctors (with 24 bonus tracks) (Eabla)

with The Easy Goings

- 1989 – The Easy Goings (Bee-Fast)
- 1993 – Cigarettes (Nuf Sed)

with the Three Doctors

- 1994 – Back To Basics-"Live" (Amarillo)
- 1995 – Archaeology of the Infinite (Amarillo)

with Faxed Head

- 1995 – Uncomfortable But Free (Amarillo)
- 1997 – Exhumed at Birth (Amarillo)
- 2001 – Chiropractic (Web of Mimicry)
- 2008 – From Coalinga to Osaka: Live in Japan 1995 (Web of Mimicry)

with Secret Chiefs 3

- 2007 – Path of Most Resistance (Web of Mimicry)

with Hard-Ons

- 2011 – American Exports (Alternative Tentacles)

== Filmography ==
=== Television ===
Year	Title	Role	Notes
2003-2005	Jimmy Kimmel Live!	Neil Hamburger	Performer, 3 episodes
2006-2014	Tom Green's House Tonight	Neil Hamburger	Performer, 6 episodes
2007	The Comedy Can Television Series	Neil Hamburger	TV special
2007–2008	Tim and Eric Awesome Show, Great Job!	Egg-Zackly Guy / Neil Hamburger	2 episodes
2007–2008	Red Eye	Neil Hamburger	Performer, 7 episodes
2009	Free Radio	Neil Hamburger	Episode: "Lance's Posse"
2009	SpongeBob SquarePants	Camera Operator	Episode: "Truth or Square"
2009–2010	The Marvelous Misadventures of Flapjack	Various voice roles	12 episodes
2010	The New Big Ball With Neil Hamburger	Neil Hamburger	Unaired pilot; writer and producer
2011	Aqua Teen Hunger Force	Wi-tri (voice)	Episode: "Wi-tri"; credited as Neil Hamburger
2012–2016	Gravity Falls	Toby Determined (voice)	16 episodes and Mabel's Guide to Life short
2012	Pick-a-Split	Neil Hamburger (voice)	Game show; host
2012	Adventure Time	Chipler / Shrub (voice)	2 episodes
2014	Comedy Bang! Bang!	Drinking Man	Episode: "Rob Corddry Wears Tan Dress Shoes & Red Socks"
2014–2020	Decker	Jonathan Kington / Various	48 episodes & 2 specials; also writer; uncredited director for 4 episodes & 2 specials
2015	Sanjay and Craig	D.I.N.K. (voice)	Episode: "Dangerous Debbie/D.I.N.K."
2015	CSI: Crime Scene Investigation	Lawrence Territo	Episode: "Immortality"
2017	Clarence	Greg / Square Dad / Punk (voice)	Episode: "Rock Show"
2017	Future-Worm!	Jarmy (voice)	Episode: "Egg in the Family/The Right to Bear Arms/This Week in Future Science 2"
2019	Tigtone	Blood King / Fire King / Shadow King (voice)	Episode: "...And Those Elemental Kings"
2022	Cursed Films	Gregg Turkington	Episode: "The Wizard of Oz"
2023	What We Do in the Shadows	Gregg	Episode: "The Campaign"
2023	Harley Quinn	Clegg Bucks (voice)	Episode: "A Potato-Based Cloning Incident"
2026	The Terrors of Jordan Mendoza	Principal Jeffers	Episode: "Found a Leprechaun"

=== Film ===
Year	Title	Role	Notes
1994	Terminal USA	Six	Film debut
2001	Circuit 8: Volume 8	Neil Hamburger	Video magazine
2003	The Show Must Go Off!: Neil Hamburger Live at the Phoenix Greyhound Park	Neil Hamburger	Filmed performance of stand-up act
2006	The Amazing Adventures of Pleaseeasaur	Neil Hamburger	Direct-to-video
2006	Tenacious D in The Pick of Destiny	Neil Hamburger	
2006	The World's Funnyman	Neil Hamburger	Filmed performance of stand-up act
2009	Coco Lipshitz: Behind the Laughter	Neil Hamburger	Short film
2009	Western Music and Variety	Neil Hamburger	Filmed performance of stand-up act
2010	The Great Intervention	Josh (voice)	
2012	The Comedy	Bobby	
2014	Hamlet A.D.D.	Osric	
2014	The Begun of Tigtone	The Cave Demon (voice)	Short film
2015	Entertainment	The Comedian	Feature film; lead role, co-writer
2015	Ant-Man	Dale	
2018	A Futile and Stupid Gesture	Advertiser	
2019	Mister America	Gregg Turkington	Also co-producer, co-writer
2020	Mr. Bungle: The Night They Came Home	Neil Hamburger	Filmed concert
2023	Fremont	Dr. Anthony	
2023	Ant-Man and the Wasp: Quantumania	Dale	
2024	Christmas Eve in Miller's Point	Sergeant Brooks	Completed
2024	Illuminatus!	Georges Dorn/President (voice)	Short film

=== Applications ===
Year	Title	Role	Notes
2010	Shaky Advice from Neil Hamburger	Neil Hamburger	writer
2015	On Cinema Film Guide	Gregg Turkington	writer

=== Web series ===
Year	Title	Role	Notes
2006–2007	Poolside Chats with Neil Hamburger	Neil Hamburger	Live webcast; co-creator
2007	Tim and Eric Nite Live!	Neil Hamburger	Episode: "Will Forte as Emanuel Melly and Neil Hamburger"
2012–present	On Cinema	Gregg Turkington	All episodes. Also writer, producer.
2013	Think Talk	Neil Hamburger	Episode: "Neil Hamburger"
2017–2019	Too Loud!	Miz Abbott	Animated web series, 11 episodes

=== Music videos ===
Year	Title	Role	Artist
2003	Punisher	Neil Hamburger	Frenzal Rhomb
2003	Ball Chef	Neil Hamburger	Frenzal Rhomb
2007	Conspiracy of the Gods	Neil Hamburger	Trans Am
2015	I'm Alright	Neil Hamburger	Ugly Kid Joe

== Bibliography ==
- 2002: Warm Voices Rearranged: Anagram Record Reviews (with Brendan Kearney)
- 2010: Bicycle Built for Two (with Tim Heidecker)
- 2019: Brendan Kearney's Official On Cinema at the Cinema Reader Volume 1: 2010–2018 (with Tim Heidecker and Brendan Kearney)
