= Entertainment (2015 film) =

2015 film directed by Rick Alverson

- Film poster
- Directed by: Rick Alverson
- Written by: Rick Alverson; Gregg Turkington; Tim Heidecker
- Produced by: Ryan Zacarias; Ryan Lough; George Rush; Brooke Bernard; Rick Alverson; Patrick Hibler; Alex Lipschultz
- Starring: Gregg Turkington; John C. Reilly; Tye Sheridan; Amy Seimetz; Lotte Verbeek; Michael Cera
- Cinematography: Lorenzo Hagerman
- Edited by: Michael Taylor; Rick Alverson
- Music by: Robert Donne
- Production companies: Jagjaguwar; Nomadic Independence; Made Bed
- Distributed by: Magnolia Pictures
- Release date: January 25, 2015 (Sundance)
- Running time: 102 minutes
- Country: United States
- Language: English

Entertainment is a 2015 American drama film directed by Rick Alverson, starring Gregg Turkington, Tye Sheridan, and John C. Reilly. It is loosely based on Turkington's Neil Hamburger character. The plot follows a stand-up comedian as he performs in various locations where the audience is either hostile or indifferent to him. Alverson, Turkington and Tim Heidecker co-wrote the film.

The film premiered at the Sundance Film Festival in 2015. It was released in a limited theatrical release by Magnolia Pictures in North America, and through video on demand in November 2015, receiving a generally positive reception from film critics. This is the final film to star Dean Stockwell prior to his retirement and death.

== Plot ==
After touring an aircraft boneyard in the California desert, The Comedian performs a stand-up routine in character to an audience of prisoners following a clown act by "Eddie the Opener". The convicts react positively to his sexist, racist, and homophobic jokes. Back at his hotel, he leaves a voicemail for his daughter while a soap opera plays on television. The next night his performance at a bar is poorly received and he harangues the audience.

After the show The Comedian's cousin John converses about the unenthusiastic audience while passively criticizing the distastefulness of his routine. The Comedian blames the heckler. At another hotel, the comedian leaves another voicemail for his daughter. The next day, he tours an oil field and performs at a bar where Eddie the Opener is well received but not so The Comedian. No hotel rooms being available, he stays at the manager's cousin's house. A woman watches the sleeping Comedian as an image of him dressed in white appears on-screen.

He tours a ghost town and leaves a voicemail for his daughter lamenting how hard it is to reach her. Cousin John shows him an orange orchard and they overfly his land in a light aircraft before, dining al fresco, John fails in his drunken attempts to get The Comedian to entertain his family. The next day The Comedian goes to a bowling alley then a shooting park before crashing a chromotherapy seminar and falling asleep in the midst of it. He encounters The Chromotherapist again at his hotel. She puts him in a red-light therapy booth as she sets up chairs for another seminar. In his hotel room he watches the same soap opera again. Eddie performs to an enthusiastic crowd. A filmmaker wants The Comedian to star in a video, but he abandons the desert set while the camera is being set up.

Preparing for a show Eddie thanks The Comedian for bringing him along. The show goes badly and the comedian aims vulgar insults at a woman, who throws a drink at him before leaving the bar, then assaults him as he is walking to his car. Eddie takes him to his hotel room, but the comedian eventually insults him too.

The Comedian stops on the road to examine a wrecked car. He hits a dog on the road and, in a public bathroom, a stranger named Tommy says his car has broken down and asks The Comedian to keep him company while he waits for help. The Comedian rebuffs him. He gets drunk in his hotel room and leaves another voicemail, quietly singing Ave Maria.

The Comedian performs at a party and stays the night. Investigating cries from a restroom, he finds a woman in labor. We next see the bloodied Comedian on the floor propped against the restroom wall holding the lifeless newborn. He wakes up the next morning in his car to find children smearing chocolate on the windows.

At his next performance, The Comedian just picks up a trophy and aims it at the audience, pretending to shoot at them with it. His vocalized shooting noises devolve into continuous blowing raspberries until he walks off stage. The manager says, "We're not paying for that". He leaves a fifth voicemail for his daughter from a public restroom.

At The Celebrity's pool party, The Comedian emerges to applause from a cake, then breaks down sobbing on hands and knees before throwing himself into the pool. As he wades to the edge, images appear of him dripping wet on stage, wearing the same white outfit seen before, and exiting a jail cell. He enters the set of the soap opera. Sitting on a hotel room bed, he laughs hysterically as he watches himself in the soap opera on the television.

== Cast ==
- Gregg Turkington as The Comedian
- Tye Sheridan as Eddie the Opener
- John C. Reilly as Cousin John
- Lotte Verbeek as The Chromotherapist
- Michael Cera as Tommy
- Amy Seimetz as Woman in Bar
- David Yow as Party Host
- Tim Heidecker as The Celebrity
- Dean Stockwell as The Celebrity's Henchman
- Natalia Contreras as Ruben's Girlfriend
- Annabella Lwin as Airplane Tour Guide
- Dustin Guy Defa as Ruben

== Production ==
Gregg Turkington had previously appeared in director Rick Alverson's The Comedy. Alverson proposed to Turkington the idea of making a film based on his character Neil Hamburger. The two discussed what Hamburger's character would be like off stage, both finding that his life would be dull and not very dynamic. Turkington had been previously offered to make a film or television programs revolving around the character approaching people in the street which he felt was wrong for the character and was far more interested in a film that he described as a "Two-Lane Blacktop” art film kind of vibe."

The film's script was written by Alverson, Turkington and Tim Heidecker. The film's dialogue is improvised. Turkington described the dialogue as "really more based on descriptions of the tone or the mood that was needed in particular scenes, and kind of running with that.

Turkington and Alverson initially disagreed on some aspects of the Neil Hamburger character, such as never showing the character without his glasses and never showing the character talking in a normal voice. Alverson felt the film wouldn't be credible if Turkington constantly spoke in his Neil Hamburger voice. Among the locations Hamburger visits in the film is an aircraft boneyard. No actual tours take place at the location which was part of a military facility in Mojave, California, which allowed them a few hours to film where they could only shoot the film in certain directions.

== Release and reception ==
Entertainment premiered at the Next Section at the Sundance Film Festival on January 25, 2015. It received generally favorable reviews. The film has an 80% approval rating on the review aggregator website Rotten Tomatoes, based on forty reviews, with the consensus: "As brilliantly and uncomfortably confrontational as its protagonist, Entertainment is a boundary-blurring exercise in cinematic misanthropy that more than lives up to its title." Metacritic, which assigns a weighted average score, gave the film a 65 out of 100 based on thirteen reviews from critics. In The New Yorker, critic Richard Brody calls Turkington's character an "intentionally, repulsively unfunny comedian" and Alverson's film a "wildly imaginative, grimly sardonic anti-comedy."
