= Robert Dunn =

Robert or Bob Dunn may refer to:

== Sportspeople ==
- Robert Dunn (footballer) (born 1979), Scottish footballer
- Robert Dunn (handballer) (born 1973), American handball player
- Robbie Dunn (born 1960), Australian former soccer player
- Bob Dunn (American football) (1904–1978), American football player

== Politicians ==
- Robert C. Dunn (1855–1918), American politician
- Robert G. Dunn (1923–2017), American politician
- Robert N. Dunn (1857–1925), Justice of the Idaho Supreme Court
- Robert W. Dunn (1895–1977), American political activist and economic researcher
- Bob Dunn (politician) (1946–2003), British Conservative Party MP for Dartford, 1979–1997

== Others ==
- Robert Dunn (biologist), American biologist and writer
- Robert Dunn (novelist) (born 1950), American novelist
- Robert Dunn (surgeon) (1799–1877), British physician
- Bob Dunn (cartoonist) (1908–1989), American cartoonist
- Bob Dunn (musician) (1908–1971), pioneer Western swing musician
- Bobby Dunn (1890–1937), comic actor
- Robbie Dunn (musician) (born 1951), Irish folk singer-songwriter
- Robert 'Dolly' Dunn (1941–2009), Australian former school-teacher, convicted of child molestation in 2001
- Robert F. Dunn (born 1928), American admiral
- Robert Ellis Dunn (1928–1996), American postmodern dance pioneer

== See also ==
- Robert Dunne (disambiguation)
- Robert Done (1904–1982), English footballer
- Robert Donne (born 1967), guitarist
