= Planet Pimp =

Planet Pimp may refer to:

- Planet Pimp Records, a San Francisco based record label
- Planet Pimp (album), a 2008 album by Soil & "Pimp" Sessions
