= Zip Code Rapists =

Experimental rock band

- Origin: San Francisco, California
- Genres: Punk revival, avant-garde
- Years active: 1991–1996, 2005–2006
- Labels: Amarillo Records
- Spinoffs: Zip Code Revue, Three Doctors Band
- Members: Gregg Turkington; John Singer

Zip Code Rapists were an avant-garde band active in the 1990s. The band was composed of guitarist John Singer and singer Gregg Turkington. The band is known for their confrontational, deconstructionist, absurd live performances, as well as their bizarre, more fleshed-out recordings. During the group's fake break-up in 1994, Singer and Turkington formed competing spin-off bands, the Zip Code Revue and The Three Doctors Band, presumably attempts to siphon off Zip Code Rapists fans for themselves.

In 1996, after a Japanese tour with Faxed Head, the Zip Code Rapists ceased performing or recording. Gregg Turkington has since gone on to perform as the anti-comedy personality Neil Hamburger. John Singer continues to make music in Vermont. The Zip Code Rapists reunited for a handful of shows in California and in Canada in 2005–2006, followed by a retrospective CD release on the Eabla label in 2009. In 2015 they did a one-off show in Brooklyn, New York.

== Discography ==
The band released the following albums:

=== Studio albums ===
- Sing and Play the Three Doctors and Other Sounds of Today (1992, Amarillo / 2009, Eabla)

=== EPs ===
- The Man Can't Bust Our Music! (1993, Ectoplasm)
- Sing and Play the Madator Records Catalog (1994, Ecstatic Piss)
- 94124 (1995, Amarillo)

=== Live albums ===
- Live "In Competence" Beast 666
- Here at Last... Live!!! Freedom from 2005
