= The Mummies =

American garage punk band

Background information
- Origin: San Mateo, California, United States
- Genres: Garage punk; surf punk
- Years active: 1988–1992, 1993, 1994, 2008-2011, 2015-present
- Labels: Estrus; Telstar; Planet Pimp; Sympathy for the Record Industry
- Past members: Trent Ruane; Maz Kattuah; Larry Winther; Russell Quan

The Mummies are an American garage punk band formed in San Bruno, California, in 1988. Exhibiting a defiantly raw and lo-fi sound, they dubbed "budget rock", the Mummies' rebellious attitude and distinctive performance costumes exerted a major influence on later emerging garage punk and garage rock revival acts.

Their recorded output was intentionally completed with poor, cheap equipment, including their first and only studio album Never Been Caught, which was released after the group's initial break-up. Since then, the Mummies have engaged in several positively-received reunion concerts and tours, including appearances in Europe and the US sporadically through to recent years.

In 2020, the band announced that they had been working on a movie directed by independent filmmaker, Jim Garanto and written by the band.

== History ==
Formed in late 1988 by Trent Ruane (lead singer, organ, saxophone) and Maz Kattuah (bass guitar), the band's lineup also included Larry Winther (lead guitar), and Russell Quan (drums). The group became a key musical force in San Francisco's emerging garage punk scene alongside the Phantom Surfers and the Untamed Youth, although the band set out to be cruder than their contemporaries. The group adopted the moniker the Mummies and immediately became known for their style of dress, clothing themselves in tattered rags like monster mummies. This homemade choice of attire was influential on the local garage punk scene, with newer groups also dressing in similarly gimmicky clothing.

Influenced by R&B and 1960s garage rock bands such as the Sonics and the Fabulous Wailers, the Mummies, according to promoter and musician Jorge "Real Boss Hoss" Ojeda, "created the 'budget rock' sound. They recorded their own records on cheap, damaged gear and self-released them". Indeed, starting with their debut performance at the Chi Chi Club in February 1989, the band was committed to a "do it yourself" approach, epitomized by their cheap, vintage gear and Farfisa organ, a characteristic instrument of 1960s garage. In 1990, the group released their debut single, "That Girl", on the Mummies' own short-lived Pre-B.S. Records. "We recorded nearly everything we did on a rack-mount cassette 4-track", explained Ruane. "Despite those four tracks we recorded things live, and mostly premixed on two tracks. By premixed, I mean I would manually ride the mixer during the recording, and adjust levels on-the-fly, like boosting the guitar track during the solo".

Keeping with their total disdain for modern technology, the Mummies refused to publish their music on compact disc, and often brandished their vinyl covers with the slogan, "Fuck CDs". Several singles followed in the early 1990s on different record labels, most notably Estrus Records, which also distributed a compilation album of the Mummies' singles, The Mummies Play Their Own Records!, in 1992. In 1991, the Mummies recorded an album's worth of material for Crypt Records; however, the band felt the results of the recording sessions did not appropriately capture their lo-fi sound, and discarded the material. Nonetheless, the songs were bootlegged on the album Fuck the Mummies, and the band re-recorded the material. After extensive West Coast gigging, a tour of the Northwest with Thee Headcoats, and some engagements on the East Coast, the Mummies disbanded in January 1992, shortly before their first and only studio album, Never Been Caught, was released.

The band briefly reunited the following year to tour Europe bringing Supercharger (a garage rock band the Mummies were friends with) as support, after convincing the promoters the trio added to their four members would be the equivalent of bringing over one ska band. In 1994, persuaded by the positive response, the band returned on another tour and released the live album Party at Steve's House before disbanding again. Following the Mummies' break-up, the band members were active with other projects: Ruane, Kattuah, and Quan have all played with the Phantom Surfers, while Ruane has also worked with the Untamed Youth. Kattuah, who develops science museum exhibits in addition to performing, performed in the Maybellines while Quan was involved with many groups including the Maybellines, the Bobbyteens, the Count Backwurds, and the Dukes of Hamburg. Additionally, Winther wrote, toured and recorded with the Orange Peels.

In 2003, the band released Death By Unga Bunga, a compilation album which was the first Mummies release to be distributed on compact disc. The Mummies have since arranged one-off concert reunions on an intermittent basis, starting in 2008.

=== Trivia ===
Since the band's 1990s heyday, the popularity of the Mummies has grown steadily with the successive generation of garage and indie rock musical acts, and the group also holds a devoted cult following. Music critic Mark Deming proclaimed the Mummies the "kings of budget rock", adding that "it's difficult to imagine the rawest edge of the garage revival bands existing without the guiding influence of the gauze-wrapped foursome".

Writer Annie Llewellyn noted that the Mummies "became notorious for wild live shows that frequently had them abusing the shit out of the audience". Ruane reflected on the group's time in San Francisco's garage punk scene: "For some unbeknownst reason, we went over in a big way up there", and "Soon there was a very short-lived, extremely frenetic climate in San Francisco, as we had inadvertently caused a scene (in the literal sense)".

== Members ==
- Maz Kattuah – bass guitar
- Larry Winther – lead guitar
- Trent Ruane – organ, saxophone
- Russell Quan – drums

== Discography ==
=== Albums ===
- Northwest Budget Rock Massacre! (1991)
- The Mummies Vs. The Wolfmen (1991)
- Never Been Caught (1992)
- Live At Café The Pit's (1993)
- The Mummies Vs. Supercharger Tour '93 (1993)
- Party at Steve's House (1994)

=== Extended plays ===
- Shitsville (1990)
- Split with The Wolfmen (1991)
- Greg Lowery & The Mummies (1992)
- (You Must Fight to Live) On the Planet of the Apes (1993)
- Split with Supercharger (1993)

=== Singles ===
- "That Girl" (1990)
- "Food, Sickles, and Girls" (1990)
- "Out of Our Tree" (1990)
- "Test Drive" (1990)
- "Skinny Minnie" (1990)
- Split with The Phantom Surfers (1991)
- "Greg Lowery & The Mummies" (1992)
- "Introduction to the Mummies" (1992)
- "Stronger Than Dirt" (1992)
- "Gwendolyn" (1994)
- "Get Late" (1995)
- "Only Sold at the Show" (2010)

=== Compilation albums ===
- The Mummies: Play Their Own Records! (1992)
- Double Dumb Ass... In The Face (1996)
- Runnin' On Empty Vol. 1 (1996)
- Runnin' On Empty Vol. 2 (1997)
- Death By Unga Bunga!! (2003)

=== Bootlegs ===
- Fuck the Mummies (1992)
- Peel Sessions (1994)
- Tales From The Crypt (1994)
- The Penultimate Show Ever (2010)
- Uncontrollable Urge (Sub-Pop Singles Club)
- B-Sides and Rarities
- Victim of Circumstances

=== Other appearances ===
- Tales From Estrus No. 1 (1990)
- The Estrus Half-Rack (1991)
- Clam Chowder & Ice vs. Big Macs & Bombers (1991) (Nardwuar the Human Serviette)
- Follow That Munster: Raw Sixties Punk Vol. 2 (1991)
- Groin Thunder (1992)
- Fuck You Spaceman! (1992)
- Turban Renewal: A Tribute to Sam the Sham and the Pharaohs (1994)
- Blood Orgy of the Leather Girls (1994)
- Children of Nuggets: Original Artyfacts from the Second Psychedelic Era, 1976–1995 (2005)
