= Jezebel (Frankie Laine song) =

Single by Frankie Laine
- B-side: "Rose, Rose, I Love You" (Lin Mei, Wilfred Thomas [sic] for Wilfrid Thomas)
- Released: April 1951
- Recorded: April 4, 1951
- Genre: Pop
- Length: 3:08
- Label: Columbia (nr. 39367)
- Songwriter: Wayne Shanklin

Frankie Laine singles chronology
"When You're in Love" (1951)	"Jezebel" (1951)	"Hey Good Lookin'" (1951)

"Jezebel" is a 1951 popular song written by American songwriter Wayne Shanklin. It was recorded by Frankie Laine with the Norman Luboff Choir and Mitch Miller and his orchestra on April 4, 1951 and released by Columbia Records as catalog number 39367. The record reached number 2 on the Billboard chart and was a million seller. The B-side, "Rose, Rose, I Love You", was a hit too and reached number 3.

== Background ==
The title refers to the biblical woman Jezebel, a wicked, Baal-worshipping Phoenician princess who ruled Israel as queen consort to King Ahab. Jezebel's story is recounted in 1 Kings 16-20 and 2 Kings 9, books of the Old Testament.

== Covers ==
- In November of the same year, Edith Piaf recorded the French-language version, with lyrics by Charles Aznavour.
- In 1951 Winifred Atwell charted in the UK with an instrumental version.
- In 1951 Desi Arnaz sang a version in the sitcom I Love Lucy (Season 1, Episode 10).
- In 1956 Gene Vincent and his Blue Caps performed their version of the song on their debut album.
- In 1961 The Everly Brothers performed the song on their seventh album "Instant Party!".
- In 1962, Marty Wilde had a UK Top 20 hit with his version of the song.
- In 1963, Rob E. G. (Australian steel slide guitarist), took his instrumental version into the Australian top 5.
- In the same year, Charles Aznavour also recorded the version with his lyrics previously sung by Piaf.
- In 1965, Johnny Kendall & the Heralds released a version which reached No. 29 on the Dutch chart.
- In 1967, Herman's Hermits included their version on the LP There's a Kind of Hush All Over the World.
- In 1990 Luxuria included their version on the CD titled Beast Box (was not included on the LP).
- In 1992, The Mummies included their version on the LP Never Been Caught.
- In 1994, The Reverend Horton Heat included his version on the LP Liquor in the Front.
- In 1995, Dave Vanian of The Damned included his version on the LP Dave Vanian and the Phantom Chords.
- In 2011, English singer-songwriter Anna Calvi recorded a cover which blends both Laine's English and Piaf's French iterations, released as a single.
