= The Builder =

The Builder could refer to:

== Media ==
- Building (magazine), a British magazine formerly branded The Builder
- The Builder (film), a 2010 feature film
- The Builder (short story), a 1953 science fiction story by Philip K. Dick

== People and fictional characters ==
- Bob the Builder

- Bob the Builder (character)

- David the Builder (1073–1125), King of Georgia
- Nerses III the Builder (fl. 641–661), Catholicos of the Armenian Apostolic Church
- Tito the Builder, Colombian-American activist
