= Atom Ellis =

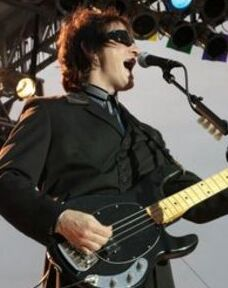
- Atom Ellis with The New Cars (2006)

Background information
- Born: April 8, 1966 (age 60)
- Occupation: Musician
- Instrument: Bass guitar

Atom Ellis (born April 8, 1966) is an American bass guitarist from San Francisco, California.

== Career ==
Atom was a founding member of the Thrash Funk band Psychefunkapus from 1986 to 1992 and a member of the San Francisco band Dieselhed from 1993 to 2000. During and after his tenure with Dieselhed he also performed as a regular sideman for Link Wray from 1996 to 2003.

For shorter stints Atom performed and recorded with World Entertainment War, The Pop-o-pies, Linda Perry, Virgil Shaw, Richard Thompson, Carl Hancock Rux, Neil Hamburger, Chuck Prophet, and Todd Rundgren & The New Cars.

Ellis has performed as a sub for Rick Anderson in The Tubes since 2010 and has - since Rick's passing in 2022 - been "keeping the seat warm" ever since. Ellis cites Rick as a major bass influence since childhood.

Atom also now tours and records with The Flamin' Groovies.

== Selected discography ==
- Psychefunkapus-"Psychefunkapus" (1990- Atlantic #82063, credits: Bass/Vocals)
- Psychefunkapus-"Skin" (1991- Atlantic #82331, credits: Bass/Vocals)
- World Entertainment War (1991-Popular Metaphysics/MCA #10137, credits: Backing Vocals)
- Pop-o-Pies- "In Frisco" (1993- Amarillo #581, credits: Bass Guitar)
- Dieselhed- "Dieselhed" (1995- Amarillo #590, credits: Bass/Backing Vocals)
- Dieselhed- "Tales of a Brown Dragon" (1996- Amarillo #601, credits: Bass/Backing Vocals)
- Dieselhed- "Shallow Water Blackout" (1997- Amarillo #608, credits: Bass/Backing Vocals)
- Dieselhed- "Elephant Rest Home" (1999- Bongload BOOOOODFHN, credits: Bass/Backing Vocals)
- Richard Thompson- "Mock Tudor" (1999- Capitol #98860, credits: Electric Bass Guitar)
- Carl Hancock Rux- "Rux Review" (1999- Sony #69644, credits: Bass Guitar)
- Dieselhed- "Chico and the Flute" (2001- Bongload, credits: Bass/Backing Vocals)
- Richard Thompson- "Action Packed, The Capitol Years" (2001- Capitol #31051, credits: Electric Bass Guitar)
- Virgil Shaw- "Still Falling" (2003- Future Farmer BOOOO83MGL, credits: Bass Guitar)
- Chuck Prophet- "Age of Miracles" (2004- New West Records BOOO2UJKQS, credits: Bass guitar)
- Brittany Shane- "Brittany Shane" (2007- Brittany Shane #275569, credits: Bass Guitar)
- Neil Hamburger - "Sings Country Winners" (2008- Drag City Records DC363, credits: Bass/Ukulele)
- Neil Hamburger - "First of Dismay" (2014- Drag City Records DC599, credits: Bass)
- Sonny & The Sunsets - "Hairdressers From Heaven" (2019- Rocks In Your Head, credits: Electric Bass Guitar/Piano)
- Neil Hamburger - "Seasonal Depression Suite" (2023- Drag City Records DC894, credits: Bass)
- Flamin Groovies - "Revolution" (2025 Cleopatra Records, credits Bass, backup vocals)
