= Robert Dunne =

Robert Dunne may refer to:

- Robert Dunne (bishop) (1830–1917), Irish-born bishop and archbishop in Australia
- Robert J. Dunne (1899–1980), American football player and coach, and state court judge in Illinois
- Robbie Dunne (born 1979), Irish soccer player
- Steve Dunne (cricket umpire) (born 1943), born Robert Stephen Dunne, New Zealand cricket umpire

== See also ==
- Robert Done (1904–1982), English footballer
- Robert Donne, American musician and composer
- Robert Dunn (disambiguation)
