= Dieselhed =

American band

- Artist rendition. Road manager John Tynan appears top-left

Background information
- Origin: Arcata, California, U.S.
- Genres: Rock
- Years active: 1989–2000
- Labels: Amarillo; Bong Load
- Past members: Virgil Shaw; Zac Holtzman; Atom Ellis; Danny Heifetz; Shon McAllen; Jonathan Segel

Dieselhed was an American rock band originally from Arcata, California and later based in San Francisco.

== History ==
=== Early career ===
Dieselhed formed in 1989 in Arcata, California, later moving to San Francisco, California, playing a blend of country, punk, and pseudo-classic rock. Drummer Heifetz spread his time between Dieselhed and the genre-bending experimentalists Mr. Bungle. Singer-songwriter Virgil Shaw previously played in Arcata outfit Brent's T.V. Bassist Ellis had been a founding member of the local disbanded funk rock band Psychefunkapus, and Jonathan Segel was a former member of local indie-faves Camper Van Beethoven.

The band signed a recording contract with independent label Amarillo Records in the early 1990s. Dieselhed released three full-length albums for Amarillo while maintaining a national touring schedule throughout the 1990s, often accompanied by road manager John Tynan.

Dieselhed's self-titled 1993 debut was received well, leading to a modest spurt of college radio airplay. The band wound up selling out Amarillo's first two pressings of the album. Their second album, Tales of a Brown Dragon, came out in 1995 and helped to expand their growing fan base. Dieselhed became regulars at the SXSW music festival held each year in Austin, Texas. Their third album, 1997's Shallow Water Blackout, was produced by Dwight Yoakam engineer Dusty Wakeman. Dieselhed followed their 1997 release with two U.S. tours opening for Link Wray. For these dates Ellis and Heifitz would return to the stage after their opening set each night to back Wray. The two would go on to become Wray's regular backing band from 1997 to 2003.

=== Later years ===
In 1998 Dieselhed signed a new contract with Bong Load Records, a label still riding the success of their recording and release of Beck's critically acclaimed gold record Mellow Gold. Dieselhed issued Elephant Rest Home in 1998 (a collection of previously unreleased songs) and their final album, the rarely seen Chico and the Flute in 2000 on Bong Load before disbanding later in 2000.

Lead songwriter Virgil Shaw went on to release two critically acclaimed solo albums, Quad Cities and Still Falling, for San Francisco's independent label Future Farmer Records. Co-songwriter Zac Holtzman now plays in the Los Angeles-based band Dengue Fever. Danny Heifetz, now raising a family in Australia, stays busy with local studio session work and drum lessons. Atom Ellis resides between San Francisco and Los Angeles and performs as bassist with Neil Hamburger, The New Cars and The Tubes. Guitarist Shon McAllin is currently a licensed contractor residing in the deep woods of Northern California.

== Band members ==
- Virgil Shaw – guitar, vocals
- Zac Holtzman – guitar, vocals
- Atom Ellis – bass, bocals
- Danny Heifetz – drums, percussion, horns
- Shon McAlinn – lead guitar

=== Auxiliary members ===
- Jonathan Segel – violin (until 1994)
- Ralph Carney – various wind instruments
- Jeff Palmer – musical saw, drums on "Bright Lights"
- Josh Roberts – guitar, vocals, drums

== Discography ==
- Dieselhed (Amarillo 1994)
- Tales of a Brown Dragon (Amarillo 1995)
- Shallow Water Blackout (Amarillo 1997)
- Elephant Rest Home (Bong Load 1999)
- Chico and the Flute (Bong Load 2000)
