= New Jerusalem (film) =

- Directed by: Rick Alverson
- Screenplay by: Rick Alverson; Colm O'Leary
- Produced by: Rick Alverson; Courtney Bowles
- Starring: Will Oldham; Colm O'Leary; Roxanne Ferris; Thomas Bowles
- Cinematography: Rick Alverson
- Music by: Champ Bennet; Robert Donne
- Release date: January 31, 2011 (Rotterdam)
- Running time: 94 minutes
- Country: United States
- Language: English

New Jerusalem is a feature film directed, co-written, and co-produced by Rick Alverson that premiered in 2011 at the 40th International Film Festival Rotterdam and in the United States at SXSW. Independent music label Jagjaguwar executive produced and funded the film.

== Plot ==
The film focuses on the relationship between an Irish immigrant (Colm O'Leary), a veteran of the U.S. war in Afghanistan, and his American co-worker, an evangelical Christian (Will Oldham).
