= The Trashwomen =

American punk trio

- Origin: San Francisco Bay Area, California, United States
- Genres: Garage punk, surf punk
- Years active: 1991–1997, 2007–2008
- Label: Estrus Records
- Members: Tina Lucchesi; Dannielle Pimm; Elka Zolot

The Trashwomen were an all-female American garage punk and surf punk trio from the San Francisco Bay Area signed to Estrus Records.

== History ==
Formed in 1991 by Tina Lucchesi and Dannielle Pimm, and former Bitch Fight & later, Eight Ball Scratch guitarist, Elka Zolot, the band formed originally to perform a one-off show of Trashmen covers. Although Zolot was a skilled guitar player, Tina Lucchesi (drums) and Dannielle Pimm (bass) spent the four weeks before their premier show learning their instruments. The group quickly built a following in the San Francisco garage rock scene. The group's debut 1993 album on Estrus, Spend the Night With the Trashwomen was described by Allmusic as "a straight-up raw release of sleazy rock & roll." This was followed by a live album the following year and a third album in 1995, Trashwomen Vs. Deep Space, the latter two also released on German label Pin Up Records, which also issued the 1994 EP The Trashwomen Invade Chinatown. The band split up in 1997 after a tour of Japan, feeling that the band had run its course, but reunited in 2007 for a performance, staying together into 2008. The band described themselves as "the Queens of Tease Rock".

The band were paid a tribute by The Wongs in their song "Jerkin' It to the Trashwomen".

Tina Lucchesi is also the front woman for The Bobbyteens and for Tina & the Total Babes – this time in an otherwise male band – who released an album in 2001 on the Sympathy for the Record Industry label. Lucchesi has also played in several other bands including The Glamour Pussies, The Deadly Weapons, and The Count Backwards (with Pimm and Zolot), runs the Lipstick Records label, and also runs a hair salon and vintage clothing store, Down at Lulu's, in Oakland. Elka Zolot's daughter, Natassia, is a rapper and music video director who goes by the stage name of Kreayshawn.

== Discography ==
=== Albums ===
- Spend the Night With the Trashwomen (1993), Estrus
- Live! At Tom Guido's Purple Onion and Other Swinging Places (1994), Lazy Lizard/Pin Up
- Trashwomen vs. Deep Space (1995), Pin Up/Repent

=== Singles ===
- Lust EP (1992), Hillsdale
- "Aphrodesia" (1992), Hillsdale
- Three Birds EP (1994), Estrus
- The Trashwomen Invade Chinatown EP (1994), Pin Up

=== Compilation appearances ===
- Locked In To Surf & Rock 'n Roll Instrumentals 1 (1994), Alopecia!

"Surf Beat" (LP/CD), "Miser Lou" (CD)

- Locked In To Surf & Rock 'n Roll Instrumentals 2 (1995), Alopecia!

"Miser Lou"

- Surfin' Around The Worlds LP (1995), Pin Up

"Dragula", "Bumble Bee", "Nightmare At The Drag"

- That's Mighty Childish LP (1996), Vendetta

"Pretty Baby"

- Blood Orgy Of The Leather Girls Soundtrack LP, Planet Pimp

"Batteries"
