= Never Been Caught =

Studio album by the Mummies
- Released: 1992
- Genre: Garage punk
- Label: Telstar (TR005)

The Mummies chronology
The Mummies Play Their Own Records! (1992)	Never Been Caught (1992)	Party at Steve's House (1994)

Never Been Caught is the only full-length studio album by the American garage punk band the Mummies, released by Telstar Records in 1992. After their first attempt at recording an album, they judged the recordings too professional for their "budget rock" aesthetic and recorded Never Been Caught instead. Originally released only as an LP record, it exemplified their lo-fi, monaural sound and features several cover versions of songs from the 1950s and 1960s. The band broke up shortly before the album's release and, though they have reunited since for intermittent touring and performances, Never Been Caught remains their only officially-released studio album. In 2002 the Mummies allowed Telstar to re-release the album in compact disc format with five additional tracks, the first Mummies release (and only one other than their 2003 compilation album Death by Unga Bunga!!) to be issued on CD.

== Background and recording ==
Having released several singles the prior year, the Mummies entered the studio in February 1991 to record their first full-length album for the Crypt Records label. They judged the results too clean and tidy for their lo-fi "budget rock" aesthetic, and the recordings went unreleased until the bootleg recording Fuck the Mummies some years later. They made another attempt later that year, resulting in Never Been Caught.

Only eight of the album's 17 tracks are originals, all written by organist and saxophonist Trent Ruane. The other nine are cover versions, mostly of rock and roll, garage rock, and pop songs from the 1950s and 1960s. The oldest of these is "Jezebel", written by Wayne Shanklin and first recorded by Frankie Laine in 1951. "Skinny Minnie" was a Top 40 hit by Bill Haley & His Comets in 1958, while "Justine", also from 1958, was written and originally recorded by the duo Don and Dewey and was a staple for the Righteous Brothers beginning in the mid-1960s. "She Lied" was a 1964 single by the Rockin' Ramrods. "Stronger Than Dirt" was originally recorded by the Memphis, Tennessee group Tommy Burk and the Counts in 1965 under the pseudonym A. Jacks & the Cleansers, as the phrase "Stronger than dirt" was the slogan for Ajax brand household cleaning powder. "Come On Up" is a song by the Young Rascals from their 1966 debut album, while "Shot Down" is by the Sonics, from their 1966 album Boom. "Mariconda's a Friend of Mine" is a traditional song with a new arrangement written by the Mummies. Finally, "Sooprize Package for Mr. Mineo" is a 1991 song by the South San Francisco garage rock band Supercharger, who were contemporaries of the Mummies; the Mummies were fans of Supercharger and toured Europe with them in 1993.

== Release and reception ==
Professional ratings
Review scores
Source	Rating
AllMusic	4.5/5 stars
The Encyclopedia of Popular Music	4/5 stars

After recording Never Been Caught, the Mummies played many shows on the West Coast of the United States and toured Washington and Canada with Thee Headcoats. After a brief tour of the East Coast with performances in New York, Washington, D.C., and New Jersey, they returned to San Francisco in early January 1992 and broke up, shortly before the album's release on Telstar Records. Though they subsequently reunited for European tours in 1993 and 1994, and have performed intermittently since 2008, Never Been Caught remains their only officially-released full-length studio album.

Never Been Caught was released by Telstar in 1992. In keeping with the band's lo-fi aesthetic, it was given a monaural sound mix. In accordance with their disdain for the compact disc format, it was released only as an LP record and, like their other releases, bore the slogan "Fuck CDs" on the back cover. Also on the back cover was the message "If you liked this album at all, get the debut Supercharger LP. It fucking rules over this crap." The liner notes were written by Shane White of the fanzine Pure Filth.

In 2002, after the Mummies had been inactive for eight years, Telstar re-released the album on compact disc for its tenth anniversary, adding five additional tracks. The bonus tracks include all three songs from the Mummies' 1993 Sympathy for the Record Industry single "(You Must Fight to Live) On the Planet of the Apes"—the title track, "Whitecaps" (originally split into two parts on the single, combined into a single track for the CD), and a cover of the Beatles' "I'm Down"—as well as a cover of the Troggs' "Your Love" from the "Stronger Than Dirt" single (Telstar Records, 1992) and a cover of Sam the Sham and the Pharaohs' "Uncle Willie" from the 1994 Norton Records tribute album Turban Renewal: A Tribute to Sam the Sham and the Pharaohs. Shane White wrote updated liner notes for this release, explaining why the Mummies had finally consented to a CD release of their material: "Happy to give back whatever stupid punk rock credibility anyone had ever given them (and that wasn't much), they gave ol' Telstar the okay to re-issue their one and only legitimate long player onto the now dated CD format. That, plus their one hit single and a couple other 'bonus' tracks. So, why the hell not? [...] Go ahead, see just how good your hi-end CD player sounds now. And that's just the way they want it. Best do it legit before the bootleggers do it, and they will, just like they have in the past."

Writing for AllMusic, reviewer Mark Deming called the album "one of the most gloriously ugly garage albums ever [...] Sounding like it was recorded in an acoustically untreated basement on equipment that might have been state of the art in 1947, Never Been Caught is one long blast of monophonic skwak, with the needles almost perpetually in the red as four guys in mummy outfits bash out crude '60s-style rock about beer, babes, and open hostility on battered gear which was doubtless discarded by tone-deaf teenagers who got over their 15-minute delusion of possible future rock stardom in 1966. In case you haven't figured it out by now, this album is, quite simply, a work of genius [...] a perfect reminder that once upon a time rock & roll was considered dangerous just for being fast, loud, and snotty". Of the compact disc release, he remarked that it was "hard to say how [Telstar] managed to blackmail the CD-loathing former Mummies into consenting to such a thing, but thankfully the disc (augmented with five bonus tracks) sounds just as flat and distorted as the original LP...nice to know some things never change."

== Track listing ==
Side A
No.	Title	Writer(s)	Length
1.	"Your Ass (Is Next in Line)"	Trent Ruane	2:19
2.	"Stronger Than Dirt" (originally performed by A. Jacks & the Cleansers)	Tommy Burk	2:11
3.	"Little Miss Tee-N-T"	Ruane	2:19
4.	"Come On Up" (originally performed by the Young Rascals)	Felix Cavaliere	2:11
5.	"Sooprize Package for Mr. Mineo" (originally performed by Supercharger)	Darin Raffaelli, Greg Lowery, Karen Singletary	1:50
6.	"Rosie"	Ruane	2:48
7.	"Shot Down" (originally performed by the Sonics)	Gerry Roslie	1:58
8.	"The Ballad of Iron Eyes Cody"	Ruane	2:04

Side B
No.	Title	Writer(s)	Length
9.	"Skinny Minnie" (originally performed by Bill Haley & His Comets)	Bill Haley, Arrett "Rusty" Keefer, Catherine Cafra, Milt Gabler	2:07
10.	"She Lied" (originally performed by the Rockin' Ramrods)	Vin Campisi, Bill Linnane	1:58
11.	"The Red Cobra #9"	Ruane	2:15
12.	"The Frisko Freeze"	Ruane	1:18
13.	"Justine" (originally performed by Don and Dewey)	Don "Sugarcane" Harris, Dewey Terry	1:57
14.	"Mariconda's a Friend of Mine"	traditional; arranged by the Mummies	2:08
15.	"The Thing from Venus"	Ruane	1:58
16.	"Shut Yer Mouth"	Ruane	1:57
17.	"Jezebel" (originally performed by Frankie Laine)	Wayne Shanklin	2:39

Bonus tracks on compact disc re-release
No.	Title	Writer(s)	Length
18.	"(You Must Fight to Live) On the Planet of the Apes" (1993 single)	Ruane	2:54
19.	"Whitecaps" (parts I & II; from the "(You Must Fight to Live) On the Planet of the Apes" single, 1993)	Jaguars, Larry Winther
20.	"I'm Down" (originally performed by the Beatles; from the "(You Must Fight to Live) On the Planet of the Apes" single, 1993)	John Lennon, Paul McCartney	1:58
21.	"Your Love" (originally performed by the Troggs; from the "Stronger Than Dirt" single, 1992)	Larry Page, Michael Julien	1:37
22.	"Uncle Willie" (originally performed by Sam the Sham and the Pharaohs; from Turban Renewal: A Tribute to Sam the Sham and the Pharaohs, 1994)	Tommy Cosden	2:38

== Personnel ==
The Mummies

- Trent Ruane – organ, saxophone, lead vocals
- Larry Winther – guitar, backing vocals
- Maz Kattuah – bass guitar, backing vocals
- Russell Quan – drums

Production and packaging

- J. Lesser – audio mastering of CD re-release
- Sven-Erik Geddes – photographs in both original LP release and CD re-release
- "Uncle" Mike Lucas – photographs in both original LP release and CD re-release
- Shane White – liner notes in both original LP release and CD re-release; photographs in CD re-release
