= Great Phone Calls Featuring Neil Hamburger =

Studio album by Neil Hamburger
- Released: 1992; July 4, 2000 (Re-Issue)
- Genres: Comedy, Prank Calls
- Length: 48:34
- Labels: Amarillo Records; Ipecac Recordings
- Producer: Neil Hamburger

Neil Hamburger chronology
Great Phone Calls; Featuring Neil Hamburger (1992)	America's Funnyman (1996)

Professional ratings
Review scores
Source	Rating
Allmusic	4.5/5 stars

Great Phone Calls Featuring Neil Hamburger is a 1992 album by alternative comedian Neil Hamburger. It was originally released by Amarillo Records in 1992 and then re-issued on Ipecac Recordings in 2000 with 7 extra tracks.

== Track listing ==
1. "I'm In Your Band" (5:56)
2. "Cancel It!" (0:23)
3. "Hijinx" (4:16)
4. "Hijinx and a Child" (2:48)
5. "A Score to Settle" (2:14)
6. "Blood Pizza" (1:03)
7. "Graduate of Yaoo" (3:16)
8. "(Write My) Name on the Toilet" (2:00)
9. "You're Not Good Enough" (2:40)
10. "A Special Request" (2:45)
11. "Rock & Roll" (3:08)
12. "Pickle Potato" (1:45)
13. "The Man from Hott" (1:30)
14. "Music of the Night" (featuring Mike Patton) (1:03)
15. "A Nationally-Known Comedian" (6:16)
16. "I Got Shot" (1:13)
17. "Nude Models" (0:33)
18. "MHC" (1:10)
19. "Nobody Seems to Love Me" (1:07)
20. "SF Hotline" (1:17)
21. "Friends" (1:06)
22. "Pablo Cruise Fan Club" (1:05)
