= The Mountain (2018 film) =

2018 American drama film

- Theatrical release poster
- Directed by: Rick Alverson
- Written by: Rick Alverson; Dustin Guy Defa; Colm O'Leary
- Produced by: Sara Murphy; Ryan Zacarias; Eddy Moretti; Allison Rose Carter
- Starring: Tye Sheridan; Denis Lavant; Hannah Gross; Udo Kier; Jeff Goldblum
- Cinematography: Lorenzo Hagerman
- Edited by: Rick Alverson; Michael Taylor
- Music by: Robert Donne; Daniel Lopatin
- Production companies: VICE Studios; Made Bed; Remergence
- Distributed by: Kino Lorber
- Release dates: August 30, 2018 (Venice); July 26, 2019 (United States)
- Running time: 106 minutes
- Country: United States
- Language: English
- Box office: $59,790

The Mountain is a 2018 American drama film directed by Rick Alverson, from a screenplay by Alverson, Dustin Guy Defa and Colm O'Leary. The script is loosely based on the story of controversial physician Walter Freeman. It stars Tye Sheridan, Denis Lavant, Hannah Gross, Udo Kier and Jeff Goldblum. It had its world premiere at the Venice Film Festival on August 30, 2018. It was released on July 26, 2019, by Kino Lorber.

== Plot ==
In the 1950s, young introvert Andy (Sheridan) works at his father Frederick's (Kier) ice rink following the institutionalization, lobotomization, and presumed death of his mother. After Frederick dies suddenly on the ice, Andy encounters family friend Dr. Wallace Fiennes (Goldblum), the man responsible for his mother's lobotomy. He invites Andy to travel with him, having Andy act as his photographer, journalist, and assistant.

The duo travel from asylum to asylum, Wallace performing lobotomies while Andy reluctantly documents. At night, Andy repeatedly attempts to contact his mother's spirit using a planchette. On one occasion, Andy meets a woman who tells him that her daughter Susan is a patient at their next destination. There, they meet Jack (Lavant) and his daughter, Susan (Gross). Jack requests that Wallace perform a lobotomy on Susan, who has been exhibiting rebellious behavior. While Wallace prepares his equipment in the other room, Susan seduces Andy and they start having sex. Wallace interrupts them, then performs the procedure.

Later that night, Andy sneaks out and hitchhikes back to Jack's house, where a drunken Jack rants about life and art in a mixture of French and English. While initially unresponsive, Susan displays affection towards Andy after he touches her. At the next institution, Andy watches as an insubordinate patient is dragged across a hallway by hospital employees. Andy repeats the behavior, destroying the chairs in the hallway and shouting at the hospital attendants just as the patient had before being restrained. Wallace questions Andy, during which he states that Susan was his first sexual encounter, that he believes his dreams are real, and that he believes it has been his mother's spirit communicating through the planchette. Andy subsequently submits to being lobotomized.

Wallace drops Andy off at Jack's home and departs. Andy and Susan attend one of Jack's music therapy sessions. Andy takes Jack's car and drives Susan down a snowy mountain road. He brings the car to a rest, gets out and stands in the snow, shivering and looking toward the mountain's peak.

== Cast ==
- Tye Sheridan as Andy
- Jeff Goldblum as Dr. Wallace Fiennes
- Denis Lavant as Jack
- Hannah Gross as Susan
- Udo Kier as Frederick
- Eleonore Hendricks as Grace
- Paul Eenhoorn as Man In Car
- Larry Fessenden as Meals
- Max Baker as State Doctor
- Buddy Duress as Phillip Farmer (uncredited)

== Release ==
The film premiered at the 75th Venice International Film Festival on August 30, 2018. It also screened at the Sundance Film Festival on January 25, 2019. That same month, Kino Lorber acquired U.S. distribution rights. It was released on July 26, 2019.

== Reception ==
The film received generally mixed reviews following its premiere at the Venice Film Festival, though Goldblum's performance as Dr. Fiennes earned universal praise. Eric Kohn of IndieWire praised the film, saying it is the "warmest and most inviting work from a director who traffics in an acquired taste." Guy Lodge, writing for Variety, wrote that "Alverson's serene affectations serve a stern, stark thesis about our evolving understanding of mental health, as well as America's dubious romanticization of its heartland."

Peter Bradshaw at The Guardian was less enthusiastic, commending Jeff Goldblum's supporting turn and finding aspects of the film "rather brilliant" but that it ultimately "succumbs to a rather banal inability to decide where to take the story."

As of October 2021, 64% of the 58 critical reviews compiled on Rotten Tomatoes are positive, with an average of 5.8/10. The website's critics consensus reads: "The Mountain finds its provocative director further honing his craft -- but formal flair and an engrossing Jeff Goldblum performance may not be enough to sway the unconverted."
