= Hot February Night =

Studio album by Neil Hamburger
- Released: 2007; 2010 (Re-Issue)
- Recorded: February 2007
- Genre: Comedy
- Length: 32:56
- Label: Off-Price Value Center; Drag City
- Producer: Neil Hamburger Gregg Turkington Ryan Bromley

Neil Hamburger chronology
Great Moments at Di Presa's Pizza House (2005)	Hot February Night (2007)	Neil Hamburger Sings Country Winners (2008)

Professional ratings
Review scores
Source	Rating
Tiny Mix Tapes	4/5 stars
Under the Radar	6/10 stars

Hot February Night is a 2007 album by alternative comedian Neil Hamburger. It was originally released by Off-Price Value Center in 2007 and then re-issued on LP by Drag City in 2010.

== Album synopsis ==
The album was not recorded live in Madison Square Gardens as popularly believed, though Hamburger did perform there acting as the opening act to Tenacious D. In fact, the album was pieced together from three shows recorded near the conclusion of that same tour, at Queen Elizabeth Theatre in Vancouver, Canada, the Paramount Theater in Seattle, Washington, and the Arlene Schnitzer Concert Hall, in Portland, Oregon. A number of times throughout the album Hamburger mocks the crowd for their impatience and insults them by pretending to announce the band only to quickly change tack and continue on with the act.

== Track listing ==
1. "Christmas/Godfather" (6:38)
2. "Rock and Roll Will Never Die" (1:04)
3. "Shoulder Trouble '07" (0:10)
4. "Wonderful Wonderful" (4:21)
5. "Destroying the Mood" (2:10)
6. "Incident in Kabul" (1:55)
7. "Beatle Paul" (4:47)
8. "Decrepit Old Dogs" (2:45)
9. "Cranberry Sauce" (6:45)
10. "His Deathbed" (2:26)
