= Pop-O-Pies =

American punk rock band

- Origin: San Francisco, California, United States
- Genres: Punk rock
- Years active: 1981–1993
- Labels: 415; Subterranean; Amarillo
- Spinoff of: Mr. Bungle, Faith No More
- Past members: Joe Pop-O-Pie; Billy Gould; Mark Bowen; Mike Bordin; Elron Hubbard; Roddy Bottum; Jeff Ruzich; Ben Cohen; Mike King; Johnny Gilliland; Kirk Heydt; Trey Spruance; Atom Ellis; Danny Heifetz; Klaus Flouride; Darryl Hell (aka Darryl Montgomery)
- Website: pop-o-pies.com

The Pop-O-Pies were an American punk rock band from San Francisco, California founded by Joe Callahan (aka Joe Pop-O-Pie) that got their start by playing a set that only consisted of a 45 minute punk rock cover of The Grateful Dead's "Truckin"".Though the band went through many lineup changes, notably featuring members of Mr. Bungle and Faith No More, several recordings would follow. All of them, except for The White EP, can be found on the 2003 CD compilation Pop-O-Anthology 1984-1993.

The Pop-O-Pies were called "absolutely the worst band in California" by the Los Angeles Times.

== Discography ==
Singles

- "Truckin'" (7", 1981)
- "In Frisco" (7", 1993)

EPs

- The White EP (12", 1981)
- Joe's Second Record (12", 1984)

Albums

- Joe's Third Record (LP, 1985)

Compilations

- Pop-O-Anthology 1984-1993 (CD, 2003)
