= 94124 =

EP by Zip Code Rapists
- Released: 1995
- Genre: Avant-garde, punk revival
- Length: 21:12
- Label: Amarillo

Professional ratings
Review scores
| Source | Rating |
|---|---|
| Allmusic | 3/5 stars |

94124 is a 1995 EP by the avant-garde band Zip Code Rapists.

== Reception ==
AllMusic awarded the album three stars and its review by Greg Prato said:

Like the Stooges, Dead Boys, and Suicide before them, Zip Code Rapists turn out to be proud carriers of the confrontational-rock torch. Proceed with extreme caution.".

== Track listing ==
| No. | Title | Writer(s) | Length |
|---|---|---|---|
| 1. | "The Look of Love" | Burt Bacharach, Hal David |
| 2. | "Zip Code Gentlemen" | Danny Heifetz, John Singer, Gregg Turkington |
| 3. | "Ranch Style Beans" | Singer, Turkington |
| 4. | "I Need Him" | Russ Saul |
| 5. | "Henderson" | Singer, Turkington |
| 6. | "Happy Like Larry (He Taught Me How to Die)" | Lee Hughey |
| 7. | "Riders on the Storm" | The Doors |
| 8. | "Zip Code Gentlemen" (re-mix/filler) | Heifetz, Singer, Turkington |

== Personnel ==
- Scott Colburn – engineer
- Danny Heifetz – clavinet, drums, percussion
- Margaret Murray – artwork, photography
- John Singer – bass, guitar, keyboards, optigan, backing vocals
- Wally Sound – bass, lap steel guitar
- Gregg Turkington – illustrations, loops, tape, vocals
- Barney Virus – engineer
