= Hide Your Smiling Faces =

- Theatrical release poster
- Directed by: Daniel Patrick Carbone
- Screenplay by: Daniel Patrick Carbone
- Produced by: Jordan Bailey-Hoover; Daniel Patrick Carbone; Matthew Petock; Zachary Shedd
- Starring: Ryan Jones; Nathan Varnson; Colm O'Leary; Thomas Cruz; Christina Starbuck; Chris Kies
- Cinematography: Nick Bentgen
- Edited by: Daniel Patrick Carbone
- Music by: Robert Donne
- Production company: Flies
- Distributed by: Tribeca Film
- Release dates: February 10, 2013 (BIFF); March 25, 2014 (United States)
- Running time: 80 minutes
- Country: United States
- Language: English

Hide Your Smiling Faces is a 2013 American drama film written and directed by Daniel Patrick Carbone about the story of two brothers who have their summer vacation ruined by a tragedy. The film stars Ryan Jones, Nathan Varnson, Colm O'Leary, Thomas Cruz, Christina Starbuck and Chris Kies. The film was released on March 25, 2014, by Tribeca Film.

== Cast ==
- Ryan Jones as Tommy
- Nathan Varnson as Eric
- Colm O'Leary as Ian's Father
- Thomas Cruz as Tristan
- Christina Starbuck as Mother
- Chris Kies as Father
- Andrew M. Chamberlain as Blake
- Clark Middleton as Religious Man
- Ivan Tomic as Ian

== Release ==
The film premiered at the 63rd Berlin International Film Festival on February 10, 2013. The film was released on March 25, 2014, by Tribeca Film.

== Reception ==
On review aggregator website Rotten Tomatoes, the film holds an approval rating of 84% based on 49 reviews. The site's critical consensus reads, "Its meditative pace and low-key approach may prove too ponderous for some, but Hide Your Smiling Faces will cast a potent spell on viewers patient enough to let it unfold."
