= The White EP (Pop-O-Pies EP) =

EP by Pop-O-Pies
- Released: 1982
- Genre: Punk rock
- Label: 415
- Producer: David Kahne

Professional ratings
Review scores
Source	Rating
Robert Christgau	A−

The White EP is the recording debut of San Francisco punk rock group Pop-O-Pies. It was released by 415 Records in 1982. The six-song EP includes their cover of the Grateful Dead classic "Truckin'," which for several months in late 1981 became the most requested song on the San Francisco college radio station KUSF.

In 1982, Jerry Garcia heard "Truckin'" and immediately became a big fan of the band.
