= Neil Hamburger =

Standup comedian character

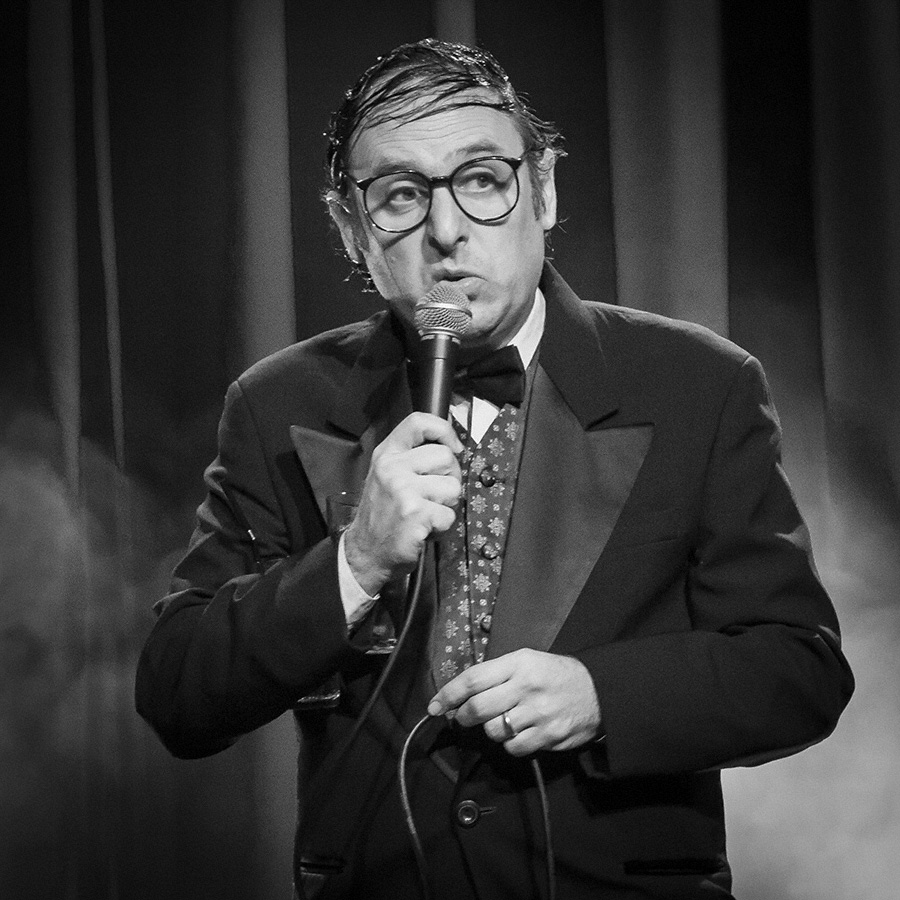
- Turkington performing as Hamburger in 2016
- First appearance: Great Phone Calls Featuring Neil Hamburger (1992)
- Created by: Gregg Turkington
- Portrayed by: Gregg Turkington

In-universe information
- Occupation: Standup comedian; singer
- Genres: Anti-comedy; popular music
- Website: americasfunnyman.com

Neil Hamburger is a standup comedian and singer character created and portrayed by American entertainer Gregg Turkington. Distinguished for his misanthropic jokes and anti-comedy style, Turkington has released a number of albums as Hamburger and has appeared as the character in various films, television shows, and other media. In 2015, the act inspired the feature-length film Entertainment, which stars Turkington as a "variant" of the character.

Turkington developed the sad-sack comedian character in the 1990s and originally envisioned the concept as a "weird recording project."

Hamburger originated from a prank call titled "A Nationally Known Comedian" that appeared on the album Great Phone Calls Featuring Neil Hamburger (1992). He followed the LP with three additional albums issued on Drag City Records before he began receiving offers to perform as the character for live shows.

He later branched out into singing and his albums Neil Hamburger Sings Country Winners (2009) and First of Dismay (2014) feature original songs and cover versions backed by "The Too Good For Neil Hamburger Band".

== Style ==
Hamburger's standup act consists largely of intentionally stilted and abrasive question/answer jokes about celebrity targets. One profile described him as "a glum, middle-aged, tuxedo-clad man, with greasy comb-over hair, awkwardly sized glasses and a rasp magnified by a ghost lodging in his throat he perpetually pauses to clear—as if he's working up a world record-tying loogie." Another characterized him as a "blowhard, old-school comedian" who is "regularly berating his increasingly agitated audiences." He's been called a conceptual comedian whose main concept is to not be funny.

Vulture wrote of his stage presence:

Most distinctive are his vocal stylings. In between attempts to clear his throat that sound as if he's gargling with a gallon of phlegm, he delivers riddles in a querulous yowl, spacing out each word as if to abrade his audience's eardrums: "Why ... Why ... Why does Madonna feed her baby Alpo brand dog food? ... Because that's what comes out of her breasts." Actually, that's one of his more conventionally offensive jokes. Many of them don't even have recognizable punchlines. Hecklers, meanwhile, are met with protracted tongue-lashings...

The confrontational aspects of Hamburger's act have drawn comparisons to Tony Clifton. For people who attend his shows expecting a traditional standup comedian, walkouts and heckling are a common occurrence.

His signature catchphrase "But that's my life!" punctuates many of his groaners and failed punchlines.

== Career ==
Turkington's first Neil Hamburger recordings were self-recorded, imagining an unfunny, poorly recorded self-released stand-up comedy act. Turkington used recordings of audience laughter that were intentionally out of sync with his jokes, to replicate the private pressing albums by outsider artists that he enjoyed.

These early recordings found a cult audience, which led to record label Drag City issuing his album America's Funnyman in 1996. Several more albums were issued on the record label. These albums featured crowd chatter, clinking glasses, and ambient club noise, but were all made in studio.

And because Hamburger was only appearing on albums and never in clubs, some thought the character was an elaborate hoax.

But after originally conceiving Hamburger to be a studio-only character, Turkington was convinced to perform as the character on stage. His first such shows were supporting punk rock band Frenzal Rhomb, who flew Turkington from the United States to Australia especially for the performance. Neil Hamburger later appeared in the music videos for "Ballchef" and "Punisher" on their 2003 album Sans Souci.

In 2000, Hamburger opened for the band Trans Am on their North America tour.

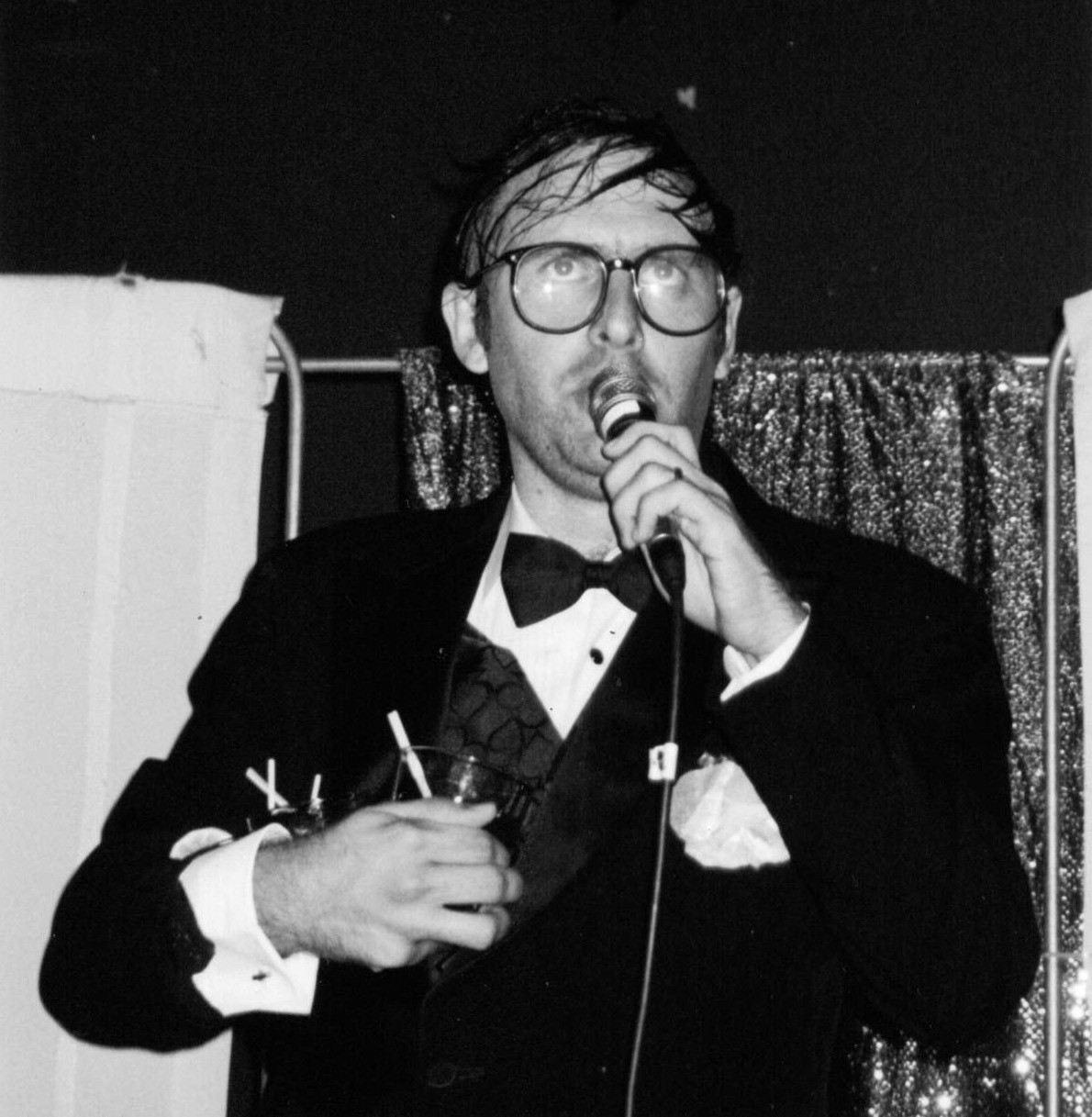
Turkington as Neil Hamburger in Portland, Oregon, 2004

Hamburger was a frequent guest on the Internet talk show Tom Green's House Tonight (2006–2013). In 2006, Hamburger started doing his own show called Poolside Chats with Neil Hamburger on The Channel at Tomgreen.com. Guests on his show have included Tim and Eric, Kyle Gass of Tenacious D, Buzz Osborne of the Melvins, and Bonnie "Prince" Billy.

In 2006, Hamburger had a cameo appearance in the film Tenacious D in the Pick of Destiny. Over the next year, he opened for Tenacious D during their Pick of Destiny tour. His performances incited mostly negative reactions, including booing and heckling in Ireland and England. His performance at Madison Square Garden was referred to by Sia Michel of The New York Times as likely "the greatest night of his career."

In 2008, Drag City released an album of country and western originals and covers recorded by Hamburger. During the sessions, Hamburger was backed by musicians including Prairie Prince of The Tubes and Todd Rundgren's band, David Gleason, Atom Ellis of Dieselhed and the New Cars, and Rachel Haden from That Dog.

In December 2010, Special Entertainment released an iPhone App called Shaky Advice from Neil Hamburger that functions much like a Magic 8 Ball, with 30 video clips of Hamburger giving comical advice.

In 2011, Hamburger was attacked onstage by a woman in Calgary who was mad about his act.

In 2015, the Neil Hamburger act was dramatized for the Rick Alverson film Entertainment. In it, the character is shown repeatedly on- and offstage, as well as the life of a fictional portrayal of the man behind the act separate from the real Gregg Turkington. The film's script was written by Turkington, Alverson, and comedian Tim Heidecker, although the dialogue was improvised.

In 2021, Neil Hamburger won "Best Guest Host" of Tim Heidecker's podcast Office Hours.

== Discography ==
=== Albums ===
- Great Phone Calls Featuring Neil Hamburger (1992)
- America's Funnyman (1996)
- Raw Hamburger (1998)
- Left for Dead in Malaysia (1999)
- 50 States, 50 Laughs (2000)
- Laugh Out Lord (2002)
- Great Moments at Di Presa's Pizza House (2005)
- Hot February Night (2007)
- Neil Hamburger Sings Country Winners (2008)
- Live at Third Man (2012)
- Incident in Cambridge, Massachusetts (2012)
- First of Dismay (2014)
- Still Dwelling (2019)
- Seasonal Depression Suite (2023)

=== EPs ===
- Looking for Laughs EP – Amarillo Records (1994)
- Bartender, the Laugh's on Me!!!! EP – Planet Pimp Records (1995)
- Open Ended Interview with Neil Hamburger (promotional 7-inch) – Drag City (1997)
- Neil Hamburger Pays Tribute to Diana, Princess of Wales EP – Planet Pimp Records (1997)
- Inside Neil Hamburger EP – Drag City (2000)
- Hamburger Remembers Nixon 7-inch – I Don't Feel a Thing Records (2002)
- Souvenir Record (tour split 7-inch with Pleaseeasaur) (2008)
- American Exports 7-inch (with the Hard-Ons) – Red Lounge Records (2009), reissued by Alternative Tentacles (2011)
- Alive (With Pleasure) (bootleg 7-inch) (2012)
- A Bruise Cruise Souvenir Record 7-inch – Bruise Cruise Records (2012)

=== Appearances ===
- RRRecords – America the Beautiful (compilation) (on "That's My Life") (1994)
- Planet Pimp Records – Good Tyme Jhambhoree (compilation) (on "Promo Spot #1" and "Promo Spot #2") (1995)
- Amarillo Records – You Gan't Boar Like an Eabla When you Work with Turkrys (on "Looking for Laughs" and "Great Phone Calls") (1996)
- Giardia – Muckraker #8 (compilation) (on "Ten Minutes after Checking into the Motel 6") (1997)
- Tedium House – My Baby Does Good Sculptures (compilation) (on "Comedy Fated from the Stars") (1997)
- The Phantom Surfers – XXX Party (on "Special Guest Guffaws") (2000)
- Mark Prindle – Only the Good Die Young: An All-Star Tribute to Mark Prindle (1973–2058) (on "Special Celebrity Endorsement") (2001)
- Joe Beats – Indie Rock Blues (on "It's Expected I'm Gone / Open Ended Interview") (2005)
- Comedy Central – Comedy Death-Ray (compilation) (on "Neil Hamburger") (2008)

== Filmography ==
=== DVDs ===
- The Show Must Go Off!: Neil Hamburger Live at the Phoenix Greyhound Park (2003)
- The World's Funnyman (2006)
- Western Music and Variety (2009)

=== Movie appearances ===
- Circuit 8: Volume 8 (as himself) (2001)
- The Amazing Adventures of Pleaseeasaur (as himself) (2006)
- Tenacious D in The Pick of Destiny (as himself) (2006)
- Coco Lipshitz: Behind the Laughter (as himself) (2009)
- Hamlet A.D.D. (as Osric) (2014)
- Entertainment (an interpretation of the character) (2015)
- Mr. Bungle: The Night They Came Home (as himself) (2020)

=== Television appearances ===
- Free Radio (VH1)
- Jimmy Kimmel Live! (ABC)
- Red Eye with Greg Gutfeld (Fox News)
- Tom Green Live! (ManiaTV!)
- Tom Green's House Tonight (The Comedy Network)
- Tim and Eric Awesome Show, Great Job! (Adult Swim)
- Tim and Eric Nite Live! (Super Deluxe)
- The New Big Ball with Neil Hamburger (Adult Swim)
- The Comedy Can Television Series (The Comedy Network)
- The Movie Show (SBS One)
- Recovery (ABC Australia)
- Special Sauce (Starz)

=== Music video appearances ===
- "Punisher" (Frenzal Rhomb, 2003)
- "Ball Chef" (Frenzal Rhomb, 2003)
- "Conspiracy of the Gods" (Trans Am, 2007)
- "I'm Alright" (Ugly Kid Joe, 2015)
