= The Comedy (film) =

- Theatrical release poster
- Directed by: Rick Alverson
- Written by: Rick Alverson; Robert Donne; Colm O'Leary
- Produced by: Mike S. Ryan; Brent Kunkle
- Starring: Tim Heidecker; Eric Wareheim; James Murphy; Gregg Turkington; Kate Lyn Sheil; Alexia Rasmussen; Jeff Jensen
- Cinematography: Mark Schwartzbard
- Edited by: Rick Alverson; Michael Taylor
- Production companies: Greyshack Films; Glass Eye Pix; Made Bed Productions; Jagjaguwar; Rough House Pictures
- Distributed by: Tribeca Films
- Release date: January 21, 2012 (Sundance Film Festival); VOD: Oct 24, 2012; Theatrical: Nov 9, 2012
- Running time: 94 minutes
- Country: United States
- Language: English

The Comedy is a 2012 American drama film co-written, co-edited, and directed by Rick Alverson, and starring Tim Heidecker, Eric Wareheim, James Murphy, and Gregg Turkington. The film was executive produced by David Gordon Green, Danny McBride, Jody Hill, Darius Van Arman, and Larry Fessenden.

It premiered at the 2012 Sundance Film Festival and screened within such festivals as Maryland Film Festival 2012. The film was distributed by Tribeca Film and theatrically released on November 9, 2012. It went nationwide on demand starting October 24, 2012.

Despite the title and use of comedians as actors, Sundance festival chief programmer Trevor Groth says that the film is not a comedy, but instead "a provocation, a critique of a culture based at its core around irony and sarcasm and about ultimately how hollow that is."

The film was deliberately leaked onto various torrent websites, though the file only shows the first ten minutes before abruptly cutting to Heidecker sitting silently on a boat behind a scrolling anti-piracy statement.

== Plot ==
Swanson (Heidecker) is an aging, upper class hipster who alternately feels apathy and resentment towards his surroundings. He lives on a boat and spends his time partying and wandering around Brooklyn with his equally privileged friends, humorlessly ridiculing the various people they encounter. In the beginning of the film, his father is comatose, and Swanson is set to inherit his estate. He mentions having a brother who is institutionalized, though it is unclear where. The only familiar connection he has appears to be his sister-in-law (Liza Kate).

The film has no clear narrative, instead showing vignettes of Swanson's offensive behavior as he improvises situations to make strangers and acquaintances uncomfortable. Swanson and his buddies (Eric Wareheim, James Murphy, Richard Swift) continuously mock their less intelligent friend Cargill (Jeff Jensen) after he confesses they are important to him. Cargill continues spending time with them regardless. Swanson flirts with a woman at a party while sarcastically praising Hitler. She's sleeping naked in Swanson's boat the next morning, and he solemnly ferries her back to land. Swanson and his friends visit a church, where they desecrate various objects and cause a scene. Swanson visits a bar in Harlem alone, flaunting his wealth and insulting the African-American patrons by suggesting he gentrify the place. At one point, Swanson pays a cab driver 400 dollars to let him drive the car, only to speed recklessly and harass a woman on the street.

Growing bored, Swanson finds part-time work as a dishwasher. His ironic sense of humor attracts the attention of a waitress (Kate Lyn Sheil), who he later takes onto his boat. As Swanson awkwardly fails to make a move, the woman suffers a seizure. Rather than help, he watches her with vague interest. One night, Swanson's friend Van (Wareheim) shows their group a slideshow of photos from his childhood, interspersing vintage pornographic images as a gag. Despite some initial laughs, the group eventually falls silent and everyone appears apathetic. In the final sequence, Swanson visits the beach, where he plays in the water with a young child, an activity he seems to genuinely enjoy.

== Cast ==
- Tim Heidecker as Swanson
- Eric Wareheim as Van Harman
- Jeffrey Jensen as Cargill
- James Murphy as Ben
- Gregg Turkington as Bobby
- Kate Lyn Sheil as the waitress
- Liza Kate as Swanson's sister-in-law
- Alexia Rasmussen as the young woman
- Richard Swift as Richard

== Reception ==
The film received mixed reviews from critics. It received an aggregate rating of 50% on Rotten Tomatoes based on 36 reviews, and 46% on Metacritic based on the opinions of 15 critics (indicating "mixed or average reviews"). For example, David Lewis of the San Francisco Chronicle wrote that the film was "one of the most self-indulgent, pretentious and unfunny movies of the year", while Scott Tobias of The A.V. Club gave the film an "A−" rating, writing that "few films have better articulated the limits of irony as a force field against the world". Aaron Hillis of The Village Voice called it "transgressively brilliant... an itchy critique of entitlement starring avant-garde comedian Tim Heidecker as one of Williamsburg's overprivileged". The film has drawn comparisons to both La Dolce Vita and The Idiots.

The film had a limited theatrical release, grossing $41,113 in four theaters over eight weeks.

== See also ==
- The Disintegration Loops, featured on the film's soundtrack.
- New Sincerity
- Criticism of postmodernism
- White privilege
- Alternative comedy
