= Raw Hamburger =

Studio album by Neil Hamburger
- Released: February 2nd, 1998
- Genre: Comedy
- Length: 31:57
- Label: Drag City
- Producer: Neil Hamburger

Neil Hamburger chronology
Neil Hamburger Pays Tribute to Diana, Princess of Wales (1997)	Raw Hamburger (1998)	Left for Dead in Malaysia (1999)

Professional ratings
Review scores
Source	Rating
Allmusic	4.5/5 stars

Raw Hamburger is a 1999 album by alternative comedian Neil Hamburger. It was released by Drag City on February 2, 1999.

== Track listing ==
1. "Introduction" (0:28)
2. "Stewardesses" (1:09)
3. "Freebasing" (1:51)
4. "Snoop Doggy Dogg" (0:55)
5. "Cursing" (4:02)
6. "Bestiality" (1:39)
7. "Fags" (0:44)
8. "Beaver" (1:41)
9. "Comedians' Wives" (1:36)
10. "Divorce" (2:19)
11. "Naked Cheerleaders" (1:55)
12. "Cloning" (0:11)
13. "Dirty Diapers" (0:17)
14. "Living Life on the Edge" (1:20)
15. "Movies" (3:54)
16. "The Right to Die" (3:42)
17. "Alzheimer's" (0:46)
18. "AIDS" (0:38)
19. "She Sits Among the Cabbages and Peas" (2:50)
