= Great Moments at Di Presa's Pizza House =

Studio album by Neil Hamburger
- Released: April 19, 2005
- Genre: Comedy
- Length: 30:27
- Label: Drag City
- Producer: Neil Hamburger

Neil Hamburger chronology
Laugh Out Lord (2002)	Great Moments at Di Presa's Pizza House (2005)	Hot February Night (2007)

Professional ratings
Review scores
Source	Rating
AllMusic	3/5 stars

Great Moments at Di Presa's Pizza House is a 2005 album by alternative comedian Neil Hamburger, which is presented as an audio documentary. It was released by Drag City on April 19, 2005.

== Track listing ==
1. "Welcome to Di Presa's Pizza House" (1:20)
2. "Rememerable Memories" (1:41)
3. "May 31, 1962" (2:25)
4. "Flour Power" (2:37)
5. "Throwing Away Neil's Paycheck" (2:45)
6. "Big Heart" (2:17)
7. "Di Presa's Tries Some Different Things" (3:39)
8. "Bad Reviews" (2:27)
9. "Bad Pizza" (2:35)
10. "Summer of 2004" (2:25)
11. "Tragedy" (1:30)
12. "More Tragedies" (2:31)
13. "Selling Di Presa's" (2;15)
