= 50 States, 50 Laughs =

Studio album by Neil Hamburger
- Released: 2000
- Genre: Comedy
- Length: 26:36
- Label: Million Dollar Performances
- Producer: Neil Hamburger

Neil Hamburger chronology
| Inside Neil Hamburger (2000) | 50 States, 50 Laughs (2000) | Laugh Out Lord (2002) |

Professional ratings
Review scores
| Source | Rating |
|---|---|
| AllMusic | 4/5 stars |

50 States, 50 Laughs is a 2000 album by alternative comedian Neil Hamburger. It was a limited release by Million Dollar Performances and was sold exclusively during Neil Hamburger's 2000 tour.

== Track listing ==
| No. | Title | Length |
|---|---|---|
| 1. | "Alabama" | 0:32 |
| 2. | "Alaska" | 0:20 |
| 3. | "Arizona" | 1:10 |
| 4. | "Arkansas" | 0:34 |
| 5. | "California" | 0:28 |
| 6. | "Colorado" | 0:19 |
| 7. | "Connecticut" | 0:22 |
| 8. | "Delaware" | 0:18 |
| 9. | "Florida" | 0:46 |
| 10. | "Georgia" | 0:56 |
| 11. | "Hawaii" | 0:18 |
| 12. | "Idaho" | 0:18 |
| 13. | "Illinois" | 0:21 |
| 14. | "Indiana" | 0:20 |
| 15. | "Iowa" | 0:35 |
| 16. | "Kansas" | 0:45 |
| 17. | "Kentucky" | 0:16 |
| 18. | "Louisiana" | 0:20 |
| 19. | "Maine" | 0:23 |
| 20. | "Maryland" | 0:38 |
| 21. | "Massachusetts" | 0:22 |
| 22. | "Michigan" | 0:25 |
| 23. | "Minnesota" | 0:19 |
| 24. | "Mississippi" | 0:44 |
| 25. | "Missouri" | 0:49 |
| 26. | "Montana" | 0:28 |
| 27. | "Nebraska" | 1:08 |
| 28. | "Nevada" | 1:42 |
| 29. | "New Hampshire" | 0:38 |
| 30. | "New Jersey" | 0:39 |
| 31. | "New Mexico" | 0:52 |
| 32. | "New York" | 0:15 |
| 33. | "North Carolina" | 0:15 |
| 34. | "North Dakota" | 0:41 |
| 35. | "Ohio" | 0:17 |
| 36. | "Oklahoma" | 0:27 |
| 37. | "Oregon" | 0:15 |
| 38. | "Pennsylvania" | 0:30 |
| 39. | "Rhode Island" | 0:11 |
| 40. | "South Carolina" | 0:09 |
| 41. | "South Dakota" | 0:46 |
| 42. | "Tennessee" | 0:57 |
| 43. | "Texas" | 0:24 |
| 44. | "Utah" | 0:18 |
| 45. | "Vermont" | 0:22 |
| 46. | "Virginia" | 0:28 |
| 47. | "Washington" | 0:59 |
| 48. | "West Virginia" | 0:16 |
| 49. | "Wisconsin" | 0:24 |
| 50. | "Wyoming" | 1:04 |
