= Robert Dunn (surgeon) =

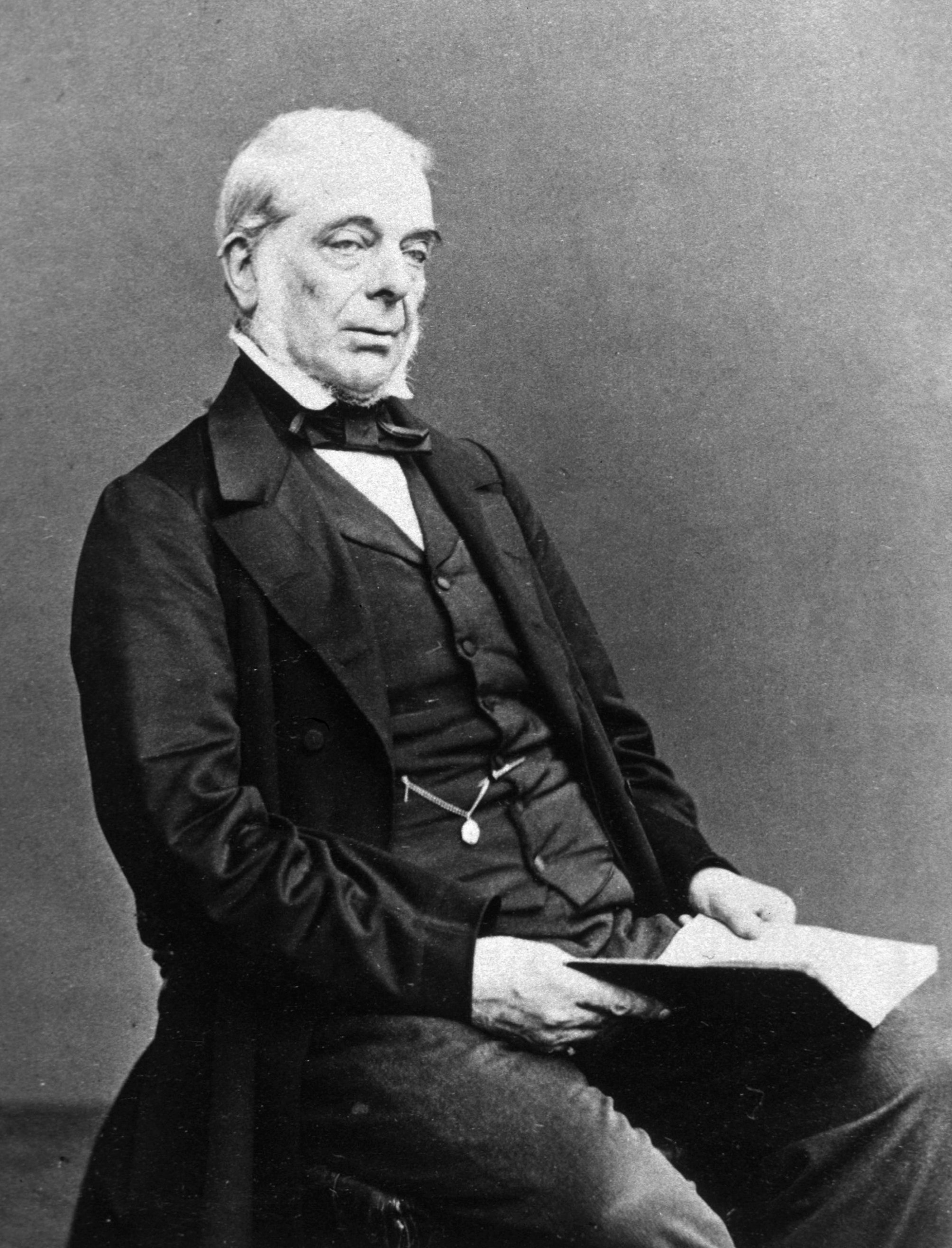
- Born: 1799
- Died: 1877 (aged 77–78)

Robert Dunn (1799 – 4 November 1877) was a British surgeon.

== Life ==
He studied at Guy's and St. Thomas's Hospitals, and became licentiate of the Society of Apothecaries in 1825, member of the Royal College of Surgeons in 1828, and fellow in 1852.

Dunn was a phrenologist and associated at the Westminster Medical Society with others (John S. Streeter, Forbes Winslow and Edward Wright). He was Fellow of the Royal Medical and Chirurgical Society, along with the phrenologists Thomas Ignatius Maria Forster and Joseph Moore. He was also Fellow of the Obstetrical Society, the Ethnological Society of London, and of the Medical Society of London; and was for many years treasurer to the metropolitan counties branch of the British Medical Association. He practised in London, and died 4 November 1877.

== Writings ==
His writings are:

1. A Case of Hemiplegia, 1850 (reprinted from The Lancet);
2. An Essay on Physiological Psychology, 1858 (a reprint of contributions to the Journal of Psychological Medicine);
3. Medical Psychology, 1863 (reprinted from the British Medical Journal);
4. Civilisation and Cerebral Development, in Transactions of the Ethnological Society, 1865;
5. Ethnic Psychology, in the Journal of the Anthropological Institution, 1874;
6. Phenomena of Life and Mind, in the Journal of Mental Science, 1868;
7. Loss of Speech, in the British Medical Journal, 1868.

Dunn was one of those proposing theories of social evolution. According to Leslie Hearnshaw, he belonged to the loose school of psychology around W. B. Carpenter. The work Civilisation and Cerebral Development has been discussed as a representative example of the progression of the period from craniometry to conclusions on race. Dunn argued for an environmentalist monogenism.
