= Left for Dead in Malaysia =

Studio album by Neil Hamburger
- Released: January 25, 1999
- Recorded: July 22, 1998
- Genre: Comedy
- Length: 39:31
- Label: Drag City
- Producer: Neil Hamburger

Neil Hamburger chronology
Raw Hamburger (1998)	Left for Dead in Malaysia (1999)	Inside Neil Hamburger (2000)

Professional ratings
Review scores
Source	Rating
AllMusic	3/5 stars
Pitchfork Media	6.5/10

Left for Dead in Malaysia is an album by the alternative comedian Neil Hamburger. It was recorded at hotels in Kuala Lumpur, Malaysia, and released by Drag City in 1999.

== Critical reception ==
The A.V. Club wrote: "Like Hamburger's first two albums, Left For Dead mercilessly exposes, exaggerates, and satirizes the unnatural, formalized conventions of stand-up comedy: the forced joviality, the manufactured intimacy, the contrived nature of joke-telling, and the sort of theatrical masochism of an art form that requires its participants to confess their failures as human beings, then derive humor from their own shortcomings."

== Track listing ==
1. "Introduction" (1:19)
2. "Selamat Malam" (0:48)
3. "Spice Girls" (0:27)
4. "Transcending the Language Barrier" (2:53)
5. "The Cola Wars" (1:02)
6. "Murphy's Law" (0:52)
7. "Sales Reps' Conventions" (1:52)
8. "Swingers' Parties" (1:58)
9. "Necrophilia" (0:19)
10. "Divorce" (2:59)
11. "Dentists" (1:47)
12. "Come and Visit" (0:58)
13. "Cremation" (1:05)
14. "Kenny Rogers" (0:56)
15. "Colonel Sanders" (0:37)
16. "Neil' Will" (0:54)
17. "Other Comedians" (0:54)
18. "Dating" (0:25)
19. "Inspirtation" (0:59)
20. "A.A." (1:30)
21. "Montezuma's Revenge" (2:44)
22. "Music" (2:01)
23. "Religious Humor" (2:37)
24. "Metric System/Oriental Massage" (1:11)
25. "Lotto Numbers" (2:17)
26. "Just Checking" (0:28)
27. "Antarctica/New Jokes" (1:55)
28. "Changing Times" (1:44)
