= Neil Hamburger Sings Country Winners =

Studio album by Neil Hamburger
- Released: April 21, 2008
- Genre: Comedy, country
- Length: 35:38
- Label: Drag City
- Producer: Neil Hamburger

Neil Hamburger chronology
Hot February Night (2007)	Neil Hamburger Sings Country Winners (2008)	Live At Third Man (2012)

Professional ratings
Review scores
Source	Rating
Allmusic	4/5 stars
Tiny Mix Tapes	3/5 stars

Neil Hamburger Sings Country Winners is the 2008 album by alternative comedian Neil Hamburger. It was released by Drag City on April 21, 2008.

== Track listing ==
1. "Three Piece Chicken Dinner" (2:38)
2. "The Recycle Bin" (3:21)
3. "Please Ask That Clown to Stop Crying" (4:43)
4. "Jug Town" (3:08)
5. "How Can I Still Be Patriotic (When They've Taken Away My Right to Cry)" (4:32)
6. "At Least I Was Paid" (3:11)
7. "Thinkin' It Over" (3:06)
8. "Garden Party II" (3:01)
9. "Zipper Lips Rides Again" (2:06)
10. "The Hula Maiden" (Mark Eitzel cover) (5:52)
