= Inside Neil Hamburger =

EP by Neil Hamburger
- Released: June 26, 2000
- Genre: Comedy
- Length: 13:55
- Label: Drag City
- Producer: Neil Hamburger

Neil Hamburger chronology
Left for Dead in Malaysia (1999)	Inside Neil Hamburger (2000)	50 States, 50 Laughs (2000)

Professional ratings
Review scores
Source	Rating
Allmusic	3/5 stars

Inside Neil hamburger is a 2000 EP by alternative comedian Neil Hamburger. It released by Drag City on June 26, 2000.

== Track listing ==
1. "Interview Snippet" (0:16)
2. "International Funnyman" (6:31)
3. "Inspirational Speaker" (0:37)
4. "Why Did the Cow Feel Inadequate?" (6:31)
