= The Builder (film) =

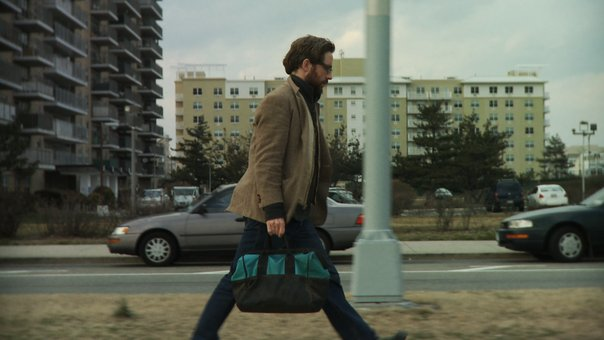
- Colm O'Leary in The Builder
- Directed by: Rick Alverson
- Screenplay by: Rick Alverson, Colm O'Leary
- Produced by: Rick Alverson, Courtney Bowles
- Starring: Colm O'Leary, Liza Kate
- Cinematography: Rick Alverson
- Music by: Gregor Samsa, Spokane, and Bon Iver
- Release date: July 2010

The Builder is a 2010 feature film directed by Rick Alverson. The film features actor Colm O'Leary (New Jerusalem) in his debut performance as an Irish immigrant struggling to reconcile the American ideal and its manifestation in the real world. It was the first feature film released by the independent music label Jagjaguwar.
