= Blood Orgy of the Leather Girls =

1988 film

- Directed by: Meredith Lucas
- Written by: Sarah Dicken, Meredith Lucas
- Produced by: Henry S. Rosenthal and Jon Jost
- Starring: Robin Gingold, Jo Ann Wyman, Dale Soules
- Music by: various
- Release date: 1988
- Country: United States / Canada
- Language: English

Blood Orgy of the Leather Girls is a 1988 horror film directed by Meredith Lucas (a pseudonym — see below) and starring Robin Gingold, Jo Ann Wyman, and Dale Soules. The film is a gory, low-budget, independent B movie made in the classic "sexploitation" style. The film focuses on the efforts of four very different women looking for revenge on men who have mistreated them.

== Plot ==
The film is narrated by a detective, Joe Morton, who has "been working for the Greater Planceville Police Department for 30 years".

We are introduced to the main characters in the film as they prepare for school one morning. Sarah, the leader of the gang, is an Adolf Hitler-idolizing, Iron Cross wearing, society- and life-hating Jewish teenager. Rawhide, naïve and innocent, admires John Wayne. Fleabrain is a strong and dopey girl. Dorothea is the fourth member.

The girls drink alcohol, briefly visit and then cut from their classes at the St. Jerome's School for Girls, terrorize a series of men in the town, and return to the school for an "afternoon tea dance." The band performing at the dance is David Nudelman and the Wild Breed. At the dance, Dorothea is found collapsed on the floor, and the remaining three girls spend the rest of the film hunting down and exacting their revenge on the perpetrators.

== Production ==
Blood Orgy of the Leather Girls was filmed during the 1980s in California, where the Lucases and David Nudelman lived.

The given story for the film is as follows. The production was plagued with difficulties and debt. Director Meredith Lucas was unable to find distribution for the film and, having no way to reconcile her debts, committed suicide. Her brother, Michael A. Lucas, eventually was able to distribute the film in 1988. He wrote on the back of the box, "This belated release is humbly dedicated to her memory." A DVD of the film with multiple commentary tracks and a short film by Michael Lucas, Go Baby Go or Go to Hell, was released by SOV Horror in 2020.

However, in 2010, actor and crew member David Steiner revealed in an interview that Meredith Lucas never existed. She was a fictional creation of Michael Lucas, who actually directed the film himself. Michael Lucas himself confirmed this in his own interview.

== Soundtrack ==
An official soundtrack is available on San Francisco record label Planet Pimp Records. The back cover of the album features a eulogy from Michael A. Lucas to his sister, Meredith.

Note that the contents of the official soundtrack differ greatly from the songs found in the actual film.

== Critical reception ==
One review calls it "relentlessly sardonic". Another rates it as "more serious than its mock title implies". A third calls it "a masterwork of backyard filmmaking." On the Bleeding Skull website, Annie Choi wrote, "It is a pastiche of different images and moods—experimental, but still narrative. It’s dirt cheap, ambitious, provocative, and magnetic"; after it was revealed that the movie was directed by Michael Lucas, Choi updated her review by adding, "As a man directing this movie, he would have been just another guy shooting gratuitous nudity and sexual violence. As a woman, his movie would have been taken out of that context... Questions of authenticity aside, the movie is great. It is still ambitious; it still has something to say. It still explores the smoggy area where feminism and exploitation converge." The University at Buffalo (SUNY Buffalo) includes the film in the movie listing section of its "Women and Society" internet project.
