= The Phantom Surfers =

- Origin: San Francisco, California, United States
- Genres: Surf Instrumentals; Garage punk
- Years active: 1988 - present
- Labels: Hi-Tide; Lookout; Estrus; Norton Records; Planet Pimp; Time Bomb; Zombie A Go-Go
- Website: Official website

The Phantom Surfers are a surf rock band formed in 1988 known for spearheading the instrumental surf-guitar revival of the 1990s with their authentic yet irreverent re-creations of high energy Sixties-era surf music.

Dave Crider of Estrus Records, who put out their first EP, said of the Phantom Surfers, "They've opened people's attitudes toward instrumental music, and that hasn't happened in a long, long time."

Recalling their early performances, bassist Michael Lucas stated, "Before Pulp Fiction, we were just surprised that anybody liked us without having an idea of the tradition that we were abusing... I mean... working in. 'You guys are good, but how come your songs don't have any lyrics?' was a not infrequent question."

Assessing the surf music boom that followed in their wake, Lucas said, "It's great to see that so many surf bands formed, and that people are into surf music. The problem is when they lose sight of the fact that surf is a subset of rock 'n' roll. The same dangers of show-off musicianship, pseudo-intellectualism, and other forms of self-indulgent lameness that made rock go comatose in the late '60s are still primary hazards."

The distinctive, all-encompassing aesthetic of the Phantom Surfers compared to other "surf revival" bands was stated by guitarist Johnny Bartlett as, "A lot of surf bands got it so wrong. It's not just the guitar you use, or the sound you get, or the clothes you wear...it's the whole package."

They have toured five continents, released eight LPs, done two split albums (both with bands from Argentina, Los Tormentos and the Beachbreakers), and recorded with Davie Allen, Dick Dale, Clarence "Blowfly" Reid, Rudy Ray Moore ("Dolemite"), and Neil Hamburger.

Their recordings are generally considered "lo fi," whether recorded on 4 track in an industrial space or in 32 track studios, and the production choices invoke divisive opinions online on forums such as SurfGuitar 101, but there seems to be a strong consensus that their live shows are "wild." Artist Frank Kozik, who featured posters he had done for the Phantom Surfers in his book Man's Ruin: The Posters & Art of Frank Kozik, wrote that they were "an amazing live band."

They are known for their self-deprecating sense of humor and "steadfastly refusing to 'make it' in music, despite occasional overtures from the industry," qualities displayed in their 2010 book Rock Stardom for Dumbshits, of which the SF Weekly wrote, "If some truths can only be told in jest, then Rock Stardom for Dumbshits is hilarious to the point of painful, if only because it's an all-too-accurate account of the nature of the music business and the stupidity that it breeds at every level.

Their music has appeared in the films Blood Orgy of the Leather Girls (1988) and The Return of the Great God Pan (2024).

As of 2025, the Phantom Surfers were still performing live, doing their eighth Japanese tour as well as performing at the Tiki Oasis and Surf Guitar 101 festivals.

An eleventh album, The Phantom Surfers Play the Great Titles, is scheduled for release on Hi-Tide Recordings in late 2026, featuring original songs that use "great titles" associated with other, unrelated, works such as "Cruel Summer," "Highway to Hell," and "Death of a Salesman."

== Members ==
=== Current (latest album) ===
- "Swell" Mel Bergman: guitar
- Mike "Mouth" Lucas: bass
- Maz "Spazz" Kattuah: guitar
- Russell "Junky Johnny" Quan: drums
- Johnny "Big Hand" Bartlett: guitar

=== Previous ===
- Johnny "Big Hand" Bartlett: guitar
- Mel "Frostbite" Bergman: guitar
- Michael "Daddy Love" Lucas: bass
- Maz "Tender Pants"/"Good Knievel" Kattuah: drums
- Trent Ruane: rhythm guitar and organ on Big-Screen Spectaculars LP
- Fred again

=== First ===
- Johnny "Big Hand" Bartlett: guitar
- Mel "Frostbite" Bergman: guitar
- Michael "Daddy Love" Lucas: bass
- Danny Seelig: drums

== Discography ==
=== Albums ===
==== Eighteen Deadly Ones! LP ====
(Norton Records, 1992)

1. Pleasure Point
2. 20,000 Leagues Under the Surf
3. San Onofre
4. Horror Beach
5. Monster From The Surf
6. Sewer Peak
7. Surfin' With The Vy
8. Legend Of The Phantom Surfer
9. Wave Hog
10. Palincar
11. Sandtrap Stomp
12. Slots O'Fun
13. Stiletto
14. 14 Miles To Gotham
15. Theme From Dead West
16. Twist Off
17. Jalama Burger
18. Banzai Run

==== Phantom Surfers Play The Songs Of The Big-Screen Spectaculars LP ====
(Estrus, 1992)

1. Bikini Drag
2. Pursuit of the Leather Girls
3. Geronimo
4. L'Ultima Volta
5. Hush, Hush Sweet Charlotte
6. Batwoman vs. Ratfink
7. High Wall
8. Bali Hai
9. Big Screen Spectacular Tonight
10. Eaffin' and Surfin'
11. Gammera
12. The Beach Girls and The Monster
13. Suffer
14. Popcorn

==== The Exciting Sounds Of Model Road Racing LP ====
(Lookout! Records, 1995. Re-edited in 1998)

1. Introduction
2. Everybody Up
3. Death O A Rookie
4. Schlock Slot
5. Slotter On 10th Avenue
6. Crossover Tragedy
7. Rheostat Rock
8. Pacific Shores
9. A Slot Car Named Desire
10. Turn Marshal
11. Stumps Of Mystery
12. Endurance Rally
13. Final Lap
14. "Church Key"

==== ...And Dick Dale LP ====
(Crown Records, 1996)

1. Stop That Cedric
2. Tell Tale Couch
3. Rochambeau
4. Tic-Toc Rock
5. Battle of Little Big Hand
6. Skirfir
7. Fairest of Them All
8. Wow!
9. The Lonely Mattress
10. Gas Chamber
11. Try To Hide Me
12. Pretty Little Lisa
13. Sloth in
14. We'll Never Hear The End of It

==== The Great Surf Crash Of '97 LP ====
(Lookout! Records, 1997)

1. The Great Surf Crash Of '97
2. Rootin' Around For Ramona
3. Pygmy Dance
4. Basset Ballet
5. Single Whammy
6. The Cat Came Back
7. Ticker Tape jungle
8. Medley X-Files / Stupid Files
9. Ants In My Pants
10. (I Call My Baby) D.D.T.
11. Holiday Harbor
12. Babalou
13. Buy High, Sell Low
14. Yozora No Hoshi
15. Out The Window
16. No Go Diggy-Di
17. Lancelot Link Wray

==== Skaterhater LP, featuring Davie Allan ====
(Lookout! Records, 1998)

1. Curb Job (Skaterhater Overture)
2. Sidewalk City
3. Devil Dust
4. Sheena Was A Punk Rocker
5. You Meet The Nicest People On A Harley
6. Supercycle (Love Theme From Skaterhater)
7. The End Of A Skater
8. Blues Theme (Vocal)
9. Grindhouse
10. (The Sound Of) Breaking Glass
11. Arrow Space
12. Skate And Bait
13. Murder Can Be Fun
14. Polyurethane
15. Drag Run

==== XXX Party LP ====
(Lookout! Records, 2000)

1. I Know It When I Hear It
2. Dick Hickeys
3. The Pioneers/Have A Good Funeral/Yellow Neck Will Pay
4. The Golden Turd
5. Nantucket Sleigh Ride
6. Necro Sue
7. The Crepitation Contest
8. Tomato Juice
9. The Big Dick Club
10. Peach Pousaye
11. Dolemite's Corner
12. Happiness Is...
13. The Phantom Surfers' Alphabet
14. Business Deal
15. Love Is...
16. A Funny Thing Happened To Me On The Way To The Orgy
17. Sin In The Suburbs
18. Special Guest Guffaws (featuring America's Funnyman Neil Hamburger)
19. Let's Fist Again
20. Summa Pornographica

==== A Decade Of Quality Control 1988-1999 ====
(V8 Records/Secret Recipe, 2000. Contains written history of the band)

1. Phantom Surfers Quality Statement
2. The Hearse/ El Aguila
3. Paradise Cove
4. Skating Red Square
5. Six Pack
6. Gypsy Surfer
7. Lafayette
8. Klingons Vs. Daleks
9. Surfari
10. Move It
11. Besame Mucho
12. Playa Raton
13. Flutterfoot
14. Shaving Cream
15. Poison Clam
16. Tie Me Kangaroo Down

=== EPs ===
- Orbitron 7" (Estrus, 1991)

==== Singles ====
- Besame Mucho 7" (Standard Recordings, 1991)
- Unknown Museum Stomp 7" (Sympathy For The Record Industry, 1992)
- Bikini Drag 7" (Estrus, 1992)
- Flutter Foot 7" (Drop-Out, 1993)
- Survival Of The Fattest 7" (Planet Pimp Records, 1995)
- Istanbul 7" (Lookout! Records, 1996)
- Banzai Washout 7" (Estrus)

==== Splits ====
- Northwest Budget Rock Massacre 7" (The Phantom Surfers / Mummies)(Pre B.S. Records, 1991)
- Hell-Beach Party 7" (The Phantom Surfers / The Roofdogs)(Demolition Records, 1992)
- Rocket To Surfin' Europe Tour 1994 7" (The Phantom Surfers / The Astronauts) (Pin Up Records, 1994)
- Go! (The Phantom Surfers / The Tormentos) (Scatter/Lost Tiki, 2003)
- Parrillada con Amigos (The Phantom Surfers / The Beach Breakers) (ATMC Records, 2012)

==== Compilations ====
- The Estrus Half-Rack 3x7"-box (Estrus, 3 7"-box1991)
- The Estrus Half-Rack (Estrus, 1991)
- Ultra Punch Deluxe 7" (Cruddy Records, 1993)
- Turban Renewal: A Tribute to Sam the Sham & The Pharaohs (Norton Records, 2 LPs 1994)
- Locked In To Surf & Rock 'n Roll Instrumentals (LP: Alopecia! Records, 1994; CD:Alopecia! Records, 1995)
- Heide Sez (Lookout! Records, 1996)
- You're Only As Good As the Last Thing You Did (Lookout! Records, 1997)
- Forward Till Death (Lookout! Records, 1999)
- The Necessary Effect, Screamers Songs Interpreted (Extravertigo Recordings/Xeroid Records, 2 CDs, 2003)
- Instro-Mental Mania (AlphaMonic, 2004)
- Fuck You Spaceman! 7" (Planet Pimp Records, 2004)
- Everybody's Surfing/Nobody's Surfing LP (Repent Records)
- Blood Orgy of the Leather Girls Soundtrack LP (Planet Pimp Records)
- Cowabunga! The Box Set (Rhino Records/Rhino Song Banzai Run, 4 CDs)
