= Rick Alverson =

American film director

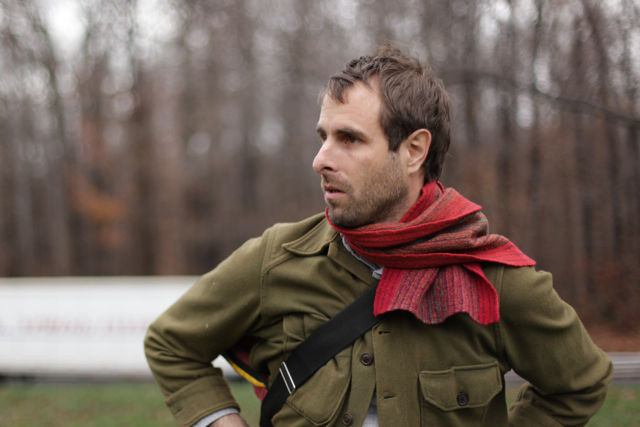
- Alverson in 2011
- Born: Patrick James Alverson Jr. June 25, 1971 (age 54); Spokane, Washington, U.S.
- Occupations: Filmmaker, musician
- Years active: 1996–present
- Website: madebedproductions.com

Patrick James Alverson Jr. (born June 25, 1971) is an American film director, screenwriter and musician, living in Richmond, Virginia. His films have been characterized by their confrontational nature and unconventional dramatic structure.

== Career ==
=== Films ===
Alverson's first films were considered in the neorealist tradition because of their use of non-actors and unscripted dialogue, as well as their immigrant, working-class subject matter. His first, The Builder (2010), featured co-writer Colm O'Leary in his debut performance as an Irish immigrant struggling to reconcile the American ideal and its manifestation in the real world. Premiering at Rotterdam Film Festival, New Jerusalem (2011), his second feature, starring Colm O'Leary and Will Oldham, again considered the immigrant experience, this time through the lens of religious ideology.

The Comedy (2012), a departure from the subtle form and subject matter of Alverson's previous films, starred cult-comic Tim Heidecker in his first dramatic role. The film's subject matter and refusal to cast moral judgment on its characters were considered controversial. It examined the flawed idea of an attainable American utopia, a concept recurrent throughout Alverson's work. Heidecker played Swanson, an upper-class, white male confrontationally attempting to define the limitations of the world around him. The third film to be executive produced and funded by the independent record label Jagjaguwar, The Comedy premiered in U.S. dramatic competition at the 2012 Sundance Film Festival.

His fourth feature, Entertainment (2015), starring Gregg Turkington, also cast comedic actors in a dramatic context, exploring the relationship between viewership and performance. Both formally and visually his most ambitious to date, the film garnered high praise from critics upon its U.S. premiere at Sundance. It premiered in international competition at the Locarno Film Festival. The Guardian called it “a road trip to the center of a harrowing abyss.” Magnolia Pictures released Entertainment in November 2015 to further critical praise.

In 2017, Alverson directed and edited a short film entitled William Eggleston: Musik in support of the photographer's first collection of musical compositions.

Alverson's fifth feature, The Mountain (2018), premiered in competition at the 75th Venice International Film Festival. Set in early 1950s America, the film stars Tye Sheridan, Jeff Goldblum, Hannah Gross, Udo Kier and Denis Lavant and is loosely based on the American neurologist Walter Freeman's fall from grace after the procedure he invented, the lobotomy, came under scrutiny. Referring to the film as "anti-utopian", Alverson has described it as a "counterweight" to the American "narrative of unlimited potential and boundless opportunity" in favor of an emphasis on the value of limitations.

Alverson's frequent collaborators include Colm O'Leary, Tim Heidecker, Gregg Turkington, and Tye Sheridan.

=== Videos ===
Alverson has directed music videos for Sharon Van Etten, Angel Olsen, Bonnie 'Prince' Billy, Benjamin Booker, Strand of Oaks, Night Beds, Gregor Samsa and Oneohtrix Point Never.

=== Music ===
In addition to his directorial work he has released 10 records, most recently with his band Lean Year in 2017. Alverson was the brains behind his previous band Spokane.

== Filmography ==
| Year | Title | Director | Writer | Producer | Editor | Other | Notes |
|---|---|---|---|---|---|---|---|
| 2010 | The Builder | Yes | Yes | Yes | Yes | Yes | Also cinematographer |
| 2011 | New Jerusalem | Yes | Yes | Yes | Yes | Yes | Also cinematographer |
| 2012 | The Comedy | Yes | Yes | Yes | Yes | | |
| 2015 | Entertainment | Yes | Yes | Yes | Yes | | |
| 2017 | William Eggleston: Musik | Yes | | Yes | Yes | | Short film |
| 2018 | The Mountain | Yes | Yes | Yes | Yes | | |

== Discography ==
=== Lean Year ===
- Lean Year | Western Vinyl (2017)
- Sides | Western Vinyl (2022)

=== Spokane ===
- Leisure and Other Songs | Jagjaguwar (2000)
- Proud Graduates | Jagjaguwar (2001)
- Close Quarters | Acuarela (2001)
- Able Bodies | Jagjaguwar (2003)
- Measurement | Jagjaguwar (2005)
- Little Hours | Jagjaguwar (2007)
