= Virgil Shaw =

American singer-songwriter

Virgil Shaw is an American singer-songwriter based in San Francisco. Shaw spent his early life in Fairfax, California. He released two country rock albums in the early 2000s, Quad Cities and Still Falling.

== Early career ==
He began his career in Arcata, California in the late 1980s as a member of the high energy speed-pop band Brent's T.V. He later moved to San Francisco where he played in the band Dieselhed from 1992 to 2000. When Dieselhed disbanded in 2000, Shaw began to perform and record as a solo artist, sometimes with the help of his backing band that he named "The Killer Views". After a stint in New York City, in 2006, he moved to Portland, Oregon.

== Recording albums ==
Shaw's first album, Quad Cities, was released in 2000 through Future Farmer Records. In reviewing the album, AllMusic's Kieran McCarthy described Shaw as an "heir apparent to country-rock founder Gram Parsons", and awarded the album 4 out of 5 stars. According to AllMusic's Stanton Swihart, Quad Cities is "loaded with amazingly rich, evocative songwriting". Shaw's second album, Still Falling, was released in 2002 through Munich Records. Swihart wrote of this album that "'[s]tunning' seems to be the word that has most attached itself to Still Falling, and with excellent reason", and awarded it 4.5 out of 5 stars.

== Associated acts ==
- Brent's T.V.
- Dieselhed
- Virgil Shaw and The Killer Views
