= America's Funnyman =

Studio album by Neil Hamburger
- Released: September 2, 1996
- Recorded: February – March 1996
- Genre: Comedy
- Length: 34:16
- Label: Drag City
- Producer: Neil Hamburger

Neil Hamburger chronology
Great Phone Calls Featuring Neil Hamburger (1992)	America's Funnyman (1996)	Neil Hamburger Pays Tribute to Diana, Princess of Wales (1997)

Professional ratings
Review scores
Source	Rating
AllMusic	4/5 stars

America's Funnyman is a 1996 album by alternative comedian Neil Hamburger. It was released by Drag City on September 2, 1996.

== Track listing ==
All tracks written by Neil Hamburger

1. "America's Funnyman" – 0:54
2. "The Diagnosis" – 0:48
3. "A Moment of Silence" – 0:23
4. "Factory Outlet Malls" – 0:12
5. "Menswear" – 0:04
6. "Gourmet Chocolate" – 0:01
7. "Women's Lingerie" – 0:30
8. "Doctors" – 0:25
9. "The Army Reserve" – 0:58
10. "Divorce" – 0:45
11. "Anniversarys" – 0:24
12. "Warehouse Shopping" – 0:39
13. "Lawsuit Crazy" – 0:28
14. "Single Life" – 0:04
15. "Condoms" – 2:06
16. "Smoking" – 0:15
17. "Gusty Winds" – 0:24
18. "The Audience" – 0:26
19. "Bigotry" – 0:48
20. "AandR People" – 0:21
21. "The Ex-Wife" – 0:27
22. "Talk Show Hosts" – 0:25
23. "Motels" – 0:25
24. "The Zipper Shtick" – 0:39
25. "The Top Ten - Censored!" – 1:00
26. "O.J." – 2:03
27. "Bill and Hillary" – 0:22
28. "Newt Gingrich" – 0:04
29. "Celebrity Liver Transplants" – 0:06
30. "Flashers" – 0:40
31. "Cop Shows" – 0:57
32. "Lawyers" – 0:50
33. "The Most Annoying Thing" – 1:17
34. "The Speed Limit" – 0:12
35. "G-Strings" – 0:20
36. "Divorce" – 0:17
37. "Rich Little Tribute" – 1:01
38. "The Battle Between the Sexes" – 2:13
39. "The X-Rated Hot Dog Vendor" – 4:57
40. "Gambling" – 1:43
41. "Dating" – 0:31
42. "Suicide" – 1:08
43. "Restaurants" – 0:47
44. "Motels" – 1:01
