= Laugh Out Lord =

Studio album by Neil Hamburger
- Released: November 5, 2002
- Recorded: 2002
- Genre: Comedy
- Length: 43:59
- Label: Drag City/Glory Home Records
- Producer: Neil Hamburger

Neil Hamburger chronology
50 States, 50 Laughs (2000)	Laugh Out Lord (2002)	Great Moments at Di Presa's Pizza House (2005)

Professional ratings
Review scores
Source	Rating
Allmusic	3.5/5 stars

Laugh Out Lord is a 2002 album by alternative comedian Neil Hamburger. It was released jointly by Drag City and Glory Home Records on November 5, 2002.

In 2009 the album was named by The A.V. Club as one of the "best comedy albums of the decade".

== Track listing ==
1. "Tribute To The Greats" (1:43)
2. "Seven Elevens" (3:19)
3. "The Ocean Blue" (0:38)
4. "Disgracing The Hamburger Family Name" (0:38)
5. "Live At Caesar's Palace in Las Vegas" (0:11)
6. "Tom Thumb Mini-Storage" (0:08)
7. "My Daughter" (1:09)
8. "There'd Be A Popular Uprising!" (0:19)
9. "A Diagnosis Made Offhand" (0:09)
10. "Waiter, I Didn't Touch That Woman's Ass!" (0:24)
11. "500 of 'Em" (0:52)
12. "Look What Happened" (0:31)
13. "The Wizard" (0:52)
14. "Condoms 2002" (0:21)
15. "Death" (0:24)
16. "Dollars" (0:42)
17. "Puerto Rico" (0:54)
18. "Just Poking Fun" (1:02)
19. "Detergent II" (0:34)
20. "Popular Movies" (0:18)
21. "Popular Music" (0:35)
22. "Aromatherapy" (0:23)
23. "Management" (0:57)
24. "Dying" (0:42)
25. "Drag City Records" (1:43)
26. "Almost Startling, Really!" (0:18)
27. "He Wasn't One" (0:35)
28. "Shoulder Trouble" (0:05)
29. "Falling Merchandise" (0:19)
30. "The New Album" (0:05)
31. "A Timeless Political Routine" (1:52)
32. "Divorce" (0:12)
33. "The Deluxe Treatment" (0:25)
34. "Lawyers Advised Against Titling This Track" (0:23)
35. "Technical Problems" (0:26)
36. "The Zipper Lips" (3:28)
37. "Troubled Times" (1:14)
38. "Triumph In Kabul" (0:21)
39. "Our President" (2:00)
40. "Laugh Out Lord" (12:49)
