= Planet Pimp Records =

Inactive record label

Sven-Erik Geddes' business card for Planet Pimp Records

Planet Pimp Records was a 1990s San Francisco-based independent record label that released various bands from the local garage rock scene, as well as comedy and prank records. In 2019 the website Splice Today dubbed Planet Pimp Records "the most insane prank ever to masquerade as a record label."

Plant Pimp Records released mostly vinyl 7" records, but did issue a couple of vinyl 12" albums, a couple of vinyl 12" compilations, and couple of CD albums. Some of the bands on the Planet Pimp roster were: The Mummies, The Trashwomen, The Go-Nuts, Crime, The 5.6.7.8's, The Phantom Surfers, and comedian Neil Hamburger, among others. The first Planet Pimp release, 1991's Fuck You Spaceman! was a 7" mini-compilation featuring The Mummies, The Phantom Surfers, and other artists. The label was owned and represented by Sven-Erik Geddes, who dressed in a chicken costume for promotional photographs as "Baron Von Rooster, Merchandizing Chicken."

Planet Pimp Records was notable for helping to launch the career of comedian Neil Hamburger (Greg Turkington), some of whose earliest recordings as the Neil Hamburger character were issued as 7" singles on the label. Apart from music and comedy, Planet Pimp released three novelty field recording 7" singles under the imprimatur of a fake organization called The Golding Institute: Sounds of the American Fast Food Restaurants (1996), Sounds of the San Francisco Adult Bookstores (1998), and Sounds of the International Airport Restrooms (1998). The "Sounds of" releases were masterminded by Turkington, with assistance from Geddes.

Planet Pimp was also notable for releasing early recordings from Japanese all-girl garage rock bands such as The 5.6.7.8's and The Pebbles. The label also released the vinyl LP soundtrack to the Meredith Lucas (Mike Lucas) film, Blood Orgy of the Leather Girls.

Planet Pimp Records' last release was issued in 1998. On March 7, 2025, the New Jersey radio station WFMU paid homage to Planet Pimp Records on The Hour of Crap program with Don-O.
