= Amarillo Records =

American independent record label

Amarillo Records was an independent record label owned by Gregg Turkington that operated out of San Francisco, California, from 1992 to 2001. The label specialized in releasing experimental rock music and comedy records. It released several solo recordings by Church of Satan founder Anton LaVey, as well as the 1996 sampler compilation You Gan't Boar Like an Eabla When You Work with Turkrys.

== Artists on Amarillo Records ==
A list of bands, artists and others whose music, spoken word and comedy released through Amarillo Records.

- Anton LaVey
- Charles Gocher
- Dieselhed
- Faxed Head
- Harvey Sid Fisher
- Heavenly Ten Stems
- Major Entertainer Mike H
- Neil Hamburger
- New Session People
- Pop-O-Pies
- Secret Chiefs 3
- Sun City Girls
- Therapist John's Zip Code Revue
- Thinking Fellers Union Local 282
- Three Doctors
- Today's Sounds
- Totem Pole Of Losers
- U.S. Saucer
- Zip Code Rapists
- Zip Code Revue

== See also ==
- List of record labels
