= Robert Donne =

American composer and musician (born 1967)

Robert Donne (born 1967) is a musician and film composer from Richmond, Virginia. He has recorded works with a variety of groups and individuals including Labradford (Kranky), Aix Em Klemm (Kranky), Spokane (Jagjaguwar), Gregor Samsa, Cristal (Flingco Sound System, Entr'acte), Pan.American (Kranky), Stephen Vitiello (Geographic North), and most recently Anjou (Kranky). His work as a composer includes The Mountain starring Jeff Goldblum; Rick Alverson's Entertainment, which premiered at the 2015 Sundance Film Festival; and New Jerusalem (2011 Film Festival Rotterdam), as well as Daniel Carbone's Hide Your Smiling Faces (2013 Berlinale).
