= Buck Fever =

Studio album by Estradasphere
- Released: 2001
- Genres: experimental rock; jazz-rock
- Length: 72:24
- Label: Web of Mimicry
- Producer: Tim Smolens

Estradasphere chronology
| The Silent Elk of Yesterday (2001) | Buck Fever (2001) | Quadropus (2003) |

Buck Fever was the second full-length album released by Estradasphere, released in September 2001 by Web of Mimicry. Notable assistance on the album comes from Trey Spruance, of Mr. Bungle and Secret Chiefs 3 fame.

== Track listing ==
1. "Buck Fever" – 5:45
2. "The Dapper Bandits" – 8:03
3. "The Silent Elk of Yesterday" – 6:17
4. "Crag Lake" – 0:48
5. "Meteorite Showers" – 8:14
6. "The Bounty Hunter" – 6:17
7. "Super Buck II" (Cover of Super Mario Bros. 2 overworld theme) – 2:35
8. "Millennium Child" – 8:16
9. "Trampoline Klan" – 2:02
10. "Burnt Corpse" – 0:14
11. "Rise n' Shine (Epic Doobie Nightmare #"1)" – 2:27
12. "Bride of the Buck" – 1:39
13. "A Very Intense Battle" – 8:40
14. "Green Hill" – 1:25
15. "Feed Your Mama's Meter (Remix 2001)" – 4:15
16. "What Deers May Come" – 5:28

== Album credits ==
=== The Band ("The Big Game Hunters") ===
- Timb Harris – solo violin, violin sections, solo and section trumpets, mandolin, euphonium, keyboards.
- David Murray – drums, didjeridu, percussion, (djembe, shaker, tambourine, timpani, roto toms, dombek, orchestral percussion), new age keyboards.
- Jason Schimmel – acoustic and electric guitars, baritone guitar, sitar guitar, banjo, lapsteel, keyboard (organs, piano, glockenspiel, toy piano, choir, chimes, electric pino, clav)
- Tim Smolens – upright bass, hollowbody and electric bass, bowed bass sections, keyboard (synth bass, handclaps, organs, timpani, gong, strings, sound fx, samples, choir, new age sounds, etc.) synth programming, techno loops.
- John Whooley – tenor, alto, baritone and soprano saxophones, flute, vocals, throat singing, percussion (congas, clave, guiro, shaker, tambourine, woodblock, cowbell), accordion, piano, cp-70, electric piano, clav

=== Personnel ("Seasonal Hunters") ===
- Producer: Tim Smolens
- Recording Engineer: Tim Smolens
- Recording Engineer (drums): Justin Phelps, Trey Spruance
- Mastered: Thom Canova with Tim & Timb at Found Sound, San Francisco, California
- Art direction: Butt Bud & Mari Kono
- Graphic Artist: Mari Kono
- Head Goon: Tim
- Photographs: Mari Kono
- Goon Squad: Timb, Jay

=== Dedication ===
Buck Fever was created in memory of Smith Dobson.
