= Perichoresis (album) =

Studio album by Ishraqiyun
- Released: October 21, 2014
- Recorded: 2003 – 2014
- Studio: Various: Coast Recorders; (San Francisco, CA); Forking Paths Studio; (San Francisco, CA); Hyde Street Studios; (San Francisco, CA); Lucky Cat Recording; (San Francisco, CA); Prairie Sun Recording Studios; (Cotati, CA); Toast Studios; (San Francisco, CA)
- Genre: Experimental rock
- Length: 41:25
- Label: Web of Mimicry
- Producer: Trey Spruance

Secret Chiefs 3 chronology
Book of Souls: Folio A (2013)	Perichoresis (2014)	The Book Beri'ah (2018)

Perichoresis is the debut studio album by Ishraqiyun and the eighth studio album by Secret Chiefs 3, released on October 21, 2014 by Web of Mimicry. The album comprises Afghani music influenced original compositions that utilise non-Western tunings and instrumentation which the band had previously performed in over forty countries. It is the second album in the band's discography to feature music entirely created by one of the satellite projects.

== Reception ==
Critic Emmett Palaima gave Perichoresis an indifferent reception, saying "the album has some interesting moments, usually electronic sounds, western melodies, or the occasional guitar solo such as on "Saptarshi", but these often only last for a bar or two before plunging back into a dull microtonal section."

== Track listing ==
All tracks are written by Trey Spruance.

No.	Title	Length
1.	"The 15"	4:11
2.	"The 7"	7:22
3.	"Base Phive Futur-Cossacks"	3:49
4.	"Spiritus Intelligentiae: Jophiel"	4:28
5.	"Perichoresis"	16:48
6.	"Saptarshi"	4:47

== Personnel ==
Adapted from the Perichoresis liner notes.

Ishraqiyun

- Rich Doucette – Esraj (1, 2, 4), sārangī (1, 4)
- Timba Harris – violin (2, 3, 4)
- Danny Heifetz – right channel drums (1)
- Shahzad Ismaily – bass guitar (2)
- Eyvind Kang – viola (1, 2, 4)
- Ches Smith – drums (2, 3, 4, 5), congas (5)
- Trey Spruance – keyboards, production, recording, mastering, illustrations, design, bağlama (1, 2, 4), guitar (3, 5, 6), percussion (3, 5, 6), rabab (1, 2), lyre (1, 5), additional bass (2, 4), synthesizer (3, 5), harp (5), claves (5), celesta (6)

Additional musicians

- Mike Dillon – tabla (1, 2, 4)
- Justin Howell – sitar and tabla (6)
- Jai Young Kim – keyboards (1)
- Peijman Kouretchian – left channel drums (1)
- Matt Lebofsky – piano (3)
- Jason Schimmel – bass guitar (1)
- Danny Shamoun – ney (2)
- Adam Stacey – keyboards (2, 4)

Production and design

- Randall Dunn – recording (2, 3, 4)
- Justin Phelps – recording (6)
- Kurt Schlegel – recording (5)

== Release history ==
Region	Date	Label	Format	Catalog
United States	2014	Web of Mimicry	CD, DL	WOM 050
United States	2015	Web of Mimicry	LP	WOM 050
