= Book of Souls: Folio A =

Studio album by Secret Chiefs 3
- Released: November 19, 2013
- Recorded: 2002 – 2013
- Studio: Various: The Bunker; (Los Angeles, CA); Coast Recorders; (San Francisco, CA); Forking Paths Studio; (San Francisco, CA); Mills College; (Oakland, CA); Hyde Street Studios; (San Francisco, CA); Rusty Shack Studio; Lucky Cat Recording; (San Francisco, CA); Aleph Studios; (Seattle, WA); First Congregational Church; (Santa Cruz, CA); The Chummery; (Seattle, WA); East Side Sound; (New York City, NY)
- Genre: Experimental rock
- Label: Web of Mimicry
- Producer: Trey Spruance

Secret Chiefs 3 chronology
Satellite Supersonic Vol. 1 (2010)	Book of Souls: Folio A (2013)	Perichoresis (2014)

Book of Souls: Folio A is the seventh studio album by Secret Chiefs 3, released on November 19, 2013, by Web of Mimicry.

== Reception ==
The Louisville Eccentric Observer praised the colorful and emotionally stirring nature of the music and said "With Folio A, Secret Chiefs have given us another release that prides itself on intricately composed and eclectic songs delivered with an indifferently divisive attitude." Patrick W. Delaney of mxdwn Music was impressed by the band's artist growth, stating "those nine years spent crafting the music here feel as though they were well spent; even though the smorgasboard of sound that was Book of Horizons is unbelievably impressive, here the different elements feel a little more comfortable sitting next to each other." Music critic Christopher East pointed to the Book of Souls: Folio A's cinematic quality as being its highlight but noted that the album did not match the success of the band's previous releases.

== Track listing ==
All tracks are written by Trey Spruance.

No.	Title	Artist	Length
1.	"Balance of the 19"	Ishraqiyun	4:00
2.	"Nova IHVH"	Secret Chiefs 3	0:20
3.	"Potestas Clavium"	The Electromagnetic Azoth	5:34
4.	"Post-Identity Hour (AMS World Newscorp)"	Secret Chiefs 3	1:58
5.	"Personae: Halloween"	UR	3:47
6.	"Utopian Weekly Update (HVHI Public Access)"	Secret Chiefs 3	0:35
7.	"Scorched Earth Saturnalia: Ballet Miniatures Suite in 4 Elemental Movements"	FORMS	7:03
8.	"Full Spectrum Anamnesis"	Secret Chiefs 3	0:06
9.	"Drive"	UR	4:28
10.	"Barzakh ID Markers (AIO Radio Narcissus)"	Secret Chiefs 3	0:44
11.	"La Chanson De Jacky"	Traditionalists	3:37
12.	"Toy Soldier's Frontline Report (Faust Journal, DodecSMA Corp)"	Secret Chiefs 3	1:15
13.	"Tistrya"	Ishraqiyun	5:42

== Personnel ==
Adapted from the Book of Souls: Folio A liner notes.

Secret Chiefs 3

- Trey Spruance – production, engineering, mixing, illustrations, design, guitar (2–6, 8–13), bass guitar (1, 2, 4, 6, 8, 10–12), synthesizer (1–6, 8, 10, 12, 13), organ (2, 4, 6, 8, 10, 12), noises (2, 3, 4, 6, 8, 10, 12), sampler (2, 4, 6, 8), baritone guitar (3, 5), piano (1, 11), additional percussion (1, 11), bağlama (1), celesta (3), Hammond organ (3), recording (3), arrangements (5), dulcimer (9), Wurlitzer electric piano (9)

Additional musicians

- Archie Carey – bassoon (2–4, 6, 8, 11, 12)
- Claire Chenette – oboe (1, 2, 4, 8, 10–12), English horn (2, 4, 8, 10, 11, 12)
- Elena Doroftei (as Anonymous 13) – viola and vocals (9)
- Toby Driver – bass guitar (13)
- Lori Goldston – cello (7)
- Adrián Terrazas-González – flute (2, 4, 8, 10, 11, 12)
- Kenny Grohowski – drums (2, 4, 12)
- Stephan Haluska – harp (2–4, 7, 8, 10–12)
- Timb Harris – viola (1–4, 7, 8, 10–12). violin (1–4, 7, 8, 10–13), cello (7)
- Danny Heifetz – left channel (1)
- Eyvind Kang – violin (1)
- Fatima Khanoam – santoor (1)
- KT Pierce – vocals (11)
- Shahzad Ismaily – bass guitar (3, 9), percussion (1)
- Steve Moore – trombone (3, 11), celesta (3)
- Dante Pascuzzo – contrabass (2, 4, 8, 10–12)
- Mike Patton – vocals (11), engineering (22)
- Jesse Quattro – vocals (3)
- Jason Schimmel – acoustic guitar (2–4, 6, 8, 10–12), vocals (2, 6, 10), vocals (4, 12), santoor (1), Wah Guitar (1), backing vocals (3), piano (11), engineering (1, 3, 7)
- Danny Shamoun – ney (1, 13)
- Mort Shuman – translation (11)
- Ches Smith – drums (3, 13), right channel (1)
- Tim Smolens – contrabass and engineering (7)
- Adam Stacey – accordion and engineering (3, 11), piano (7)
- Kris Testanier – vocals (7)
- Hans Teuber – flute (7)
- William Winant – percussion (1, 2, 3, 4, 7, 8, 10, 11, 12), snare drum (7, 11), glockenspiel (3, 7), additional percussion (3), cabasa (3), temple blocks (3), tube bells (3), güiro (3), timpani (3), timpani (7), bass drum (7), vibraphone (7), viola (7), vocals (7)
- Moriah Neils – bassoon and contrabass (7)
- Melody Yenn – cello (2, 4, 6, 8, 11, 12)
- Zara Rivera – French horn (9)

Production and design

- Mike Bennewitz (as butcherBaker) – illustrations, design
- Thom Canova – engineering (1, 5)
- Randall Dunn – engineering (3, 7, 9, 11, 13) and synthesizer (13)
- Justin Phelps – engineering (1)
- Kurt Schlegel – engineering and mixing (1, 3, 7)
- Mark Thornton – illustrations, typesetting
- Marc Urselli – engineering and recording (13)

== Release history ==
Region	Date	Label	Format	Catalog
United States	2013	Web of Mimicry	CD	WOM 043
