= It's Understood =

Studio album by Estradasphere
- Released: June 26, 2000
- Recorded: 1999
- Studio: ROHYPONOL_Studios911
- Genre: Experimental metal
- Length: 74:57
- Label: Mimicry
- Producer: Tim Smolens

Estradasphere chronology
It's Understood (2000)	The Silent Elk of Yesterday (2001)

Professional ratings
Review scores
Source	Rating
AllMusic	4/5 stars

It's Understood is the first studio album by the experimental rock band Estradasphere. It was released on Mimicry Records on June 26, 2000.

The first track on the album, "Hunger Strike", sets the tone of Estradasphere's repertoire by covering a wide range of musical genres including klezmer, jazz, bluegrass and heavy metal. At nineteen minutes and thirty seconds in length it is the longest song in the band's discography.

Tracks 6 through 9 are songs that form a four part composition titled "The Princes of Xibalba". Tracks 2 and 11 are not performed as such, but electronically sequenced by Tim Smolens and parody the music from popular video games such as Super Mario Bros. Track 12 was recorded at a violin recital for member Timb Harris. All other tracks were recorded at ROHYPONOL_Studios911 in 1999.

== Track listing ==
No.	Title	Writer(s)	Length
1.	"Hunger Strike"	Jason Schimmel, Estradasphere	19:30
2.	"Cloud Land"	Tim Smolens	1:04
3.	"The Transformation"	Schimmel	8:25
4.	"Danse of Tosho and Slavi / Randy's Desert Adventure"	John Whooley, Schimmel	7:29
5.	"The Trials and Tribulations of Parking on Your Front Lawn"	Public Domain	4:14
6.	"The Princes of Xibalba": 6. "The Princes" (2:24); 7. "Los Dias Sin Dias" (2:52); 8. "XQuiQ" (2:43); 9. "Hunnahpu and Xbalanque" (3:29)"	Smolens	11:28
10.	"Spreading The Disease"	Murray, Smolens, G. Light	8:10
11.	"Planet Sparkle / Court Yard Battle 1"	Smolens	2:21
12.	"D♭ Hell"	Whooley, Schimmel	12:16
Total length:			74:57

== Album credits ==
=== The band ===
- David Murray – drums, didgeridoo, flute, jaminator, vocals
- Tim Smolens – bass, throat, vocals, keyboard
- Jason Schimmel – guitars, banjo, piano, vocals
- John Whooley – saxophones, vocals, percussion
- Timb Harris – violin, trumpet, mandolin, vocals

=== Additional musicians ===
- Aaron Seeman – accordion on tracks 1, 4, 5
- MonoMan (TM) – positive feedback on track 12
- Joel Robinow – lead vocals on track 3
- Luke Kirley – trombone on track 3
- George – mystery rap on track 3

=== Estradasphere circus ===
- Atrocity & the Death Metal Cheerleaders
- Gren Enyan – Yoga & Spiritual Advisor
- David Poznanter – Balloons, Unicycle & Juggling
- MonoMan (TM) – Disease Transmission
- Soren – Gorilla Suit Guy
- Kim – Chair Massage
- Erin Wood – Pentagram & Sword
- James Vergon – Fan That Wouldn't Go Away
- Iris – Belly Dancing
- George – Book
- Isaac & Jessica – Fire Dancers

=== Other contributions ===
==== Audio ====
- Produced and Engineered by Tim Smolens
- Mixed by Tim Smolens and Trey Spruance
- Mastered by George Horn, February 2000

==== Various ====
- Art Direction – David Murray
- Cover Design – Arena Reed
- Design Assist – Margaret Murray
- Cover Photo – Joey Ryken
- Burning Man Stage – James Vergen
- Group Photos – Greg Enyart & Janette Jancovicova
- MonoMan (TM) – David Murray
- Death Metal Cheerleaders – Naiya C.
- Spreading the Disease – David Murray
