= Le Mani Destre Recise Degli Ultimi Uomini =

Studio album by Secret Chiefs 3
- Released: June 2009
- Genre: Avant-garde
- Length: 40:53
- Label: Mimicry Records
- Producer: Trey Spruance

Secret Chiefs 3 chronology
Xaphan: Book of Angels Volume 9 (2008)	Le Mani Destre Recise Degli Ultimi Uomini (2009)	Satellite Supersonic Vol. 1 (2010)

Le Mani Destre Recise Degli Ultimi Uomini (The Severed Right Hands of the Last Men) is the sixth album by the heavily conceptual American band Secret Chiefs 3 (operating here as Traditionalists, one of the seven satellite bands introduced on Secret Chiefs 3's album Book of Horizons). The album is a paranoiac soundtrack to an imaginary Giallo horror film. The album contains 30 tracks of original music inspired by Italian film composers including Bruno Nicolai, Stelvio Cipriani, Ennio Morricone, Goblin and Piero Piccioni. The album marks the first full-length release by one of the Secret Chiefs 3 satellite bands. Previously, three of the seven satellite bands, UR, The Electromagnetic Azoth and Ishraqiyun have released limited edition 7-inch EPs. Le Mani Destre Recise Degli Ultimi Uomini also had a limited vinyl release.

== Track listing ==
1. "Faith's Broken Mirror" – 0:59
2. "Sophia's Theme" – 2:15
3. "What's Wrong with Cytherea?" – 1:19
4. "Mourning in Ekstasis" – 1:53
5. "He Hates Us" – 1:04
6. "Psychism 1: Cytherea's Possession" – 1:23
7. "Love Spell" – 1:48
8. "Agenda 21" – 1:50
9. "Subcutaneous Solution" – 0:31
10. "Abyss of Psychic Enchantments" – 2:01
11. "Subdermal Sequence (Nano-Correction)" – 0:30
12. "RFID Slaverider" – 1:54
13. "Dionysian Dithyramb (Eros-seed of the Egregore)" – 0:48
14. "Zombievision" – 1:38
15. "Perfectly Reasonable" – 0:16
16. "Psychism 2: Fear is the Great Teacher" – 1:04
17. "Abolish Believers by Abolishing Belief" – 0:30
18. "Funeral for What Might Have Been (Sophia's Theme)" – 3:04
19. "Codex Alimentarius" – 3:18
20. "Putting Forth the Hand to Take" – 0:23
21. "Psychism 3: Sow the Wind, Reap the Whirlwind" – 1:53
22. "Hypnotopia (Obey your Passion)" – 0:27
23. "Nano-correction/Human Migrations/Faith Realizes" – 1:33
24. "Chapel by the Sea (a Heart That is Broken and Humbled...)" – 1:17
25. "The Strength to Sever" – 0:21
26. "Baby Hedone (Harvest of the Egregore)" – 0:45
27. "Zombievision 2012" – 1:42
28. "The Great Die Off (He Mocks Us All)" – 1:16
29. "Cytherea's Awakening/Martyrdom at Romiou Point/Return to the Foam" – 1:02
30. "To Love God is Sweeter than Life (Sophia's Theme)" – 2:27

== Personnel ==
Secret Chiefs 3

- Trey Spruance — vocals, piano, bass guitar, guitars, carillon, celesta, synthesizer, additional percussion, dulcimer, electroacoustic treatments, additional B3 and other Conn and Hammond organs
- Jai Young Kim — Hammond B3 organ
- Timb Harris — violins, viola
- William Winant — vibes, percussion
- Ches Smith and Shahzad Ismaily — drums and bass on tracks 3, 23 and 29

Featuring musicians

- Jason Schimmel — fuzz guitar, vocals
- Laurie Goldstein — cellos
- Hans Teuber — flute
- Dave Abramson — drums
- KT Pierce — vocals
- Kris Hendrickson — vocals, autoharp
