= Palace of Mirrors =

Studio album by Estradasphere
- Released: September 19, 2006
- Studio: The Studio, Jason's House; Pine Forest Studio
- Genre: Experimental rock; progressive rock; avant-garde metal; symphonic metal
- Length: 59:00
- Label: The End
- Producer: Jason Schimmel; Tim Smolens; Timba Harris

Estradasphere chronology
Passion for Life (2004)	Palace of Mirrors (2006)

Professional ratings
Review scores
Source	Rating
AllMusic	4/5 stars
Maelstrom.nu	8.2/10

Palace of Mirrors is the fourth and final full-length album by Estradasphere. It was released on September 19, 2006. The album is composed entirely of instrumental tracks.

The album also signifies a significant change in the band's lineup, with the departure of saxophonist and vocalist John Whooley. This departure is reflected in the album's sound de-emphasis of horns (only being a part of orchestral backing played by session musicians) and vocals.

== Track listing ==
No.	Title	Writer(s)	Length
1.	"Title"	Jason Schimmel, Tim Smolens	0:34
2.	"Palace of Mirrors"	Schimmel	3:41
3.	"A Corporate Merger"	Smolens, Timba Harris, Adam Stacey	8:16
4.	"The Terrible Beautypower of Meow"	Kevin Kmetz, Smolens, Harris	4:01
5.	"Colossal Risk"	Smolens, Harris	4:36
6.	"The Unfolding Pause on the Threshold"	Smolens, Harris	4:17
7.	"Smuggled Mutation"	Traditional	4:48
8.	"Six Hands"	Schimmel	1:12
9.	"The Debutante"	Schimmel	2:44
10.	"Flower Garden of an Evil Man"	Smolens, Harris, Stacey	6:16
11.	"Those Who Know..."	Smolens, Harris	5:18
12.	"Palace of Mirrors (Reprise)"	Smolens, Harris, Schimmel, Trey Spruance	6:20
13.	"The Return"	Smolens, Harris, Schimmel	6:19
Total length:			59:00

== Personnel ==
Estradasphere

- Jason Schimmel – acoustic and electric guitars, bass, organ, lap-steel guitar, keyboards
- Adam Stacey – accordion, piano, clavinet, melodica, organ, synthesizers
- Tim Smolens – double bass, bass, guitars, keyboards, harmonica
- Kevin Kmetz – guitars, shamisen
- Timba Harris – violin, trumpet, percussion, mandolin, electric guitars
- Lee Smith – drums (tracks 1, 3–8, 10–13)

Additional musicians

- Aria DiSalvio – cello (tracks 2, 4, 13)
- Kaethe Hostetter – viola (tracks 2, 4, 13)
- Sarah Hart – violin (tracks 2, 4, 13)
- Dan Robbins – double bass (tracks 2, 9)
- Mike Shannon – drums (tracks 2, 9), additional drums (track 5)
- Shelley Phillips – English horn (track 2)
- Issac Anderson – orchestral percussion (track 2)
- Charlie Gurke – baritone saxophone (tracks 4, 5, 7, 11)
- Scott Harris – bass trombone (tracks 4, 5, 7, 11)
- Luke Kirley – trombone (tracks 4, 5, 7, 11)
- John Thomas – tuba (tracks 4, 5, 7, 11)
- Jennifer Cass – harp (tracks 4, 5, 12)
- William Winant – timpani (tracks 4, 5, 11), glockenspiel (tracks 4, 5)
- Robin Anderson – trumpet (tracks 4, 5, 7, 11)
- Adam Stacey, Bob Hathaway, Chip Yamada, Jason Schimmel, Tim Smolens, Timba Harris – male choir (tracks 4, 5, 11)
- Shashona Brooks – vocals (tracks 4, 5)
- Renata Bratt – cello (tracks 5, 11)
- Elena Doroftei – viola (tracks 5, 11)
- Ben Blechman – violin (tracks 5, 11)
- Aaron Seeman – accordion (track 7)
- Fabrice Martinez – violin (track 7)
- Eric Lesch – French horn (track 9)
- Joel Ford – saxophone (track 9)
- Markos Sowlakis – clarinet, bass clarinet (track 12)

Production

- Jason Schimmel – production, engineering (tracks 1, 2, 6, 8, 9, 12, 13), mixing (tracks 1, 6, 8, 12, 13)
- Tim Smolens – production, engineering, mixing (tracks 1, 3–8, 10–13)
- Timba Harris – production, engineering, mixing (tracks 3–8, 10–13)
- Andrew Kapner – mixing (tracks 2, 9))
- Justin Phelps, Steve Armstrong – analog mixing
- Chris Parsons – engineering
- John Cuniberti – mastering
