= Hyde Street Studios =

American music recording facility in San Francisco

Coordinates: 37.7831°N 122.4160°W

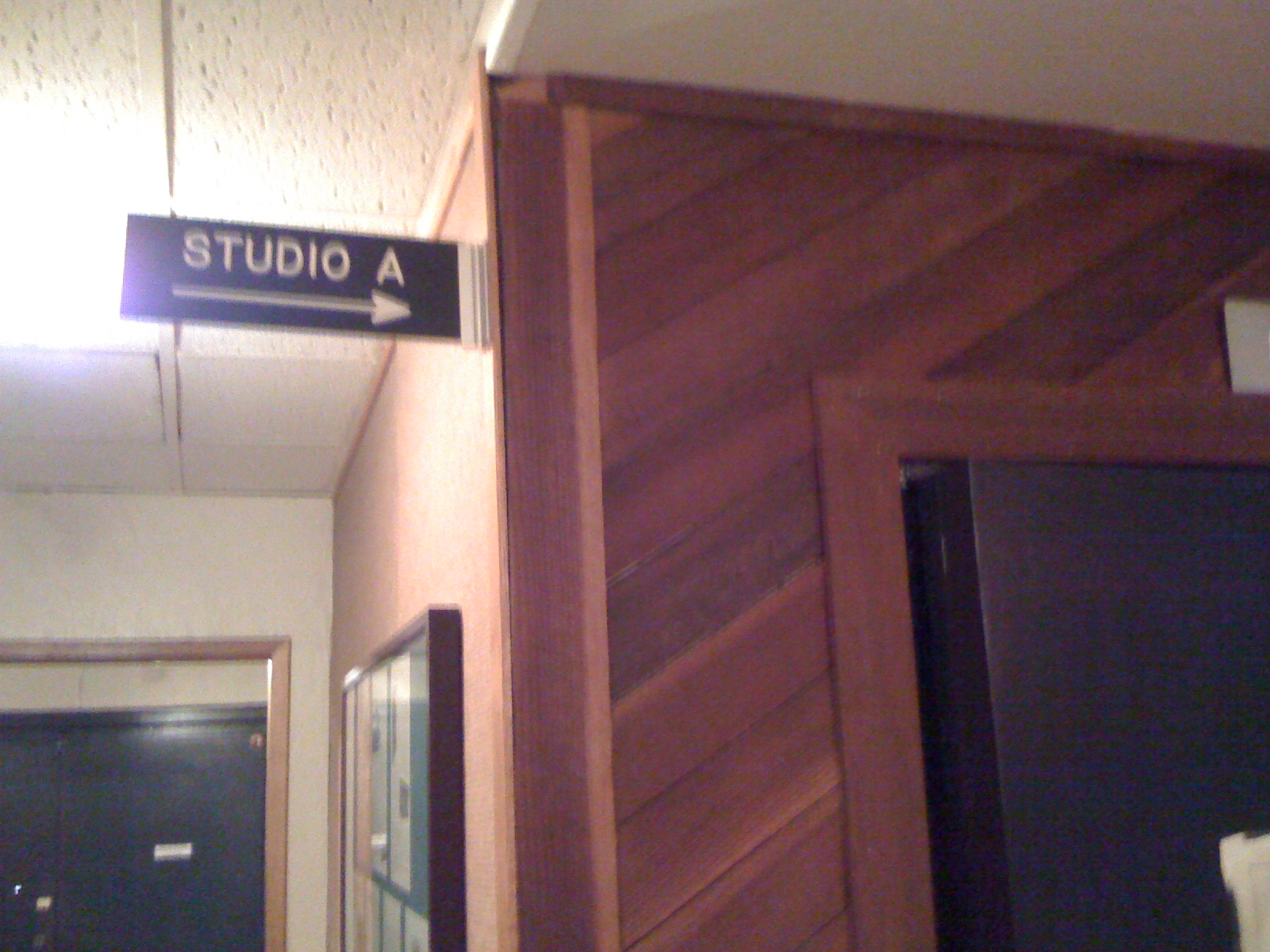
- Studio A, Hyde Street Studios (formerly Wally Heider Studios)
- Industry: Recording studio
- Predecessor: Wally Heider Studios
- Founded: United States (1980)
- Headquarters: California, United States
- Website: Official website

Hyde Street Studios is an American music recording facility in San Francisco, California. Located at 245 Hyde Street and previously occupied by Wally Heider Studios, it became Hyde Street Studios in 1980 when it was taken over by local songwriter, musician, and independent record producer Michael Ward with his two partners Tom Sharples and former Tewkesbury Sound studio owner Dan Alexander, who initially had a 50 percent share in the business. Ward assumed full ownership in 1985.

Alexander initially outfitted Hyde Street Studios with equipment from the defunct Tewksbury Sound, which Ward and Sharples had helped to build, and began acquiring older model microphones and other pieces of audio equipment not popular at the time but that have since become considered classic.

The building contains multiple large recording rooms: Studio A, operated by Hyde Street Studios, and Studios C and D, leased to sub-tenants; Studio E, added in the 1980s; and Studio B, a converted game room used for recording beginning in the 2000s; as well as numerous smaller audio production spaces. Rancho Rivera, the site of Michael Ward's home recording operation in San Francisco's Sunset District before Hyde Street Studios opened, was utilized by Tommy Tutone in its original incarnation in the 1970s; it reopened in 2017.

Studio A features a 970 ft^{2} (90 m^{2}) live area and a 1975 Neve 8038 console mixer with 38 input channels and Flying Faders automation, originally installed, modified and upgraded circa 1992 by Chief Project Engineer Garry Creiman.

== Other features ==
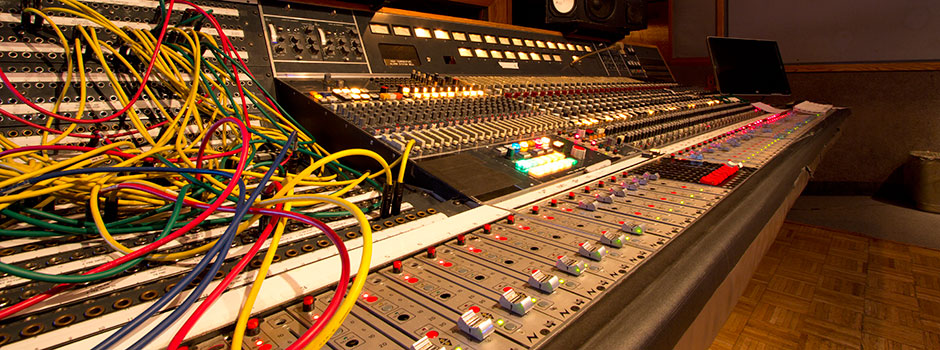
Hyde Street Studios Neve 8038 Console

The echo chamber is a small, unevenly shaped room with walls of irregular lengths and an absence of right angles, to maximize sound reflection while minimizing standing sound waves to achieve long reverb decay times without the comb filtering associated with standing waves.

The Hyde Street Studios vintage original microphone collection includes AKG C12 tube microphones and various Neumann valve capacitor microphones, among them KM54s, M49s, U67s, and U47s, such as the Neumann/Telefunken U47P Tube (with rare optional adapters).

== Historical significance ==
=== Wally Heider Studios (1969–1980) ===
The 1931 building situated at 245 Hyde Street was formerly used by 20th Century Fox for offices, film screening rooms and storage.

It was right across the street from the Blackhawk nightclub, where a series of Miles Davis's live sessions in the mid '60s, were recorded by Heider.

It began life as a recording studio in 1969 when Wally Heider, who already operated an independent recording studio in Los Angeles, decided to expand his business to San Francisco, reportedly at least in part in order to continue working with Crosby, Stills and Nash who were relocating there.

The San Francisco Bay Area's first high-tech studio, one capable of competing with Los Angeles and New York studios in drawing independent recording artists, Wally Heider Studios initially consisted of one room (now Studio C) designed by Dave Mancini. Crucially, it offered artists complete freedom that they could not find when recording at studios controlled by record labels.

During Heider's tenancy many landmark albums of the psychedelic rock era were recorded at his facility. Bands native to or based in the Bay Area such as Jefferson Airplane, Creedence Clearwater Revival, and the Grateful Dead recorded numerous albums at the facility, defining what became known as the San Francisco Sound.

Wally Heider Studios became well established enough to draw major national recording acts like Eric Burdon, The Byrds, David Crosby, Hot Tuna, Van Morrison, Graham Nash, Boz Scaggs, The Steve Miller Band, and T-Rex.

In addition to legendary engineers like Stephen Barncard having worked there, Wally Heider Studios is also notable for having had some of the first female engineers in the industry, including Suzy Foot, who worked on major albums by Patti LaBelle and Herbie Hancock and Amigos by Carlos Santana; Marnie Moore, one of Foot's former students at the Family Light School of Music; and Ann Fry who was with Wally Heider Studios until it closed and then moved on to the Record Plant in Sausalito. Foot later returned to assume the position of Studio Manager at Hyde Street Studios for a time and was instrumental in securing the Neve console installed in Studio A.

In April 2012 the Uptown Tenderloin Museum placed a plaque in the sidewalk in front of 245 Hyde Street recognizing it as the site of the former Wally Heider Studios.

=== Hyde Street Studios (1980–present) ===
Like Wally Heider Studios before it, Hyde Street Studios has been utilized by a multitude of musical artists, both those native to the San Francisco Bay Area and from around the world, such as Cake, Dead Kennedys, Green Day, Tupac Shakur, Michael Franti and Spearhead, Sound Tribe Sector 9, Four2one, Chris Isaak, Tim Buckley, Lost Dog Found, George Clinton, Danny James, Train and Triple Wisdom, representing a wide array of musical styles and genres. Originally from San Francisco, Michael Franti recorded Chocolate Supra Highway and People In Tha Middle with Spearhead on the Capitol Records label at HSS, then returned to record Everyone Deserves Music as Michael Franti and Spearhead on their own independent label, Boo Boo Wax. Joe Satriani recorded his 1986 debut album Not of This Earth at Hyde Street Studios, as well as several subsequent records. Country legend Willie Nelson worked there, and the Walk The Line soundtrack was recorded at HSS. San Francisco natives Train returned to their hometown to record their comeback album, Save Me, San Francisco.

Just as the bands who gave birth to the San Francisco Sound in the 1970s helped to define an era and genre of music, the artists recording at Hyde Street during the 1980s and 90s made important contributions to Punk and West Coast Rap. Under the supervision of Jello Biafra, the studios then-manager John Cuniberti engineered Dead Kennedys' controversial Frankenchrist album there: "The way those [Dead Kennedys] records were recorded and mixed created an ambience that was atypical of other punk bands at the time. Most of their records were recorded very dry, but they wanted to manipulate the recording environment to produce a sound that no one else had. Frankenchrist is like no other punk record ever made, and no other has been made like it since." Tracks for the 1997 Generations 1- A Punk Look At Human Rights compilation CD were laid down there.

Influential East Bay hip-hop group Digital Underground recorded Sex Packets at Hyde Street Studios and the critically acclaimed 2Pacalypse Now by Tupac Shakur, whose career the group helped to launch, was later mixed there.

In May 2009 Michael Ward donated his business records and booking calendars to the Rock & Roll Hall of Fame. The Rock & Roll Hall of Fame asserts that the records "document the inner workings of a prominent recording studio and provide a behind-the-scenes look at an integral part of the music business."

== Rancho Rivera ==
Rancho Rivera is an annex studio in San Francisco’s Sunset District.

== Studio A ==
Recording artists who have recorded in Hyde Street's "Studio A" include:

- Train
- 2Pac
- Kesha
- Walk the Moon
- Teyana Taylor
- Rappin 4 Tay
- Lil B
- Dwight Yoakam
- George Clinton
- Willie Nelson
- Jerry Garcia Band
- Cake
- Kanye West
- Mario
- Santana
- 2 Chainz
- Grateful Dead
- Pointer Sisters
- Chris Isaak
- Michael Franti and Spearhead
- A$AP Ferg
- Chuck Prophet
- OneRepublic
- Crosby Stills Nash and Young
- Tower of Power
- Zigaboo Modeliste
- Jefferson Airplane
- The Jars

== Albums Recorded, Mixed or Mastered at Hyde Street ==
=== 1980s ===
- Mercenaries – Mercenaries For Hire (7") (1981)
- Scream – Gov't Primer (EP) (1982)
- Dead Kennedys – Bleed For Me (12") (1982)
- Flipper – Album Generic Flipper (1982)
- Dead Kennedys – Plastic Surgery Disasters (1983)
- Chrome – 3rd From The Sun (1983)
- Sluglords – Trails Of Slime (1984)
- Code of Honor – Beware the Savage Jaw (1984)
- Dead Kennedys – Frankenchrist (1985)
- Rudiments – Bitch Bitch Bitch (1986)
- Joe Satriani – Not Of This Earth (1986)
- Joe Satriani – Always With Me, Always With You (1987)
- Femme Fatales – I Need A Date (12") (1987)
- Blind Illusion – The Sane Asylum (1988)
- Chris Brown – Snakecharmer (1989)
- Joe Satriani – Flying In A Blue Dream (1989)
- The Jars – 'Jar Wars' (1980)

=== 1990s ===
- Fenton and The Elevators – Good Judgement (1990)
- Various Artists – Sound Bites From The Counter Culture(1990)
- Snakefinger – Manual Of Errors (1990)
- Mazzy Star – She Hangs Brightly (1990)
- Voice Farm – Bigger Cooler Weirder (1991)
- Flipper – American Grafishy (1992)
- Snakefingers's Vestal Virgins – Night of Desirable Objects (1993)
- Del the Funky Homosapien – No Need For Alarm (1993)
- The Coup – "Dig It" (single), Not Yet Free (Maxi) (1993)
- The Brain Transplants – Meet The Brain Transplants (1993)
- Melvins – Houdini (1993)
- Joe Satriani – Surfing With The Alien (1993)
- Various Artists – A Low Down Dirty Shame Original Motion Picture Soundtrack (1994)
- American Music Club - San Francisco (1994)
- Casual – Fear Itself (1994)
- Paula Cole – Harbinger (1994)
- Extra Prolific – Like It Should Be (1994)
- Sonny Simmons – Ancient Ritual (1994)
- Souls of Mischief – Never No More (12") (1994)
- Mr. Bungle – Disco Volante (1995)
- Red House Painters – Ocean Beach (1995)
- Souls of Mischief – No Man's Land (1995)
- Custard – Wisenheimer (1995)
- Green Day – Insomniac (1995)
- Chris Isaak – Wicked Game 1996 Baja Sessions (1996)
- Core – Revival (1996)
- Grotus – Mass (1996)
- Mark Einzel – 60 Watt Silver Lining (1996)
- Red House Painters – Songs For A Blue Guitar (1996)
- Rudiments – Bitch Bitch Bitch (1996)
- Digital Underground – Sex Packets, "Oregano Flow" (single) 1996, "Walk Real Cool" (single) (1996)
- Tony Toni Tone – House of Music (1996)
- Machine Head – The More Things Change (1997)
- Various Artists – Lounge-A-Palooza (1997)
- Skinlab – Bound, Gagged And Blindfolded (1997)
- Exodus – Another Lesson In Violence (1997)
- Ratos De Porao – Carniceria Tropical (1997)
- Custard – We Have The Technology (1997)
- Cake – Prolonging The Magic (1998)
- Joe Satriani – Crystal Planet (1998)
- 2Pac – 2Pacalypse Now (mixed for rerelease) (1998)
- Kyyria – Inner Wellness (1998)
- Charles Brown – In A Grand Style (1999)
- Bobby Kimball – All I Ever Needed (1999)
- Scott Hardkiss Presents God Within – Crucial Introspection Parts One And Two (1999)

=== 2000s ===
- Souls of Mischief – 93 ’Til Infinity 2000 (2000)
- Pete Sears – The Long Haul (2001)
- Cake – Comfort Eagle (2001)
- Lamb – What Sound (2001)
- Lamb – What Sound Limited Edition (2002)
- Meshell Ndegeocello – Cookie: The Anthropological Mixtape (2002)
- Various Artists – Honey (Music From and Inspired by the Motion Picture) (2003)
- The Coup – Party Music (2001)
- Adriana Evans – Nomadic (2004)
- Jello Biafra with The Melvins – Never Breathe What You Can't See (2004)
- Jello Biafra with The Melvins – Sieg Howdy! (2005)
- Jolie Holland – Springtime Can Kill You (2006)
- The Chop Tops - Triple Deuces (2006)
- EyeHateGod – Dopesick (2007)
- Amanda Palmer – Who Killed Amanda Palmer (2008)
- Retribution Gospel Choir – Retribution Gospel Choir (2008)
- Booker T. – Potato Hole (2009)
- Train – Save Me, San Francisco (2009)

=== 2010s ===
- Secret Chiefs 3 – Satellite Supersonic Vol. 1 (2010)
- Gee-Soul Affliction – Evolved with the Soul of Elation (2011)
- Trainwreck Riders – Ghost Yards (2012)
- Bob Mould – Silver Age (2012)
- Train – California 37 (2012)
- Secret Chiefs 3 – Book of Souls: Folio A (2013)
- Earth, Wind, and Fire – Now, Then, and Forever (2013)
- Sun Kil Moon – Benji (2014)
- Tobias Jesso Jr. – Goon (2015)
- Ian Kashani – The Boy with Powers of Invisibility (2016)
- Hope Sandoval and the Warm Inventions – Until the Hunter (2016)
- Chuck Prophet – Bobby Fuller Died For Your Sins (2017)
- Marcus Orelias – 20s A Difficult Age (Mastered) (2017)
- The Millards - Trip To Chonchville (2018)
