= Quadropus =

Studio album by Estradasphere
- Released: October 28, 2003
- Genre: Experimental rock
- Length: 62:37
- Label: Mimicry
- Producer: Tim Smolens; Jason Schimmel; Andrew Kapner

Estradasphere chronology
Buck Fever (2002)	Quadropus (2003)	Passion for Life (2004)

'Quadropus' is the third full-length album by Estradasphere. It was released on October 28, 2003. The name of the album references a "four-legged octopus", which itself is referencing the four members that make up the band.

== Track listing ==
1. "Mekapses Yitonisa" – 4:22
2. "Dubway" – 3:39
3. "King Krab Battle" – 8:31
4. "Speck" – 4:34
5. "Hardball" – 13:40
6. "A Car Ride In Idealistic Ethiopia (Part 1)" – 5:47
7. "Crystal Blue" – 3:40
8. "Jungle Warfare" – 5:42
9. "Body Slam" – 3:09
10. "At Least We'd Have Today" – 9:40

== Album credits ==
=== The band ===
- Timb Harris – violin, viola, trumpet, guitar, mandolin, Turkish mandolin, vocals, percussion
- Jason Schimmel – guitars (electric, acoustic, baritone), banjo, organ, piano, synths, harpsichord, vocals, percussion, beatboxing
- Tim Smolens – bass (electric, upright), bari guitar, piano, synths, violin/viola/cello, vocals, percussion
- John Whooley – saxophones, flute, vocals, beatboxing, organ

=== Additional musicians ===
- String quartet on "At Least We'd Have Today" and "Speck"
  - Violins – Timb and Ben Blechman
  - Viola – Sarah Hart
  - Cello – Aria DiSalvio
- Horn section on "King Krab Battle"
  - Trumpets – Timb, Val Hall, Richard Karst
  - Trombone – Scott Harris
  - Bass trombone – Luke Kirley
  - Saxes – John Whooley, Joel Ford, Scott Norgren, Paul Tarantino, Wes Anthony
  - Tuba – John Thomas

=== Album Personnel ===
- Produced by Tim Smolens with help from Jason Schimmel except for:
  - "Speck" – produced by Jason Schimmel
  - "Dubway" – produced by Andrew Kapner
- Recorded mostly in our living rooms (George's too), plus Bear Creek Studios, Pine Forest studios, CC's recording studio and Angelhouse Studios
- Engineered by Tim Smolens, Jason Schimmel, Chris Parsons and Trey Spruance
- Mixed by Tim Smolens, Timb Harris and Jason Schimmel
  - "Dubway" mixed by Andrew Kapner
  - "Bodyslam" mixed by Chris Parsons
  - "Jungle Warfare" and "Speck" mixed by Trey Spruance
- Additional engineering by Chris Parsons
- Artwork and layout by Mike Bennewitz

=== Dedication ===
Quadropus was created in loving memory of Mary Aquinas McClafferty Whooley and John Patrick Whooley Sr.

== Song information ==
=== Mekapses Yitonisa ===
- Composition – Greek traditional
- Arranged and transcribed by Tim and Timb
- Drums – Dave Murray
- Dombeks and percussion – Mike Shannon

=== Dubway ===
- Composition – Estradasphere
- Acapellarrangement – John and Jason

==== Trivia ====
- Absolutely no keyboards, drum machines, guitars or bass were used in the recording of this song.
- A live music video for the song is included on the DVD of Passion for Life.

=== King Krab Battle ===
- Composition – Iron Chef Whooley
- Horn arrangement by John and Tim
- Drums – Theo Mordey

=== Speck ===
- Composition – Schimmel
- Lyrics by Schimmel, Smolens
- Lead vocals – Jason
- String arrangement by Trey Spruance
- Piano – Jeff Attridge
- Drums – Theo Mordey

=== Hardball ===
- Composition – Schimmel, Whooley, Harris
- Drums – Theo Mordey
- Percussion – Doug Smolens

=== A Car Ride in Idealistic Ethiopia (Part 1) ===
- Composition – Smolens
- Drums – Dave Murray

=== Crystal Blue ===
- Composition – Whooley
- Lead vocals – John
- Organ and piano – Dale Ockerman
- Drums and tambourine – Mike Shannon

=== Jungle Warfare ===
- Composition – Schimmel, Smolens
- Lyrics by Dave Murray
- Vocals – Dave Murray and Youri Raymond of Unhuman
- Drums – John Merryman of Cephalic Carnage
- Guitar solo – Kevin Kmetz

=== Bodyslam ===
- Composition – Estradasphere, Dave Murray
- Lyrics and lead vocals – John
- Drums – Dave

=== At Least We'd Have Today ===
- Composition – Smolens
- Lead vocals – Tim
- Vocal bridge – Joel Robinow
