= Book M =

Studio album by Secret Chiefs 3
- Released: 11 September 2001
- Recorded: 2001
- Studio: Various: Coast Recorders; (San Francisco, CA); Feast or Famine; (San Francisco, CA); Littlefield Pipe Organ Chamber; (San Diego, CA); Mills College; (Oakland, CA); Rohypnol Studios; (London, UK); Found Sound; (San Francisco, CA)
- Genre: Experimental rock
- Length: 54:58
- Label: Web of Mimicry
- Producer: Trey Spruance

Secret Chiefs 3 chronology
Eyes of Flesh, Eyes of Flame (1999)	Book M (2001)	Book of Horizons (2004)

Book M is the third studio album by Secret Chiefs 3, released on 11 September 2001 by Web of Mimicry. According to a post the band made on Facebook, "Our distributor’s release date was September 18. Our label’s release date was Sept. 11. Our trusty label’s mail-order timed the CD shipment to land on people’s doorsteps right at that fateful moment on Sept 11. So if you’re one of the people who remembers this record playing during the period of major conflagration and upheaval, no you did not hallucinate that, and no you are not alone. A majority of people got the record on Sept 11." Founding member Trevor Dunn appeared on only one song, due to scheduling conflicts with the metal supergroup Fantômas in which he also performs.

== Reception ==
Professional ratings
Review scores
Source	Rating
AllMusic	4/5 stars

Blake Butler of AllMusic commended the production and musicianship of Book M, saying "the band proves that they command an amazing grip on their musical reigns, executing flawlessly tight arrangements, even if they are extremely peculiar." Sean Murphy of PopMatters called the album "a near-masterpiece and while it’s delightfully weird enough to scare off the amateurs, there is abundant joy to be found within."

== Track listing ==
All tracks are written by Trey Spruance except where otherwise noted.

Observance of the Word
No.	Title	Writer(s)	Length
1.	"Knights of Damcar"		2:59
2.	"Hagia Sophia"		4:08
3.	"Vajra"	traditional	3:34
4.	"Ship of Fools (Stone of Exile)"		3:35

Engagement of the Sword
No.	Title	Writer(s)	Length
5.	"Horsemen of the Invisible"		3:36
6.	"Combat for the Angel"		6:03
7.	"Zulfiqar III"		5:14
8.	"Siege Perilous"	Salterello IV, traditional	5:42
9.	"Dolorous Stroke"		2:35

Ritual of the Cup
No.	Title	Writer(s)	Length
10.	"Blaze of the Grail"	Rahul Dev Burman	3:58
11.	"Lapsit Exillis"		1:38
12.	"Lapis Baitulous"		2:23
13.	"Safina"	Girma Beyene	9:35

== Personnel ==
Adapted from the Book M liner notes.

Secret Chiefs 3

- Danny Heifetz – drums (3, 5, 6, 9, 10, 11, 13), goblet drum (1, 4, 11, 12), riq (4, 11, 12), zills (5, 11, 12)
- Trey Spruance – production, engineering, keyboards (1, 2, 4–7, 9–13), bağlama (1, 4, 8, 12), guitar (2, 3, 5, 6, 7, 9–13), additional programming (2, 5, 7), electronics (2, 6, 8), Sympitar (3, 12), bass guitar (3, 13), tar (4, 8), trumpet (10, 13), organ (4, 6, 7), arrangements (3), electric guitar (4), twelve-string guitar (4), microtonal guitar (5), percussion (7), remixing (7), goblet drum (8), electric piano (10), zither (10), art direction, illustrations, design
- William Winant – tom drums (5), bass drum (8), cymbals (8), frame drum (8), sampler (9), zills (11), bells (12)

Additional musicians

- Trevor Dunn — bass guitar (9)
- Timb Harris — violin (1, 8, 11, 12), viola (8)
- Eyvind Kang – violin (3, 5, 6, 10, 13), cello (7)
- Fatima Khanoam – santur (1, 4, 11)
- Clinton "Bär" McKinnon – saxophone (10, 13)
- Jason Schimmel – mandolin (4), acoustic guitar (4)
- Danny Shamoun – goblet drum (1, 4), riq (1, 4)
- Tim Smolens – contrabass (1, 4, 11), cello (1, 11, 12), bass guitar (6)

Production and design

- Billy Anderson – engineering (1–8, 10–13)
- Thom Canova – mastering, recording (9)
- Earl Kluck – typesetting, design
- Mari Kono – illustrations, design

== Release history ==
Region	Date	Label	Format	Catalog
United States	2001	Web of Mimicry	CD	WOM 006
France	2015	!Angrr!	LP	GRr 018
