= Hurqalya (Second Grand Constitution and Bylaws) =

Studio album by Secret Chiefs 3
- Released: April 28, 1998
- Studios: Forking Paths Studios (San Francisco, CA)
- Genres: Experimental rock, instrumental surf, breakcore
- Length: 50:56
- Label: Amarillo
- Producer: Trey Spruance

Secret Chiefs 3 chronology
First Grand Constitution and Bylaws (1996)	Hurqalya (Second Grand Constitution and Bylaws) (1998)	Eyes of Flesh, Eyes of Flame (1999)

Hurqalya (Second Grand Constitution And Bylaws) is the second studio album by American experimental rock band Secret Chiefs 3, released on April 28, 1998 by Amarillo Records.

== Release history ==
In 2000, Web of Mimicry remastered and reissued the album on CD bonus tracks "Zulkifar II". In 2011, French label !Angrr! issued the release with a further bonus track on vinyl.

== Critical reception ==
Professional ratings
Review scores
Source	Rating
AllMusic	4.5/5 stars

Greg Prato of AllMusic praised the band for their seamless blending of disparate musical genres and called the album "one of 1998's most rewarding, original, and ambitious recordings." A critic for Ink 19 gave it a mixed review but called the compositions unique but somewhat grating. CMJ New Music Monthly gave the album a positive review and said "though more of an obscurist's delight than a proper metal band, SC3 has enough grindcore drum blasts and highspeed thematic switches to make it interesting to metal minds."

== Track listing ==
No.	Title	Music	Length
1.	"The Rose Garden of Mystery"	Heifetz, Kang, Spruance, Winant	2:38
2.	"Book T: Waves of Blood"	Heifetz, Spruance	2:29
3.	"Book T: Broken Glass Hearse"	Heifetz, Spruance	2:28
4.	"Renunciation"	Heifetz, Kang, McKinnon, Spruance, Winant	4:32
5.	"Jãbalqã"	Heifetz, Spruance	4:31
6.	"Book T: Orbital Ballroom in the Hall of Resurrection"	Heifetz, Spruance	2:15
7.	"Mera Pyar Shalimar"	Allen, Heifetz, McKinnon, Spruance, Winant	4:57
8.	"Jãbarsã"	Heifetz, Spruance	4:27
9.	"Beyond the Mountain Qaf"	Spruance	5:58
10.	"Hurqalya"	Heifetz, Spruance, Winant	16:42

2000 Remastered Edition
No.	Title	Music	Length
1.	"The Rose Garden of Mystery"	Heifetz, Kang, Spruance, Winant	2:38
2.	"Book T: Waves of Blood"	Heifetz, Spruance	2:29
3.	"Book T: Broken Glass Hearse"	Heifetz, Spruance	2:28
4.	"Renunciation"	Heifetz, Kang, McKinnon, Spruance, Winant	4:30
5.	"Jãbalqã"	Heifetz, Spruance	4:31
6.	"Book T: Orbital Ballroom in the Hall of Resurrection"	Heifetz, Spruance	2:15
7.	"Mera Pyar Shalimar"	Allen, Heifetz, McKinnon, Spruance, Winant	4:55
8.	"Zulfikar II"	Heifetz, Kang, Spruance, Winant	4:06
9.	"Jãbarsã"	Heifetz, Spruance	4:24
10.	"Beyond the Mountain Qaf"	Spruance	5:58
11.	"Hurqalya"	Heifetz, Spruance, Winant	16:38

== Personnel ==
Adapted from the Hurqalya (Second Grand Constitution and Bylaws) liner notes.

Secret Chiefs 3

- Danny Heifetz – drums, dumbek, zil, tambourine, shaker
- Trey Spruance – electric guitar, bass guitar, keyboards, organ, mandolin, zither, saz, trumpet, synthesizer, tape, programming, vocals, production, engineering, illustrations, art direction
- William Winant – percussion, kanjira, timpani, cymbal, bells, hammered dulcimer

Additional musicians

- Laura Allen – vocals (7)
- Eyvind Kang – violin and erhu (1, 4, 8)
- Clinton "Bär" McKinnon – flute (4, 7)
- Paul Dal Porto – sitar (4)

Production and design

- Jai Young Kim – mastering
- Mari Kono – photography
- Margaret Murray – design
- Rebecca Wilson – photography

== Release history ==
Region	Date	Label	Format	Catalog
United States	1998	Amarillo	CD	ACM-609
United States	2000	Web of Mimicry	CD	WoM 004
France	2012	!Angrr!	LP	GRr 016
