= Book of Horizons =

Studio album by Secret Chiefs 3
- Released: May 25, 2004
- Genre: Experimental rock, Avant-garde metal
- Length: 52:56
- Label: Mimicry
- Producer: Trey Spruance

Secret Chiefs 3 chronology
Book M (2001)	Book of Horizons (2004)	Path of Most Resistance (2007)

Book of Horizons is the fourth studio album by Secret Chiefs 3, released May 25, 2004. Book of Horizons was the first Secret Chiefs 3 album to reveal the satellite bands that form the actual band under their own names. Out of the seven bands only one, NT Fan, was not heard on the album at all. The other six are The Electromagnetic Azoth, UR, Ishraqiyun, Traditionalists, Holy Vehm and FORMS. Since the release of Book of Horizons the satellite bands have seen several releases of their own.

== Content ==
"The Owl in Daylight" is inspired by the final, unfinished novel of the same name by renowned science fiction writer Philip K. Dick before his death. The song "Book T: Exodus" is the theme of the 1960 film The Exodus composed by Ernest Gold.

== Reception ==
Professional ratings
Review scores
Source	Rating
Allmusic	4.5/5 stars
Pitchfork	8.2/10
Scene Point Blank	9/10 stars

The Allmusic review by William York stated "Secret Chiefs 3's first three studio albums were not exactly stripped-down affairs, but Book of Horizons is by far an ambitious release ... this is a frequently jaw-dropping album that should silence Spruance's anti-Bungle critics and, more importantly, challenge and entertain devoted fans of his past work". Daniel Lukes of Lollipop Magazine called the work "plaintive, harsh, witty, baffling, and thrillingly alien," saying "The overall effect is akin to the imaginary soundtrack to an uncanny, Burroughs-esque parallel universe where gumshoes mix with Arabian mystics, cowboys, and aliens in search for the Ultimate Truth." Pitchfork contributor Jonathan Zwickel noted "Over three years in the making, Book of Horizons is Secret Chiefs' most expansive and coherent statement, an alchemical fusion of Morricone-esque cinematic grandeur, midnight surf guitar, traditional Middle Eastern rhythms and time signatures, demonic death metal, and electronic deviance that yields a work of undeniable force"

The Scene Point Blank review warned "If you have a short attention span you are probably going to get lost mid-way through Book of Horizons. If you're looking for something straightforward, this will be a waste of your time. This is experimental music at its finest".

== Track listing ==
All tracks are written by Trey Spruance (credited as "The Enemy" on Holy Vehm tracks), except where noted.

No.	Title	Satellite band	Length
1.	"The End Times"	FORMS	4:58
2.	"The 4 (The Great Ishraqi Sun)"	Ishraqiyun	3:37
3.	"The Indestructible Drop"	Traditionalists	1:09
4.	"Exterminating Angel"	Holy Vehm	3:14
5.	"The Owl in Daylight"	FORMS	3:58
6.	"The Exile"	Traditionalists	3:08
7.	"On the Wings of the Haoma"	The Electromagnetic Azoth	5:08
8.	"Book T: Exodus" (composed by Ernest Gold)	UR	3:56
9.	"Hypostasis of the Archons"	Holy Vehm	4:21
10.	"The Electrotheonic Grail Dove"	Traditionalists	0:44
11.	"The 3 (Afghan Song)" (composer unknown)	Ishraqiyun	4:01
12.	"DJ Revisionist"	The Electromagnetic Azoth	4:06
13.	"Anthropomorphosis: Boxleitner"	UR	5:24
14.	"Welcome to the Theatron Animatronique"	FORMS	5:11

== Personnel ==
- Trey Spruance – guitars (electric guitar, bass guitar, microtonal guitar, sympitar), keyboards (keyboard, electric piano, acoustic piano, tack piano, clavinet, organ), percussion (dumbek, shaker, tambourine, add'l daf, etc.), santur, rabab, banjo, saz, sheng, synthesizer, sampler, soundscape, Foley sound effects, electroacoustic treatment, vocals, producer, engineer
- Mike Bennewitz – layout design, illustrations
- Thom Canova – engineer
- Unhuman - Vocals
- Jennifer Cass – harp
- Rich Doucette – esraj, sarangi
- Enemy – bass guitar, guitar, sampling
- Fatima – santur
- Jesse Greere – vocals
- Timb Harris – violin, viola
- Danny Heifetz – drums
- Shahzad Ismaily – percussion (dhol, mridangam, ghatam, zil, etc.)
- Eyvind Kang – viola
- Jai Young Kim – post producer
- Jessika Kenney – vocals
- Kevin Kmetz – shamisen
- Ursula Knudson – bowed saw
- John Merryman – drums
- Chris Parsons – engineer
- Jesse Quattro – vocals
- Jason Schimmel – acoustic guitar
- Ches Smith – drums
- Tim Smolens – bass, engineer
- William Winant – drums, percussion (tabla, marimba, shaker, glockenspiel, gong, tubular bell, timpani, etc.)
