= Path of Most Resistance =

Compilation album by Secret Chiefs 3
- Released: 2007
- Recorded: 1998–2004
- Label: Mimicry
- Producer: Trey Spruance

Secret Chiefs 3 chronology
Book of Horizons (2004)	Path of Most Resistance (2007)	Xaphan: Book of Angels Volume 9 (2008)

Path of Most Resistance is a compilation album of music by Secret Chiefs 3, released in 2007 by Mimicry Records. The album features original compositions from Trey Spruance as well as covers of compositions by Ernest Gold, Ananda Shankar, RD Burman, Tommie Connor, and The Beach Boys. The last three songs had not been released on any other Secret Chiefs 3 album.

No.	Title	Writer(s)	Original Appearance	Length
1.	"Book T: Exodus"	Ernest Gold	Book of Horizons	3:46
2.	"The 4 (Great Ishraqi Sun)"	Trey Spruance	Book of Horizons	3:37
3.	"Ship of Fools (Stone of Exile)"	Spruance	Book M	3:37
4.	"Renunciation"	Ananda Shankar	Second Grand Constitution and Bylaws	4:31
5.	"The Owl in Daylight"	Spruance	Book of Horizons	3:56
6.	"Combat for the Angel"	Spruance	Book M	6:03
7.	"Zulkifar III"	Spruance	Book M	5:13
8.	"The End Times"	Spruance	Book of Horizons	4:54
9.	"Jabalqa" / "Jabarsa" (live)	Spruance	Eyes of Flesh, Eyes of Flame	6:19
10.	"Mera Pyar Shalimar"	R. D. Burman	Second Grand Constitution and Bylaws	4:43
11.	"Ciocarlia" (live)	Traditional	Eyes of Flesh, Eyes of Flame	3:17
12.	"I Saw Mommy Kissing Santa Claus"	Tommie Connor	Previously unreleased	2:36
13.	"Good Vibrations"	Brian Wilson / Mike Love	Smiling Pets	4:01
14.	"Heroes and Villains" (FORMS)	Wilson / Van Dyke Parks	Smiling Pets	4:47
