= Satellite Supersonic Vol. 1 =

Studio album by Secret Chiefs 3
- Released: 2010
- Recorded: 1998–2010
- Genre: Avant-garde
- Length: 47:56
- Label: Mimicry Records
- Producer: Trey Spruance

Secret Chiefs 3 chronology
Le Mani Destre Recise Degli Ultimi Uomini (2009)	Satellite Supersonic Vol. 1 (2010)	Book of Souls: Folio A (2013)

Satellite Supersonic Vol. 1 is a compilation of Secret Chiefs 3 songs. All but one of the songs are by the Secret Chiefs 3's satellite bands UR, Ishraqiyun and Electromagnetic Azoth, making the album the third digital recording to feature such releases. Some of the songs were previously released as limited edition 7-inch singles, whereas others are previously unreleased tracks. The final piece is an unreleased rarity from the early years of the band, recorded in 1998. The previously released songs have seen "a full studio work-over" in 2010. Some of them feature newly recorded material.

== Track listing ==
All tracks are written by Trey Spruance. All songs have been released as 7-inch singles in 2007, except where noted.

No.	Title	Satellite band	Length
1.	"Circumambulation"	UR	5:36
2.	"Balance of the 19"	Ishraqiyun	4:14
3.	"Ubik"	The Electromagnetic Azoth	5:41
4.	"Kulturvultur"	UR	8:03
5.	"Balthassar / Melchior / Kaspar" (previously unreleased)	Ishraqiyun	6:30
6.	"The Left Hand of Nothingness"	The Electromagnetic Azoth	6:06
7.	"Anthropomorphosis: Boxleitner" (different version previously released on Book of Horizons)	UR	5:39
8.	"The Secret Mausoleum of Mankind: Fetish Miniatures of the Suicided Races" (previously unreleased)	NT Fan	6:07

== Personnel ==
- Trey Spruance — guitars (electric guitar, bass guitar, baritone guitar, Pythagorean guitar), piano, organ, percussion, glockenspiel, saz, autoharp, synthesizer, vocals, production, overdubbing, mixing, arrangement, design
- Lucas Abela — power drill
- Anonymous 13 — viola, vocals
- butcherBaker — layout
- Matt Chamberlain — drums
- Mike Dillon — vibraphone, tabla
- Rich Doucette — sarangi
- Timb Harris — violin, viola
- Danny Heifetz — drums
- Bill Horist — prepared guitar
- Shahzad Ismaily — bass guitar
- Eyvind Kang — viola
- Jesse Quattro — vocals
- Kurt Schlegel — mixing
- Ches Smith — drums
