= First Grand Constitution and Bylaws =

Studio album by Secret Chiefs 3
- Released: September 30, 1996
- Studio: Forking Paths Studios (San Francisco, CA)
- Genre: Experimental rock
- Length: 47:08
- Label: Amarillo
- Producer: Trey Spruance

Secret Chiefs 3 chronology
| First Grand Constitution and Bylaws (1996) | Hurqalya (1998) |

First Grand Constitution and Bylaws is the debut studio album by American experimental rock band Secret Chiefs 3, released on September 30, 1996 by Amarillo Records.

== Release history ==
In 2000 Web of Mimicry remastered and reissued the album on CD bonus tracks "Emir of the Bees". In 2011, French label !Angrr! issued the release with a further bonus track on vinyl.

== Critical reception ==
Professional ratings
Review scores
| Source | Rating |
|---|---|
| AllMusic | 4.5/5 stars |

AllMusic praised the album, noting that "the trio somehow [manage] to concoct even more mysterious and demented compositions than Mr. Bungle".

== Track listing ==
All music is composed by Trey Spruance.

| No. | Title | Length |
|---|---|---|
| 1. | "Ana'l Haqq" | 0:22 |
| 2. | "Adept Chamber of the Magian Tavern – Altar to the Master Chief" | 1:11 |
| 3. | "Inn of 3 Doors" | 1:22 |
| 4. | "Breeze of Dawn, Death's Angel" | 2:19 |
| 5. | "Assassin's Blade" | 4:37 |
| 6. | "Bare-faced Bazi" | 2:05 |
| 7. | "Crossroads Through Crosshairs" | 2:21 |
| 8. | "borderland" | 1:21 |
| 9. | "borderland" | 2:04 |
| 10. | "Killing of Kings" | 3:32 |
| 11. | "Celestial Ship of the Corsairs" | 2:13 |
| 12. | "Pointed and Weighty Arguments" | 0:19 |
| 13. | "Zulkifar" | 1:15 |
| 14. | "The Qa'im Deliberates" | 1:16 |
| 15. | "Drunk at the Gates" | 2:08 |
| 16. | "Resurrection Day Soundtrack: Hot Pursuit in Eagles' Nest" | 5:04 |
| 17. | "From Night the Morning Draught of Wine" | 2:31 |
| 18. | "Crosswinds" | 0:36 |
| 19. | "borderland" | 2:31 |
| 20. | "White as They Come" | 8:01 |

2000 Remastered Edition
| No. | Title | Length |
|---|---|---|
| 1. | "Ana'l Haqq" | 0:22 |
| 2. | "Adept Chamber of the Magian Tavern – Altar to the Master Chief" | 1:12 |
| 3. | "Inn of 3 Doors" | 1:22 |
| 4. | "Breeze of Dawn, Death's Angel" | 2:15 |
| 5. | "Assassin's Blade" | 4:37 |
| 6. | "Bare-faced Bazi" | 2:07 |
| 7. | "Crossroads Through Crosshairs" | 2:20 |
| 8. | "borderland" | 1:21 |
| 9. | "borderland" | 2:04 |
| 10. | "Killing of Kings" | 3:31 |
| 11. | "Celestial Ship of the Corsairs" | 2:13 |
| 12. | "Emir of the Bees – Migration – Countersurveillance – The Mazdaean Protocols – Our Man Abu'l – Khattab – Return" | 6:10 |
| 13. | "Pointed and Weighty Arguments" | 0:20 |
| 14. | "Zulkifar" | 1:15 |
| 15. | "The Qa'im Deliberates" | 1:16 |
| 16. | "Drunk at the Gates" | 2:08 |
| 17. | "Resurrection Day Soundtrack: Hot Pursuit in Eagles' Nest" | 5:05 |
| 18. | "From Night the Morning Draught of Wine" | 2:29 |
| 19. | "Crosswinds" | 0:32 |
| 20. | "borderland" | 2:31 |
| 21. | "White as They Come" | 8:04 |

== Personnel ==
Adapted from the First Grand Constitution and Bylaws liner notes.

Secret Chiefs 3

- Trevor Dunn – bass guitar, vocals (6, 14, 15)
- Danny Heifetz – drums, trombone, percussion
- Trey Spruance – electric guitar, organ, synthesizer, sampler, tape, bass guitar (5, 16), vocals (10, 20), recording, mixing, editing, illustrations, art direction

Additional musicians

- Kris Hendrickson – backing vocals (20)
- Clinton "Bär" McKinnon – saxophone (16), bass guitar (17)

Production and design

- Billy Anderson – recording and mixing (5, 8–10, 20)
- Mike Bogus – additional engineering
- Mike Johnson – editing
- Mari Kono – photography
- Margaret Murray – design
- Marc Orten – additional engineering
- Guy Slater – mastering
- Gregg Turkington – executive production

== Release history ==
| Region | Date | Label | Format | Catalog |
|---|---|---|---|---|
| United States | 1996 | Amarillo | CD | ACM-603 |
| United States | 1998 | Web of Mimicry | CD | WoM 003 |
| France | 2012 | !Angrr! | LP | GRr 015 |
