= The Silent Elk of Yesterday =

EP by Estradasphere
- Released: September 18, 2001
- Recorded: ?
- Genre: Experimental music Avant-garde metal Symphonic black metal Jazz; Folk music Swing revival
- Length: 73:54
- Label: Mimicry
- Producer: Estradasphere & Stephen Reysen

Estradasphere chronology
It's Understood (2000)	The Silent Elk of Yesterday (2001)	Buck Fever (2002)

The Silent Elk of Yesterday is an EP by Estradasphere, released in 2001. It mostly consists of live tracks. Despite being nearly 75 minutes long and containing 18 tracks, it is classified as an EP by the band. The EP is "in loving memory of Butt Bud".

== Track listing ==
Tracks 3 and 5 to 18 are recorded live; tracks 1, 2, and 4 are studio recorded.

1. "The Silent Elk of Yesterday"
2. "Crag Lake"
3. "Millennium Child (Live)"
4. "The Dapper Bandits"
5. "The Ventriloquist Choir"
6. "Mekapses Yitonisa"
7. "Burnt Corpse"
8. "Rise n' Shine (EDN#1)"
9. "Disco Time"
10. "A Tune By F.F.C."
11. "The Princes of Xibalba"
12. "The Penguin"
13. "Techno in the Style of Burning Man"
14. "Some Turkish Song"
15. "Aunt Nellies Love Gravy"
16. "Medley #3"
17. "Some Irish Song"
18. "Hungerstrike (Ending)"

== Song information ==
- The songs "The Silent Elk of Yesterday", "Crag Lake" and "The Dapper Bandits" would later be slightly edited to appear on Buck Fever. "Millennium Child", "Burnt Corpse" and "Rise n' Shine" would later appear on the same album as full studio versions.
- "The Princes of Xibalba" and "Hungerstrike" previously appeared on It's Understood.
- "Mekapses Yitonisa" would later open Quadropus.
- "Disco Time" is originally by Don Salsa, a sister band to Estradasphere.
- "A Tune By F.F.C." is originally by the Romanian band Fanfare Ciocărlia. Its official name is "Ah Ya Bibi".
- "Medley #3" contains the songs "No Greater Love", "Misirlou" and "Girl from Ipanema".
