= Santa Cruz Hemp Allstars =

The Santa Cruz Hemp Allstars are a super-jam group put together by Poco Marshall, featuring members of Sound Tribe Sector 9, Estradasphere, Netwerk:Electric, The Disco Biscuits, The Slip, The Living Daylights, and DJ Logic. The first show was held at Palookaville in Santa Cruz, California on April 20, 2001, as a Santa Cruz Hemp Fest afterparty. The group plays totally unrehearsed improvised jam sessions. There have only been a total of seven appearances ever by the Santa Cruz Hemp Allstars. Their last show was completely sold out.

== See also ==
- John Whooley
