= Xaphan =

Fallen angel and demon in Christian Demonology

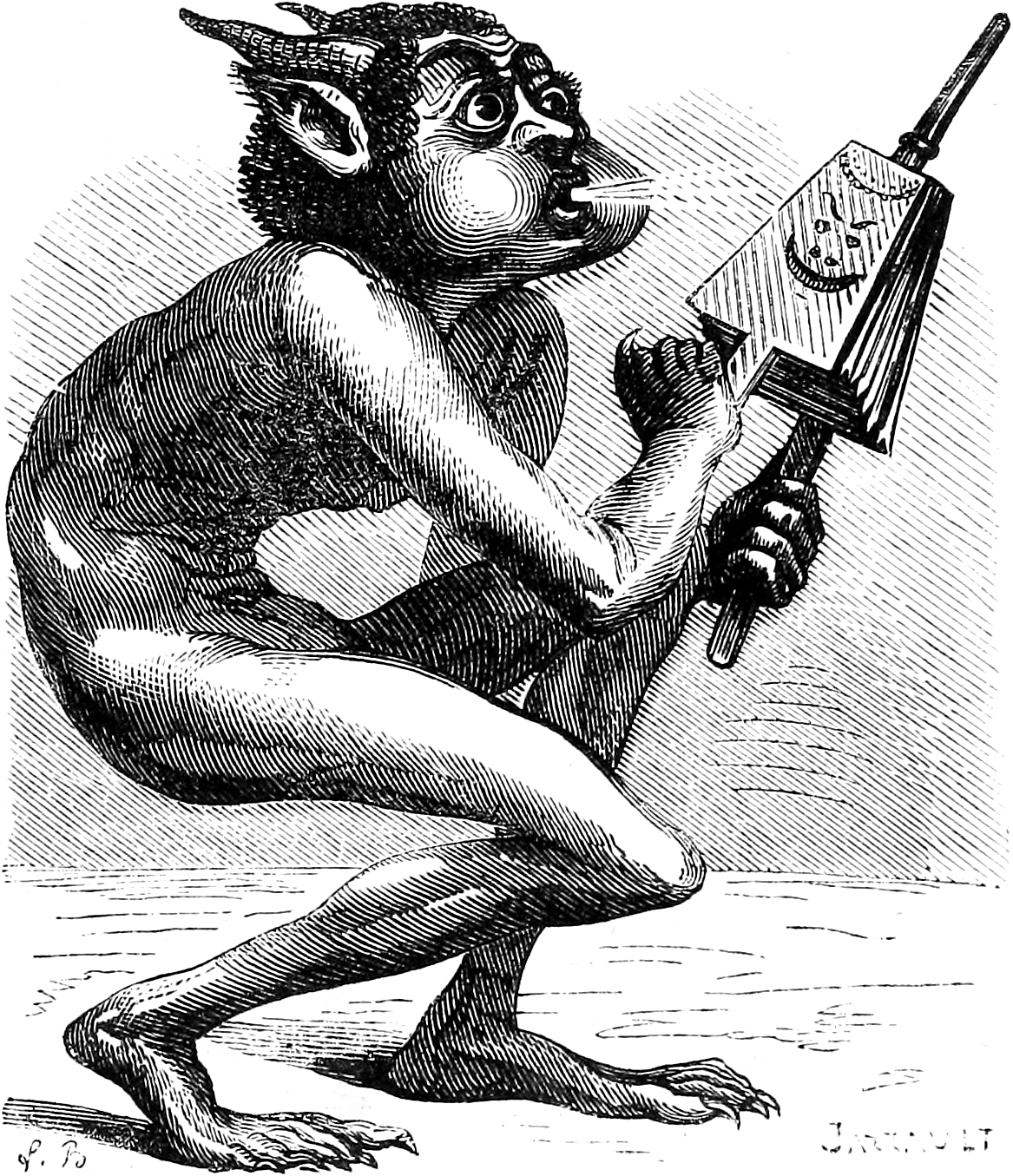
Image of Xaphan (Za-FAN) from Collin de Plancy's Dictionnaire infernal

Xaphan is one of the fallen angels who rebelled with Lucifer against God, and is a demon of the 2nd rank under the command of Satan. In Christian demonology traditions, Xaphan appears as a fallen angel associated with fire.

According to the Encyclopedia of demons in world religions and cultures, Xaphan is said to have a "creative mind." In demonological tradition, this creativity is reflected in his role during Lucifer's rebellion, when he reportedly suggested setting Heaven itself ablaze. After the rebellion failed, Xaphan was cast out of Heaven and into the Abyss alongside the other fallen angels. There, he is said to fan the flames of the furnaces of Hell with his mouth and hands. He has a bellows as an emblem.

Despite his relatively high-ranking classification, Xaphan is an obscure figure in Christian demonology, with only a small number of surviving descriptions of his role and characteristics. Xaphan is not mentioned in the bible; instead, he is documented in early occult literature, most notably Dictionnaire Infernal.

== In popular culture ==
Xaphan has occasionally been adapted in modern music and media. Notable examples include Xaphan: Book of Angels Volume 9 by the band Secret Chiefs 3. These modern depictions typically use the name or character concept independently of the original 19th-century demonological texts by Collin de Plancy.

== Names/variants ==
Xaphan: is the standard spelling in Collin de Plancy's Dictionnaire Infernal 1863. Bane suggests the name Xaphan is possibly Hebrew or Phoenician and it may translate to mean "rabbit." However the original 1863 Dictionnaire Infernal does not say anything about Xaphan's name meaning rabbit.

Xaphan (Zephon): an identification that appears in Gustav Davidson's A Dictionary Of Angels. In John Milton's Paradise Lost, Zephon is an angel who is sent to find Satan. Davidson subsequently identifies that figure with Xaphan, writing "Xaphan (Zephon)." However in de Plancy's 1863 entry, he's simply Xaphan. There is no "Zephon" in the entry.

Xaphon: is a variant listed in Theresa Bane's Encyclopedia of demons in world religions and cultures.

Guzfan: is also listed as a variant by Bane.
