= Xaphan: Book of Angels Volume 9 =

Studio album by Secret Chiefs 3
- Released: May 2008
- Genre: Avant-garde
- Length: 55:29
- Label: Tzadik
- Producer: Trey Spruance

Book of Angels chronology
Volac: Book of Angels Volume 8 (2007)	Xaphan: Book of Angels Volume 9 (2008)	Lucifer: Book of Angels Volume 10 (2008)

Secret Chiefs 3 chronology
Path of Most Resistance (2007)	Xaphan: Book of Angels Volume 9 (2008)	Le Mani Destre Recise Degli Ultimi Uomini (2009)

Xaphan: Book of Angels Volume 9 is an album by the Secret Chiefs 3 performing compositions from John Zorn's second Masada book, "The Book of Angels". It is the fifth studio album to be released by the Secret Chiefs 3. As with the other volumes of the Book of Angels series, the titles of the songs are characters from Jewish and Christian mythology. The title of the album, Xaphan refers to one of the fallen angels who rebelled with Satan and set the Heaven on fire.

== Reception ==
Professional ratings
Review scores
Source	Rating
Scene Point Blank	9/10 stars

The Scene Point Blank review by Kevin Fitzpatrick stated "Spruance is a noted perfectionist and as such, surrounds himself with great musicians he can count on to deliver the goods. This will always be a good thing and with Xaphan showcasing the likes of Tim Smolens and Ches Smith, you can pretty much guarantee an album of substance, worth, and beauty that has become a cornerstone of both Zorn and Spruances work throughout their career".

== Track listing ==
All tracks are written by John Zorn.

No.	Title	Length
1.	"Sheburiel"	5:43
2.	"Akramachamarei"	5:46
3.	"Shoel"	6:19
4.	"Barakiel"	5:49
5.	"Bezriel"	4:36
6.	"Kemuel"	4:23
7.	"Labbiel"	4:22
8.	"Asron"	3:32
9.	"Balberith"	6:31
10.	"Omael"	4:01
11.	"Hamaya"	4:20

== Personnel ==
- Trey Spruance — guitars (baritone guitar, electric guitar, bass guitar), piano, organ, percussion, autoharp, synthesizer, production, recording, mixing
- Anonymous 13 — voice, viola
- Chippy (Heung-Heung Chin) — design
- Rich Doucette — sarangi
- Timb Harris — violin, trumpet
- Scott Hull — audio mastering
- Shahzad Ismaily — bass guitar
- Jai Young Kim — B3 organ
- Justin Phelps — mixing
- Jason Schimmel — guitar, recording
- Monica Schley — harp
- Ches Smith — drums, congas
- Tim Smolens — cello, upright bass, recording
- Kazunori Sugiyama — associate producer
- Adam Stacey — clavinet
- Arun Venkatesh — recording
- Alex Eddings — Assistant Engineer
- John Zorn — executive producer
