= Clinton McKinnon =

Clinton McKinnon may refer to:

- Clinton McKinnon (musician)
- Clinton D. McKinnon, politician
