= The Story of Iceland =

Studio album by Eyvind Kang
- Released: 27 June 2000
- Genre: Experimental rock Avant-garde
- Length: 43:02
- Label: Tzadik

Professional ratings
Review scores
| Source | Rating |
|---|---|
| Allmusic | link |

The Story of Iceland is an album of modern chamber music in multiple styles by violinist and multi-instrumentalist Eyvind Kang, accompanied by a large ensemble that includes guitarist Bill Frisell.

== Track listing ==
1. "Story of Iceland: Circle of Fair Karma (Part 1)" (music: Kang) – 1:45
2. "Story of Iceland: Circle of Fair Karma (Part 2)" (music: Kang) – 15:07
3. "Story of Iceland: Sweetness of Candy" (music: Kang) – 3:06
4. "Story of Iceland: Hour of Fair Karma (Part 1)" (music: Kang) – 4:31
5. "Story of Iceland: Hour of Fair Karma (Part 2)" (music: Kang) – 6:07
6. "10:10 (The Beloved One)" (music: Kang) – 10:10
7. "Ayanamsha" (music: Kang) – 2:20

== Personnel ==
- Eyvind Kang – violin, multiple instruments
- Bill Frisell – guitar
- Lesli Dalaba – trumpet
- Courtney Agguire – vocals
- Keith Lowe – acoustic bass
- Jessica Lurie – flute
- Tucker Martine – drums
- Bär McKinnon – flute
- Paul Moore – cymbals
- Kala Ramnath – violin
- Evan Schiller – percussion
- Nancy Scranton – gamelan
- Philip White – Uilleann pipes
- Tim Young – guitar, vocals
