= John Whooley =

- Also known as: John Whoolilurie
- Occupation: Instrumentalist
- Instrument: Saxophone
- Member of: Santa Cruz Hemp Allstars
- Formerly of: Estradasphere

John Whooley (/ˈhuːli/ HOOLEE), now John Whoolilurie, is a California-based musician best known for playing the saxophone and other instruments with the band Estradasphere. In addition to performing, he also composed much of the band's music until he left the band to live in Joshua Tree, California.

Whooley was also a member of the "jam supergroup" Santa Cruz Hemp Allstars, put together by Santa Cruz promoter -- Poco Marshall. Other side projects include Phree Radicals, Netwerk: Electric and his soloproject, Whoolilicious. With his wife Moriah-Melin, he formed the band MoJoW and the Vibration Army. When performing live, the Army uses electronic looping pedals to layer multiple instruments or vocals in real time. MoJoW toured Europe in the summer of 2005, and released their first album, Undivided, later that year. They released their second record Work With What You Got in 2007 in the style of Saxappella (a cappella grooves and sax).

== Performing Discography ==
=== with Estradasphere ===
- It's Understood (LP) (2000)
- These Are The Days (VHS) (2000)
- The Silent Elk of Yesterday (EP) (2001)
- Buck Fever (LP) (2001)
- Quadropus (LP) (2003)
- Passion for Life (LP/DVD) (2004)
- These Are The Days (DVD Reissue) (2005)

=== as Whoolilicious ===
- Nuthin' but The Whooley (LP) (2002)

=== with MoJoW ===
- Undivided (LP) (2005)
- Work With What You Got (LP) (2007)
