= Clinton McKinnon (musician) =

American musician (born 1969)

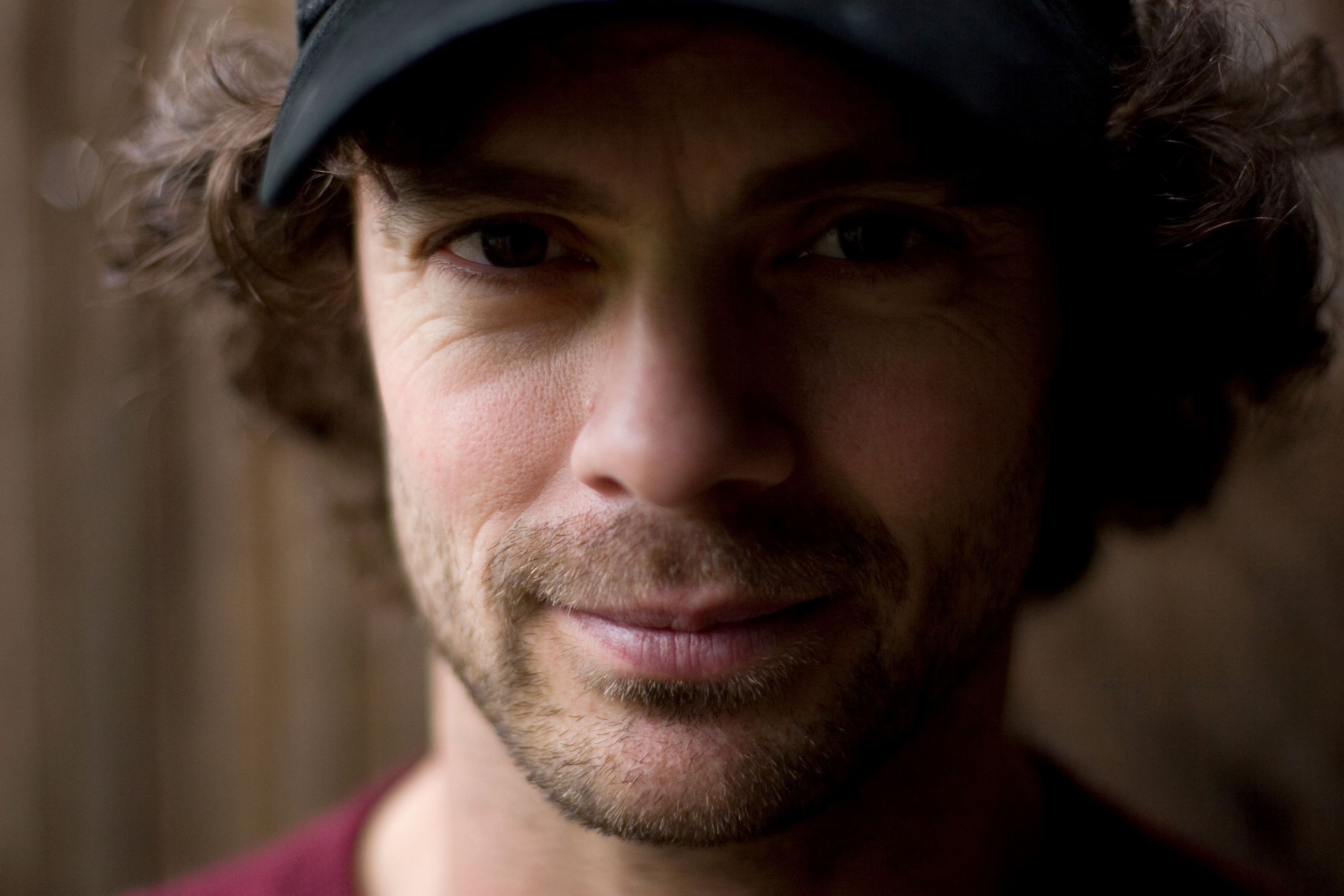

Background information
- Also known as: Bär McKinnon
- Born: December 24, 1969 (age 56)
- Genres: Experimental; experimental rock; avant-garde; pop; rock and roll; ska punk; heavy metal
- Occupation: Musician
- Instrument: Saxophone
- Years active: 1986–present
- Labels: Amphead; Romero Records
- Member of: Umlaut; High Castle Teleorkestra
- Formerly of: Mr. Bungle; Secret Chiefs 3

Clinton "Bär" McKinnon (born December 24, 1969) is an American musician, best known as a saxophonist in the experimental rock band Mr. Bungle. He is a member of the Australian group Umlaut and the remote musical ensemble High Castle Teleorkestra.

Bär, pronounced "bear", is a childhood nickname given to him by his older sisters. Bär studied music at Humboldt State University, where he met Trevor Dunn and Trey Spruance.

== Mr. Bungle, Secret Chiefs 3 ==
Bär joined Mr. Bungle in 1989 and remained with the band until their breakup in 2000. He was also a member of the experimental rock band Secret Chiefs 3 and has appeared on the Carl Hancock Rux record Rux Revue (1999) and Eyvind Kang's The Story of Iceland (2000), among others.

== Umlaut ==
After moving to Melbourne, Australia, Bär formed the experimental band Umlaut (also stylized as Umläut) in 2008. They released their debut, self-titled album the following year. They have since issued several more records, including To Your Poverty Quietly Go (2014), Arunachala (2019), Kintsugi (2019), and Desolë (2025). The band has accompanied the American comedian Neil Hamburger as well as Secret Chiefs 3 on their various tours in Australia.

== High Castle Teleorkestra ==
High Castle Teleorkestra is a remote music ensemble formed during the COVID-19 pandemic. The group name is a reference to the work of the science fiction writer Philip K. Dick.

== Discography ==
=== Bär ===
- Practice Liedown (2026)

=== Mr. Bungle ===
- OU818 (demo, 1989)
- Mr. Bungle (1991)
- Disco Volante (1995)
- California (1999)

=== Secret Chiefs 3 ===
- First Grand Constitution and Bylaws (1996)
- Hurqalya (Second Grand Constitution and Bylaws) (1998)
- Eyes of Flesh, Eyes of Flame (live, 1999)
- Book M (2001)

=== Umlaut ===
- Umlaut (2009)
- To Your Poverty Quietly Go (2014)
- Arunachala (2019)
- Kintsugi (2019)

=== High Castle Teleorkestra ===
- "Ich Bin's / The Days of Blue Jeans" (single, 2020)
- "Valisystem A / Klawpeels: Mission Checkup" (single, 2021)

=== Guest appearances ===
- Carl Hancock Rux – Rux Revue (1998)
- Melt-Banana – Charlie (1998) (with Mr. Bungle)
- Eyvind Kang – The Story of Iceland (2000)
- Glasfrosch – If You Go Far Enough into the Sky You'll Come Out Underwater (2011)
