= Secret Chiefs 3 =

American experimental rock band

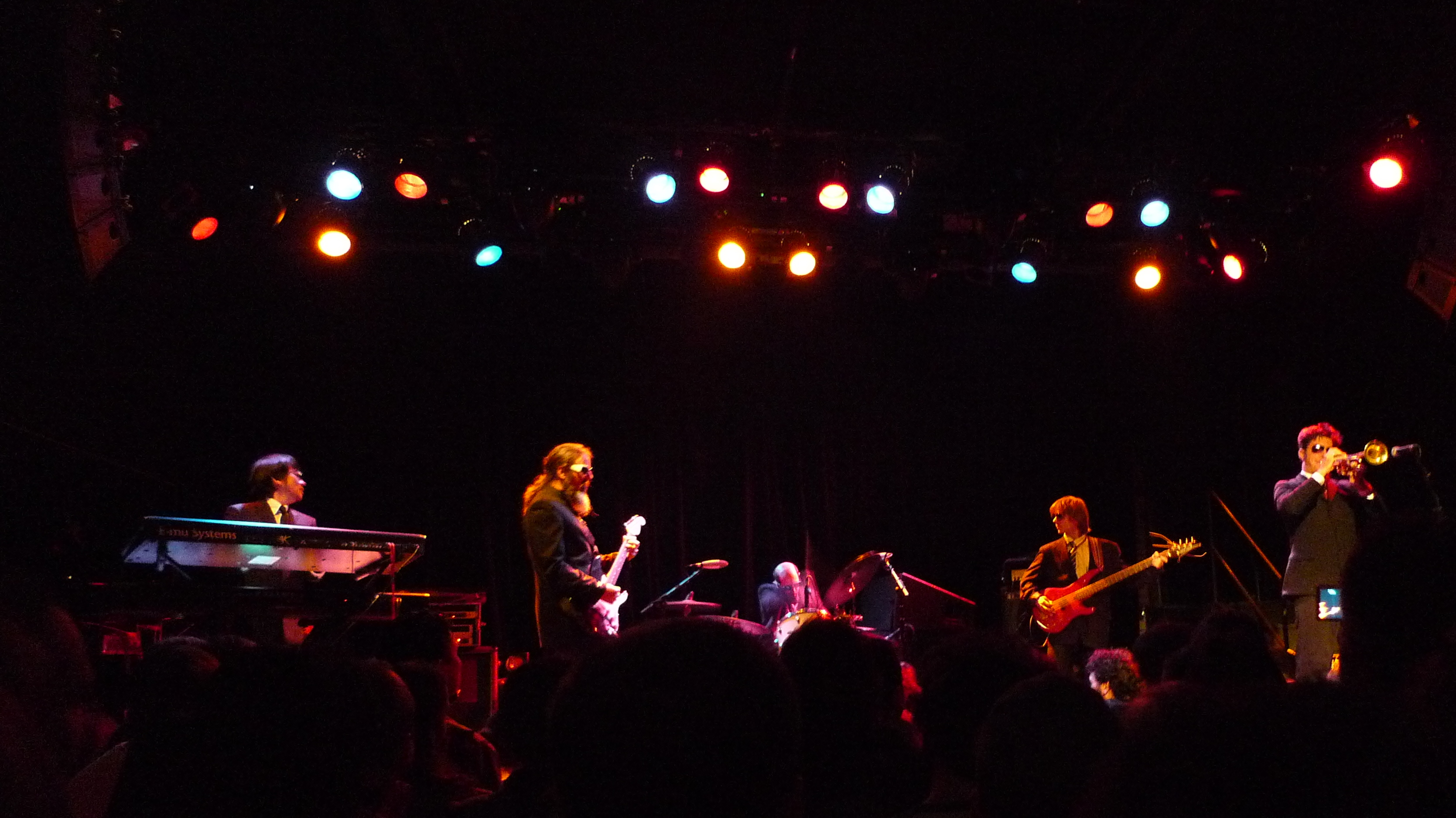
- Secret Chiefs 3 performing in 2009

Background information
- Origin: San Francisco, California, United States
- Genre: Experimental rock
- Years active: 1995–present
- Labels: Web of Mimicry; Amarillo
- Members: See "Band members"

Secret Chiefs 3 (or SC3) is an American experimental rock group led by guitarist/composer Trey Spruance (of Mr. Bungle and formerly of Faith No More). Their studio recordings and tours have featured different lineups, as the group performs a wide range of musical styles, mostly instrumental, including surf rock, Persian, neo-Pythagorean, Indian, death metal, film music, and electronic music.

The band's name is derived from the "Secret Chiefs" said to inspire and guide various esoteric and mystical groups of the previous two centuries. Spruance has expressed interest in, and drawn inspiration from, various mystical or occult systems such as Sufism, Kabbalah, Hermeticism, and alchemy.

== Satellite bands ==
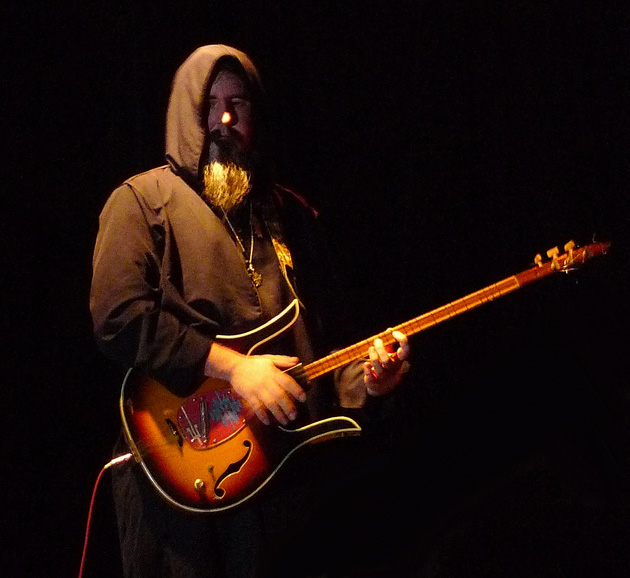
Trey Spruance performing in 2009

In 2007, it was announced that Secret Chiefs 3 has always been a general name for seven different bands, each representing a different aspect of Spruance's musical and philosophical interests. The seven bands are Electromagnetic Azoth, UR, Ishraqiyun, Traditionalists, Holy Vehm, FORMS, and NT Fan. Spruance has stated that the sound collages of Electromagnetic Azoth serve as the center of Secret Chiefs 3.

The albums Book of Horizons (2004) and Satellite Supersonic Vol. 1 (2010) were conceived as compilation albums featuring the satellite bands under their own names. All bands have appeared on at least one of these albums. Some satellite bands have also released records of their own. So far, five of the satellite bands have had tracks featured across a series of six 7" singles and Traditionalists and Ishraqiyun have delivered full-length albums.

== Band members ==
Spruance formed Secret Chiefs 3 in the mid-1990s with fellow Mr. Bungle members Trevor Dunn on bass and Danny Heifetz on drums. Some of the many musicians who have since recorded or toured with SC3 include violinist Eyvind Kang, percussionist William Winant, drummer Ches Smith, bassist Shahzad Ismaily, former Mr. Bungle members Clinton "Bär" McKinnon, oud, gimbre, and bass player Shanir Ezra Blumenkranz, and drummer Kenny Grohowski. Musicians tend to float in and out of SC3, so the concept of "current" and "former" members is not entirely applicable. Below is a list of past and present members, guests, and collaborators:

- Trey Spruance – guitars (electric guitar, bass guitar, baritone guitar, microtonal guitar, 12-string guitar, sympitar, Pythagorean guitar), keyboards (keyboard, electric piano, acoustic piano, tack piano, clavinet, organ, celesta), percussion (dumbek, shaker, tambourine, glockenspiel, daf, etc.), santur, rabab, banjo, mandolin, zither, tar, cümbüş, saz, carillon, dulcimer, autoharp, trumpet, sheng, synthesizer, sampler, programming, Foley sound effects, electroacoustic treatment, vocals
- Lucas Abela – power drill
- Dave Abramson — drums
- Laura Allen — vocals
- Anonymous 13 — viola, vocals
- Jennifer Cass — harp
- April Centrone – drums, percussion
- Matt Chamberlain — drums
- Paul Dal Porto — sitar
- Mike Dillon — vibraphone, tabla
- Rich Doucette – sarangi
- Toby Driver – bass guitar
- Trevor Dunn — bass guitar, vocals
- Phil Franklin – drums, percussion
- Lori Goldston — cello
- Kenny Grohowski – drums
- Timba Harris — violin, viola, trumpet
- Danny Heifetz — drums, percussion (riq, zill, tambourine, shaker, dumbek), trombone
- Kris Hendrickson — autoharp, vocals
- Bill Horist — prepared guitar
- Shahzad Ismaily — bass guitar, percussion (dhol, mridangam, ghatam, zil, etc.)
- Eyvind Kang – violin, viola, cello, erhu
- Fatima Khanoam – santur
- Jai Young Kim – keyboards, B3 organ
- Jessika Kenney – vocals
- Kevin Kmetz – shamisen
- Ursula Knudson – bowed saw
- Peژ Mon – drums
- John Wayne Law – bass guitar
- Matt Lebofsky – keyboards
- Joe Lester – bass guitar
- Clinton "Bär" McKinnon – saxophone, flute, keyboards, percussion
- John Merryman – drums
- Mike Patton – vocals
- KT Pierce – vocals
- Jesse Quattro – vocals
- Ryan Parrish – kaval, saxophones, concert flute
- Jason Schimmel — acoustic guitar, fuzz guitar, cümbüş mandolin, vocals
- Monica Schley – harp
- Shamou — percussion (darbuka, riq)
- Ches Smith – drums, congas
- Tim Smolens — bass guitar, upright bass, cello, contrabass, cello
- Adam Stacey – clavinet
- Hans Teuber — flute
- Gregg Turkington – vocals
- Unhuman – vocals
- William Winant — drums, percussion (frame drum, tabla, marimba, vibraphone, shaker, glockenspiel, gong, tubular bell, kanjira, timpani, cymbal, bell, zil, hammered dulcimer, etc.)

== Discography ==
This is a list of all releases by SC3 and its satellite bands. The column "artist" states under what name the recording is released, not who is credited with the individual songs. Some releases, like the album Book of Horizons, are noteworthy in this regard, because they are released under the name Secret Chiefs 3, but the tracks they contain are each credited to a satellite band, giving the release the appearance of a compilation album.

=== Studio albums ===
| Year | Title | Artist | Notes |
|---|---|---|---|
| 1996 | First Grand Constitution and Bylaws: Labels: Amarillo (1996), Web of Mimicry (2000) | Secret Chiefs 3 | |
| 1998 | Hurqalya (Second Grand Constitution and Bylaws): Labels: Amarillo (1998), Web of Mimicry (2000) | Secret Chiefs 3 | |
| 2001 | Book M: Label: Web of Mimicry | Secret Chiefs 3 | |
| 2004 | Book of Horizons: Label: Web of Mimicry | Secret Chiefs 3 | First part of the Book of Truth trilogy Individual tracks are credited to the satellite bands |
| 2008 | Xaphan: Book of Angels Volume 9: Label: Tzadik | Secret Chiefs 3 | Arrangements from John Zorn's second Masada songbook |
| 2009 | Le Mani Destre Recise Degli Ultimi Uomini: Label: Web of Mimicry | Traditionalists | |
| 2013 | Book of Souls: Folio A: Label: Web of Mimicry | Secret Chiefs 3 | Second part of the Book of Truth trilogy Some individual tracks are credited to the satellite bands |
| 2014 | Perichoresis: Label: Web of Mimicry | Ishraqiyun | The satellite band's full-length album |
| 2018 | Malkhut: Label: Tzadik | Secret Chiefs 3 | Arrangements from John Zorn's Masada Book Three – "Book Beri'ah" |

=== Live albums ===
| Year | Title | Artist | Notes |
|---|---|---|---|
| 1999 | Eyes of Flesh, Eyes of Flame: Label: Web of Mimicry | Secret Chiefs 3 | Recording of a live performance at Slims in San Francisco on August 18, 1998 |

=== Compilations ===
| Year | Title | Notes | |
|---|---|---|---|
| 2007 | Path of Most Resistance: Label: Web of Mimicry | Secret Chiefs 3 | Compilation of previously released tracks The last three songs had not been released on any other Secret Chiefs 3 album |
| 2010 | Satellite Supersonic Vol. 1: Label: Web of Mimicry | Secret Chiefs 3 | Compilation of previously released 7" singles, re-recordings, and new material Individual tracks are credited to the satellite bands |
| 2020 | Horrorthon | Secret Chiefs 3 | |

=== DVDs ===
| Year | Title | Artist | Notes |
|---|---|---|---|
| 2009 | Live at the Great American Music Hall: Label: Web of Mimicry | Secret Chiefs 3 | Recording of a live performance at the Great American Music Hall in San Francisco on June 3, 2007 |

=== Singles and EPs ===
| Year | Title | Artist(s) | Notes |
|---|---|---|---|
| 1995 | The Legendary Paper Project: Label: Warner Bros. | Secret Chiefs 3 / Mr. Bungle | Split 7" promo including Mr. Bungle's "Platypus" Packaged with US vinyl copies of Mr. Bungle's Disco Volante LP |
| 1998 | The Theatrum of Suprasensory Universes Vol. 1: Label: Amarillo | Secret Chiefs 3 | Live EP with material from Australia tour |
| 1998 | Zulfikar II / Zulfikar III: Label: Web of Mimicry | Secret Chiefs 3 | |
| 2007 | The Left Hand of Nothingness / Personnae: Halloween: Label: Web of Mimicry | The Electromagnetic Azoth / UR | |
| 2007 | Balance of the 19 / Ubik: Label: Web of Mimicry | Ishraqiyun / The Electromagnetic Azoth | |
| 2007 | Kulturvultur / Drive: Label: Web of Mimicry | UR | |
| 2007 | Circumambulation / Labyrinth of Light: Label: Web of Mimicry | UR | |
| 2011 | Saptarshi / Radar: Label: Web of Mimicry | Ishraqiyun / FORMS | |
| 2012 | La Chanson de Jacky / The Western Exile: Label: Web of Mimicry | Traditionalists | |
| 2014 | Medium Aevum / Stars and Stripes Forever: Label: Web of Mimicry | UR / FORMS | |
| 2014 | Apocryphon of Jupiter / Danse Macabre: Label: Web of Mimicry | FORMS featuring the Golden State Theater Mighty Wurlitzer | |
| 2016 | Telstar / The New Daylight (Welcome to the Theatron Animatronique): Label: Web of Mimicry | UR | Web-only release |
| 2017 | THE SYSTEM OF ANTICHRIST / Bereshith: Label: Web of Mimicry | Traditionalists / Ishraqiyun | Web-only release |
| 2017 | MUSICA PRACTICA *Geek Pack One*: Bereshith: Label: Web of Mimicry | Ishraqiyun | Web-only release (alternative mixes and instrument stems) |
| 2017 | Danse Macabre Superdeluxe: Label: Web of Mimicry | FORMS | Web-only release (alt arrangements) |
