= Timba Harris =

American musician (born 1977)

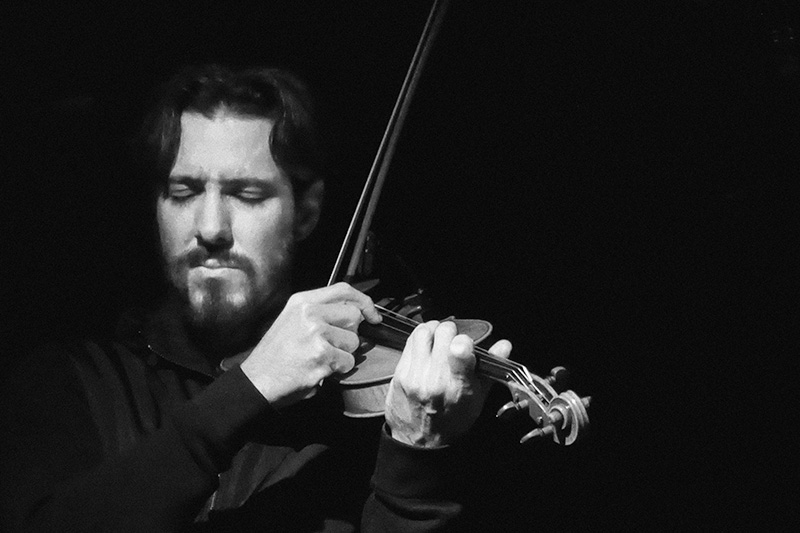
- Timba Harris in Aarhus, Denmark 2017

Background information
- Born: Timothy Bruce Harris; 21 September 1977 (age 48); Burbank
- Genres: Experimental rock; Contemporary classical; Progressive rock
- Occupations: Composer, performer
- Instruments: Violin, viola, trumpet, guitar
- Labels: Tzadik, Mimicry
- Member of: Secret Chiefs 3, Ultraphauna, Alora Crucible, Extra Life, Probosci (with Gyan Riley)
- Formerly of: Estradasphere
- Website: http://www.timbaharris.com

Timba Harris (born September 21, 1977) is a violinist, violist, trumpet player, and composer. He is an active touring and recording member of Secret Chiefs 3, Extra Life, and Alora Crucible; a founding member of the bands Ultraphauna and Estradasphere; and one half of the electroacoustic chamber duo Probosci. His large ensemble works have been recorded for John Zorn's Tzadik Records, and his playing and orchestral arrangements can be found on recordings throughout the experimental rock world and on video games and film. Harris has performed in theaters, halls, clubs, and festivals in over 45 countries throughout North America, South America, Europe, the Middle East, Asia, and Australia. He has been based in several locations during his career, including Los Angeles, Santa Cruz, Seattle, New York, England, and France.

== Biography ==
=== Early life ===
Timothy "Timba" Bruce Harris was born in 1977 in Burbank, California. During his childhood and teenage years, he studied and performed classical music, percussion, wind ensemble music and played iconic rock clubs on the Sunset Strip in Hollywood with his heavy metal band Insanity.

From 1995 to 2000, he attended the University of California, Santa Cruz, studying trumpet performance and violin performance, the latter under Roy Malan. Here he formed the band Estradasphere with schoolmates, which became his first international touring ensemble and led to working relationships with the larger professional worlds of contemporary classical music, avant-garde jazz, and experimental rock.

=== Bands and ensembles ===
Timba Harris is a longtime multi-instrumentalist in Trey Spruance's musical exploration into mysticism, Secret Chiefs 3, an offshoot of Mr. Bungle. Since performing with the band during a US tour with Harris's band Estradasphere in the summer of 2000, he has been a perpetual presence on Secret Chiefs 3's recordings and in performances, including the Xaphan: Book of Angels Volume 9 ensemble, which performs and records interpretations of John Zorn's Masada music.

Estradasphere, formed in 1999, toured the US and Europe during the 2000s. They released several recordings and movies on Mimicry Records and The End Records before disbanding in 2009. In 2007, the band met Amanda Palmer (of the Dresden Dolls) and collaborated on Palmer's projects including her 2007 album Who Killed Amanda Palmer and her duo with Jason Webley, Evelyn Evelyn, culminating in an invite-only, multi-day live performance at the band's Seattle compound.

Harris's work, beginning in the mid-2000s, with composer and guitarist Gyan Riley (son of the American composer Terry Riley) in the Gyan Riley Trio, first with drummer Scott Amendola and then Ches Smith, led to an enduring musical relationship with Riley, which in 2014 became a duo named Probosci. The duo, comprised of Harris and Riley, composes pieces for each other, which are then performed electro-acoustically on violin and classical/electric guitar. Since 2014, the group has performed throughout North America, South America, and Europe, and released their first recording, Time to Feed, on Mimicry Records.

After becoming involved with the New York Arabic Orchestra in 2012, both as a performer and an administrator, Harris subsequently formed Arabic/rock fusion band Al Madar with the NYAO's directors, Lebanese multi-instrumentalist Basam Saba and percussionist April Centrone. Al Madar has performed at the Beirut Jazz Festival in Lebanon, the Sines Festival Músicas do Mundo in Portugal, and Joe's Pub in Manhattan.

=== Other work as a performer ===
Timba Harris has appeared frequently with the contemporary music ensemble New Music Works in Santa Cruz, California. As "guest artist" and "featured artist," he has performed NMW director Phil Collins live music scores for Metropolis and Nosferatu, as well as the world premiere of Harris's own composition, neXus I: Cascadia with the New Music Works ensemble and the Ariose Singers.

Harris toured and recorded with the Seattle-based band led by Randall Dunn, Master Musicians of Bukkake, during their Totem Trilogy era (2009-2011).

=== Solo work / composition styles ===
Timba Harris's composition neXus I: Cascadia (2011), for choir and electroacoustic instrumental ensemble, is a "musical representation of the natural environment of the Pacific Northwest with a focus on transitional processes." The musical narrative focuses on the life cycle of the monarch butterfly, the seasonal behavior of the black bear, and the eruption of Mount Saint Helens. The 45-minute piece is a set of compositions and controlled improvisations informed by data concerning the subject matter and recorded and composed in a back-and-forth process that defined the ultimate musical result. The choral movements were recorded by the 85-member CSULB University Choir under the baton of Dr. Jonathan Talberg.

Harris other compositional and playing styles make use of elements of Arabic, Romanian, contemporary classical, and rock music. An essay written by Harris on this subject was published in John Zorn's Arcana III: Musicians on Music (2008).

Timba Harris composes and records solo, chamber, and large ensemble collaborations with other artists such as Eyvind Kang, Stephen O'Malley (Ensemble Pearl) and Grails.

=== Other recordings ===
As a session musician and performer, Harris has also contributed to composers' work such as John Zorn, Peter Garland, Eyvind Kang, and Toby Driver. He appears on recordings by Mr. Bungle, Amanda Palmer, and several projects produced by Randall Dunn, including albums by Wolves in the Throne Room and Sunn O))). He also provided the violin and trumpet performances on the soundtracks for the popular Valve video games Left 4 Dead 2 and Team Fortress 2.

== Discography ==
=== Timba Harris ===
- neXus I: Cascadia (Tzadik Records, 2012)

=== Probosci ===
- Time to Feed (Mimicry Records, 2014)

=== Secret Chiefs 3 ===
- Ishraqiyun: Perichoresis (Mimicry Records, 2014)
- FORMS: Apocryphon of Jupiter / Danse Macabre (Mimicry, 2014)
- UR: Medium Aevum / FORMS: Stars and Stripes Forever (Mimicry, 2014)
- Book of Souls: Folio A (Mimicry, 2013)
- La Chanson de Jacky / The Western Exile (Mimicry, 2012)
- Satellite Supersonic Vol. 1 (Mimicry, 2010)
- Traditionalists: Le Mani Destre Recise Degli Ultimi Uomini]] (Mimicry, 2009)
- DVD: Live at the Great American Music Hall (Mimicry, 2009)
- Xaphan: Book of Angels Volume 9 (Tzadik, 2008)
- Ishraqiyun: Balance of the 19 (Mimicry, 2007)
- Electromagnetic Azoth: The Left Hand of Nothingness (Mimicry, 2007)
- Path of Most Resistance (Mimicry, 2007)
- Book of Horizons (Mimicry, 2004)
- Book M (Mimicry, 2001)

=== Estradasphere ===
- The Pegasus Vault EP (Lobefood, 2008)
- DVD: Palace of Mirrors Live (the End Records, 2007)
- Palace of Mirrors (the End, 2006)
- DVD: These are the Days (2005)
- DVD: Passion for Life (Mimicry, 2004)
- Quadropus (Mimicry, 2003)
- Buck Fever (Mimicry, 2001)
- The Silent Elk of Yesterday (Mimicry, 2001)
- It's Understood (Mimicry, 2000)

=== With others ===
- Extra Life, The Sacred Vowel (Last Things, 2024)
- Alora Crucible, Oak Lace Apparition (2024)
- Ultraphauna, No No No No (2023)
- Alora Crucible, Thymiamatascension (House of Mythology, 2021)
- Atomic Ape, Swarm (Mimicry, 2014)
- Toby Driver, Ichneumonidae (2014)
- Grails, Black Tar Prophecies Vol. 4, 5, and 6 (Temporary Residence, 2013)
- Ensemble Pearl, Ensemble Pearl (Drag City, 2012)
- Eyvind Kang, Grass (Tzadik, 2012)
- Eyvind Kang, Visible Breath (Ideologic Organ, 2012)
- Master Musicians of Bukakke, Totem 3 (Important Records, 2011)
- Grails, Deep Politics (Temporary Residence Limited, 2011)
- Wolves in the Throne Room, Celestial Lineage (Southern Lord, 2011)
- Cave Singers, No Witch (JagJaguwar Records, 2011)
- Mamiffer, Mare Decendrii (Conspiracy Records, 2011)
- Jason Webley, In This Light: Live at Bear Creek (11 Records, 2011)
- Master Musicians of Bukakke, Totem 2 (Important, 2010)
- Grails, Black Tar Prophecies Volume 4 (Important, 2010)
- Evelyn Evelyn, Evelyn Evelyn (8 Ft. Records / 11 Records, 2010)
- Master Musicians of Bukakke, Totem 1 (Conspiracy Records, 2009)
- Sunn O))), Monoliths & Dimensions (Southern Lord, 2009)
- Orange Tulip Conspiracy, Orange Tulip Conspiracy (Mimicry, 2008)
- Thanato/Schizo, Zoom Code (My Kingdom Music, 2008)
- Vladimir Bozar 'n' ze Sheraf Orkestar, Universal Sprache (Imago Records, 2008)
- Peter Garland, Love Songs (Tzadik, 2005)
- Impaled, Death After Life (Century Media, 2005)
- Tuna Helpers, I'll Have What She's Having (Mimicry, 2005)
- ISS, Forget About the Girl (Mimicry, 2002)
- Mr. Bungle, California (Warner Brothers, 1999)
- Igorrr, "Blastbeat Falafel", (Metal Blade Records, 2025)

=== Film ===
- Starslyderz (Funny Farm Films / Java Bob Films, 2005)
- Queen of the Sun: What are the Bees Telling Us? (Lush Mechanique Music, 2011)

=== Video games ===
- Left 4 Dead 2 (Valve, 2009)
- Team Fortress 2 (Valve, 2009)
