= Estradasphere =

American experimental band

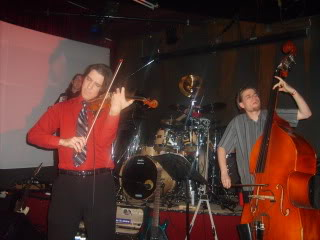
- Estradasphere performing in 2007

Background information
- Origin: Santa Cruz, California, United States; Seattle, Washington, United States (now)
- Genres: Experimental rock Experimental metal
- Years active: 1998–2008
- Labels: The End; Mimicry
- Past members: Band members

Estradasphere was an American experimental rock band that originated in Santa Cruz, California, during the late 1990s. The band, which in its last incarnation was based in Seattle, consisted of six multi-instrumentalists from a variety of musical backgrounds trained in disciplines ranging from classical music and jazz to heavy metal.

In November 2007, members of Estradasphere started touring with Amanda Palmer of The Dresden Dolls, as well as helping to produce her debut solo album Who Killed Amanda Palmer.

The band has been on a "permanent hiatus" since 2010.

== Music ==
Estradasphere were influenced by many different artists from many different subgenres, such as jazz, funk, techno, classical music, pop, heavy metal, New Age, Latin, Balkan, klezmer, Greek and Romani. They were influenced by artists such as The Beach Boys and Secret Chiefs 3, and have been compared to Mr. Bungle, Frank Zappa and John Zorn. Similarly to Mr. Bungle and Secret Chiefs 3, the band mixes several genres in its songs. The band was a self-proclaimed inventor of bizarre genres such as "Bulgarian Surf", "Romanian Gypsy-Metal", and "Spaghetti Eastern" and sounded like "Psychedelic-Sci-fi", "Gypsy-Metal-Jazz" and "Epic-Cinema-Thon", according to its MySpace.

In 1997, members of the group released an avant-garde metal album called Koolaide Moustache in Jonestown under the name Don Salsa.

== Band members ==
Final line-up

- Tim Smolens – standup bass, electric bass, vocals, audio production/engineering
- Timba Harris – violin, trumpet, mandolin, guitar, vocals
- Jason Schimmel – guitar, keyboards, banjo, vocals
- Lee Smith – drums
- Kevin Kmetz – tsugaru shamisen, guitar, keyboards
- Adam Stacey – accordion, keyboards, vocals

Previous members

- David Murray – drums
- John Whooley – saxophone, accordion, vocals

== Discography ==
Studio albums

- It's Understood (2000)
- Buck Fever (2001)
- Quadropus (2003)
- Palace of Mirrors (2006)

Extended plays

- The Silent Elk of Yesterday (2001)
- The Pegasus Vault (2008)

Live albums

- These are the Days (2000)
- Passion for Life (2004)
- These are the Days (2005)
- Palace of Mirrors - Live (2007)
