= Jason Schimmel =

American musician (born 1978)

- Born: Jason Aaron Schimmel; 30 June 1978 (age 48); Los Angeles
- Genres: Experimental rock; Progressive Rock; Avant Garde; Jazz
- Occupations: Composer, Performer, Recording Engineer, Producer
- Instruments: Guitar, Piano, Bouzouki, Banjo, Mandolin, Vocals, Bass,
- Labels: Tzadik, Mimicry, The End Records
- Website: http://www.jasonschimmel.com

Jason Schimmel (born June 30, 1978) is an American composer, guitarist, musician, recording engineer and producer from Los Angeles, California. He is a founding member of the bands Estradasphere, Red Fiction (formerly known as Atomic Ape), and Orange Tulip Conspiracy. He is an active member in Trey Spruance's Secret Chiefs 3. He has also performed with John Zorn's Masada, J.G. Thirlwell, Neil Hamburger, Amanda Palmer, Michael White, Eyvind Kang, Wayne Horvitz and Jason Webley.

== Discography ==
=== Estradasphere ===
- The Pegasus Vault EP (2008) Lobefood
- DVD: Palace of Mirrors Live (2007) the End Records
- Palace of Mirrors (2006) the End Records
- DVD: These are the Days (2005)
- DVD: Passion for Life (2004) Mimicry Records
- Quadropus (2003) Mimicry Records
- Buck Fever (2001) Mimicry Records
- The Silent Elk of Yesterday (2001) Mimicry Records
- It's Understood (2000) Mimicry Records

=== Secret Chiefs 3 ===
- Ishraqiyun: Perichoresis (2014) Mimicry Records
- Book of Souls: Folio A (2013) Mimicry Records
- La Chanson de Jacky / The Western Exile (2012) Mimicry Records
- Traditionalists: Le Mani Destre Recise Degli Ultimi Uomini (2009) Mimicry Records
- Xaphan: Book of Angels Volume 9 (2008) Tzadik Records
- Path of Most Resistance (2007) Mimicry Records
- Book of Horizons (2004) Mimicry Records
- Book M (2001) Mimicry Records

=== Atomic Ape ===
- Swarm (2014) Mimicry Records
- Rampage 7" (2014) Mimicry Records

=== Red Fiction ===
- Visions of the Void (2020) Tzadik

=== Other ===
- Orange Tulip Conspiracy Orange Tulip Conspiracy (2008) Mimicry Records
- Amanda Palmer Theatre Is Evil (2012) 8 Ft. Records
- Amanda Palmer Who Killed Amanda Palmer (2008) Roadrunner Records
- Vladimir Bozar 'n' ze Sharaf Orkestar Universal Sprache (2008) Imago Records
- Evelyn Evelyn Evelyn Evelyn (2010) 8 Ft. Records, 11 Records
- Neil Hamburger First of Dismay (2014) Drag City
- Foetus Soak (2013) Ectopic Ents
- Colette Hypnotized (2005) OM Records

=== Film ===
- Walk-ins Welcome (2012) Rojée Crumbe Films Inc
