= Danny Heifetz =

American musician

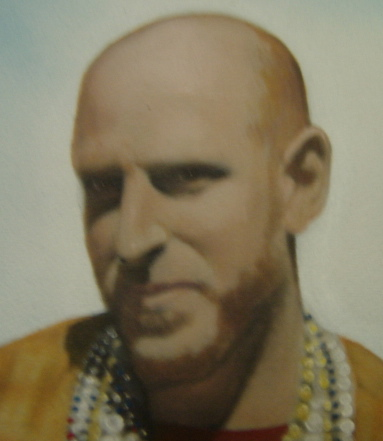
- Danny Heifetz, circa 1998

Background information
- Also known as: I Quit, 26Valencia, AtlasFace, Back-It-Up Dan
- Born: Daniel Mark Heifetz; April 17, 1964 (age 62); New York, NY
- Genres: Experimental rock, country, jazz, avant-garde metal
- Occupations: Musician, teacher
- Instruments: Drums, percussion, trumpet, piano, guitar
- Years active: 1981–present

Danny Heifetz (born April 17, 1964) is an American musician who is perhaps best known for being the drummer for American experimental rock group, Mr. Bungle from 1989, until their disbandment in 2000. Heifetz also plays trumpet, guitar, bass and piano and currently teaches music lessons in Sydney, Australia. He is the grandson of the late violinist Jascha Heifetz.

== Played with ==
- Embryo (with Ryan Mallory)
- Snowblind (with Blair Hatch and Hector Nunez)
- Persuasion (with Matt Johnson, Gregor Verbinski and BlairH)
- The Drivers (1981–1983; with GregorV, John Thum, RyanM and Rick MacDonald)
- The Cylon Boys Choir (1981–1982; with John Nau, Gerald Gates, Michael Cronin, Andrew Harvey, John Hench and GV)
- Barn (1987–1988; same minus MW)
- Mr. Bungle (1989–2000)
- Dieselhed (1989–2000)
- Link Wray (1997–2002)
- Merle Morris (2004–2007)
- Umlaut (2022-present)
- Close to Forever (2016-2025)
- Gate E (2012-2023)

== Currently active ==
- Godswounds
- Neil Hamburger and the Hungry Man Band
- Old Man River
- Secret Chiefs 3 (most recently on Winter 2012 U.S. West Coast Tour)
- The Curse of Company
- The Exiles
- The Tango Saloon
- Virgil Shaw
- Umlaut

== Collaborations ==
- Andrew Covell
- Badly Drawn Boy
- Corduroy
- Darren Stratti
- Jason Stratti
- Delia Obst
- Granfaloon Bus
- Harry Vanda
- John Paul Young
- Nations by the River
- Paul Greig
- Phillip Johnston
- Plainfield (band)
- Robi DelMar
- The Cutters
- The Holy Soul
- Youth Group
- Zip Code Rapists
- Schlongbutter

== Personal life ==
As of September, 2013, he lives back in Sydney, Australia (after spending 2011 in the US). Grandson of Jascha Heifetz.
