= Trey Spruance =

American musician and composer (born 1969)

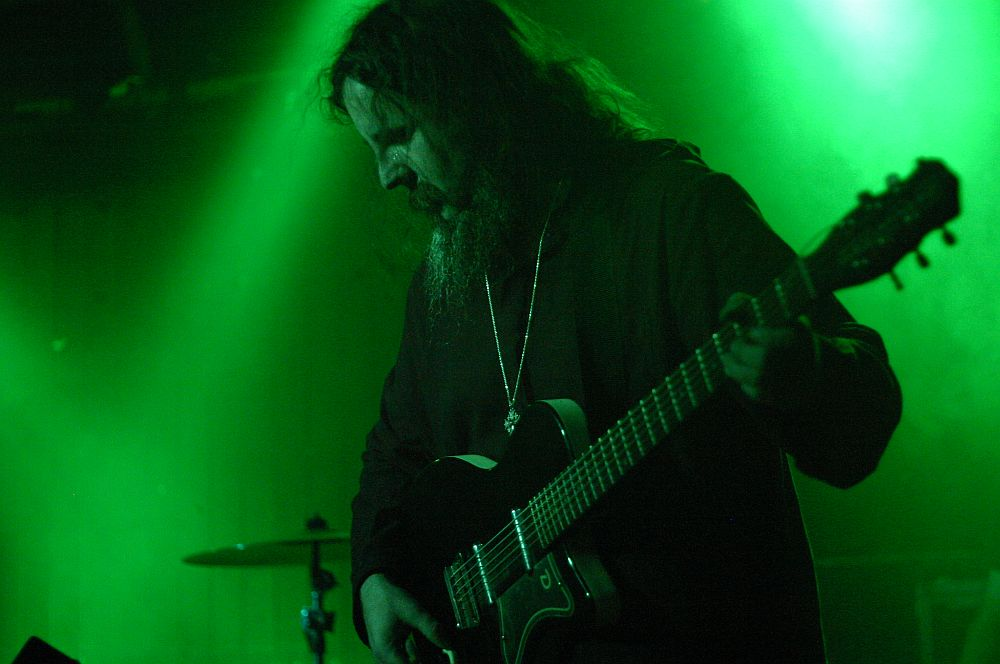
- Spruance performing in 2008

Background information
- Born: Preston Lea Spruance III; August 14, 1969 (age 56); Eureka, California, U.S.
- Genres: Avant-garde metal, experimental music, alternative metal, experimental rock, ska
- Occupation: Musician
- Instruments: Guitar, keyboards, synthesizer, bağlama, rabab, dumbek, zither, bass guitar, pipa, trumpet, vocals
- Years active: 1985–present
- Label: Web of Mimicry

Preston Lea "Trey" Spruance III (born August 14, 1969) is an American composer, producer, and musician who co-founded the experimental rock band Mr. Bungle. He is also leader of the multi-genre outfit Secret Chiefs 3. Originally a guitarist and trumpeter, in the early 1990s Spruance began playing vintage electronic organs, analog synthesizers, saz, santur, electric sitar, tar, and various other string and percussion instruments. In the mid 1990s he founded Forking Paths Studio where his production techniques were applied to Mr. Bungle and Secret Chiefs 3 records among many others. Since 2007, Spruance's Secret Chiefs 3 has been a very active live entity, performing well over 500 shows in more than 50 countries.

Spruance's playing and composition style is influenced by many diverse genres of music, such as surf rock, Anatolian folk, death metal, film music, Afghan rebab music, ska, funk, space rock, jazz and Japanoise. Musique concrète and foley work also play a large role in his recordings.

== Career ==
Spruance was a founding member of Mr. Bungle, along with Mike Patton and Trevor Dunn. He has focused on his band Secret Chiefs 3 for the last 15 years (though it began in 1996), and its seven "satellite" groups first introduced on the 2004 album Book of Horizons. Though once secular, Spruance began exploring religious and philosophical themes in Mr. Bungle and Secret Chiefs 3 in the mid-1990s, after joining the Eastern Orthodox Church.

In 2013, he arranged his music for the 61-piece Traditional Russian Orchestra of Krasnoyarsk and performed with them in Kansk, Siberia, alongside other members of Secret Chiefs 3. He has performed regularly with John Zorn and has arranged two releases of works from Zorn's Masada Songbooks for Secret Chiefs 3: "Xaphan" in 2007, and "Beriah". He contributed guitar and tubular bells to two albums by the drone metal band Asva, with whom he toured the US and Europe. He also recorded with Patton and Faith No More on their 1995 album King for a Day... Fool for a Lifetime.

In 2016, Spruance composed a three movement string quartet titled "Séraphîta" for San Francisco's Kronos Quartet. The piece was premiered by Kronos at the Haydnsaal at Schloss Esterházy in Vienna, and at SFJAZZ Center in the USA. Kronos has also performed the piece at Carnegie Hall and for an engagement with the Alonzo King LINES Ballet. In Australia "Séraphîta" has been performed by the Black Square String Quartet.

== As a producer ==
Besides his own bands, Spruance has also worked as a producer for others. In 2020 he produced "Alphaville" for NYC avant garde black metal group Imperial Triumphant, and is currently producing their next record. He produced the album Death After Life for Oakland, CA death metal group Impaled. Production duties for other bands include Neil Hamburger, Dengue Fever, The Tuna Helpers, Faxed Head, Tub Ring and many others.

== Record label ==
Spruance is the founder of Web of Mimicry, which has released albums from a variety of different bands, including Cleric, Fat32, Sleepytime Gorilla Museum, Brazzaville, Matt Chamberlain, Dengue Fever, and ASVA, amongst others.

== Discography ==
=== Mr. Bungle ===
- The Raging Wrath of the Easter Bunny (1986)
- Bowel of Chiley (1987)
- Goddammit I Love America! (1988)
- OU818 (1989)
- Mr. Bungle (1991)
- Disco Volante (1995)
- California (1999)
- The Raging Wrath of the Easter Bunny Demo (2020)

=== Secret Chiefs 3 ===
- First Grand Constitution and Bylaws (1996)
- Second Grand Constitution and Bylaws: Hurqalya (1998)
- Eyes of Flesh, Eyes of Flame (1999)
- Book M (2001)
- Book of Horizons (2004)
- Path of Most Resistance (retrospective and rarities album) (2007)
- Xaphan: Book of Angels Volume 9 (2008)
- Traditionalists: Le Mani Destre Recise Degli Ultimi Uomini (2009)
- Satellite Supersonic Vol. 1 (2010)
- Book of Souls: Folio A (2013)
- "Perichoresis" (2014)

=== Faxed Head ===
- Uncomfortable But Free (1995)
- Exhumed at Birth (1997)
- Chiropractic (2001)

=== Faith No More ===
- King for a Day... Fool for a Lifetime (1995)

=== Weird Little Boy ===
- Weird Little Boy (1998)

== Band membership ==
- Secret Chiefs 3
- Mr. Bungle
- Faxed Head (as "Neck Head")
- Noddingturd Fan (also NT Fan)
- Scourge
- Asva
- The Three Doctors Band
- Plainfield
- The Bon Larvis Band
- Faith No More
