= Web of Mimicry =

- Founded: 1998
- Founder: Trey Spruance
- Distributor: Revolver USA (US)
- Genre: Avant-rock, experimental, instrumental
- Country of origin: United States
- Location: San Francisco, California
- Official website: Official Site

Web of Mimicry is an independent record label based in San Francisco, California, specializing in avant-rock, experimental, and instrumental music. Founded in 1998 by guitarist Trey Spruance of Mr. Bungle and Secret Chiefs 3, the label serves as the primary home for Secret Chiefs 3 while supporting a roster of like-minded artists.

== History ==
Web of Mimicry was established by Spruance in 1998 as an outlet for experimental music projects from the Bay Area, building on his work with Mr. Bungle and Secret Chiefs 3. Known for blending rock, jazz, electronic, and world music, the label operates independently and has been described as existing on the "outskirts of the music industry."

It distributes music digitally via Bandcamp and physically through partners like Midheaven Mailorder. Notable releases include the 2004 compilation Satellite Supersonic Vol. 1 and Secret Chiefs 3’s multimedia project "Theatron Animatronique."

== Roster ==
- ASVA
- Brazzaville
- Matt Chamberlain
- Cleric
- Danubius
- Dengue Fever
- Estradasphere
- Faxed Head
- Free Salamander Exhibit
- Miasma & the Carousel of Headless Horses
- Sir Millard Mulch
- Secret Chiefs 3
- The Stares
- The Tuna Helpers
- The Youngs

== Discography ==
Artist	Title	Year	Format	Catalog No.
Secret Chiefs 3	Zulfikar II/Zulfikar III	1998	7"	WoM 001
Secret Chiefs 3	Eyes Of Flesh Eyes Of Flame	1999	CD	WoM 002
Secret Chiefs 3	First Grand Constitution and Bylaws	2000	CD/LP	WoM 003
Secret Chiefs 3	Hurqalya (Second Grand Constitution and Bylaws)	2000	CD/LP	WoM 004
Estradasphere	It's Understood	2000	CD	WoM 005
Secret Chiefs 3	Book M	2001	CD/LP	WoM 006
Faxed Head	Chiropractic	2000	CD	WoM 007
Estradasphere	Buck Fever	2001	CD	WoM 008
Estradasphere	The Silent Elk Of Yesterday	2001	CD	WoM 009
Danubius	Danubius	2003	CD	WoM 010
I.S.S.	Forget About The Girl	2002	CD	WoM 011
Dengue Fever	Dengue Fever	2003	CD	WoM 012
Estradasphere	Quadropus	2003	CD	WoM 013
Secret Chiefs 3	Book of Horizons	2004	CD	WoM 014
Estradasphere	Passion For Life	2004	DVD/CD	WoM 015
Brazzaville	Welcome To... Brazzaville	2004	CD	WoM 017
The Youngs	The Youngs	2004	CD	WoM 018
Sleepytime Gorilla Museum	Of Natural History	2004	CD	WoM 019
The Tuna Helpers	I'll Have What She's Having	2004	CD	WoM 020
Asva	Futurist's Against The Ocean	2005	CD	WoM 021
The Stares	Spine To Sea	2005	CD	WoM 022
Sir Millard Mulch	How To Sell The Whole Fucking Universe To Everybody...Once And For All!	2005	CD	WoM 023
Fishtank	Super Raoul	2005	CD	WoM 024
Miasma & The Carousel Of Headless Horses	Perils	2005	CD	WoM 025
Matt Chamberlain	Matt Chamberlain	2005	CD	WoM 026
Secret Chiefs 3	Path Of Most Resistance	2007	CD	WoM 027
Secret Chiefs 3: Traditionalists	Le Mani Destre Recise Degli Ultimi Uomini	2009	CD/LP	WoM 028
The Electromagnetic Azoth/UR	The Left Hand Of Nothingness/Personnae: Halloween	2007	7"	WoM 029
Ishraqiyun/The Electromagnetic Azoth	Balance Of The 19/UBIK	2007	7"	WoM 030
UR	Kulturvultur/Drive	2007	7"	WoM 031
UR	Circumambulation/Labyrinth Of Light	2007	7"	WoM 032
Girth	Sleeper, Awaken!	2007	CD	WoM 033
Faxed Head	From Coalinga To Osaka (Live In Japan 1995)	2008	DVD	WoM 034
Orange Tulip Conspiracy	Orange Tulip Conspiracy	2008	CD	WoM 035
Secret Chiefs 3	Live At The Great American Music Hall 2007	2009	DVD	WoM 036
Good For Cows	Audumla	2010	CD	WoM 037
Cleric	Regressions	2010	CD	WoM 038
Secret Chiefs 3	Satellite Supersonic Vol. 1	2010	CD	WoM 039
Ishraqiyun/Forms	Saptarshi/Radar	2011	7"	WoM 040
Fat32	Fat32	2011	CD	WoM 041
Traditionalists	La Chanson De Jacky/The Western Exile	2012	7"	WoM 042
Secret Chiefs 3	Book of Souls: Folio A	2013	CD	WoM 043
Atomic Ape	Swarm	2014	CD	WoM 044
UR/Forms	Medium Aevum/Stars And Stripes Forever	2014	7"	WoM 045
Forms	Danse Macabre/Apocryphon Of Jupiter	2014	7"	WoM 046
Probosci	Time To Feed	2014	CD	WoM 047
Atomic Ape	Rampage	2014	7"	WoM 048
Cleric	Resumption	2014	7"	WoM 049
Ishraqiyun	Perichoresis	2014	CD/LP	WoM 050
Free Salamander Exhibit	Undestroyed	2016	CD/LP	WoM 051
UR	Telstar/The New Daylight	2016	7"	WoM 052
Cleric	Retrocausal	2017	CD/LP	WoM 055
