= The Book Beri'ah =

Box set by John Zorn
- Released: August 17, 2018
- Genre: Avant-garde jazz; klezmer
- Length: 9:36:00
- Label: Tzadik

Cleric chronology
Retrocausal (2017)	The Book Beri'ah (2018)

Secret Chiefs 3 chronology
Perichoresis (2014)	The Book Beri'ah (2018)

The Book Beri'ah is a box set by American saxophonist John Zorn, released on August 17, 2018, by Tzadik Records. The box comprises the final ninety-two compositions that complete the final installment of Zorn's twenty-five year Masada project in limited-edition box set of eleven compact discs.

All About Jazz commended the compositions for having many levels of meaning and sonic listenability.

== Track listing ==
Keter
No.	Title	Artist	Length
1.	"Ge'ulah"	Sofia Rei and JC Maillard	4:37
2.	"Setumah"	Sofia Rei and JC Maillard	5:04
3.	"Kayam"	Sofia Rei and JC Maillard	5:13
4.	"Rachamim"	Sofia Rei and JC Maillard	4:51
5.	"Penimi"	Sofia Rei and JC Maillard	4:18
6.	"Orot"	Sofia Rei and JC Maillard	6:29
7.	"Tikkun"	Sofia Rei and JC Maillard	4:01
8.	"Ketarim"	Sofia Rei and JC Maillard	5:31

Chokhma
No.	Title	Artist	Length
1.	"Gadolot"	Cleric	5:00
2.	"Panim"	Cleric	5:13
3.	"Kav"	Cleric	7:59
4.	"Nogah"	Cleric	8:32
5.	"Separ"	Cleric	7:11
6.	"Imma"	Cleric	8:51
7.	"Ta'amim"	Cleric	8:05
8.	"Iyyun"	Cleric	9:25
9.	"Chalal"	Cleric	7:36

Binah
No.	Title	Artist	Length
1.	"Levushim"	The Spike Orchestra	8:00
2.	"Damam"	The Spike Orchestra	5:48
3.	"Shamayim"	The Spike Orchestra	5:28
4.	"Tevunah"	The Spike Orchestra	6:10
5.	"Talpiot"	The Spike Orchestra	7:48
6.	"Posekim"	The Spike Orchestra	4:14
7.	"Kelim"	The Spike Orchestra	5:03
8.	"Macshavah"	The Spike Orchestra	10:12
9.	"Ma'amarot"	The Spike Orchestra	8:25

Chesed
No.	Title	Artist	Length
1.	"Katanot"	Julian Lage and Gyan Riley	4:35
2.	"Zeir Anpin"	Julian Lage and Gyan Riley	3:09
3.	"Sachel"	Julian Lage and Gyan Riley	4:10
4.	"Tohu"	Julian Lage and Gyan Riley	2:30
5.	"Hekhalot Zutari"	Julian Lage and Gyan Riley	4:14
6.	"Shevirah"	Julian Lage and Gyan Riley	2:51
7.	"Devekut"	Julian Lage and Gyan Riley	4:46
8.	"Dibor"	Julian Lage and Gyan Riley	2:48
9.	"Pnimiyut"	Julian Lage and Gyan Riley	4:54
10.	"Bohu"	Julian Lage and Gyan Riley	5:14

Gevurah
No.	Title	Artist	Length
1.	"Din"	Abraxas	5:18
2.	"Pagam"	Abraxas	3:01
3.	"Tamidi"	Abraxas	5:44
4.	"Da'at"	Abraxas	4:31
5.	"Bittul"	Abraxas	4:43
6.	"Kavannot"	Abraxas	6:26
7.	"Qiyyum"	Abraxas	7:06
8.	"Tzelem"	Abraxas	4:43
9.	"Betzaltzel"	Abraxas	5:50

Tiferet
No.	Title	Artist	Length
1.	"Hashawah"	Klezmerson	4:28
2.	"Middot"	Klezmerson	5:14
3.	"Reshimu"	Klezmerson	5:36
4.	"Sapir"	Klezmerson	4:16
5.	"Ratzon"	Klezmerson	4:37
6.	"Tomer"	Klezmerson	5:03
7.	"Nekevah"	Klezmerson	5:25
8.	"Zivugim"	Klezmerson	4:37

Netzach
No.	Title	Artist	Length
1.	"Pirke Avot"	The Gnostic Trio	5:02
2.	"Ha-Murgash"	The Gnostic Trio	8:36
3.	"Atarah"	The Gnostic Trio	4:32
4.	"Shi'ur Koma"	The Gnostic Trio	4:02
5.	"Safra"	The Gnostic Trio	3:09
6.	"Re'cha"	The Gnostic Trio	4:20
7.	"Merkaba"	The Gnostic Trio	6:23
8.	"Hispashut"	The Gnostic Trio	4:56
9.	"Olamot"	The Gnostic Trio	6:01

Hod
No.	Title	Artist	Length
1.	"Hod"	Zion80	5:35
2.	"Takhlit"	Zion80	7:46
3.	"Shelemut"	Zion80	9:06
4.	"Sharak"	Zion80	8:51
5.	"Tahor"	Zion80	10:42
6.	"Madregut"	Zion80	6:02
7.	"Reiah"	Zion80	8:44
8.	"Akudim"	Zion80	8:04
9.	"Shmecha"	Zion80	3:44

Yesod
No.	Title	Artist	Length
1.	"Iggulim"	Banquet of the Spirits	5:24
2.	"Nekudim"	Banquet of the Spirits	4:05
3.	"Hekhalot Rabbati"	Banquet of the Spirits	5:07
4.	"Berudim"	Banquet of the Spirits	8:19
5.	"Yeshut"	Banquet of the Spirits	4:52
6.	"Nischono"	Banquet of the Spirits	5:03
7.	"Tehiru"	Banquet of the Spirits	4:43
8.	"Dim Yoni"	Banquet of the Spirits	5:06
9.	"Teshuva"	Banquet of the Spirits	6:48

Malkhut
No.	Title	Artist	Length
1.	"Sitra Achra"	Secret Chiefs 3	3:28
2.	"Chitzonuyut"	Secret Chiefs 3	3:45
3.	"Shadim"	Secret Chiefs 3	4:52
4.	"Netzokim"	Secret Chiefs 3	4:18
5.	"Yekinah"	Secret Chiefs 3	4:34
6.	"Netzach"	Secret Chiefs 3	2:11
7.	"Sapar"	Secret Chiefs 3	3:57
8.	"Mishkan"	Secret Chiefs 3	3:51
9.	"Makif"	Secret Chiefs 3	1:36
10.	"Atzmut"	Secret Chiefs 3	3:36
11.	"Ayin"	Secret Chiefs 3	3:30
12.	"Shemot"	Secret Chiefs 3	3:33

Da'at
No.	Title	Artist	Length
1.	"Penimi"	Craig Taborn	5:21
2.	"Setumah"	Craig Taborn	4:57
3.	"Bohu"	Craig Taborn	3:05
4.	"Kayam"	Craig Taborn	5:52
5.	"Penimi"	Craig Taborn	9:33
6.	"Ketarim"	Craig Taborn · Vadim Neselovskyi	6:05
7.	"Ge'ulah"	Craig Taborn · Vadim Neselovskyi	4:14
8.	"Rachamin"	Vadim Neselovskyi	4:45
9.	"Orot"	Vadim Neselovskyi	3:44
10.	"Tikkun"	Vadim Neselovskyi	3:26
11.	"Bohu"	Vadim Neselovskyi Trio	5:48
12.	"Kayam"	Vadim Neselovskyi Trio	9:26
13.	"Kayam"	Vadim Neselovskyi Trio	6:12

== Personnel ==
Adapted from The Book Beri'ah liner notes.

- John Zorn – executive-producer
- Kazunori Sugiyama – co-producer
- Scott Hull – mastering
- Heung-Heung Chin (credited as Chippy) – design

== Release history ==
Region	Date	Label	Format	Catalog
United States	2018	Tzadik	CD	TZ5100
