= Lisa Fischer discography =

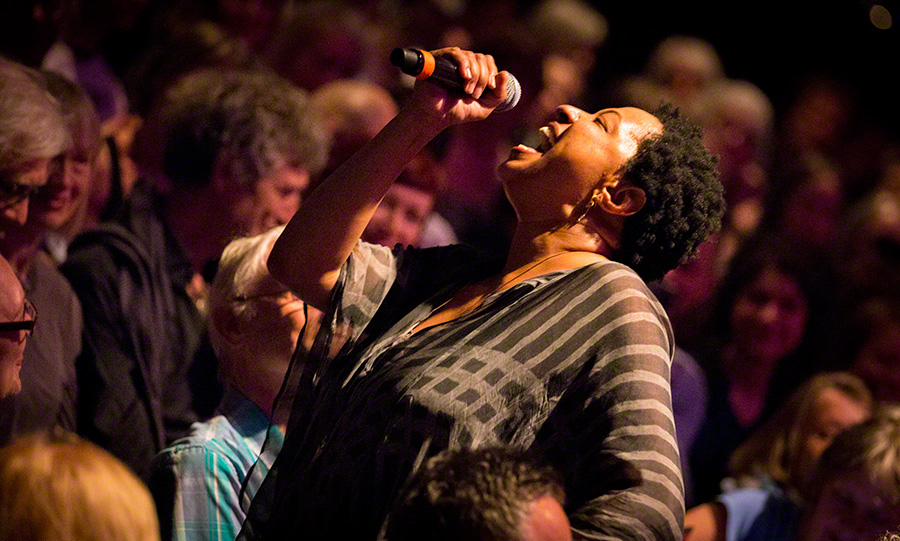
- Lisa Fischer performs at Cosmopolite in Oslo on 12. May 2016
- Studio albums: 1
- Singles: 14

American singer and songwriter Lisa Fischer has released one studio album and 14 singles (including 2 as a featured artist). She has performed background vocals on albums of many singers including Luther Vandross, Evelyn "Champagne" King, Nona Hendryx, Tina Turner, and many other singers.

== Albums ==
List of studio albums, with selected chart positions, sales figures and certifications
Title	Album details	Peak chart positions	
Title	Album details	US	US R&B
So Intense	Release date: April 9, 1991; Label: Elektra; Format: CD, LP, digital download	100	5

== Singles ==
=== As lead artist ===
List of singles as lead artist, with selected chart positions and certifications, showing year released and album name
Title	Year	Peak chart positions						Album
Title	Year	US	US R&B	US Adult	US Dance	US Main	AUS	Album
"On the Upside" (Note: Credited under the stage name "Xēna".)	1983	—	—	—	7	—	—	Non-album single
"Only Love (Shadows)"	1984	—	—	—	—	—	—	Non-album single
"Glad to be Alive"	1990	—	31	—	—	—	—	The Adventures of Ford Fairlane
"How Can I Ease the Pain"	1991	11	1	16	—	—	117	So Intense
"Save Me"	1991	74	7	—	2	—	—	So Intense
"So Intense"	1992	—	15	—	—	—	—	So Intense
"Colors of Love"	1993	—	18	24	—	—	—	Made in America
"Gimme Shelter" (with The Rolling Stones)	1998	—	—	—	—	29	—	No Security
"Didn't I (Blow Your Mind This Time)" (featuring Norman Connors)	2000	—	—	—	—	—	—	Eternity
"24 Hour Woman"	2000	—	—	—	—	—	—	Non-album single
"Into My Life (You Brought the Sunshine)" (featuring Louie Vega and Cindy Mizelle)	2008	—	—	—	—	—	—	Non-album single
"Love Will Know" (featuring Louie Vega)	2010	—	—	—	—	—	—	Non-album single
"—" denotes items which were not released in that country or failed to chart.

=== As featured artist ===
List of singles as featured artist, with selected chart positions and certifications, showing year released and album name
Title	Year	Peak chart positions				Album
Title	Year	US	US R&B	US Adult	US Dance	Album
"A Deeper Love" (Aretha Franklin featuring Lisa Fischer)	1994	63	30	—	1	Sister Act 2: Back in the Habit
"(Why Should I) Think About the Rain" (Dutch featuring Lisa Fischer)	2004	—	—	—	—	Non-album single
"—" denotes items which were not released in that country or failed to chart.

== Album/DVD/single appearances ==
- 1985: Luther Vandross - The Night I Fell in Love
- 1986: Randy Crawford - Abstract Emotions
- 1986: Bob James - Obsession
- 1989: The Rolling Stones - Mixed Emotions (single)
- 1989: The Rolling Stones - Rock and a Hard Place (single)
- 1989: The Rolling Stones - Terrifying (single)
- 1989: The Rolling Stones - Steel Wheels (album)
- 1989: The Rolling Stones - Another Side of Steel Wheels (album, CBS/Sony Japan)
- 1990: The Rolling Stones - Almost Hear You Sigh (single)
- 1990: Sam Riney - Playing With Fire (album)
- 1991: The Rolling Stones - Flashpoint (album)
- 1991: The Rolling Stones - Ruby Tuesday (live) (Maxi single)
- 1991: The Rolling Stones - Ruby Tuesday/Harlem Shuffle (live) (single)
- 1993: The Rolling Stones - Jump Back (album)
- 1994: The Rolling Stones - Live Voodoo Lounge – Live New Jersey, August 14, 1994 (Tour souvenir video)
- 1995: The Rolling Stones - Voodoo Lounge – Live Miami, November 25, 1994 (DVD/Video)
- 1995: The Rolling Stones - I Go Wild (single) backing vocals: live track
- 1995: The Rolling Stones - Like A Rolling Stone (single)
- 1995: The Rolling Stones - Stripped (album)
- 1995: The Rolling Stones - Voodoo Lounge CD Rom – Co-Starring: Lisa Fischer (CD Rom game)
- 1996: The Rolling Stones - Wild Horses (Maxi single) backing vocals: live tracks
- 1996: Luther Vandross - Your Secret Love
- 1996: Nicklebag - 12 Hits and a Bump (album)
- 1997: Grover Washington, Jr. - Breath of Heaven: A Holiday Collection
- 1997: Lee Ritenour - This Is Love (album)
- 1997: Nicklebag - Mas Feedback (album)
- 1997: The Rolling Stones - Saint of Me (CD-single) Incl. Gimme Shelter (live Amsterdam, 1995) Vocals: Lisa Fischer
- 1998: The Rolling Stones - No Security (album)
- 1999: The Rolling Stones - Bridges to Babylon Tour 97–98 (DVD/Video)
- 2000: Various Artists - A Love Affair: The Music of Ivan Lins
- 2001: Tina Turner - One Last Time Live in Concert - Live London, 2000 (DVD)
- 2002: The Rolling Stones - Forty Licks (album)
- 2003: The Rolling Stones - Four Flicks – Live 2002/2003 Tour (4DVD)
- 2004: Chuck Leavell - What's in That Bag? (album)
- 2004: The Rolling Stones - Live Licks (album)
- 2004: Toronto Rocks (DVD)
- 2004: River City Rebels- Hate To Be Loved (album)
- 2005: Tim Ries - The Rolling Stones Project (album)
- 2005: The Rolling Stones - Rarities 1971–2003 (album)
- 2005: Raul Midon - State of Mind
- 2006: Bernard Fowler - Friends with Privileges (Super Audio CD, Village Records Inc., Japan)
- 2006: Bernard Fowler - Friends with Privileges (album)
- 2006: The Rolling Stones - Biggest Mistake (single) backing vocals: 2 live tracks
- 2007: Kim Water - You Are My Lady (album)
- 2007: The Rolling Stones - The Biggest Bang – Live 2005/2006 Tour (4DVD)
- 2008: Aretha Franklin - This Christmas, Aretha (album)
- 2008: Tim Ries - Stones World (album)
- 2008: The Rolling Stones - Shine a Light (CD/DVD)
- 2009: Tina Turner - Tina Live (DVD/CD)
- 2009: Sting - If on a Winter's Night
- 2009: Sting - A Winter's Night Live from Durham Cathedral (DVD)
- 2010: Bobby McFerrin - VOCAbuLarieS
- 2010: The Rolling Stones - Exile on Main St. (remastered, backing vocals: CD2, bonus tracks) (album)
- 2010: The Rolling Stones - Exile On Main St. Rarities edition (album, USA release)
- 2010: The Rolling Stones - Plunded My Soul (Record Store Day single)
- 2010: Wingless Angels - Volumes I & II (album)
- 2011: Linda Chorney – Emotional Jukebox
- 2011: The Rolling Stones - Singles Box Set (1971–2006) Box Set Limited Edition 45CD's
- 2012: Chris Botti - Impressions (album)
- 2012: The Rolling Stones - Live at the Tokyo Dome (a digital official download through Google Music)
- 2012: The Rolling Stones - Light the Fuse (a digital official download through Google Music)
- 2012: The Rolling Stones - GRRR! (album)
- 2013: 121212 the Concert for Sandy Relief
- 2013: The Rolling Stones - Sweet Summer Sun
- 2013: John Mayer - Paradise Valley (album)
- 2013: Elements of Life - Eclipse Ibiza / Eclipse (album)
- 2014: Billy Childs- Map to the Treasure: Reimagining Laura Nyro (album)
- 2015: Bernard Fowler - The Bura (album)
- 2015: The Rolling Stones - Live at the Tokyo Dome (2CD/DVD)
- 2015: The Rolling Stones - From the Vault: Complete Series 1 (5DVD Box set)
- 2016: Louie Vega - Starring... XXVIII (CD/Album)
- 2016: Yo-Yo Ma and the Silk Road Ensemble - Sing Me Home (album)
- 2016: The Rolling Stones - Totally Stripped
- 2016: Lang Lang - New York Rhapsody (album)
- 2016: Lang Lang - Live at Lincoln Center Presents New York Rhapsody (DVD/Blu-ray)
- 2017: The Rolling Stones - Sticky Fingers – Live at the Fonda Theatre 2015
- 2018: The Rolling Stones - San Jose '99
- 2018: The Rolling Stones - Voodoo Lounge Uncut
- 2019: The Rolling Stones - HONK
- 2019: The Rolling Stones - Bridges to Buenos Aires
- 2020: The Rolling Stones - Steel Wheels Live (album)
- 2020: The Rolling Stones - Steel Wheels Live (10" Vinyl, 2 track, Picture Disc, RSD 2020)
- 2021: The Rolling Stones - A Bigger Bang Live (10" Vinyl, 2 track, RSD 2021)
- 2021: The Rolling Stones - A Bigger Bang: Live on Copacabana Beach
- 2022: The Rolling Stones - Licked Live in NYC
- 2022: The Rolling Stones - Grrr Live!
- 2024: The Rolling Stones - Live at the Wiltern
- 2024: The Rolling Stones - Welcome to Shepherd's Bush

== Soundtrack appearances ==
Song	Year	Movie
"Glad to Be Alive"	1990	The Adventures of Ford Fairlane
"O Come All Ye Faithful"	1992	Home Alone 2: Lost in New York
"Ruler of My Heart"	1992	That Night
"Colors of Love"	1993	Made in America
"Way Past Goodbye"	1998	Melrose Place Jazz
"Fingers"	2001	Cowboy Bebop: Future Blues
"Sure On This Shining Night"	2013	20 Feet from Stardom
"Lean on Me" (with Darlene Love, Jo Lawry, and Judith Hill)	2013	20 Feet from Stardom
