= Regression =

Regression or regressions may refer to:

== Arts and entertainment ==
- Regression (film), a 2015 horror film by Alejandro Amenábar, starring Ethan Hawke and Emma Watson
- Regression (magazine), an Australian punk rock fanzine (1982–1984)
- Regressions (album), 2010 album by Cleric

== Computing ==
- Software regression, the appearance of a bug in functionality that was working correctly in a previous revision
  - Regression testing, a software testing method which seeks to uncover regression bugs

== Hypnosis ==
- Age regression in therapy, a process claiming to retrieve memories
- Past life regression, a process claiming to retrieve memories of previous lives

== Science ==
- Marine regression, coastal advance due to falling sea level, the opposite of marine transgression
- Regression (medicine), a characteristic of diseases to express lighter symptoms or less extent (mainly for tumors), without disappearing totally
- Regression (psychology), a defensive reaction to some unaccepted impulses
- Nodal regression, the movement of the nodes of an object in orbit, in the opposite direction to the motion of the object

== Statistics ==
- Regression analysis, a statistical technique for estimating the relationships among variables. There are several types of regression:
  - Linear regression
  - Simple linear regression
  - Logistic regression
  - Nonlinear regression
  - Nonparametric regression
  - Robust regression
  - Stepwise regression
- Regression toward the mean, a common statistical phenomenon

== See also ==
- Infinite regress, a problem in epistemology
- Regress (disambiguation)
