= Helper =

Helper may refer to:

== Places ==
- Helper, Utah, U.S.A.
  - Helper station, an AMTRAK station
  - Helper Historic District

== People ==
- Domestic worker or domestic helper
- Helper (Subud), a person in a supporting role within the spiritual association Subud
- Helper, one of the personality types in the Enneagram of Personality

=== Persons ===
==== People with the surname ====
- Hinton Rowan Helper (1829–1909), Southern author and critic of slavery
- Joe Helper (born 1959), Labor politician serving in Victoria, Australia
- Susan Helper, American economist

=== Fictional characters ===
- H.E.L.P.eR., a supporting robotic character on The Venture Bros. television show
- Little Helper, a robot character in the Donald Duck universe

== Food ==
Betty Crocker brand packaged food "Helper" products, e.g., Asian Helper, Fruit Helper, Pork Helper, Whole Grain Helper, and:

- Chicken Helper, and Chicken and Chili Helper
- Hamburger Helper, and Hamburger Helper Microwave Singles
- Tuna Helper

== Other uses ==
- "Helpers", a 2017 episode of "Islands" from Adventure Time
- Helper class, a programming term
- Helper locomotive, coupled to a train to temporarily provide extra power
- Helpers at the nest, in birds
- Helper, a compact personal flotation device for providing first aid to a swimmer in case of a drowning threat
- The Tuna Helpers, (sometimes styled as TheTunaHelpers on albums and promotional materials), a former all-female American indie Gothic psychedelic art folk rock band based in Austin, Texas from 2000 to 2007

== See also ==
- Help (disambiguation)
