= Guided Tour (Gary Burton album) =

Studio album by Gary Burton
- Released: August 6, 2013
- Studio: MSR Studios, New York.
- Genre: Jazz
- Length: 1:04:49
- Label: Mack Avenue (MAC1074)
- Producer: Gary Burton

Gary Burton chronology
| Time Thread (2013) | Guided Tour (2013) |

Professional ratings
Review scores
| Source | Rating |
|---|---|
| AllMusic | 4/5 stars |
| All About Jazz | 5/5 stars |
| The Guardian | 4/5 stars |
| The Irish Times | 3/5 stars |
| PopMatters | 7/10 stars |

Guided Tour is a studio album by American jazz vibraphonist Gary Burton. The album was recorded in New York City together with guitarist Julian Lage, bassist Scott Colley and drummer Antonio Sanchez, and released on August 6, 2013 via Mack Avenue Records. The record consists of 10 tracks, paying tribute to the legacies of Thelonious Monk, Bill Evans, Jim Hall, and Astor Piazzolla. Eight of the compositions were by band-members. This was Burton’s final studio album before his 2017 retirement.

== Reception ==
Charley Raiff of Elmore Magazine wrote "Gary Burton, the pioneer of the four-mallet vibraphone technique, again exhibits his unfaltering vision of what playing that instrument should be in his newest release... Guided Tour serves as a magnificent follow-up to 2011’s Common Ground, and the pairing of Burton’s vibraphone and Lage’s guitar works better than ever. Despite his age, Burton seems to be just warming up."

Thom Jurek of Allmusic stated "On its sophomore offering for Mack Avenue Records, the New Gary Burton Quartet reveals the musical maturity that naturally occurs when a disparate but extremely gifted group of players locks in as a band... While Guided Tour proves that this band has hit its stride and fires exquisitely on all cylinders, it also reveals, that at age 70, Burton's fire for pushing his creative edge as a bandleader, and as a soloist, still burns brightly."

Dave Gelly of The Guardian noted "It's one thing to be a virtuoso player, which he is, but quite another to create a whole sonic world with just four musicians. That's what Burton has been doing consistently for more than 45 years and, as this second album by his newest quartet proves, the sounds just go on getting richer. Every one of these 10 pieces is filled with tonal light and shade, harmonic sparkle and rhythmic subtlety."

== Track listing ==
| No. | Title | Writer(s) | Length |
|---|---|---|---|
| 1. | "Caminos" | Sanchez | 7:19 |
| 2. | "The Lookout" | Lage | 5:52 |
| 3. | "Jane Fonda Called Again" | Burton | 6:23 |
| 4. | "Jackalope" | Fred Hersch | 6:32 |
| 5. | "Once Upon a Summertime" | Eddie Barclay, Johnny Mercer, Michel Legrand | 6:41 |
| 6. | "Sunday's Uncle" | Lage | 6:05 |
| 7. | "Remembering Tano" | Burton | 6:54 |
| 8. | "Helena" | Lage | 7:18 |
| 9. | "Legacy" | Colley | 6:39 |
| 10. | "Monk Fish" | Sanchez | 4:48 |
| Total length: | | | 1:04:49 |

== Personnel ==
Band

- Gary Burton – vibraphone
- Scott Colley – bass
- Antonio Sanchez – drums
- Julian Lage – guitar

Production

- Mark Wilder – mastering
- Gretchen C. Valade – executive producer
- Pete Karam – recording, mixing
