= Generations (Gary Burton album) =

Studio album by Gary Burton
- Released: April 13, 2004
- Recorded: September 16–18, 2003
- Studio: Fantasy Studios, Studio D, Berkeley, CA
- Genre: Jazz
- Length: 1:05:09
- Label: Concord Jazz CCD-2217-2
- Producer: Gary Burton

Gary Burton chronology
Music of Duke Ellington (2003)	Generations (2004)	Next Generation (2005)

Professional ratings
Review scores
Source	Rating
Allmusic	3/5 stars
The Scotsman	4/5 stars
The Penguin Guide to Jazz Recordings	3/4 stars

Generations is a studio album by American jazz vibraphonist Gary Burton. The album was released on April 13, 2004 via Concord Jazz label. It features Burton with a younger band of guitarist Julian Lage, pianist Makoto Ozone, bassist James Genus and drummer Clarence Penn.

== Reception ==
Dave Gelly of The Guardian stated, "A former youthful prodigy himself, Burton has been responsible for discovering and nurturing young talent throughout his long career, and he's done it again. Guitarist Julian Lage was 16 when this was recorded last September. He plays with astonishing maturity, knitting his lines into the group fabric with assurance and producing beautifully rounded solos. The title is apt, since the three main soloists represent different generations - Burton is 61 and pianist Makoto Ozone, an earlier Burton discovery, 43. It is good to hear Burton's vibraphone as part of a full quintet again, superb though his recent series of duet recordings have been. The most unselfish of leaders, he has the rare knack of making others play their best. Bassist James Genus and drummer Clarence Penn complete an ensemble that feels like a band, not just a collection of soloists."

Jerry Karp of SF Gate wrote, "Generations was recorded in September of last year with Ozone's regular rhythm section, bassist James Genus and drummer Clarence Penn. It's a rewarding collection in which Lage is revealed as a lithe, assured soloist and a talented composer. With the success of the "Generations" CD, Burton decided to put together a touring band, a decision facilitated by his retirement from Berklee School of Music in Boston after 33 years as a teacher and administrator, the last eight as executive vice president. The demands of that position had forced Burton to limit his live appearances primarily to duet performances with Ozone and another longtime collaborator, pianist Chick Corea. Before getting this ensemble on the road, Burton had gone a full seven years without a working band, a long time for a renowned group leader."

== Track listing ==
No.	Title	Writer(s)	Length
1.	"First Impression"	Julian Lage	6:33
2.	"Early"	Julian Lage	5:36
3.	"Gorgeous"	Mitchel Forman	7:39
4.	"Wheatland"	Oscar Peterson	5:33
5.	"Take Another Look"	Pat Metheny	6:39
6.	"Syndrome"	Carla Bley	5:19
7.	"Test of Time"	Makoto Ozone	5:22
8.	"The Title Will Follow"	Julian Lage	7:50
9.	"Ladies in Mercedes"	Steve Swallow	6:22
10.	"Héroes Sin Nombre"	Makoto Ozone	8:16
Total length:			1:05:09

== Personnel ==
- Gary Burton – producer, vibraphone
- James Genus – bass
- Julian Lage – guitar
- Makoto Ozone – piano
- Clarence Penn – drums
