= Cleric (band) =

American band

- Origin: Philadelphia, Pennsylvania, US
- Genres: Avant-garde metal; post-metal; mathcore; grindcore; doom metal
- Years active: 2003–present
- Labels: Web of Mimicry, Redefining Darkness Records
- Members: Matt Hollenberg; Larry Kwartowitz; Daniel Ephraim Kennedy; Nick Shellenberger
- Past members: James Lynch; Chris Weindel
- Website: iamcleric.com

Cleric is an American band based out of Philadelphia, Pennsylvania, United States. Formed in 2003, their initial lineup consisted of guitarist Matt Hollenberg, drummer Larry Kwartowitz, vocalist Nick Shellenberger and bassist Chris Weindel. After their first EP, Chris Weindel was replaced by James Lynch, who was succeeded by bassist Daniel Ephraim Kennedy in 2012. Informed by metal pioneers such as Meshuggah, Converge, Fantômas, and Neurosis, the band is known for their experimental approach to grindcore, doom and avant-garde metal. Cleric has released four studio albums: Regressions (2010), Retrocausal (2017), Chokhma (2018) and John Zorn's Bagatelles volume 12 (2022).

== History ==
=== Formation and early success (2003–2010) ===
Cleric was formed in 2003 and quickly debuted with an extended play titled The Underling, which was recorded for $200. The band began composing music for film, working with a slasher film series called Punk Rock Holocaust and the alternative porn outlet Burning Angel. In 2008, the band received a nomination for Best Music at the AVN Awards for their contribution to a pornographic film parody of Party Monster, titled Porny Monster. Their demo Allotriophagy and 7" single Cumberbund also garnered some favorable reviews and critical notice. Afterward, the band was signed to Web of Mimicry run by Trey Spruance, best recognized for his work in Secret Chiefs 3 and Mr. Bungle.

=== Regressions and tour (2010–present) ===
The band released their full-length debut album, titled Regressions, on April 27, 2010. It was produced by Colin Marston, who credited the album with being the most time-consuming and challenging job in his career due to the density and complexity of the compositions. The album received positive markups from critics, who praised the band for their aggressive demeanor and willingness to experiment. In describing the band's sound, Philip Montoro of the Chicago Reader said "the music this Philadelphia four-piece plays is a kind of metal the way Lost Highway is a kind of movie. It's an elastic tissue of creepy electronic noise and barely human screaming, impregnated with patches of riff-salad grind and hypercube mathcore."

In September 2010, the band was robbed of a substantial amount of equipment and gear after a show in Brooklyn, effectively halting their recording and touring momentum. They managed to recoup some of their losses by tracking down a portion stolen goods in pawn shops and asking fans to donate to the band's Kickstarter. In 2013, the band announced the delayed tour in support of their debut album and released the Resumption digital single. Cleric also returned to the studio with producer Colin Marston and entered pre-production on a new album. Also planned is a compilation of music they have composed for films over a past three period. In early November, Cleric began their first country-wide tour, which lasted until December. The band's second album was titled Retrocausal and released on December 8, 2017, by Web of Mimicry. In August of the following year the John Zorn box set The Book Beri'ah, containing Cleric's third album Chokhma, was released by Tzadik Records.

== Band members ==
Current members

- Matt Hollenberg – guitar (2003–present)
- Larry Kwartowitz – drums (2003–present)
- Nick Shellenberger – vocals (2003–present), keyboards (2006–present)
- Daniel Ephraim Kennedy – bass (2012–present)

Past members

- James Lynch – bass (2006–2012)
- Chris Weindel – bass (2003–2006)

Timeline

== Discography ==
Studio albums

- Regressions (2010)
- Retrocausal (2017)
- Chokhma (The Book Beri'ah) (2018)
- John Zorn's Bagatelles volume 12 (2022)

Extended plays

- The Underling (2003)

Singles

- Cumberbund (2008)
- Resumption (2014)
