= Infinito (Cyro Baptista album) =

Studio album by Cyro Baptista's Banquet of the Spirits
- Released: July 28, 2009
- Recorded: 2009
- Genre: World music
- Length: 47:37
- Label: Tzadik; 7630
- Producer: Cyro Baptista

Cyro Baptista chronology
Banquet of the Spirits (2008)	Infinito (2009)	Caym: Book of Angels Volume 17 (2011)

Infinito is an album by percussionist Cyro Baptista which is the second recorded by Banquet of the Spirits – Baptista, bassist Shanir Ezra Blumenkranz, keyboard player Brian Marsella, and drummer Tim Keiper – which was released on the Tzadik label in 2009.

== Reception ==
Professional ratings
Review scores
Source	Rating
Allmusic	4/5 stars

Thom Jurek of Allmusic said "Despite the kaleidoscopic ambition of Infinito, and its sometimes frenetic pace, the album is quite accessible, and a pleasure to listen to and indulge in. If only most popular music, Brazilian or otherwise, were this colorful and exciting. This is another winner in a catalog full of them". On All About Jazz Joel Roberts commented that "Infinito is a joyous, carnival-like treat for listeners who appreciate music without boundaries".

== Track listing ==
All compositions by Cyro Baptista except as indicated

1. "Infinito (Coming)" (Cyro Baptista, Scott Kettner) – 5:15
2. "Batida de Côco" (Baptista, Teese Gohl, Hermeto Pascoal) – 5:51
3. "In Vitrous" – 2:54
4. "Kwanza" – 5:10
5. "Noia" – 4:30
6. "Adeus Às Filhas" – 7:11
7. "Coronation of a Slave Queen" – 1:42
8. "Cantor Cuidadoso" – 2:14
9. "Pro Flávio" – 6:43
10. "Blindman" – 2:06
11. "Infinito (Going)" – 3:52

== Personnel ==
- Cyro Baptista – percussion, vocals
- Brian Marsella – keyboards, melodica
- Shanir Ezra Blumenkranz – oud, bass
- Tim Keiper – drums
- Kevin Breit, Romero Lubambo – guitar
- Erik Friedlander – cello
- Ikue Mori – electronics
- Anat Cohen – clarinet, saxophone
- Skye Steele – violin
- Zé Mauricio – conga
- Chikako Iwahori – surdo
- Sharon Epperson, Scott Kettner – alfaia
- Anne Pope – caixa
- Sergio Brandao – bass
- Cadu Costa – acoustic guitar, bells, Rhodes piano, background vocals
