= The Underling =

EP by Cleric
- Released: Spring 2003
- Recorded: 2003
- Studio: Bowling Otter Recordings, Lansdale, PA
- Genre: Metalcore, post-hardcore, avant-garde metal
- Length: 30:15
- Producer: Matt Buckley

Cleric chronology
The Underling (2003)	Regressions (2010)

The Underling is the debut EP of Cleric, released independently in 2003. It was recorded for $200 at Bowling Otter Recordings by Matt Buckley. Mixing was never completed because the hard drive containing the album failed, leaving the album unfinished. In celebration of the three-year anniversary of their 2010 debut album, the band remastered The Underling in 2013 and uploaded the music to Bandcamp.

== Track listing ==
All tracks are written by Matt Hollenberg, Larry Kwartowitz, Chris Weindel, and Nick Shellenberger.

No.	Title	Length
1.	"Truth"	7:27
2.	"El Camaron"	6:54
3.	"Eris, Engulfed"	3:55
4.	"Draw [a] Robot./Island of Lost Souls, Pt. 1"	11:59

== Personnel ==
Adapted from The Underling liner notes.

Cleric

- Matt Hollenberg – electric guitar
- Larry Kwartowitz – drums
- Nick Shellenberger – vocals, cover art
- Chris Weindel – bass guitar

Production and additional personnel

- Matt Buckley – production
- Cleric – production, recording

== Release history ==
Region	Date	Label	Format
United States	2003	self-released	CD
