= Regress =

Regress may refer to:

- Infinite regress (epistemology), a problem in epistemology concerning the justification of propositions
- Infinite regress, a problem in philosophy such the infinite regress of causes

== See also ==
- Regression (disambiguation)
