= Retrocausal =

Studio album by Cleric
- Released: December 8, 2017
- Studios: The Thousand Caves (Woodhaven, NY)
- Genres: Avant-garde metal; doom metal; grindcore
- Length: 78:44
- Label: Web of Mimicry

Cleric chronology
Regressions (2010)	Retrocausal (2017)	Chokhma (2018)

Retrocausal is the second studio album by the American experimental heavy metal group Cleric, released on December 8, 2017 by Web of Mimicry.

== Reception ==
Critic Emmett Palaima called Retrocausal Cleric's most extensive work and said "it's a lot to take in and most certainly isn’t for the faint of ear, but the level of musicianship put into it is worth recognition."

== Track listing ==
All tracks are written by Matt Hollenberg, Daniel Ephraim Kennedy, Larry Kwartowitz and Nick Shellenberger.

No.	Title	Length
1.	"The Treme"	9:39
2.	"Ifrit"	9:59
3.	"Lowell"	4:42
4.	"Lunger"	6:55
5.	"Soroboruo"	4:21
6.	"Resumption"	13:17
7.	"The Spiraling Abyss"	10:34
8.	"Triskaidekaphobe"	11:45
9.	"Grey Lodge"	7:33

== Personnel ==
Adapted from the Retrocausal liner notes.

Cleric

- Matt Hollenberg – guitars
- Daniel Ephraim Kennedy – bass guitar, guitar
- Larry Kwartowitz – drums, percussion
- Nick Shellenberger – vocals, keyboards, sampler, photography, design, guitar (6, 7), bass guitar (7, 8), war drums (8)

Additional musicians

- Mick Barr – guitar (5)
- Timb Harris – violin (1)
- John Zorn – alto saxophone (9)

Production and design

- Jess Conda – photography, design
- Jamie Lawson – photography, design
- Colin Marston – engineering, mixing, mastering
- Jackson Shellenberger – photography, design

== Release history ==
Region	Date	Label	Format	Catalog
United States	2017	Web of Mimicry	CD	WoM 055
