= Makoto Ozone =

Japanese jazz pianist

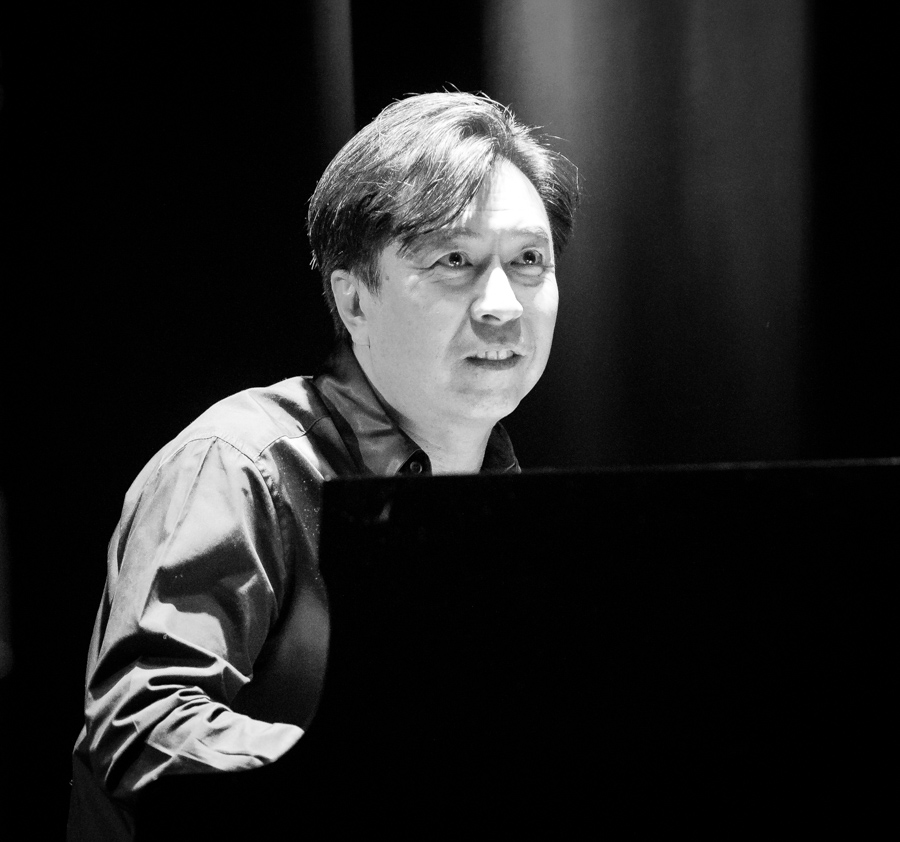
- At Cosmopolite scene in Oslo in 2017

Background information
- Born: March 25, 1961 (age 65); Kobe, Japan
- Genres: Jazz
- Occupation: Musician
- Instrument: Piano
- Years active: 1976 – present
- Website: makotoozone.com

Makoto Ozone (小曽根真; Pronounced [Oh-zone'-ay]; born March 25, 1961) is a Japanese jazz pianist.

== Career ==
Ozone was born in Kobe, Japan. He began playing organ at two and by seven was an improviser. He appeared on Japanese television with his father, himself a pianist and club owner in Kobe, from 1968 to 1970. At the age of twelve, Ozone switched to piano after being impressed by the albums of Oscar Peterson, taking two years of classical piano lessons. In 1980, he entered the Berklee College of Music and later worked with Gary Burton. He also had his recording debut in 1983 before returning to his native Japan.

Ozone has collaborated with vocalist Kimiko Itoh. They appeared as a duo at the Montreux Jazz Festival, and he produced her album Kimiko, which won the 2000 Swing Journal jazz disk grand prix for Japanese vocalist.

Ozone has been visiting professor of jazz at the Kunitachi College of Music since 2010.

== Honors ==
- 2003: Honorary Doctorate of Music from Berklee College of Music.
- 2018: Medal of Honor with Purple Ribbon (紫綬褒章 (しじゅほうしょう), Shijuhōshō)

== Discography ==
=== As leader/co-leader ===
- Live!! At The Berklee Performance Center with Phil Wilson (Shiah, 1983) – live
- Makoto Ozone (CBS/Sony, 1984) – rec. 1981
- After (CBS/Sony, 1986)
- Spring Is Here (Columbia, 1987)
- Now You Know (Columbia, 1987)
- Starlight (JVC/Victor, 1990)
- Paradise Wings (JVC/Victor, 1991)
- Walk Alone (JVC/Victor, 1992)
- Breakout (Verve, 1994)
- Face to face with Gary Burton (GRP, 1995)
- Nature Boys (Verve, 1995)
- At the Montreux Jazz Festival (Videoarts, 1997) – live
- Makoto Ozone: The Trio (Verve, 1997)
- Three Wishes (Verve, 1998) – rec. 1997
- Dear Oscar (Polydor, 1998)
- No Strings Attached (Polydor, 1999)
- Pandora (Verve, 2000)
- So Many Colors (Verve, 2001)
- Treasure (Verve, 2002)
- Reborn (Verve, 2003)
- Virtuosi with Gary Burton (Concord, 2003)
- New Spirit (Universal, 2004)
- Real (Verve, 2005)
- Duet with Satoru Shionoya (Verve, 2005) – live
- Alive!!: Live at Blue Note Tokyo (Universal, 2007) – live rec. 2006
- Falling in love, again (Universal, 2007)
- Ballads (Verve, 2008)
- Jungle (Verve, 2009)
- Road to Chopin (Universal, 2010)
- Haiku with Anna Maria Jopek (Universal Music Polska, 2011)
- Live & Let Live - Love For Japan (Verve, 2011) - live
- Pure Pleasure For The Piano with Ellis Marsalis Jr. (EmArcy, 2012)
- My Witch's Blue with Christian McBride, Jeff "Tain" Watts (Verve, 2012)
- Time Thread with Gary Burton (Verve, 2013)
- Dimensions (Verve, 2017)
- Until We Vanish (Universal, 2019)
- Resonance with Chick Corea (Universal, 2021) – live rec. 2016
- Ozone 60 (Verve, 2021)
- Ozone 60: Standards (Verve, 2022)
- A Night in Tokyo (Live at Bunkamura Orchard Hall 2013) (Universal Music, 2023) – live rec. 2013
- Trinfinity (Universal Music, 2024) – rec. 2023

=== As No Name Horses ===
- No Name Horses (Universal, 2006)
- No Name Horses II (Verve, 2008)
- Jungle (Verve, 2009)
- Back at The Club "IN TRIBUTE" (Universal, 2011)
- Road: Rhapsody in Blue (Universal, 2014)
- Day 1 (Universal, 2024)

=== Soundtracks ===
- Ashita no Kita Yoshio (あしたの、喜多善男) - Original Soundtrack (Universal, 2008)
- NHK The World Heritage: The Swell of Time - Original Soundtrack (Universal, 2011)

=== As sideman ===
With Gary Burton

- Real Life Hits (ECM, 1984)
- Whiz Kids (ECM, 1986)
- Generations (Concord, 2004)

With others

- Bobby Shew, Breakfast Wine (Pausa, 1985)
