= The New Crystal Silence =

Live album by Chick Corea & Gary Burton
- Released: February 5, 2008
- Recorded: May and July 2007
- Genre: Jazz
- Length: 122:58
- Label: Concord
- Producer: Chick Corea, Gary Burton

Gary Burton & Chick Corea chronology
| In Concert, Zürich, October 28, 1979 (1980) | The New Crystal Silence (2008) |

Chick Corea chronology
| 5trios - 5. Brooklyn, Paris to Clearwater (2007) | The New Crystal Silence (2008) | Duet (2008) |

Gary Burton chronology
| Next Generation (2005) | The New Crystal Silence (2008) | Quartet Live (2009) |

Professional ratings
Review scores
| Source | Rating |
|---|---|
| AllMusic | 4/5 stars |
| BBC | (positive) |

The New Crystal Silence is a 2008 live jazz album by pianist Chick Corea and vibraphonist Gary Burton. It was released in a two-disc set. The first disc was recorded on May 10 and 12, 2007, at the Sydney Opera House Concert Hall. The second disc was recorded on July 7, 2007, at Bjornsonhuset in Molde, Norway, except for the track "Señor Mouse", which was recorded July 13, 2007, at the Auditorio de Tenerife in Canary Island, Spain.

== Reception ==
The album peaked number 11 on the Billboard Top Jazz album charts and also won the Grammy awards for the Best Jazz Instrumental Album, Individual or Group.

== Track listing ==
Disc one

1. "Duende" (Corea) – 10:54
2. "Love Castle" (Corea) – 12:41
3. "Brasilia" (Corea) – 9:38
4. "Crystal Silence" (Corea) – 14:09
5. "La Fiesta" (Corea) – 13:35

Disc two

1. "Bud Powell" (Corea) – 7:55
2. "Waltz for Debby" (Bill Evans) – 8:03
3. "Alegria" (Corea) – 5:49
4. "No Mystery" (Corea) – 9:12
5. "Señor Mouse" (Corea) – 9:10
6. "Sweet and Lovely" (Gus Arnheim, Charles Daniels, Harry Tobias) – 6:56
7. "I Love You Porgy" (George Gershwin, Ira Gershwin & DuBose Heyward) – 4:09
8. "La Fiesta" (Corea) – 10:41

== Personnel ==
- Chick Corea – piano
- Gary Burton – vibraphone
- Sydney Symphony Orchestra
- Jonathan Stockhammer – conductor

== Chart performance ==
| Year | Chart | Position |
|---|---|---|
| 2008 | Billboard Top Jazz Albums | 11 |

== See also ==
- Crystal Silence (ECM, 1973)
