= Makoto Ozone (album) =

Studio album by Makoto Ozone
- Released: 1984
- Genre: Contemporary jazz
- Length: 52:39
- Label: Columbia
- Producer: Gary Burton

Makoto Ozone chronology
| Makoto Ozone (1984) | After (1986) |

Makoto Ozone is the debut studio album by Japanese jazz pianist Makoto Ozone, released in 1984 by Columbia Records. It was produced by vibraphonist Gary Burton.

== Critical reception ==
Ken Franckling of United Press International praised the album, calling it "very special" and writing that "his virtuosic playing is downright fascinating, backed by vibist and mentor Gary Burton and bassist Eddie Gomez." Scott Yanow, writing for AllMusic, stated that Ozone "already had impressive technique and a generally introspective style". Although he criticized the album's sleepiness, he stated that "the pianist does show a lot of potential." Music critic J. D. Considine praised Ozone's playing, writing in The Washington Post that "his touch is exquisite, and his improvisation is so fluid", although he criticized the overt influence of Burton on the album's compositions.

== Charts ==
| Chart (1984) | Peak position |
|---|---|
| US Top Jazz Albums (Billboard) | 34 |

== Track listing ==
| No. | Title | Length |
|---|---|---|
| 1. | "Crystal Love" | 6:53 |
| 2. | "I Need You Here" | 8:22 |
| 3. | "Flight" | 8:15 |
| 4. | "Endless Season, Pt. 1" | 7:18 |
| 5. | "Endless Season, Pt. 2" | 8:31 |
| 6. | "Improvisation" | 4:35 |
