= Next Generation (Gary Burton album) =

Studio album by Gary Burton
- Released: April 12, 2005
- Recorded: November 8 and 10, 2004
- Studio: Fantasy Studios, Studio D, Berkeley, CA
- Genre: Jazz
- Length: 1:02:22
- Label: Concord Jazz CCD-2277-2
- Producer: Gary Burton, Nick Phillips

Gary Burton chronology
Generations (2004)	Next Generation (2005)	The New Crystal Silence (2008)

Professional ratings
Review scores
Source	Rating
Allmusic	4/5 stars
The Guardian	3/5 stars
All About Jazz	4/5 stars
The Penguin Guide to Jazz Recordings	3/4 stars

Next Generation is a studio album by American jazz vibraphonist Gary Burton. The album was released on April 12, 2005 via Concord Jazz label. It features Burton with a group of prodigies including guitarist Julian Lage, pianist Vadim Neselovskyi, bassist Luques Curtis and drummer James Williams.

== Reception ==
John Fordham of The Guardian wrote "There's a strong Pat Metheny feel in plenty of places (pianist Vadim Neselovskyi is a particular devotee, to judge by the easy swing of his work here) and Gary Burton's openness to both classical music and jazz gets a shapely acknowledgement in Samuel Barber's Fuga. The crystal stream of Burton's vibes winds engagingly around the piano and guitar on the standard My Romance, but it's bassist Luques Curtis's vampy, elliptical blues Ques Sez that brings the nearest thing to a mischievous flush to the cheeks of this rather glossily formal music. Pianist Neselovskyi also sounds the most promising of the young improvisers on it. Classical listeners on the lookout for jazz that doesn't tingle the teeth may like this set very much, but for all the collective expertise, very few unexpected corners get turned."

Ken Dryden of Allmusic stated "This meeting of a jazz master and four prodigies is well worth acquiring."

== Track listing ==
No.	Title	Writer(s)	Length
1.	"Prelude for Vibes"	Vadim Neselovskyi	6:02
2.	"My Romance"	Lorenz Hart, Richard Rodgers	6:23
3.	"'Ques Sez"	Luques Curtis	7:07
4.	"Get Up and Go"	Vadim Neselovskyi	7:58
5.	"B & G"	Pat Metheny	6:26
6.	"A Dance for Most of You"	Alain Mallet	5:54
7.	"Walkin' in Music"	Julian Lage	6:26
8.	"Summer Band Camp"	Mick Goodrick	5:05
9.	"Fuga"	Samuel Barber	5:27
10.	"Clarity"	Julian Lage	5:56
Total length:			1:02:22

== Personnel ==
- Gary Burton – vibraphone
- Vadim Neselovskyi – piano
- Julian Lage – guitar
- James Williams – drums
- Luques Curtis – bass
