= Quartet Live =

Live album by Gary Burton
- Released: 2009
- Recorded: June 10–11, 2007
- Venue: Yoshi's, Oakland, California
- Genre: Jazz
- Length: 79:20
- Label: Concord Jazz CJA-31303-02
- Producer: Gary Burton, Pat Metheny

Gary Burton chronology
The New Crystal Silence (2008)	Quartet Live (2009)	Common Ground (2011)

Pat Metheny chronology
Upojenie (2008)	Quartet Live (2009)	Orchestrion (2010)

Quartet Live is a 2009 live album by American jazz vibraphonist Gary Burton. The record features a revival of Burton’s quartet format of the late 1960s and early 1970s, and the return of Burton veterans Pat Metheny on guitar and Steve Swallow on bass guitar along with Antonio Sanchez on drums. The album was recorded on June 10–11, 2007, at Yoshi's jazz club and released in 2009 via the Concord Jazz label.

== Reception ==
Professional ratings
Review scores
Source	Rating
All About Jazz	5/5 stars
AllMusic	4.5/5 stars
The Guardian	4/5 stars

John Fordham of The Guardian wrote, "This group sounds as if it's on even more of a roll on this California live recording than it was at a thrilled Barbican last summer. A guitar/vibes dialogue might sound like a recipe for lots of notes and chamber-jazz, but this band is as hard-grooving as Gary Burton's original 1970s quartet - which also featured this group's bass guitarist, Steve Swallow, and a 19-year-old Metheny. Burton, one of the most creative figures in the first wave of jazz-rock, achieved a near-perfect balance of striking tunes, jazz fluency and country-rock conviviality".

Ken Dryden of AllMusic stated, "This reunion will hopefully lead to future recorded reunions by these four gifted musicians."

== Track listing ==
No.	Title	Writer(s)	Length
1.	"Sea Journey"	Chick Corea, Neville Potter	9:00
2.	"Olhos de Gato"	Carla Bley	6:36
3.	"Falling Grace"	Steve Swallow	7:18
4.	"Coral"	Keith Jarrett	6:23
5.	"Walter L"	Gary Burton	5:30
6.	"B and G (Midwestern Night's Dream)"	Pat Metheny	6:53
7.	"Missouri Uncompromised"	Pat Metheny	7:34
8.	"Fleurette Africaine (Little African Flower)"	Duke Ellington	7:34
9.	"Hullo, Bolinas"	Steve Swallow	4:48
10.	"Syndrome"	Carla Bley	4:42
11.	"Question and Answer"	Pat Metheny	13:02
Total length:			79:20

== Personnel ==
- Gary Burton – vibraphone
- Pat Metheny – guitar
- Steve Swallow – bass
- Antonio Sanchez – drums
