= Time Thread =

Studio album by Makoto Ozone and Gary Burton
- Released: June 11, 2013
- Recorded: March 21–23, 2013
- Studio: Avatar, New York City
- Genre: Jazz
- Length: 1:03:38
- Label: Verve (UCCJ-2112)
- Producer: Makoto Shinohara, Makoto Ozone

Makoto Ozone chronology
| My Witch's Blue (2012) | Time Thread (2013) | Road: Rhapsody in Blue (2014) |

Gary Burton chronology
| Hot House (2012) | Time Thread (2013) | Guided Tour (2013) |

Time Thread is a studio album by Japanese jazz pianist Makoto Ozone and American jazz vibraphonist Gary Burton. This collaboration album was released on June 11, 2013 via Verve Records.

== Track listing ==
All tracks are written by Makoto Ozone (except for track 12 written by Dick Gasparre, George Fragos, and Jack Baker).

| No. | Title | Length |
|---|---|---|
| 1. | "Fat Cat" | 4:34 |
| 2. | "Stompin' At B.P.C." | 4:49 |
| 3. | "Lee's Party" | 5:24 |
| 4. | "Sol Azteca" | 6:45 |
| 5. | "Italpark" | 6:48 |
| 6. | "Hearts in Langenhagen" | 4:58 |
| 7. | "Popcorn Explosion" | 4:37 |
| 8. | "Time Thread" | 5:51 |
| 9. | "Part I "Lyon in the Morning – I Hear a Trouble!"" (Suite "One Long Day in France") | 4:22 |
| 10. | "Part II "Cordon Bleu"" (Suite "One Long Day in France") | 4:17 |
| 11. | "Part III "Deux Petites Voitures Françaises – The Concert"" (Suite "One Long Day in France") | 5:29 |
| 12. | "I Hear a Rhapsody" | 5:42 |
| Total length: | | 1:03:38 |

== Personnel ==
Duo

- Makoto Ozone – piano
- Gary Burton – vibraphone

Production

- Makoto Ozone – producer
- Makoto Shinohara – producer
- Akihiro Nishimura – recording
- Brett Mayer – mixing
- Joe Ferla – mixing, engineering
- Greg Calbi – mastering
