= Hot House (Gary Burton and Chick Corea album) =

Studio album by Chick Corea and Gary Burton
- Released: March 20, 2012
- Studios: Avatar, New York City; Mad Hatter East, New York City
- Genre: Jazz
- Length: 74:57
- Label: Concord Jazz
- Producers: Chick Corea and Gary Burton

Chick Corea chronology
The Continents (2012)	Hot House (2012)	The Mothership Returns (2012)

Gary Burton chronology
Common Ground (2011)	Hot House (2012)	Time Thread (2013)

Hot House is the seventh recording by vibraphonist Gary Burton and pianist Chick Corea, released in March 2012 from Concord Jazz label. It received Grammy Award nominations in Best Jazz Instrumental Album, and the title track "Hot House" won the Best Improvised Jazz Solo.

== Reception ==
Professional ratings
Review scores
Source	Rating
AllMusic	4/5 stars
All About Jazz	(not rated)

The Allmusic review by Thom Jurek awarded the album four stars and states, "This is collaboration in its purest and most elegant form."

Thom Jurek of Allmusic wrote "This time out, Corea and Burton picked pieces by some of their favorite composers -- mostly from the jazz world, of course -- yet chose compositions that were less than obvious... The duo's approach in wedding mainstream and modern jazz (often inside the same tune) will appeal mostly to fans of the duo's previous six recordings. That said, Hot House is a further example of the nearly symbiotic language they've developed over the past 40 years, and is a stellar example of masterful dialogic articulation and execution. This is collaboration in its purest and most elegant form."

== Track listing ==
1. "Can't We Be Friends" (Paul James, Kay Swift) – 7:26
2. "Eleanor Rigby" (John Lennon, Paul McCartney) – 7:01
3. "Chega de Saudade" (Antônio Carlos Jobim, Vinícius de Moraes) – 10:46
4. "Time Remembered" (Bill Evans) – 6:13
5. "Hot House" (Tadd Dameron) – 3:54
6. "Strange Meadow Lark" (Dave Brubeck) – 7:05
7. "Light Blue" (Thelonious Monk) – 6:04
8. "Once I Loved" (Antônio Carlos Jobim, Vinícius de Moraes) – 7:22
9. "My Ship" (Ira Gershwin, Kurt Weill) – 11:53
10. "Mozart Goes Dancing" (Chick Corea) – 7:13

== Personnel ==
Musicians

- Gary Burton — vibraphone
- Chick Corea — piano
- Ilmar Gavilan — violin
- Melissa White — violin
- Juan Miguel Hernandez — viola
- Paul Wiancko — cello

Production

- Chick Corea — producer
- Gary Burton — producer
- Bill Rooney — executive producer
- Greg Calbi — mastering
- Steve Fallone — mastering
- Bernie Kirsch — engineer, mixing
- Gloria Kaba — mixing assistant
- Bob Cetti — assistant engineer
- Bob Mallory — assistant engineer
- Glenn Suyker — piano technician
- Evelyn Brechtlein — production coordination
- Dan Muse — Liner Note Coordination
- Andrew Elliott — Personal assistant
- Julie Rooney — art coordinator, photography
- Marc Bessant — graphics
- Ernest Gregory — photography

== Charts ==
Chart (2012)	Peak position
Billboard Jazz Albums	12
