= Lisa Fischer =

American vocalist and songwriter (born 1958)

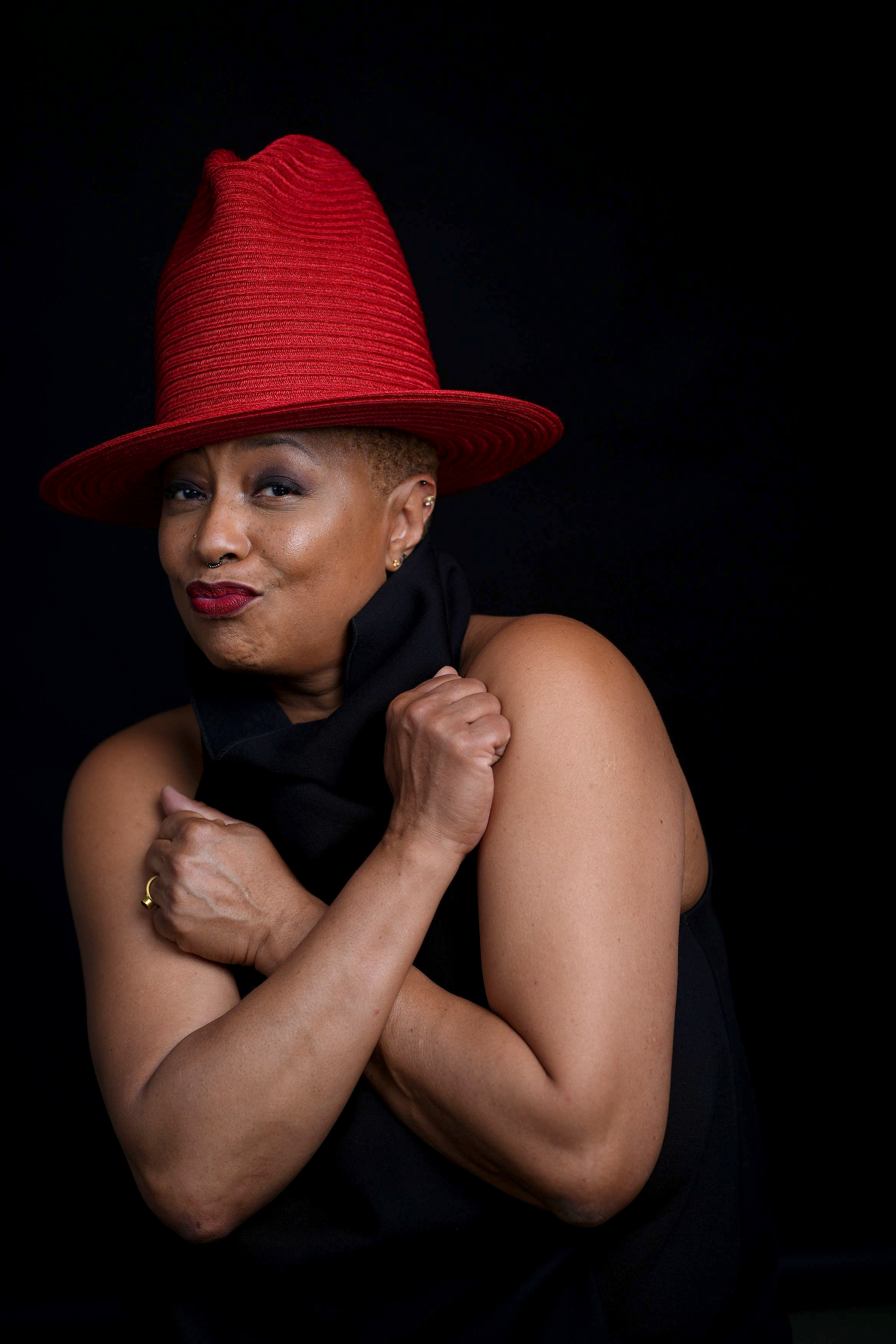
- Fischer in 2023

Background information
- Born: Lisa Melonie Fischer; December 1, 1958 (age 67); New York, New York, U.S.
- Genres: Rock; R&B; pop; electronic; freestyle; soul; house
- Occupations: Singer; songwriter; record producer; musician
- Instruments: Vocals; guitar
- Years active: 1983–present
- Label: Elektra
- Website: lisafischermusic.com

Lisa Melonie Fischer (born December 1, 1958) is an American singer and songwriter. She found success with her 1991 debut album So Intense, which produced the Grammy Award–winning hit single "How Can I Ease the Pain". She has been a back-up singer for a number of artists, including Sting, Luther Vandross, and Tina Turner, and she toured with The Rolling Stones from 1989 to 2015.

== Early life ==
Lisa Melonie Fischer was born in the Fort Greene neighborhood in the New York City borough of Brooklyn. Fischer's mother gave birth to her at age 16 and had three children by the time she was 19. Fischer has fond memories of singing with her mother (a homemaker), her father (a warehouse worker and security officer), and her two younger brothers. She attended The High School of Music & Art in Manhattan. When Fischer was 14 her father left the family and when Fischer was 17, her mother died.

In an interview with Christian Wikane of PopMatters, Fischer stated she was influenced by Freda Payne, Marvin Gaye and Melba Moore, and others early in her childhood. In the years before launching her solo mainstream career, she noted significant influence from the black LGBT community, particularly in developing a stage image with adventure, quality, and beauty.

== Career ==
=== 1983–1989: Xēna and The Rolling Stones ===
In 1983, under the stage name "Xēna", Fischer released the b-boy classic "On the Upside". In 1984, a club track she recorded titled "Only Love (Shadows)" was briefly featured in the motion picture Beat Street and was later released in 1995 as part of the Hot Productions' The Best of Criminal Records compilation. However, Fischer began her music career supporting other artists providing backing vocals for artists including Melba Moore and Billy Ocean. She worked with many other famous singers, both as a session vocalist and sideman. She accompanied Luther Vandross whom she met through the mutual acquaintance of choreographer Bruce Wallace, who asked her to come to his agency for an audition. Fischer then traveled as a backup singer on his tours and sang on his albums until his death. She also sang backup for other famous musicians, including Chaka Khan, Teddy Pendergrass, and Roberta Flack.

Fischer maintained her career as a session singer, and has accompanied The Rolling Stones on tour since 1989. She worked as a backup vocalist during the same period for Luther Vandross for the 22 years prior to his death alongside friend and collaborator Ava Cherry, juggling his concert tours and those of The Rolling Stones, with whom she grew an audience playing the foil to Mick Jagger onstage. During tours with the Rolling Stones, she shares lead vocals on several songs, including "Monkey Man, and "Gimme Shelter", which showcase her vocal talents.

=== 1990–1994: So Intense ===
Fischer's solo career peaked with the 1991 release of "How Can I Ease the Pain" from her album So Intense, reaching Number One on the R&B charts, and winning a Grammy Award for Best Female R&B Vocal Performance in 1992. The album spawned three Top 20 R&B hits, and peaked at #5 on the Top R&B/Hip-Hop Albums chart and #100 on the Billboard 200 chart. Asked about the inspiration for her album, Fischer replied "I wasn't deep in search of a record deal, it was just one of those things...". In the movie 20 Feet From Stardom, Fischer's Grammy award for her hit single collects dust on a shelf. Fischer said she "just doesn't know what to do with it". Although Fischer earned success with her first album, a follow-up solo studio album was not released because an attempt to create a second album failed due to "energy shifts".

Fischer recorded on various projects including providing lead vocals on the power ballad "Colors of Love" featured on the soundtrack for the film Made in America. Fischer says a contributing factor in her decision to discontinue her solo career following the release of her debut album was her fondness for backing vocalist rather than a solo artist. In a 2013 article, Fischer compared back-up singing to a "tuning fork", and noted she rejected the idea of dissatisfaction and the theory of always aspiring for something more while creating music and supporting other artists. In 1992, Fischer traveled to Japan to perform in the Earth Voice Concert with Lee Ritenour, Phil Perry, Bobby Caldwell, Brenda Russell, James Ingram, Michael McDonald, Anita Baker, and others. During the concert, Fischer sang her 1991 hit "How Can I Ease The Pain", and provided backing vocals for her fellow musicians.

=== 1996: Theatre ===
In August 1996, Fischer made her theatre debut in the off-Broadway play Born to Sing! chronicling the life and career of the fictional gospel superstar, Doris Winter. The final installment of the Mama, I Want to Sing! trilogy featured Fischer in the starring role of Doris Winter, and followed the character as she assembled a company of fellow singers for a global World Peace and Harmony Tour.

=== 1996–2013: Backup singing ===
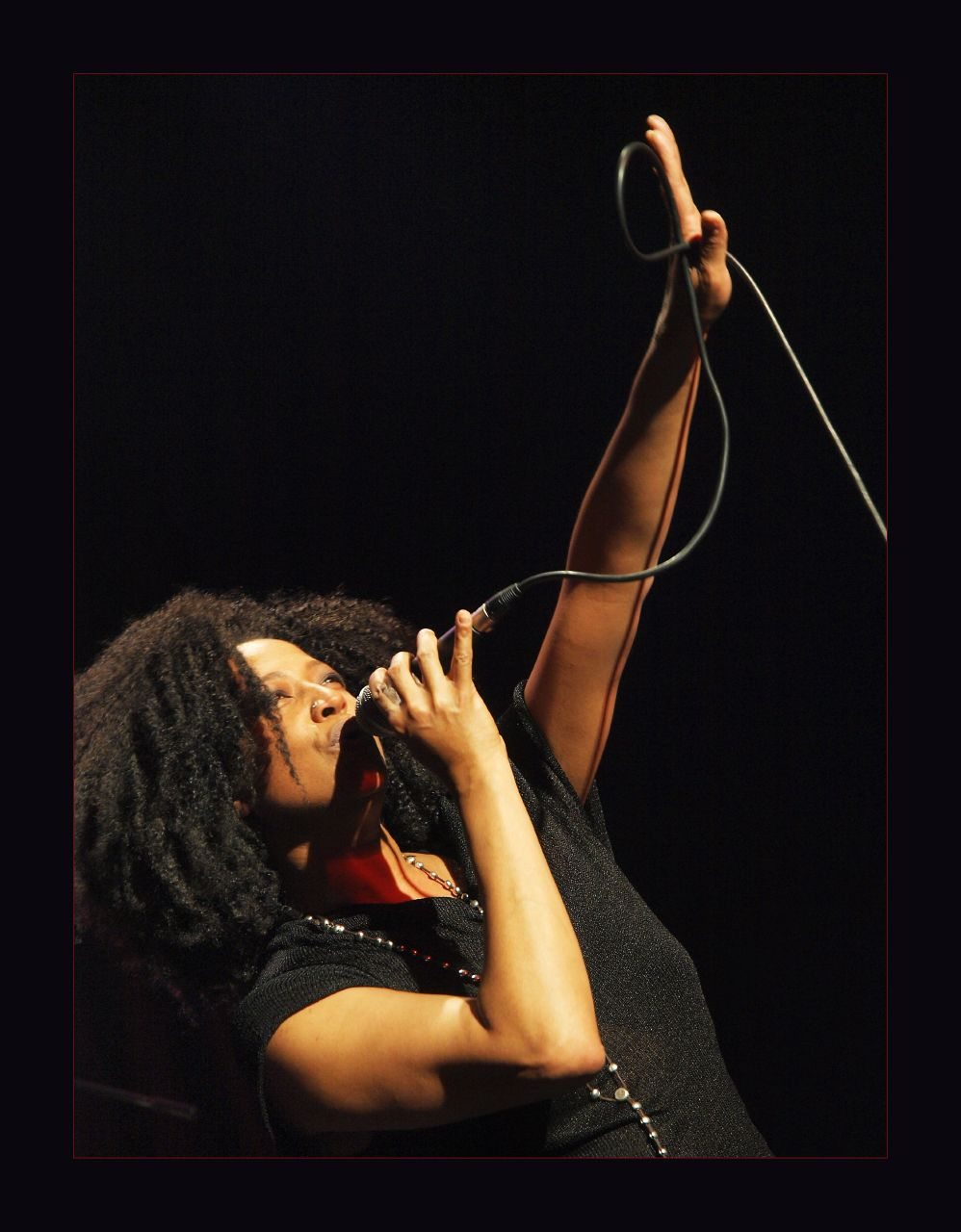
Fischer performing in 2008

Fischer continued to work on music, doing background vocals and writing songs for other artists, including Anane Vega. Fischer toured with Tina Turner on her Twenty Four Seven Tour. It was the worldwide top-grossing tour of 2000. Lisa was featured in an April 14, 2008 issue of Jet Magazine′s "Where Are They Now?" column. In 2009, Fischer completed touring with Tina Turner on her Tina!: 50th Anniversary Tour, and is featured on Turner's live DVD-CD titled Tina Live. In the performance of Tina!: 50th Anniversary Tour, Fischer and Turner sang "It's Only Rock 'n Roll (But I Like It)" together; after Turner left the stage, Fischer completed the song solo.

Fischer sang on Sting's album If on a Winter's Night... as a backing vocalist. In September 2009, Sting and his band with Fischer performed in Durham Cathedral. The rehearsals as well as the concert are available as a DVD. The behind-the-scenes documentary surrounding the event was produced jointly by the BBC, and was screened on December 29 that year. She appeared at the 2010 CareFusion Newport Jazz Festival in Newport, Rhode Island with jazz trumpeter Chris Botti. She toured with Botti through 2010, including appearing nightly as guest vocalist during the trumpeter's annual holiday engagement at the Blue Note Jazz Club in New York city. She remained a guest artist with Botti's band in 2011, and continued to appear at their 2012 concerts.

In 2012, she joined the Rolling Stones for their 50 & Counting Tour in October 2012, and toured globally with the band until July 2013. The band announced a follow-up tour 14 On Fire scheduled to start in February, including dates in the Middle East, Asia, and Europe in summer 2014, and Australia in fall 2014.

In 2013, Fischer joined the rock band Nine Inch Nails as a backing vocalist for their Tension 2013 tour.

=== 2013–2014: 20 Feet from Stardom ===
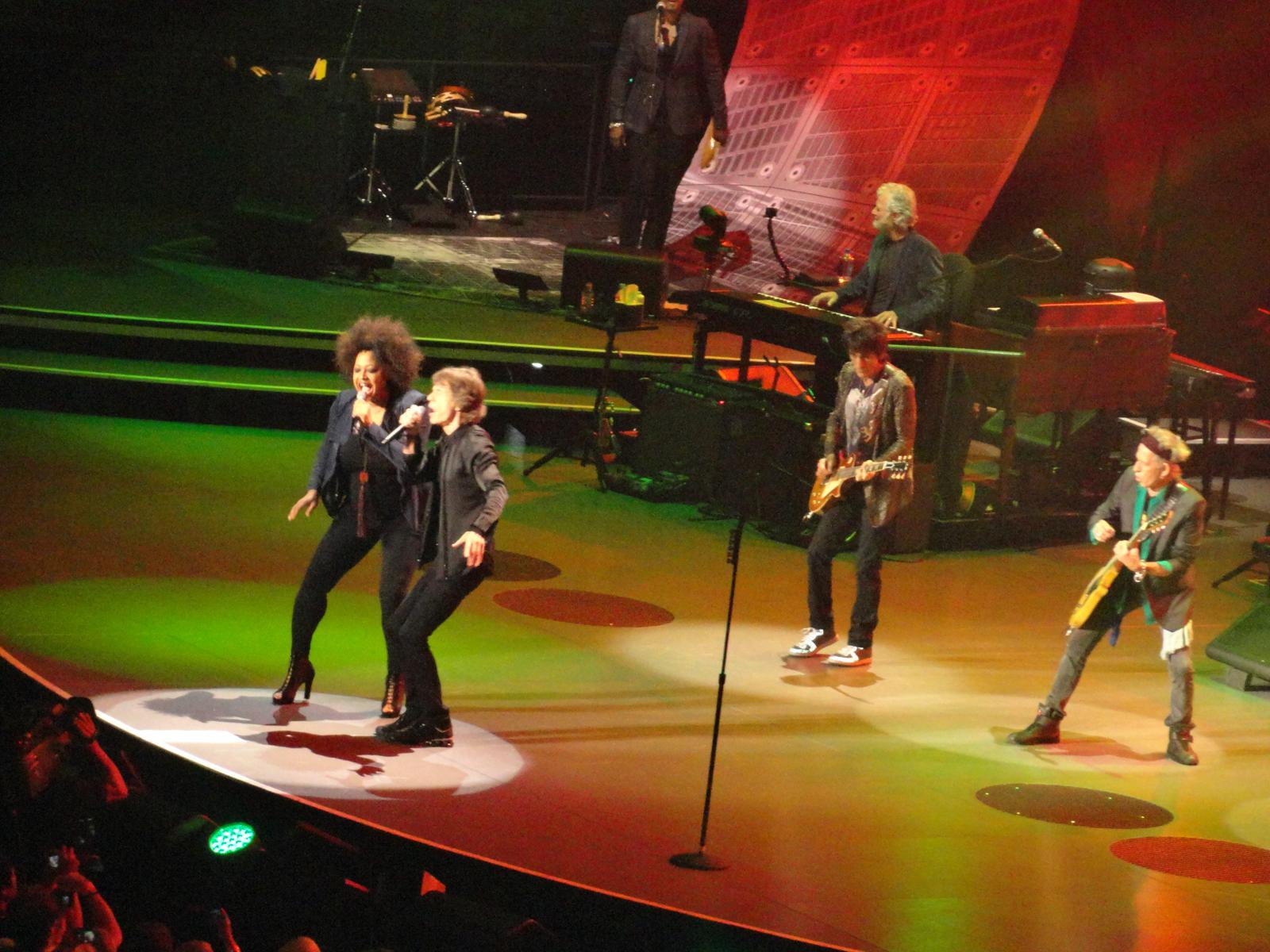
Fischer singing with Jagger and The Rolling Stones during their Fifty and Counting Tour, in Boston Mass., June 12, 2013

Fischer is one of the artists featured in the Oscar-winning documentary film 20 Feet from Stardom (2013), which premiered at the Sundance Film Festival and was released on June 21, 2013. The documentary highlights back-up singers by archiving the oral histories of artists like Merry Clayton and Darlene Love and their experiences within the American music industry. The film earned the 2015 Grammy Award for Best Music Film, with the award presented to the featured artists as well as the production crew.

In 2014, Fischer re-united with many of the back-up singers in 20 Feet From Stardom including Darlene Love, Merry Clayton, and Judith Hill to sing the national anthem at the 100th Rose Bowl in Pasadena, California.

=== 2014–present: Solo career ===
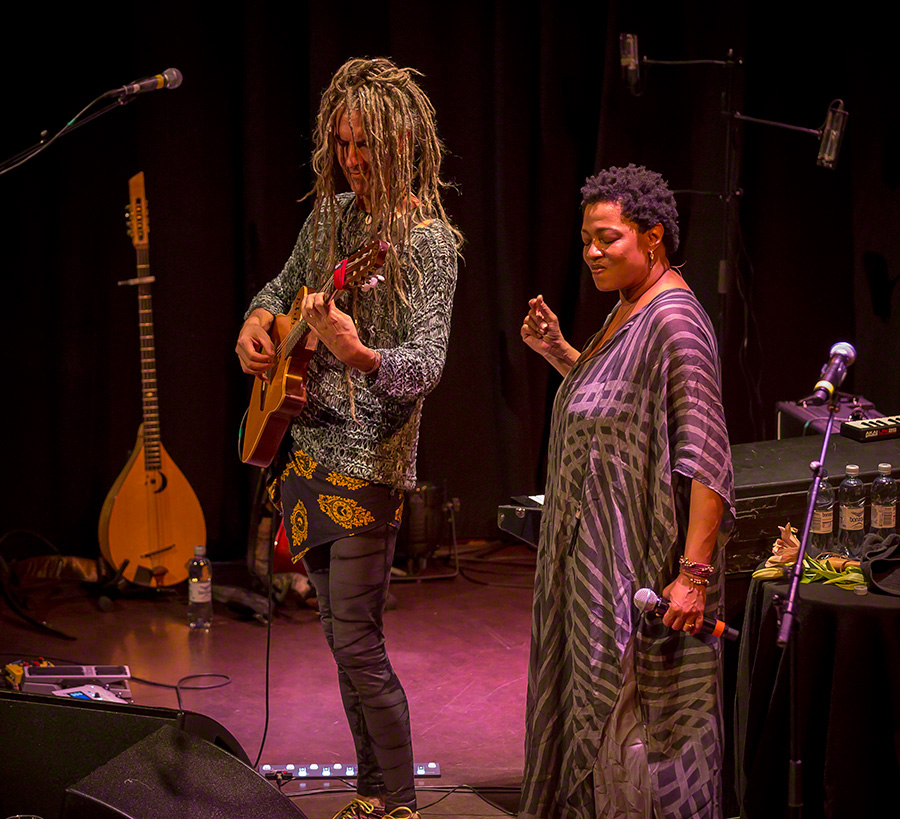
Fischer performing with JC Maillard in 2016

In 2014, Fischer began her solo tour accompanied by her band Grand Baton, performing across the United States, Canada, Europe, Asia, Australia, and New Zealand. That same year, a press release announced Fischer would collaborate with performer Billy Childs on a studio project about Laura Nyro. 2015, returning to her solo career, Fischer sold out six consecutive shows at The Jazz Standard in New York City.

In 2015, she, along with her musical director, the composer, arranger, and pianist JC Maillard, collaborated with choreographer Alonzo King to create the music/dance ensemble piece entitled The Propelled Heart for the Alonzo King LINES Ballet. The Propelled Heart premiered at the Yerba Buena Center for the Arts in San Francisco on November 6, 2015. In September 2017, Fischer reprised her role in The Propelled Heart at the Kwai Tsing Theatre in Hong Kong. The program returned to the SF Bay Area's Yerba Buena Center for the Arts in November 2017 in honor of the 35th Anniversary of LINES Ballet.

In addition to her collaboration with King, in 2016, Fischer provided vocal performances on three Grammy nominated projects including Louie Vega Starring...XXVIII with Louie Vega and The Elements of Life; Sing Me Home with Yo-Yo Ma, The Silkroad Ensemble, and Gregory Porter; as well as New York Rhapsody with Lang Lang and Jeffrey Wright. In February 2018, Fischer's vocal performances were featured in the HBO Film presentation Notes From The Field written and produced by playwright Anna Deavere Smith.

Fischer and Grand Baton partnered with The Seattle Symphony for their program Just A Kiss Away in February 2018 in which rock music anthems such as The Rolling Stones' "Gimme Shelter" were re-created orchestrally. The orchestral arrangements were composed by Chris Walden.

== Discography ==
Albums

- So Intense (1991)

== Tours ==
Year(s)	Tour	Artist(s)	Role
1985	I Feel for You Tour	Chaka Khan	Backing Vocalist
1985–1986	The Night I Fell in Love Tour	Luther Vandross	Backing Vocalist
1987	Give Me the Reason Tour	Luther Vandross	Backing Vocalist
1988	Any Love World Tour	Luther Vandross	Backing Vocalist
1989–1990	Steel Wheels/Urban Jungle Tour	The Rolling Stones	Backing Vocalist
1990	Best of Love Tour	Luther Vandross	Backing Vocalist
1991	The Power of Love Tour	Luther Vandross	Backing Vocalist
1993–1994	Never Let Me Go World Tour	Luther Vandross	Backing Vocalist
1994–1995	Voodoo Lounge Tour	The Rolling Stones	Backing Vocalist
1997	Your Secret Love World Tour	Luther Vandross	Backing Vocalist
1997–1998	Bridges to Babylon Tour	The Rolling Stones	Backing Vocalist
1999	No Security Tour	The Rolling Stones	Backing Vocalist
2000	Twenty Four Seven Tour	Tina Turner	Backing Vocalist
2001–2002	Take You Out Tour	Luther Vandross	Backing Vocalist
2002	BK Got Soul Tour	Luther Vandross	Backing Vocalist
2002–2003	Licks Tour	The Rolling Stones	Backing Vocalist
2005–2007	A Bigger Bang Tour	The Rolling Stones	Backing Vocalist
2008–2009	Tina!: 50th Anniversary Tour	Tina Turner	Backing Vocalist
2010–2012	Chris Botti Tour	Chris Botti	Lead Vocalist
2012–2013	50 & Counting Tour	The Rolling Stones	Backing Vocalist
2013	Louie Vega & The Elements of Life (EOL)	Louie Vega	Lead Vocalist
2013	Tension 2013	Nine Inch Nails	Backing Vocalist
2014	14 On Fire Tour	The Rolling Stones	Backing Vocalist
2014–Present	Ms. Lisa Fischer & Grand Baton Tour	Lisa Fischer & Grand Baton	Lead Vocalist
2015	Zip Code Tour	The Rolling Stones	Backing Vocalist

== Awards and nominations ==
Year	Association	Category	Work	Result
1992	Soul Train Music Award	Best New Artist	So Intense	Nominated
1992	Soul Train Music Award	Best R&B/Soul Single – Female	"How Can I Ease the Pain"	Won
1992	Soul Train Music Award	Best R&B/Soul Album – Female	So Intense	Nominated
1992	Grammy Award	Best Female R&B Vocal Performance	"How Can I Ease the Pain"	Won
1992	Grammy Award	Best R&B Song	"How Can I Ease the Pain"	Nominated
2014	Grammy Award	Best Music Film	20 Feet from Stardom	Won

== Filmography ==
Year	Film	Genre	Role
2008	Shine a Light	Documentary	Herself
2013	20 Feet from Stardom	Documentary	Herself
2017	Every Night's a Saturday Night	Documentary	Herself
2017	The Rolling Stones: Sticky Fingers Live at The Fonda Theatre 2015	Documentary	Herself
2018	Notes From the Field	Television Film	Performer & Composer

== Theatre ==
Year	Show	Role	Notes
1996	Born to Sing!	Doris Winter	Union Square Theatre; August 1996 – January 1997
