= Regressions (album) =

2010 first studio album by Cleric

Studio album by Cleric
- Released: March 27, 2010
- Recorded: 2009
- Studio: The Thousand Caves, Woodhaven, NY
- Genre: Avant-garde metal, post-metal, grindcore, mathcore, doom metal
- Length: 76:13
- Label: Web of Mimicry
- Producer: Colin Marston

Cleric chronology
The Underling (2003)	Regressions (2010)	Retrocausal (2017)

Regressions is the first studio album by Cleric, released on April 27, 2010, by Web of Mimicry.

== Recording ==
Cleric recorded Regressions in Queens, New York, with producer Colin Marston. The music was recorded at The Thousand Caves, Marston's studio, and put guitar, drums, and bass guitar simultaneously on reel-to-reel tape. In contrast to the rest of the album, the music that "The Fiberglass Cheesecake" comprises was assembled in the studio rather than performed, making it difficult to reproduce in a live setting. In crafting the track, the band used a sound replacer, recording the drummer, Larry Kwartowitz, using his hands to play a part on his lap and then replacing the sounds of his hands with drums. Marston commented on the album's recording process in an interview with American Aftermath: "Regressions by Cleric took waaaaaay longer than any other record I've ever worked on. It's also probably the most dense in terms of the sheer number and complexity of layers being heard at any given time."

== Music ==
Regressions' sound is a complex and dense mixture of mathcore and post-rock with doom metal and experimental leanings. In describing the band's sound, Philip Montoro of the Chicago Reader wrote, "The music this Philadelphia four-piece plays is a kind of metal the way Lost Highway is a kind of movie. It's an elastic tissue of creepy electronic noise and barely human screaming, impregnated with patches of riff-salad grind and hypercube mathcore." The opening track, "Allotriophagy", is the longest on the album at 19 minutes and 23 seconds. It was originally recorded for the band's 2006 demo EP of the same name. It begins with a brief segment of ambient sounds before launching into an aggressive grindcore performance. It then slowly unravels into drone music, which is overtaken by Middle Eastern tinged vocals and rhythms.

== Critical reception ==
Professional ratings
Review scores
Source	Rating
Exclaim!	Favorable
PopMatters	(8/10)

Regressions received some favorable reviews from music critics, primarily for its aggressive and experimental nature. Keith Carman of Exclaim! called it "progressive, vitriolic and overwhelming", further writing that "essentially, within any given song, one hears the detonation of Pig Destroyer, adrenaline of Converge, creative technicality of Nomeansno and Psyopus, outright weirdness of Fantômas uniting with P.I.L.'s Flowers of Romance and creepiness of, well, not much is creepier than hearing tribal rhythms clashing with banshee wails and thundering guitar". Writing for PopMatters, Ron Hart credited the band with being "unrelenting in their aspirations to spill the doom metal blood all over Brian Eno's Green World, a feat they succeed at quite excellently across this ten-song, 76-minute epic of an album".

== Track listing ==
All tracks are written by Matt Hollenberg, Larry Kwartowitz, James Lynch and Nick Shellenberger.

No.	Title	Length
1.	"Allotriophagy"	19:23
2.	"-----"	1:52
3.	"A Rush of Blood"	10:17
4.	"-----"	2:08
5.	"The Boon"	6:22
6.	"-----"	2:12
7.	"Cumberbund"	12:06
8.	"Poisonberry Pie"	9:54
9.	"&"	0:31
10.	"The Fiberglass Cheesecake"	11:28

== Personnel ==
Adapted from the Regressions liner notes.

Cleric

- Matt Hollenberg – electric guitar, bağlama, design
- Larry Kwartowitz – drums, percussion
- James Lynch – bass guitar, tenori-on, theremin, percussion (1)
- Nick Shellenberger – vocals, keyboards, percussion (1), electric guitar (10), bass guitar (10), design

Production and additional personnel

- Justin Ahiyon – percussion (1, 5)
- Cleric – production
- Maria Juranic – photography
- Colin Marston – production, recording, mixing, mastering

== Release history ==
Region	Date	Label	Format	Catalog
United States	2010	Web of Mimicry	CD	WoM038
