= Grand Baton =

American band

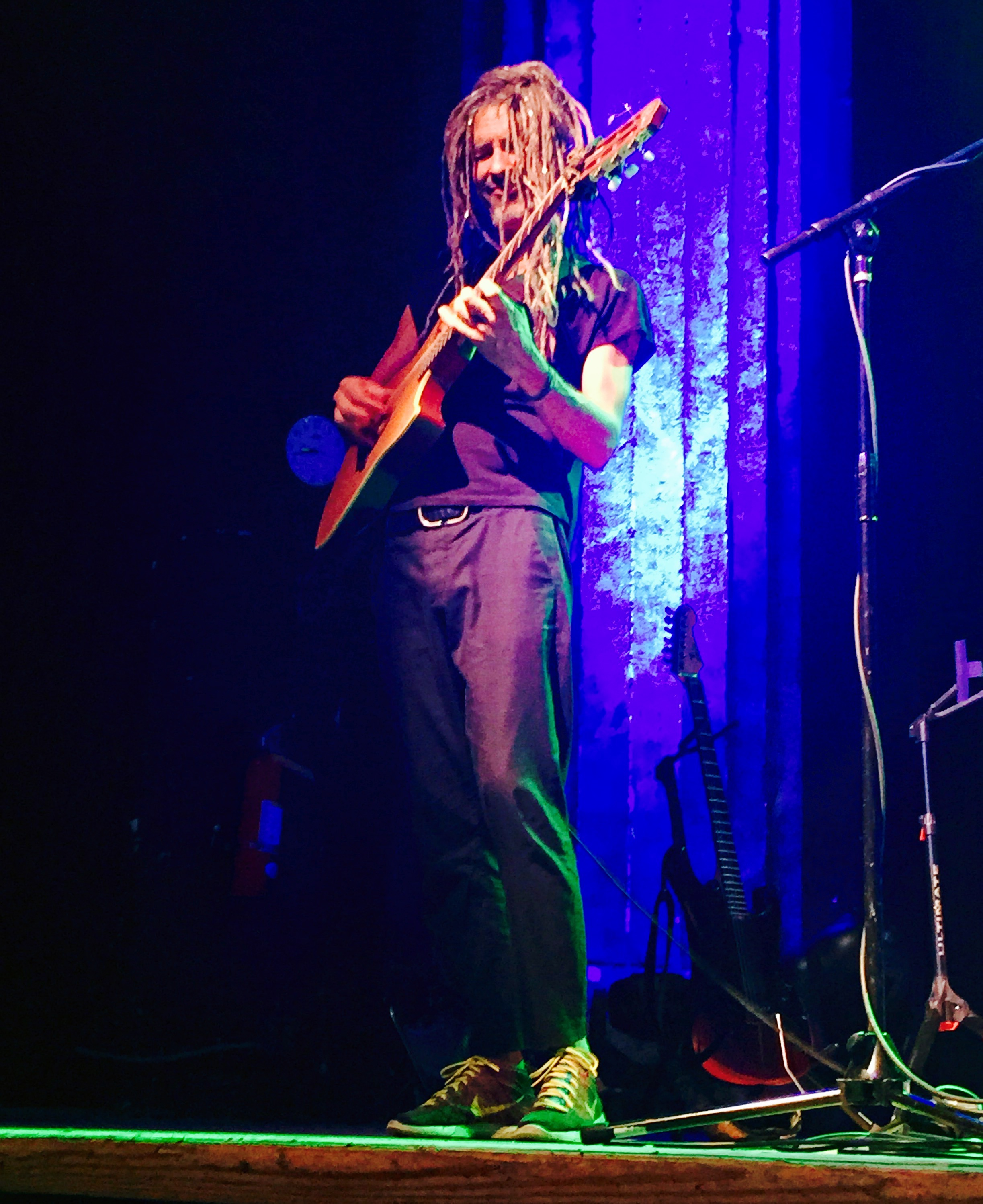
- JC Maillard of Grand Baton performing at Variety Playhouse in Atlanta, September 2015

Background information
- Origin: New York City, United States
- Genres: Progressive rock, Afro-Caribbean music, electronic rock, jazz fusion
- Years active: 2006 - Present
- Label: Self Published
- Members: JC Maillard; Thierry Arpino; Aidan Carroll
- Website: www.grandbaton.com

Grand Baton is an Afro-Caribbean, progressive rock and jazz fusion band based in New York City. The band was founded by the composer, arranger, guitarist, pianist, singer and songwriter Jean-Cristophe (JC) Maillard, a native of Pointe-à-Pitre, Guadeloupe.

== Background ==
Grand Baton, founded by Maillard in 2006, currently performs as a trio and consists of Maillard on vocals, guitar, keyboards and the SazBass, Thierry Arpino on drums and percussion, and Aidan Carroll on upright and electric bass.

The band has released two studio albums. Le Grand Baton was released in 2007 and Carnal Carnival in 2013.

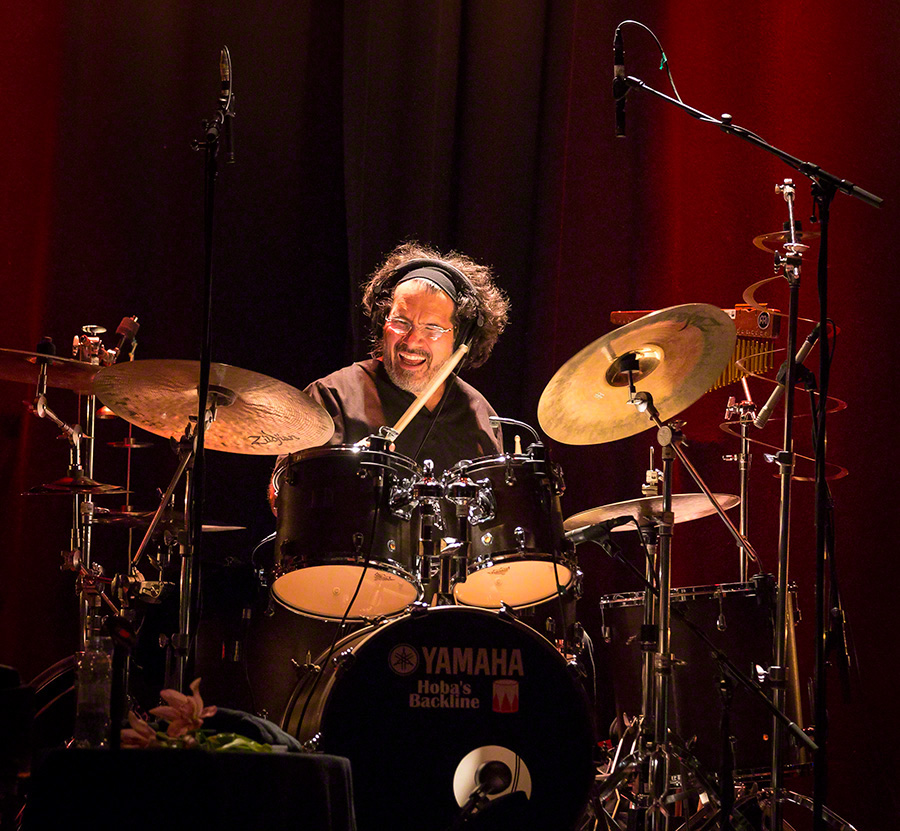
Grand Baton drummer Thierry Arpino performing in Oslo, Norway, May 2016

== Collaboration and touring ==
In 2013, Grand Baton began its collaboration with the vocalist Lisa Fischer and Maillard serves as the band's musical director and arranger. Since beginning their tour in 2014, The Ms. Lisa Fischer and Grand Baton Tour has performed in North America, Europe, Asia, Australia and New Zealand.

Grand Baton and Fischer have also performed together at several jazz festivals including The Monterey Jazz Festival in 2014, The Newport Jazz Festival in 2015 and The New Orleans Jazz & Heritage Festival in 2017.

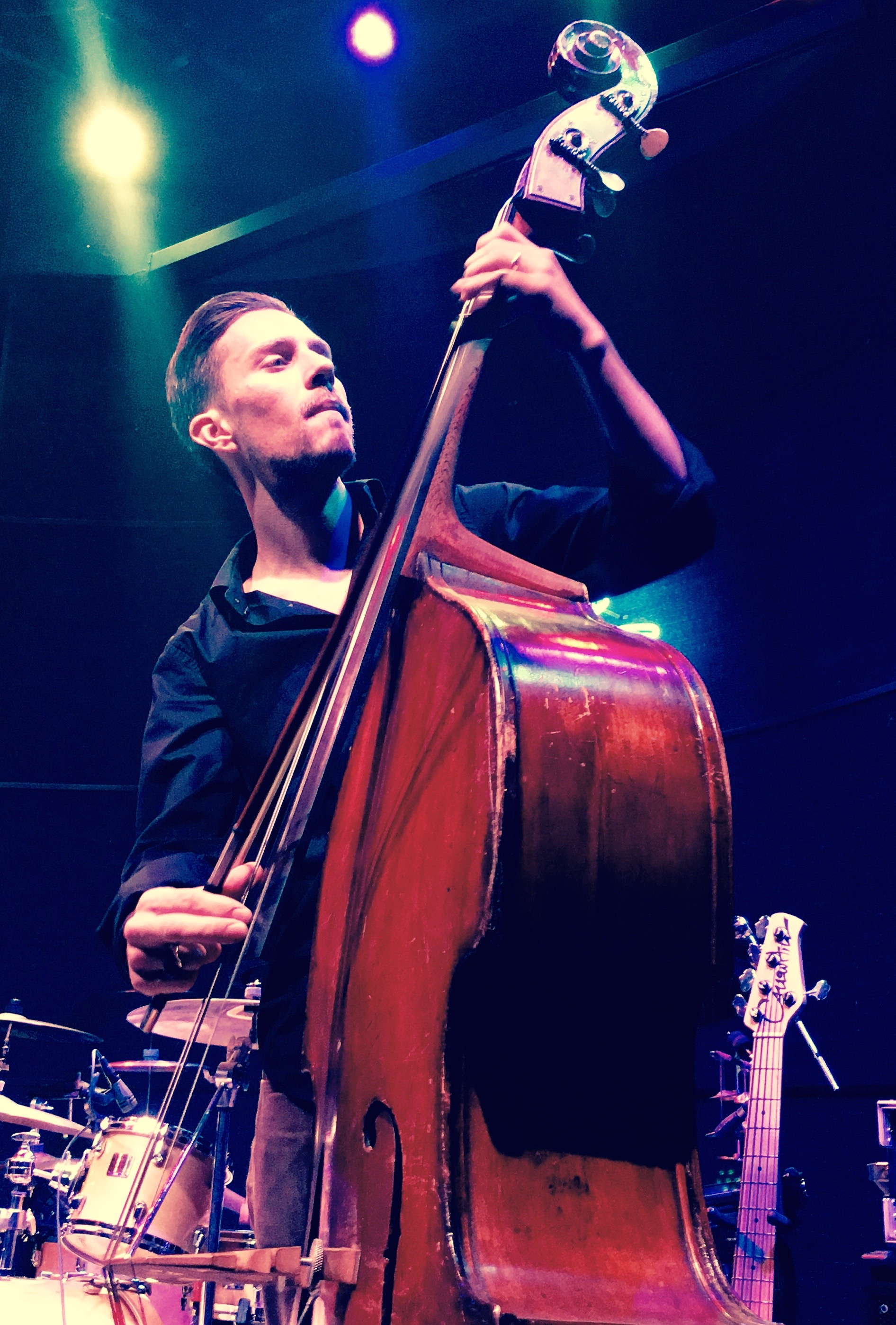
Aidan Carroll of Grand Baton performing at The Dakota Jazz Club in Minneapolis, November 2016

Grand Baton and Fischer collaborated with The Seattle Symphony in February 2018 for the musical program Just A Kiss Away in which rock and roll anthems including The Rolling Stone's "Gimme Shelter" and Led Zeppelin's "Rock and Roll" were recreated from an orchestral perspective.

== Band members ==
=== 2014 members ===
In 2014, the line-up of Grand Baton was:

Members
| Name | Instrument(s) | Role |
|---|---|---|
| JC Maillard | Guitars, sazbass, keyboards, lead vocals, backing vocals | Music director, founder |
| Thierry Arpino | Drums, percussion, cajón | Member |
| Aidan Carroll | Bass guitar, double bass, backing vocals | Member |

=== Former contributors/members ===
The former members and/or contributors of Grand Baton include the following musicians:

Past contributors
| Name | Instrument(s) |
|---|---|
| Pascal Rey | Drums |
| Stéphane Huchard | Drums |
| Arno Dolmen | Drums, ka drums |
| Philippe Makaïa | Ka drums |
| Didier Juste | Ka drums |
| Sonny Troupe | Ka drums |
| Olivier Juste | Ka drums |
| Obanilu Allende | Percussion |
| Gilmar Gomes | Percussion |
| Etienne Mbappe | Bass guitar |
| Linley Marthe | Bass guitar |
| Fabrice Fanfant | Bass guitar |
| Alexis Hadefi | Bass guitar |

== Discography ==
| Title | Details |
|---|---|
| Le Grand Baton | Release Year: 2007; Formats: CD, digital download |
| Carnal Carnival | Release Year: 2013; Formats: CD, digital download |
