= How Can I Ease the Pain =

1991 single by Lisa Fischer

Single by Lisa Fischer

from the album So Intense
- B-side: "Reachin' 4/U"
- Released: June 1, 1991
- Recorded: 1991
- Genre: R&B; soul
- Length: 5:24 (album version); 4:16 (radio edit)
- Label: Elektra
- Songwriters: Lisa Fischer; Narada Michael Walden
- Producers: Narada Michael Walden; Louis Biancaniello

Lisa Fischer singles chronology
"Glad to Be Alive" (1990)	"How Can I Ease the Pain" (1991)	"Save Me" (1991)

Music video
- "How Can I Ease the Pain" on YouTube

"How Can I Ease the Pain" is a song by American singer-songwriter Lisa Fischer, released in June 1991 by Elektra Records as the first single from her only album, So Intense (1991). It is written by Fischer with Narada Michael Walden, who produced it with associate producer Louis Biancaniello. The song spent two weeks at number-one on the US Billboard Hot R&B/Hip-Hop Songs chart. It also peaked at numbers eleven and 31 on the Billboard Hot 100 and Cash Box Top 100 charts. In 1992, the single won a Soul Train Music Award for Best R&B/Soul Single, Female and it also won a 1992 Grammy Award for Best Female R&B Vocal Performance. It remains Fischer's biggest and most well-known hit. In 1997, "How Can I Ease the Pain" was sampled by rap group Three 6 Mafia for their hit "Late Nite Tip".

== Charts ==
=== Weekly charts ===
Chart (1991)	Peak position
Australia (ARIA)	117
UK Dance (Music Week)	51
UK Club Chart (Record Mirror)	57
US Billboard Hot 100	11
US Adult Contemporary (Billboard)	16
US Hot R&B/Hip-Hop Songs (Billboard)	1
US Cash Box Top 100	31

=== Year-end charts ===
Chart (1991)	Position
US Hot R&B/Hip-Hop Songs (Billboard)	6

== See also ==
- List of number-one R&B singles of 1991 (U.S.)
