= Common Ground (Gary Burton album) =

Studio album by Gary Burton
- Released: July 4, 2011
- Studio: NYU, Steinhardt School of Culture, Education and Human Development, New York, NY
- Genre: Jazz
- Length: 1:05:56
- Label: Mack Avenue MAC1061LP
- Producer: Gary Burton

Gary Burton chronology
Quartet Live (2009)	Common Ground (2011)	Hot House (2012)

Common Ground is a studio album by American jazz vibraphonist Gary Burton. The album was recorded by his ‘new quartet’ consisting of guitarist Julian Lage, bassist Scott Colley and drummer Antonio Sanchez. Common Ground was released on July 4, 2011, via the Mack Avenue label.

== Reception ==
Professional ratings
Review scores
Source	Rating
All About Jazz	4.5/5 stars
AllMusic	4/5 stars
The Guardian	4/5 stars
The Irish Times	5/5 stars

Ken Dryden of AllMusic stated, "Common Ground stands alongside the many landmark albums in Gary Burton's vast discography." Ray Comiskey of The Irish Times noted, "Playing more or less unfashionably straight ahead, vibist Gary Burton's new quartet ... has a rare chemistry."

== Track listing ==
No.	Title	Writer(s)	Length
1.	"Late Night Sunrise"	Vadim Neselovskyi	6:32
2.	"Never the Same Way"	Scott Colley	6:57
3.	"Common Ground"	Antonio Sanchez	6:58
4.	"Was It So Long Ago?"	Gary Burton	6:12
5.	"Etude"	Julian Lage	5:46
6.	"Last Snow"	Vadim Neselovskyi	7:01
7.	"Did You Get It?"	Antonio Sanchez	5:11
8.	"My Funny Valentine"	Lorenz Hart, Richard Rodgers	7:11
9.	"Banksy"	Julian Lage	6:08
10.	"In Your Quiet Place"	Keith Jarrett	7:17
Total length:			1:05:56

== Personnel ==
Band

- Gary Burton – vibraphone, producer
- Scott Colley – bass
- Antonio Sanchez – drums
- Julian Lage – guitar

Production

- Pete Karam – engineer
- Kevin Gray – mastering
