= The Tuna Helpers =

American art folk band

- Adrienne Sneed (left), Bethany Sneed (right) photo by Chelsea Ross

Background information
- Also known as: TheTunaHelpers
- Origin: Austin, Texas
- Genres: Folk rock, gothic rock, psychedelic rock, art rock, progressive rock, indie rock
- Instruments: guitar, keyboards, percussion, violin, trombone, bass guitar
- Years active: 2000–2007
- Labels: Monkeyboy Records; Mimicry Records
- Past members: Adrienne Sneed; Bethany Sneed; Khattie Quinones; Stacy Meshbane
- Website: http://www.thetunahelpers.org

The Tuna Helpers (often, but not always, spelled TheTunaHelpers on albums and promotional materials) was an all-female American indie gothic psychedelic art folk rock band based in Austin, Texas from 2000–2007, noted for their elaborate puppetry in their stage shows and rich textures including diverse vocals, strings, trombone, and percussion. Its membership consisted of sisters Adrienne Sneed (lead vocals and guitars) and Bethany Sneed (keyboards, bells, and background vocals), Stacy Meshbane on violin, and Khattie Quinones on drums.

Their music often involves reflections on childhood, from a slightly dark but often comic perspective. Bethany also performs the songs in American Sign Language, an aspect of their live performances praised by Tucson Weekly. This element was added at Adrienne's suggestion after seeing Bethany sign Tori Amos songs at home. At local shows, Mrs. Sneed would serve cakes and host party games.

The TunaHelpers toured the U.S and Canada sharing the stages with such as Nina Hagen, TeamDresch, The Aisler Set, The Dresden Dolls, Faun Fables, Lydia Lunch, The Frogs, Adam Green, Lesbians on Ecstasy, Gretchen Phillips, Electrelane, and Bettie Serveert. The band also performed SXSW showcases four years in a row.

== Origins and lineup changes ==
The band was an outgrowth of Adrienne's desire to expand her solo act, which was originally called Adrienne and the TunaHelpers, and featured Adrienne with two fish puppets, Sushie and the Bad Cheese and Hootie Blow My Fish, who sat in front of homemade instruments. After Bethany joined, the act became Adrienne, Bethany, and the TunaHelpers. The name was shortened upon Quinones's joining. Meshbane, a friend of Adrienne, also joined the band, but stayed with it only about a year.

By their second album, Meshbane had amically departed and received a special thanks credit, Timb Harris performing violin, viola, and cello on the second album, though not credited as a full band member. The nautical theme continued with the band members' album credits as Adrienne the Anemone, Bethany the Barracuda, and Khattie the Katfish.

Guest musicians ("Tuna Helper Helpers") on the first album included Nick Smith "(the nice eel)" on trombone, and Kurtis D. Machler on bass, and the second album featured choral overdubs by Nicole Aurora and string and choral arrangements by Trey Spruance. Smith also directed the band's music videos.

== Difficulty with the name ==
Although the band never liked the name, but were unable to come up with something they liked better, on November 4, 2003 the band received an e-mail threat from attorney for General Mills proclaiming that their name was a trademark infringement on Tuna Helper. After consulting with attorneys, Adrienne responded with a flippant reply. She had previously had a restraining order put against her after taping feces to the door of an old boyfriend, which became the basis of the eponymous song.

== Recordings ==
Their first album, starring in... The Suspicious Fish, was released in 2002 by Monkeyboy Records. "Vanity Girl" of Citizen Snob found that the music lost little more than Bethany's sign language when stripped away from the stage show. She described it as "akin to watching children play--equal parts innocence, malice, curiosity, fear, and bravado," and said that as much on album as live they would remain one of her favorite bands. Shannon Lavine of The Propagander said "they incorporate current subject matter with old-fashioned folklore" and "Let them play for your two year old on her birthday", while several reviewers noted the prurience of "Bicycle", including The Austin Chronicle. The album is not, as the title may indicate, a rock opera or concept album, as it has no overarching narrative or continuity; however, as the Chronicle put it, "The Tuna Helpers have crafted their own vague mythology revolving around tuna and other sea creatures (along with all the double-entendres that may apply), but their treatment of it is too sophisticated to come across as pure schtick. Which isn't to say it's not super-fun." The album also contains a performance of Stephen Foster's "Old Folks at Home" including a surrealistic interlude written by the band fraught with food metaphors and imagery from the Easter story.

Adrienne handed a press kit to Trey Spruance at a SXSW Festival and invited him to an unofficial women's rock showcase. Although both Sneeds were ill at this performance requiring Quinones to emcee, which none of the members were happy with, Spruance loved the show, and a month later e-mailed that they were in the Web of Mimcry.

The band's second album, I'll Have What She's Having, was released on March 15, 2005. Spruance flew to Austin to record the band, and Adrienne flew to Spruance's home in Santa Cruz for album production. The new label got them into stores throughout North America, Europe, And Australia. Writing of the second album, Anna Breshears of Bitch describes their live shows as being full of puppetry and stage effects, described Sneed as having "operatic range and precision," but also being capable of "whittl[ing] her voice down to a warble of petulant protestations", and describes Quinones's drumming as "expressive." She contrasts their work with teenage gothic music, describing it as "smarter, prettier and ha[ving] a sense of humor." Dead Earnest called the album "unique, accessible, original, quality and close to brilliance..." and "a rare gem." Anna Maria Stjärnell of Collected Sounds Women in Music said she was "so impressed I'm at loss for words." Matt Wake in The Huntsville Times described their music as "something akin to nursery rhymes on acid."

== Reception ==
Reviewers frequently favorably compared the band with Kate Bush, Tori Amos, Throwing Muses, Siouxsie and the Banshees, The Roches, and Rasputina. Adrienne acknowled Bush as an influence in Indianapolis's Nuvo Newsweekly, and cited other influences as P. J. Harvey, Pat Benatar, and Heart. In the same interview, she also stated that she appreciated that her audience would sit and listen to her shows without making much noise. Matt Wake of The Huntsville Times called her act Ziggy Stardust by way of The Muppet Show. Tim Burton's name was invoked by numerous reviewers for comparison, as well.

== Dissolution ==
The band gave its final concert on February 14, 2007, and Adrienne Anemone, having dropped the article from her stage name, moved to Brooklyn, New York, pursuing a solo career (performing both band and non-band songs, as well as "Old Folks at Home") in the New York City area folk music and LGBT communities, as well as creating performance art in the New York, Philadelphia, and Washington D.C. areas. Bethany Sneed is now studying to be a Deaf-education teacher, while Khattie Quinones and Stacy Meshbane both continue to perform with local bands.

== Discography ==
=== starring in... The Suspicious Fish ===
Monkeyboy Records, 2002

1. Code
2. Restraining Order
3. Tuna Stalker
4. Christian Girl
5. Caterpillar
6. Bicycle
7. Frankenstein
8. Old Folks at Home (Stephen Foster) (hidden track)
9. Ballerina
10. Lambs
11. Chicken of the Sea
12. Evil Queen
13. Babies
14. Manatee
15. Moon Queen
16. Wake Up

=== I'll Have What She's Having ===
Mimicry Records, 2005

1. Ready to Begin
2. Hold This
3. All the Children
4. Circus Song
5. Blueberry Head
6. Oh No
7. Wait and See
8. Turtle
9. The Stars
10. Gather Your Children
11. Sticks and Stones
12. Frying Pan
13. Sea Monster
14. Halfway
15. Askew
16. Haloing Moons
