= So Intense =

Studio album by Lisa Fischer
- Released: April 30, 1991
- Recorded: 1990–1991
- Genres: R&B; soul; pop
- Length: 50:14
- Label: Elektra
- Producers: Narada Michael Walden (tracks 1, 3 & 4), Luther Vandross (tracks 2, 5, 6 & 8), Attala Zane Giles/Cornelius Mims (track 7), Arif Mardin (track 9), Raymond Jones (track 10)

Singles from So Intense
- 1. "How Can I Ease the Pain" Released: June 1, 1991; 2. "Save Me" Released: September 26, 1991; 3. "So Intense" Released: February 1992

Professional ratings
Review scores
Source	Rating
AllMusic	3.5/5 stars
Orlando Sentinel	2/5 stars

So Intense is the only studio album by American R&B singer and songwriter Lisa Fischer, released on April 30, 1991. Of the ten songs recorded for the album, "How Can I Ease the Pain", co-written by Fischer, was her biggest pop and R&B hit. It reached number 11 on the main US Hot 100 chart and number 1 on the US R&B chart. The only other single to make an impact was "Save Me", which, while failing to dent the Top 40 of the US Hot 100 (reaching number 74), came close to repeating the success of "How Can I Ease the Pain" on the R&B chart, where it peaked at number 7. The last single, the title track "So Intense", reached number 15 on the R&B chart.

== Track listing ==
No.	Title	Writer(s)	Length
1.	"Save Me"	Lisa Fischer; Narada Michael Walden	4:44
2.	"Get Back to Love"	Marcus Miller; Luther Vandross	4:32
3.	"How Can I Ease the Pain"	Fischer; Walden	5:25
4.	"So Intense"	Randy Cantor; Essra Mohawk; David Richardson; Walden	4:50
5.	"Wildflower"	Doug Edwards; David Richardson	7:32
6.	"Some Girls"	Miller; Vandross	5:25
7.	"So Tender"	Fischer; Attala Zane Giles; Cornelius Mims	4:24
8.	"Send the Message of Love"	Hubert Eaves III; Vandross	5:56
9.	"Chain of Broken Hearts"	Karen Manno; Jon Rosen	4:40
10.	"Last Goodbye"	Raymond Jones; Sami McKinney	4:34
Total length:			50:14

== Production and personnel ==
- Tracks 1, 3 & 4 produced by Narada Michael Walden; assistant producers on track 1: Claytoven Richardson and Frank Martin; assistant producer on tracks 3 and 4: Louis Biancaniello. Recorded by Marc Rayburn and David Frazier. Mixed by David Frazier. Narada Michael Walden: drums and percussion on all tracks; Claytoven Richardson and Frank Martin: keyboards on track 1; Louis Biancaniello: keyboards on tracks 1, 3 and 4; Ric Wilson: guitars on track 1.
- Tracks 2, 5, 6 and 8 produced by Luther Vandross. Tracks 2 and 6 recorded by Paul Brown and Stephen Harrison; Tracks 5 and 8 recorded by Michael White, Deb Cornish & Ray Bardani. Mixed by Ray Bardani. John "Skip" Anderson: keyboards, drums and percussion on tracks 2, 6 and 8; Buddy Williams: drums and percussion on track 5; Marcus Miller: synthesizers on tracks 5 and 8, electric bass on track 2; Georg Wadenius and Hiram Bullock: guitars on track 5; Paul Jackson Jr.: guitars on track 6; Dick Oatts: saxophone on track 5; Nick Ashford: vocal on track 5; Kevin Owens and Luther Vandross: chorus vocals on tracks 2, 5 and 8; Eugene Van Buren: chorus vocals on track 6; Brenda White-King, Cindy Mizelle and Paulette McWilliams: chorus vocals on track 8.
- Track 7 produced by Attala Zane Giles and Cornelius Mims. Recorded by Robert Macias. Mixed by Frank Clark. Attala Zane-Giles: chorus vocals and all instruments.
- Track 9 produced by Arif Mardin. Arranged by Steve Skinner. Recorded and mixed by Michael O'Reilly. Cindy Mizelle: chorus vocals. Steve Skinner: all instruments.
- Track 10 produced by Raymond Jones. Recorded and mixed by "Hill Swimmer", Randy Long and Roy Spong. Raymond Jones: piano, sequencing; Abdou M'Boup, Carol Steele: percussion.

== Charts ==
Chart (1991)	Peak position
US Billboard 200	100
US Top R&B/Hip-Hop Albums	5
