= Banquet of the Spirits =

Studio album by Cyro Baptista
- Released: March 18, 2008
- Recorded: 2007
- Genre: World music
- Length: 48:29
- Label: Tzadik; 7624
- Producer: Cyro Baptista

Cyro Baptista chronology
Love the Donkey (2005)	Banquet of the Spirits (2008)	Infinito (2009)

Banquet of the Spirits is an album by percussionist Cyro Baptista which featured the debut of the band that would become known as Banquet of the Spirits – Baptista, bassist Shanir Ezra Blumenkranz, keyboard player Brian Marsella, and drummer Tim Keiper – which was released on the Tzadik label in 2008.

== Reception ==
Professional ratings
Review scores
Source	Rating
Allmusic	4.5/5 stars

Thom Jurek of Allmusic said "Banquet of the Spirits isn't just a step forward for Baptista, it's a leap; it's the record he's been hinting at since his debut, where he interpreted the works of Heitor Villa-Lobos. And as such, it is undeniable in how provocative, powerful, and deeply enjoyable it is as a listening experience. Whether one relishes "progressive," "modern," "primitive," "art," or "pop" music, this one's for you". On All About Jazz Sean Patrick Fitzell commented that "Though lacking the costumes and overt theatrics of his Beat the Donkey ensemble, Baptista's streamlined quartet is no less engaging: constantly changing instruments and styles to crank out high-energy romps with contagious enthusiasm".

== Track listing ==
All compositions by Cyro Baptista except as indicated

1. "Tutuboli" (Baptista, Naná Vasconcelos) – 2:59
2. "Bird Boy" – 6:43
3. "Macunaima (A Hero, Warrior and Character)" – 6:42
4. "Mumakata" (Collin Walcott, Baptista) – 5:30
5. "Nana & Tom" (Baptista, Vasconcelos) – 5:44
6. "Tupinambas" – 2:14
7. "Argan" (Baptista, Hassan Ben Jaffar, Shanir Ezra Blumenkranz, Ze Mauricio) – 4:25
8. "Typing with Oswald de Andrade" – 2:36
9. "Lamento Mourisco" (Baptista, Blumenkranz) – 1:16
10. "Malinye" (Baptista, Don Cherry) – 4:41
11. "Anthropofagia" – 5:15

== Personnel ==
- Cyro Baptista – percussion, vocals
- Brian Marsella – keyboards
- Shanir Ezra Blumenkranz – oud, bass, gimbri
- Tim Keiper – drums, percussion
- Erik Friedlander – cello (tracks 1 & 6)
- Cadu Costa – acoustic guitar (track 1), castanets (track 7), background vocals (track 2, 4, 5, 10 & 11)
- Gabriel Cordeiro, Carolina Santos – background vocals (tracks 2, 4, 5, 10 & 11)
- John Zorn – alto saxophone (track 3)
- Tom-E-Tabla – tabla (track 4)
- Ze Mauricio – shakebalde (track 7)
- Hassan Ben Jaffar – vocals (tracks 7 & 9), doumbek, qrâqeb (track 7)
- Celio Balona – accordion (tracks 8 & 10)
- Lisette Santiago – little bells (track 8)
