= Vadim Neselovskyi =

Ukrainian pianist and composer

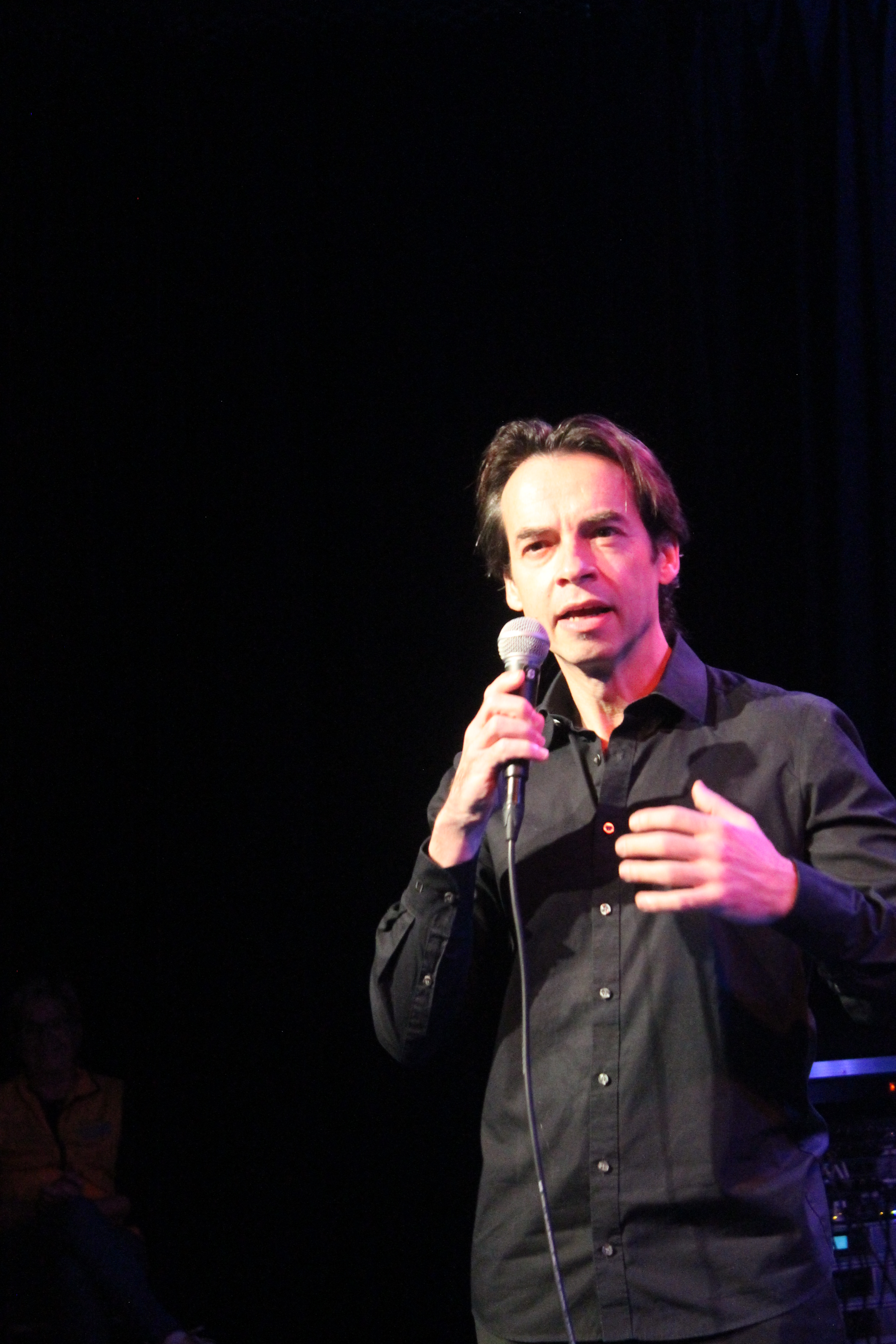
At Moldejazz 2023

Vadim Neselovskyi is a Ukrainian pianist and composer based in New York City. He currently serves as a professor of jazz piano at the Berklee College of Music in Boston, Massachusetts. Neselovskyi joined 6-Time Grammy Winner Gary Burton’s Generations Quintet of future all-stars including Julian Lage, Luques Curtis, and James Williams in 2004 and has been working as Gary Burton’s pianist and arranger for more than a decade, touring the US, Europe, and Japan. His recent appearances with Burton include Newport Jazz Festival (with Marcus Gilmore on drums), Chicago Jazz Festival and Detroit Jazz Festival. His work can be heard on three Gary Burton’s recordings: Next Generation (Concord) as a pianist, composer and arranger, If You Love Me (Cam Jazz) as an arranger and on Common Ground (Mack Avenue) as a composer. The "Next Generation" CD has reached Nr.1 on Jazzweek chart in US on April 27, 2005.

== Early life and education ==
Born on November 8, 1977, in Odessa, Ukraine, he was the youngest student at age 15 to be accepted into the Odessa Conservatory, and he then moved to Dortmund, Germany, when he was 17 years old. Shortly after arriving in Germany, Neselovskyi established himself on the local jazz scene, taking part in the Dusseldorf Jazz Rally and Leipzig Jazz Days. After a few years, he moved to the USA to further his studies at the Berklee College of Music, where he was asked to play and compose for a Berklee’s promotional recording produced by Pat Metheny that also featured Esperanza Spalding and Christian Scott. The next stage of his education took place at the Thelonious Monk Institute, where he was awarded a full scholarship as the pianist of an ensemble that was handpicked by Herbie Hancock, Wayne Shorter, and Terence Blanchard. During this time, he toured internationally with Herbie Hancock, Chaka Khan, Dee Dee Bridgewater, and Terri Lyne Carrington and shared the stage with artists such as John Scofield, Terence Blanchard, Kurt Rosenwinkel, Benny Golson, Nicholas Payton, and Steve Coleman.

== Career ==
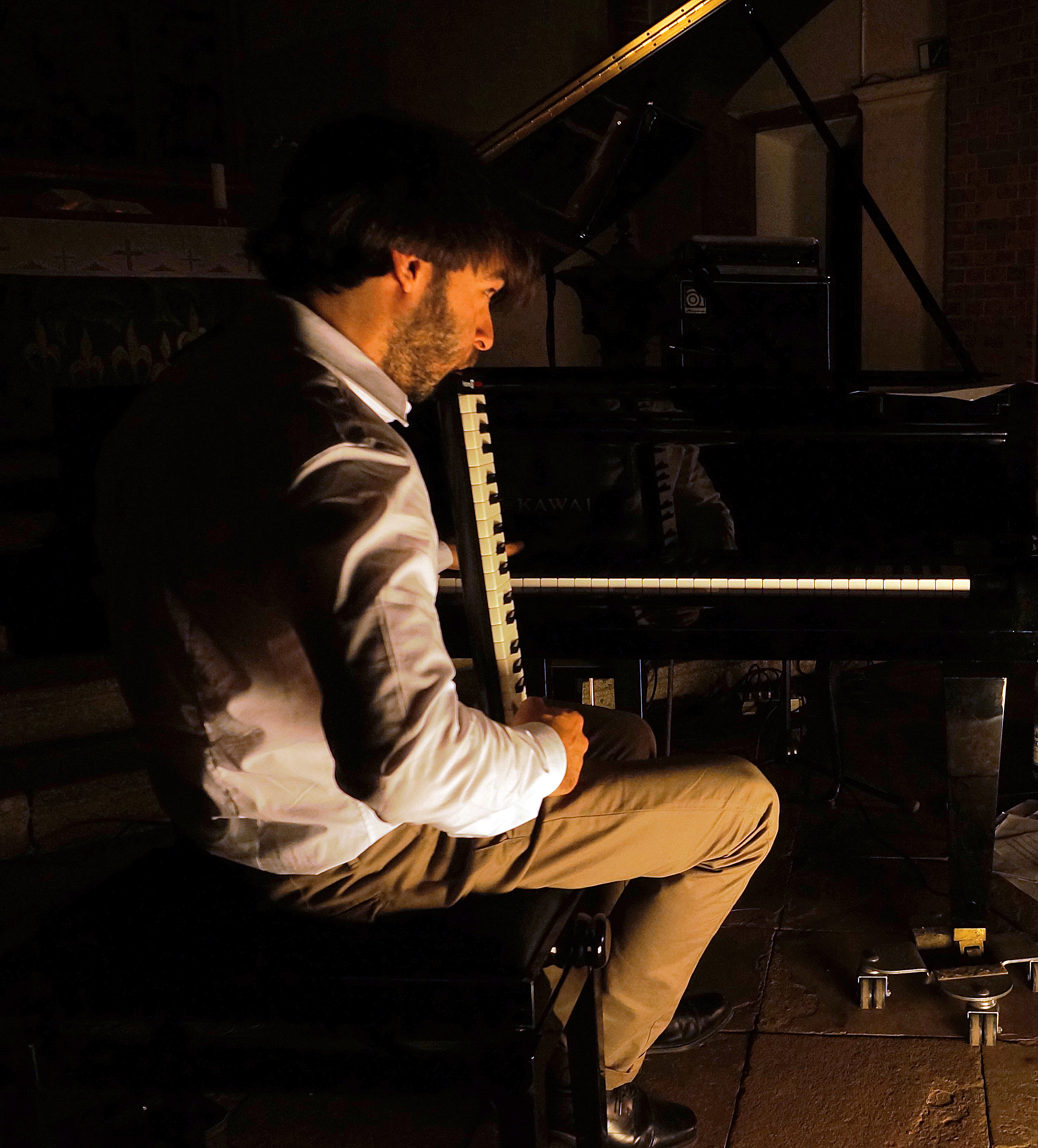
Vadim in a duet with Christian Jaroslawski in the Bugenhagenkirche Wieck in Greifswald, 2013

His solo piano album Music for September (Sunnyside Records, 2013) was produced by Fred Hersch and received a 4-star review in Down Beat.. It was named one of the "Best of 2013" by jazz critics Ted Gioia and Bob Blumenthal. Reviewers found the record “unique, surprising”, carrying “its own thoughtful signature” (Christopher Barton, LA Times), “masterful”, reaching “places few pianists could reach with any piece” (Steve Boudreau, Ottawa Citizen). Brad Farberman of Down Beat called the album's version of “Body and Soul” “gripping, unique…a reminder that standards are only as worn-out as we allow them to be”. The success of Music for September resulted in solo tours across Europe, the US, Korea, and Japan, including a rare 2-night solo piano engagement at Tokyo’s prestigious Cotton Club and a concert for Da Camera Music Society of Los Angeles. Another long-standing project, a duo with the unique Alphorn/Frenchhorn virtuoso Arkady Shilkloper (ECM Records) has been consistently touring Europe, and he also put out two albums on the German Neuklang Label.

Neselovskyi's work has been covered by Down Beat, WBGO, WKCR, and Bay Area News Group in the US, Jazzthetik, Jazzpodium, Neue Musik Zeitung, Westdeutscher Rundfunk and Norddeutscher Rundfunk in Germany, MMJazz in Korea, National Radio and TV in Ukraine, RTP Noticias in Portugal. In 2010 German Neue Musik Zeitung (NMZ) included him on its list of the best musicians of 2010. His compositions have been covered by jazz stars such as Randy Brecker, Antonio Sanchez, Scott Colley, Julian Lage, Gary Burton, and also by Symphony Orchestras in the US (Spokane Symphony and Lancaster Symphony, and Europe (Neue Philharmonie Westfalen and INSO Lviv Symphony). A composition called “San Felio” was recorded by Canadian saxophonist and Sony Classical artist Daniel Gauthier for his album Spirito Latino. This recording subsequently received an ECHO Award: Classic Without Borders. In 2016, the Festival at Sandpoint commissioned Vadim Neselovskyi to create a 50-minute four-suite suite for piano and symphony orchestra. Its premiere took place on August 14, 2016, which attracted more than a thousand listeners and received standing ovations.

== Selected discography ==
=== As a Leader ===
- Spring Song (Vadim Neselovskyi Group feat. Amanda Baisinger, Eric Bloom, Oleg Osenkov and Pedro Ito) Released 2007
- Music for September (Solo Piano), Sunnyside Records 2013, produced by Fred Hersch, liner notes by Gary Burton
- Get Up and Go (Vadim Neselovskyi Trio feat. Ronen Itzik on drums, Dan Loomis on bass and special guest vocalist Sara Serpa), JazzFamily Records, Release Date: March 2017

=== With Gary Burton ===
- Next Generation (Gary Burton Quintet feat. Julian Lage, Vadim Neselovskyi, Luques Curtis, James Williams), Concord Records 2005

=== Duo with Arkady Shilkloper ===
- Last Snow (Artbeat Records 2013)
- Krai (Neuklang 2014)
- Lustrum (Neuklang), Release Date 2017

=== As composer ===
- Common Ground (Gary Burton New Quartet feat. Julian Lage, Antonio Sanchez, Scott Colley), Mack Avenue Records 2011
- Spirito Latino (Daniel Gauthier), MDG Records

, 2005

=== As featured guest and composer ===
- Mixtura (Luba Mason Group, produced by Jimmy Haslip, appearing on Neselovskyi's composition "Last Snow" together with Randy Brecker)
