= Enter the Chicken =

Studio album by Buckethead & Friends
- Released: October 25, 2005
- Genre: Avant-garde metal; experimental rock; alternative metal; progressive metal
- Length: 41:21
- Label: Serjical Strike
- Producer: Serj Tankian; Dan Monti

Buckethead chronology
The Cuckoo Clocks of Hell (2004)	Enter the Chicken (2005)	Kaleidoscalp (2005)

Singles from Enter the Chicken
- 1. "We Are One" Released: October 2005

Enter the Chicken is the fourteenth studio album by musician Buckethead. The album was released on October 25, 2005 by Serj Tankian's label Serjical Strike. It has eleven songs, two of which are less than twenty seconds long. It contains appearances from such artists as Saul Williams, Maximum Bob, Efrem Schulz and Serj Tankian.

The album includes "We Are One", one of the few Buckethead songs for which a music video was made. The song also appears on the horror series soundtrack Masters of Horror and also in one episode. "Three Fingers" also appears on the soundtrack of the horror movie Saw II. The last song from the album, the instrumental piece "Nottingham Lace" (previously released on Buckethead's official website) closes the album, and is one of Buckethead's most popular songs, often played in concerts along with "Jordan" known from the game Guitar Hero II and "Soothsayer" from the album Crime Slunk Scene.

Buckethead promoted the album release with his "Disney World To Disney Land Tour" in October and November 2005.

A re-issue of this album was released on April 8, 2008 with an additional song called "Shen Chi".

== Album Information ==
According to Buckethead, Serj Tankian came up with the concept of an album comprising contributions from different guest vocalists and friends, hence the title.

The artwork for the album was done by long-time Buckethead collaborator Bryan "Frankenseuss" Theiss. The cover of the reissue is identical to the original, save for some colour changes.

== Reception ==
Professional ratings
Review scores
Source	Rating
Allmusic	3.5/5 stars
Jive	4/5 stars
PopMatters	6/10 stars
411mania	7/10 stars

The participation of Serj Tankian as well as many other high profile musicians caused a bigger media echo than usual Buckethead solo releases would do.

The Washington Post called the album "an entertaining disc that dabbles in genres ranging from romantic pop to extreme metal" and stated, "The shredder/space alien proves there's more behind the mask than just a quick pick and a side of slaw."

The Washington Post wrote about "street poet" Saul Williams: "[He] confidently counterbalances Hendrixian distortion on [the song]." Jive named "We Are One" and "Three Fingers" as being highlights of the album.

Michael Melchor of 411mania stated: "The hip-hop comes into play on 'Three Fingers' and what sounds [...] suspiciously like street poetry by Saul Williams before Buckethead turns up the funk and groove."

== Track listing ==
No.	Title	Writer(s)	Length
1.	"Intro"	Buckethead, Dan Monti	0:15
2.	"We Are One" (featuring Serj Tankian)	Buckethead, Monti, Serj Tankian	4:01
3.	"Botnus" (featuring Efrem Schulz)	Buckethead, Monti, Efrem Schulz	3:24
4.	"Three Fingers" (featuring Saul Williams)	Buckethead, Monti, Saul Williams	2:58
5.	"Running from the Light" (featuring Gigi and Maura Davis)	Buckethead, Monti, Ejigayehu 'Gigi' Shibabaw, Maura Davis	4:42
6.	"Coma" (featuring Azam Ali and Serj Tankian)	Buckethead, Monti, Azam Ali, Tankian	5:38
7.	"Waiting Hare" (featuring Shana Halligan and Serj Tankian)	Buckethead, Monti, Tankian	5:43
8.	"Interlude" (performed by Donald Conviser)	Buckethead, Monti	0:18
9.	"Funbus" (featuring Dirk Rogers and Keith Aazami)	Buckethead, Monti, Dirk Rogers, Keith Aazami	3:25
10.	"The Hand" (featuring Maximum Bob and Ani Maldjian)	Buckethead, Monti, Maximum Bob, Ani Maldjian	4:24
11.	"Nottingham Lace"	Buckethead, Monti	6:33
Total length:			41:25

2008 reissue bonus track
No.	Title	Writer(s)	Length
12.	"Shen Chi"	Buckethead, Monti	2:47
Total length:			44:13

== Personnel ==
- Tracks #1–7, 9–11 Recorded at John Merrick Recorder
- Track #8 Recorded at the Serjical Strike Dungeons
- Vocals for Tracks #1–4, 6–10 Recorded at the Serjical Strike Dungeons
- Produced by Serj Tankian
- Engineered, Mixed and Co-Produced by Dan Monti
- Mixed at the Binge Factory
- Vocal Engineering on Track #5 by Bill Laswell, Cam Dinunzio
- Additional Programming by Dan Monti
- Mastered by Paul Miner at Buzzbomb Studios
- A&R Coordinating by Serj Tankian and George Tonikian
- Art Direction by Bryan Theiss @ Frankenseuss Laboratories
- Buckethead's Legal Representation: Stan Diamond Esq., Diamond and Wilson

== We Are One ==
"We Are One"

Song by Buckethead

from the album Enter the Chicken
- Released: October 2005
- Recorded: John Merrick Recorder; Serjical Strike Dungeons
- Genre: Experimental metal; alternative metal
- Length: 4:01
- Label: Serjical Strike
- Songwriter(s): Buckethead; Dan Monti; Serj Tankian
- Producer(s): Serj Tankian; Dan Monti

"We Are One" was chosen to promote Enter the Chicken and thus was released as a video single.

The song features vocals by System of a Down frontman Serj Tankian who also produced the album.

=== Music video ===
The "creature" performing taxidermy on Buckethead in the song's promotional video clip.

The music video, directed by Syd Garon and Rodney Ascher, tells the story of Buckethead paying a man called "Marquis" (played by Serj Tankian) to bring him killed animals. Buckethead uses the animals to perform taxidermy on them (a real life hobby of the guitarist). Several animals appear, with flashbacks showing shortly how they died. Buckethead combines parts of all the animals together to create a new animal, which then immediately attacks Buckethead. The video has comparisons to the Frankenstein tale in that, Buckethead creates a monster, by bringing his creature to life by electrocuting it. The video then focuses on the fight of Buckethead to survive the attacks but the creation manages to kill his creator. The monster then drags Buckethead to the resurrection table, and zaps him back into being, however when he is brought back to life he discovers that his being had performed taxidermy on him, cutting off his arms and legs and replacing them with animal parts, the creature killing the maker and then bringing him back as a monster in its own right, has many layers of meaning and connotation.

=== Usage in Masters of Horror ===
The song appeared on the soundtrack of the horror series Masters of Horror and was also used in the episode Dance of the Dead of the award winning series, when main character Peggy arrives at the town of Muskeet with Jak and his friends.

=== Reception ===
The Washington Post described "We Are One" as one of the standout tracks of the album, being "concisely spastic, metallic and reminiscent of Tankian's Armenian-influenced headbanger band, System of a Down." Other reviewers also compared the song to the singer's former work with System of a Down, namely with songs from Toxicity. Jive named "We Are One" and "Three Fingers" as being highlights of the album.

The clip gained airplay on several music related television stations.

=== Personnel ===
- Buckethead – guitar
- Serj Tankian – vocals, producer
- The track was recorded on John Merrick Recorder.
- The voice track was recorded on Serjical Strike Dungeons

== Botnus ==
"Botnus"

Song by Buckethead

from the album Enter the Chicken
- Released: October 25, 2005
- Recorded: John Merrick Recorder; Serjical Strike Dungeons
- Genre: Experimental metal; alternative metal; metalcore
- Length: 3:24
- Label: Serjical Strike
- Songwriter(s): Buckethead; Dan Monti; Efrem Schulz
- Producer(s): Serj Tankian; Dan Monti

"Botnus" was inspired by the evil character Dr. Botanus on Giant Robot, a Japanese television show that heavily influenced Buckethead's work.

The original name for the song was "Dungeon Stilt". A demo version of this song appears on the DVD Secret Recipe.

=== Reception ===
The song has been described as "storm[ing] out of the gates with hellish fury letting up for only a few bars to allow the listener a quick breath" and being about "a creature that features the voice of Death By Stereo participant Efrem Schulz. Botnus may scare younger visitors, as it is very aggressive when disturbed."

The Washington Post called Buckethead's guitar work on the song as "lickety-split riffing and soloing," backed up by 411mania, writing that "[t]he metal influences are in full force as Buckethead supplies the blistering rhythm for Shulz [sic] then inserts a grand, soaring solo into the song while he's at it."

== Three Fingers ==
"Three Fingers"

Song by Buckethead

from the album Enter the Chicken
- Released: October 25, 2005
- Recorded: John Merrick Recorder; Serjical Strike Dungeons
- Genre: Alternative rock; trip hop; funk rock
- Length: 2:58
- Label: Serjical Strike
- Composer(s): Buckethead, Saul Williams
- Lyricist(s): Buckethead; Dan Monti; Saul Williams
- Producer(s): Serj Tankian; Dan Monti

"Three Fingers" features vocals by Saul Williams who was invited to perform on the track by producer Serj Tankian. As with the rest of the album's vocalists, Williams recorded his part separately from Buckethead's work, and the two never met during the process. The song was also included on the soundtrack of the horror film Saw II.

When asked about the song, Buckethead responded: "Every day is like a strange movie for me."

== Nottingham Lace ==
"Nottingham Lace"

Song by Buckethead

from the album Enter the Chicken
- Released: October 25, 2005
- Recorded: John Merrick Recorder; Serjical Strike Dungeons
- Genre: Alternative metal; funk metal; experimental metal
- Length: 6:33
- Label: Serjical Strike
- Songwriter(s): Buckethead; Dan Monti
- Producer(s): Serj Tankian; Dan Monti

"Nottingham Lace" is the last track on the album and one of Buckethead's most popular songs. It is very frequently played live at Buckethead's concerts. The song's name is derived from one of the most high quality types of lace in the world.
