= Young Buckethead =

Young Buckethead is a series of Buckethead and Deli Creeps related releases by Jas Obrecht's record label Avabella:

- Young Buckethead Vol. 1, a DVD released in 2006 and containing footage from 1990 and 1991
- Young Buckethead Vol. 2, a DVD released in 2006 and containing footage from 1990 and 1991
- Acoustic Shards, an album released in 2007 and containing recordings from 1991
- From the Coop, an album released in 2008 and containing demo recordings from 1988
