= Bucketheadland 2 =

Studio album by Buckethead
- Released: October 14, 2003
- Genre: Industrial metal, avant garde metal, experimental music, spoken Word
- Length: 58:24
- Label: ION
- Producer: Dan Monti

Buckethead chronology
Electric Tears (2002)	Bucketheadland 2 (2003)	Island of Lost Minds (2004)

Professional ratings
Review scores
Source	Rating
Allmusic	4/5 stars

Bucketheadland 2 is the tenth studio album by guitarist Buckethead. Released in 2003, it is a sequel to his debut album, Bucketheadland, a concept album about his fictional "abusement" park.

The album was nominated for the 2004 Shortlist Music Prize.

== Track listing ==
All tracks are written by Buckethead and Dan Monti.

No.	Title	Length
1.	"Welcome"	0:13
2.	"Slaughter Zone Entrance"	0:11
3.	"The Cobra's Hood"	2:58
4.	"Transportation Options"	0:51
5.	"Machete Mirage"	3:01
6.	"Slaughter Buddies Outside the Revenge Wedge"	0:21
7.	"We Cannot Guarantee Bodily Harm"	0:17
8.	"John Merrick - Elephant Man Bones Explosion"	4:53
9.	"Taxidermy Tots"	0:23
10.	"Bloody Rainbow Spiraling Sherbert Scoop"	2:55
11.	"Can You Get Past Albert?"	0:27
12.	"Vladimir Pockets' Incredible Bloated Slunk Show"	3:10
13.	"The Ballad of the Inside-Out Face"	1:05
14.	"The Battery Cage Brawls (Cage Announcer: The Ghost of Abraham Lincoln; Winner Has to Eat His Way Out)"	2:18
15.	"Ferris Wheel Apology"	0:08
16.	"Can You Help Me?"	1:02
17.	"Grimm's Sponsorship"	0:14
18.	"Realistic Coop Replica"	0:42
19.	"Frozen Brains Tell No Tales"	5:33
20.	"Rooster Landing (1st Movement) / Lime Time (2nd Movement)"	2:35
21.	"Two Pints"	0:27
22.	"Health & Safety Advisory"	2:14
23.	"Digger's Den"	3:13
24.	"One-Way Ticket to Grab Bag Alley"	0:46
25.	"Fun for You"	1:03
26.	"Carpal Tunnel Tomb Torker"	3:35
27.	"Today's Schedule"	0:08
28.	"The Corpse Plower"	3:20
29.	"Unemployment Blues"	2:05
30.	"Slaughter Zone Exit"	8:16
Total length:		58:24

=== Notes ===
- "Frozen Brains Tell No Tales" uses the same recording of Bootsy Collins singing "Buckethead's a psycho, he's a total psycho" that is used in "Want Some Slaw?", from Buckethead's second album, Giant Robot.
- "Digger's Den" begins with Bootsy Collins exclaiming the phrase "Hit me", which would later be sampled for "Bird With a Hole in the Stomach" on Buckethead's 2006 album, The Elephant Man's Alarm Clock.
- "Carpal Tunnel Tomb Torker" features Bootsy Collins shouting "I'm Cocoa for Cuckoo Puffs!", a reference to the Bucketheadland album in which he is similarly heard singing the jingle for Sugar Crisp cereal.
- Elements of the tracks "Slaughter Zone Entrance" and "Slaughter Zone Exit" would later be used in "The Ravines of Falsehood" on Buckethead's 2004 album, The Cuckoo Clocks of Hell.
- After an initial guitar riff, "Slaughter Zone Exit" consists primarily of silence, only permeated by a number of scattered samples, including many of the spoken word pieces heard throughout the album. A possible reason for this is that Buckethead wanted the longest track on the album to be exactly 8:16, matching the length of the longest track on Bucketheadland (Computer Master). This would make the two longest tracks from his debut and its sequel the same length.

== Credits ==
Per album liner notes

- Taxidermy, production, 6-string wedge & pieces by Buckethead
- Co-produced, co-written, mixed, engineered and programmed by Dan Monti
- Recorded at the Coop & the Del Rey Brewer Factory
- Voices: Bootsy Collins, Li'l Littles, Keystone Brewer, Bill Monti [the Towel], P-Sticks, Albert
- Additional drums: Brain
- Mechanical morgue: Dead
- Ferris Wheel [Page 1]: P-Sticks
- Artwork, dialogue & research: Bryan Theiss for Frankenseuss Animatronics
- Buckethead memorabilia courtesy of the Ronald L. Witherspoon Collection
- Special thanks: Bootsy, Norm, Li'l Littles, Keystone Brewer, Bill the Towel, P-Sticks, Brain, Dan Monti, Frankenseuss
- Executive producer: Norman Isaacs
