= Pinchface =

American drummer

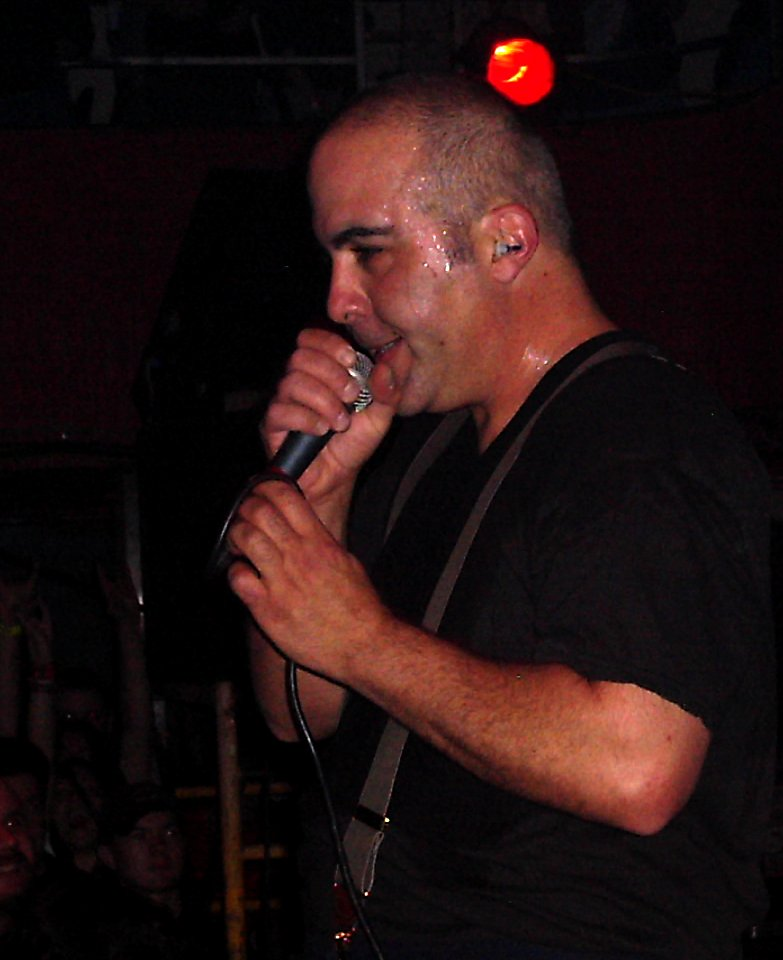
- Pinchface speaking between songs at a Buckethead show at the Southgate House, in Newport, KY

Background information
- Also known as: Pinch Pinchy, Karl, Buns of Steel, Pincher
- Born: Michael Andrew Hakopian
- Genres: Experimental rock, heavy metal
- Occupations: Drummer and real estate agent
- Instrument: Drums
- Years active: 1991–2011

Michael Andrew Hakopian, better known as Pinchface is an American drummer known for his work with the Deli Creeps, Giant Robot II, and the Cornbugs. He has also appeared on numerous Buckethead albums, such as Population Override and Giant Robot (tracks "I Come In Peace" and "Star Wars"). He has also appeared on numerous occasions in Buckethead's Binge Clip Videos. In 2006 he toured the United States with Buckethead and Delray Brewer. He also works as a real estate agent according to his Facebook page.

== Discography ==
=== With the Deli Creeps ===
- Demo Tape - 1991
- Demo Tape - 1996
- Dawn of the Deli Creeps - 2005

=== With Buckethead ===
- Giant Robot - 1994
- Population Override - 2004

=== With Gorgone ===
- Gorgone - 2005

=== With Cobra Strike ===
- 13th Scroll - 1999

=== With Cornbugs ===
- Spot the Psycho - 1999
- How Now Brown Cow - 2001
- Brain Circus - 2004
- Donkey Town - 2004

== Videography ==
- Young Buckethead Vol. 1 - 2006
- Young Buckethead Vol. 2 - 2006
