= Population Override =

Studio album by Buckethead
- Released: March 30, 2004 (CD); January, 2015 (Vinyl)
- Genre: Progressive rock, blues rock, jam rock
- Length: 55:22
- Label: ION

Buckethead chronology
| Island of Lost Minds (2004) | Population Override (2004) | The Cuckoo Clocks of Hell (2004) |

Professional ratings
Review scores
| Source | Rating |
|---|---|
| Allmusic | 4.5/5 stars |

Population Override is the twelfth studio album by Buckethead and his first full collaboration with keyboardist Travis Dickerson. The album is a tribute to the "great vinyl records of the '60s and '70s", with songs more often than not drifting into long jams.

Almost all the music is just us communicating as we play. The songs started as a riff that either I or Bucket would start playing and then we would all go from there. On some of the tracks we worked out some cord [sic] changes but a lot of them were just made up as we went. We worked out a lot of stuff as overdubs and that helped give it structure. (...) We recorded the little guitar snippets just for what they were used for, track segues.

— Travis Dickerson,

The album was written after the sessions for the Cornbugs album Brain Circus, which features Buckethead, Bill "Choptop" Moseley, Pinchface and Travis Dickerson. This album was the precursor to similar collaborative efforts like Gorgone, Chicken Noodles, and Left Hanging.

The cover shows several buildings from downtown Toronto, including the Royal York Hotel and the Canada Trust Tower.

In January 2015, the label re-issued the album on vinyl format on a limited pressing of 1000 copies. The vinyl version was originally intended to feature the album by itself, but due to the length of the album, it would not be able to fit in a single LP and would be too short for 2LPs. Instead, the label tried to find outtakes from these sessions in order to fill the gap resulting from pressing the album on 2LPs, but Dickerson explained that there was no extra material left over from these sessions. Instead, the label decided to go ahead with the re-issue by filling the gap with six bonus songs, three from the album Cobra Strike and three from Funnel Weaver.

== Track listing ==
| No. | Title | Length |
|---|---|---|
| 1. | "Unrestrained Growth" | 7:47 |
| 2. | "Too Many Humans" | 8:28 |
| 3. | "Population Override" | 8:37 |
| 4. | "Humans Vanish" | 0:33 |
| 5. | "Cruel Reality of Nature" | 3:49 |
| 6. | "A Day Will Come" | 8:34 |
| 7. | "Earth Heals Herself" | 6:38 |
| 8. | "Clones" | 4:33 |
| 9. | "Super Human" | 4:49 |
| 10. | "..." | 1:34 |
| Total length: | | 55:22 |

== Credits ==
- Buckethead - electric guitar, bass guitar
- Travis Dickerson - keyboards
- Pinchface - drums, percussion
