= Kaleidoscalp =

Studio album by Buckethead
- Released: November 22, 2005
- Genre: Experimental metal, industrial metal, alternative metal
- Length: 53:31
- Label: Tzadik
- Producer: Dan Monti and Albert

Buckethead chronology
| Enter the Chicken (2005) | Kaleidoscalp (2005) | Inbred Mountain (2005) |

Professional ratings
Review scores
| Source | Rating |
|---|---|
| Allmusic | 3.5/5 stars |

Kaleidoscalp is the fifteenth studio album by avant-garde guitarist Buckethead. The album is notable for its use of circuit bent instruments and effects, creating an overall sound that is both bizarre and unique.

Released on John Zorn's Tzadik label, the album features Zorn as an executive producer. Although a predominantly studio-based release, a number of these songs have been performed live, with Buckethead often improvising and extending over a drum track.

== Track listing ==
All tracks are written by Buckethead and Dan Monti.

| No. | Title | Length |
|---|---|---|
| 1. | "Frankenseuss Laboratories" | 4:33 |
| 2. | "Stun Pike and the Jack in the Box Head" | 4:12 |
| 3. | "Music Box Innards" | 3:46 |
| 4. | "Breakfast Cyborg" | 4:22 |
| 5. | "The Bronze Bat" | 0:38 |
| 6. | "The Last Ride of the Bozomobile" | 2:03 |
| 7. | "Rack Maintenance" | 4:35 |
| 8. | "The Sticker on Hallucinogens" | 1:41 |
| 9. | "Pylon Shift" | 4:32 |
| 10. | "Citadel" | 3:29 |
| 11. | "The Slunk, the Gutter and the Candlestick Maker" | 4:18 |
| 12. | "The Android of Notre Dame" | 3:39 |
| 13. | "She Sells Sea Shells by the Slaughterhouse" | 11:43 |
| Total length: | | 53:31 |

=== Notes ===
- "Frankenseuss Laboratories" samples a part of the "Kyrie" movement of György Ligeti's Requiem, as well as the opening computer sounds in John Carpenter's film Dark Star. The song's title is also a reference to Bryan Theiss, the artist who designed the artwork for the album and a number of Buckethead's earlier releases.
- A sequel to the song "Rack Maintenance" can be found on the 2009 album Slaughterhouse on the Prairie.
- "The Slunk, the Gutter and the Candlestick Maker" uses the same drum track as "Viravax", the 12th track on Island of Lost Minds.
- "The Android of Notre Dame" is a tribute to Pantera's guitarist Dimebag Darrell who was shot and killed during a concert. The song was first called "Dime" (a popular nickname of Darrell) and was released shortly after the incident on Buckethead's web page without any cost and later released on the album with tracks of circuit-bent instruments added to it. The song takes its name from the fifth installment in the Guinea Pig series of Japanese horror films.
- "She Sells Sea Shells by the Slaughterhouse" ends at 2:40. After 4 minutes and 36 seconds of silence an unnamed hidden track begins and leads to the end of the album.

== Credits ==
- Produced by Dan Monti and Albert
- Executive Producer: John Zorn
- Associate Producer: Kazunori Sugiyama
- Recorded at the Slaughterhouse
- Programming and mixing by Dan Monti
- Mastered by Scott Hull
- Cover art: Bryan Theiss

Special thanks to: Zorn, Bill Laswell, Frankenseuss, Del Rey Brewer, Jodorowsky's Holy Mountain, Family, Friends, Slunks and Chickens.
