= Donkey Town =

Donkey Town may refer to:

- Donkey Town, an album by Cornbugs
- Donkey Town, Surrey, a village in England
- "Donkey Town", a song from the album All the Roadrunning by Mark Knopfler and Emmylou Harris
