= The Cuckoo Clocks of Hell =

Studio album by Buckethead
- Released: April 20, 2004
- Genre: Experimental metal
- Length: 52:16
- Label: Disembodied
- Producer: Dan Monti

Buckethead chronology
Population Override (2004)	The Cuckoo Clocks of Hell (2004)	Enter the Chicken (2005)

Alternative Cover
- Alternative front cover, used on some editions of the album.

Professional ratings
Review scores
Source	Rating
AllMusic	2.5/5 stars

The Cuckoo Clocks of Hell is the thirteenth studio album by American guitarist Buckethead. It was released on April 20, 2004, via Disembodied Records.

== Track listing ==
No.	Title	Length
1.	"Descent of the Damned"	3:07
2.	"Spokes for the Wheel of Torment"	2:17
3.	"Arc of the Pendulum"	2:32
4.	"Fountains of the Forgotten"	3:22
5.	"The Treeman"	3:40
6.	"Pylegathon"	2:35
7.	"Traveling Morgue"	3:18
8.	"One Tooth of the Time Train"	3:27
9.	"Bedlam's Bluff"	3:15
10.	"Beaten with Sledges"	2:52
11.	"Woods of Suicides"	3:28
12.	"Yellowed Hide"	3:37
13.	"Moths to Flame"	3:13
14.	"The Ravines of Falsehood"	3:11
15.	"The Black Forest"	2:12
16.	"Haven of Black Tar Pitch"	3:19
17.	"The Escape Wheel"	2:52
Total length:		52:16

== Spokes for the Wheel of Torment ==
"Spokes for the Wheel of Torment"

Song by Buckethead

from the album The Cuckoo Clocks of Hell
- Released: April 20, 2004
- Recorded: John Merrick Recorder
- Genre: Alternative metal; experimental metal
- Length: 2:17
- Label: Disembodied
- Songwriters: Buckethead; Dan Monti
- Producer: Dan Monti

"Spokes for the Wheel of Torment" is the second song from the album and one of a few that have a music video (the others are "The Ballad of Buckethead" from the album Monsters and Robots, "We Are One" from Buckethead's 2005 album Enter the Chicken, "Pyrrhic Victory" by Thanatopsis, and "Viva Voltron", for the animated series Voltron).

=== Music video ===
Stylized image of Buckethead in the song's video clip

The music video was directed by Syd Garon and Eric Henry featuring additional artwork by longtime Buckethead collaborator Bryan "Frankenseuss" Theiss. The video is based on the famous triptychs by Hieronymus Bosch, The Garden of Earthly Delights, The Last Judgement, the Paradise and Hell, and The Temptation of St. Anthony.

The music video starts in the depths of hell where Buckethead is carried by a flying beast which releases him. Buckethead ends in the hands of the "Prince of Hell" from The Garden of Earthly Delights triptych.

Buckethead gets devoured by the creature before shortly being deficated by it, where his head, arms and a lute he was holding gets themselves stuck on a tree where Buckethead starts to play a part of the song alongside a band of demons. While he plays, multiple people are shown being tortured in several ways. While this is happening, the "Tree Man" from the same triptych is shown. Throughout the music video, the camera changes multiple times to a city on fire from a distance, showing small details of people being whipped or beaten. An angel can also be seen being expelled from heaven from above the burning city.

Buckethead keeps playing and when the song finishes the screen goes black and the credits appear showing The Seven Deadly Sins and the Four Last Things. After the credits the camera pulls to show the credits were on a circular shape. During this time, parts of the song "Traveling Morgue" from the same album are played. The screen goes black again and the words "Beware, Beware, God Sees" appear.

The clip was shown at some film festivals around the world, such as the Sydney Film Festival, amongst others.

The music video has been officially made available in 2006, as part of the Anxious Animation DVD release as well as Buckethead's own video compilation Secret Recipe.

== Personnel ==
=== Performers ===
- Buckethead — acoustic guitar, electric guitar, bass guitar
- Brain — drums, percussion

=== Production ===
- Dan Monti — producer, engineer, mixing, programming
- Robert Hadley — mastering
- Bryan Theiss — artwork
- P-Sticks — artwork (back cover, inside portrait of library)
- Steven Morrison — title inspiration
