= In Search of The =

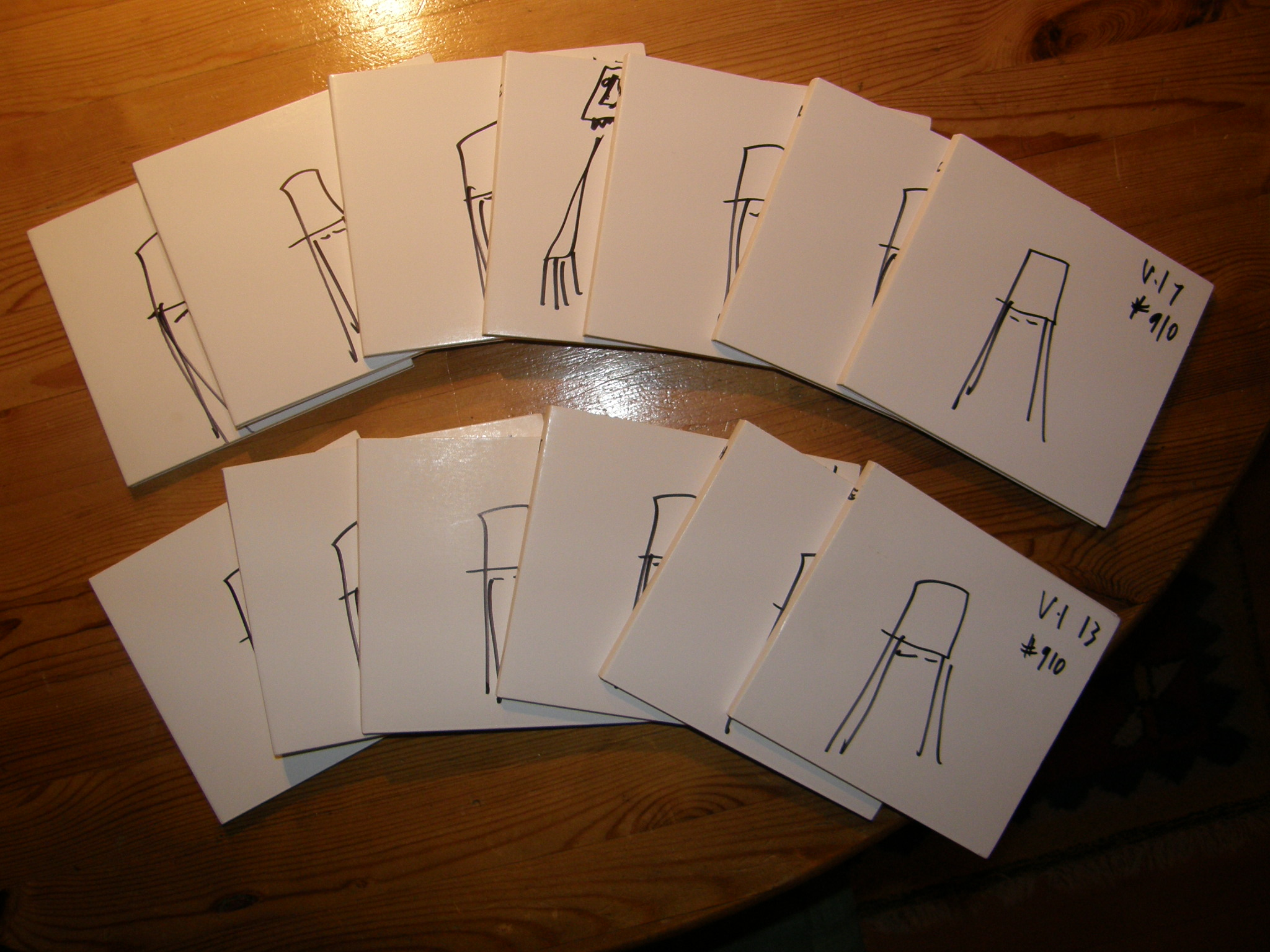

Box set by Buckethead
- Released: February 21, 2007
- Recorded: 2006–2007
- Genres: Jazz fusion, ambient, progressive rock, experimental, funk rock, improvisational, electronic rock, dark ambient
- Length: I: 44:19; N: 44:49; S: 43:27; E: 42:30; A: 42:27; R: 45:00; C: 41:13; H: 41:37; O: 42:39; F: 42:31; T: 42:29; H: 49:44; E: 45:01; Total: 567:37
- Label: TDRS Music
- Producer: Buckethead

Buckethead chronology
Crime Slunk Scene (2006)	In Search of The (2007)	Pepper's Ghost (2007)

In Search of The is a set of thirteen albums by Buckethead, released on February 21, 2007. Each was initially personally numbered and monogrammed by Buckethead himself. No two sets were the same, as the covers were hand-drawn and unique from one another. It is considered a special release, making it the first of Buckethead's albums to be referred to as such.

According to Travis Dickerson, Buckethead's longtime producer:

...this is not a regular CD. It's hand made, hand burned. The cover is whatever is deemed to be written on it. This is not a manufactured deal, each one is different and will be numbered and monogramed. No two of these will be the same. I have never heard of an artist doing something like this. This is as direct from the artist to the fan as I have ever heard of. As far as the content, I don't know, but the mystery around it is no surprise. Again, I can't speculate because I don't want to mislead anyone, I just don't know anymore. My gut sense is this is a conceptual work, a piece of art. It could contain anything.

The original project started as an even more ambitious project than the one released. Dickerson explained that the project consisted of a series of 13-CD box sets that when completed and stacked would spell out the phrase "In Search of the Disembodied Sounds". However, due to the popular demand of this section of the project, the original idea was scrapped, as it became an exhausting endeavor to cover the demand for this box set. The original box set could be purchased as either a box set or separately. There are a total of 92 songs in the set ranging in length from 0:33 to 19:45, not including "Vol. 13: E" which is one unbroken 45-minute track.

Buckethead drew the covers on each set of In Search of The until he reached the 1000th copy. However, mistakes were made in the numbering, and ranges of numbers were skipped during the production of the personalized edition of the box set. Dickerson estimates that the actual number of box sets produced might be around 800 copies with the final number written being 1000. All further copies available are no longer hand-made and feature the same artwork from set to set.

== Track listing ==
Vol. 1: I
No.	Title	Length
1.	"Track 1"	0:54
2.	"Track 2"	14:51
3.	"Track 3"	2:58
4.	"Track 4"	2:31
5.	"Track 5"	0:41
6.	"Track 6"	15:02
7.	"Track 7"	1:44
8.	"Track 8"	5:33
Total length:		44:19

Vol. 2: N
No.	Title	Length
1.	"Track 1"	1:26
2.	"Track 2"	10:49
3.	"Track 3"	2:58
4.	"Track 4"	2:09
5.	"Track 5"	15:49
6.	"Track 6"	3:18
7.	"Track 7"	6:04
8.	"Track 8"	2:16
Total length:		44:49

Vol. 3: S
No.	Title	Length
1.	"Track 1"	14:51
2.	"Track 2"	2:16
3.	"Track 3"	3:48
4.	"Track 4"	7:32
5.	"Track 5"	4:24
6.	"Track 6"	10:31
Total length:		43:37

Vol. 4: E
No.	Title	Length
1.	"Track 1"	3:20
2.	"Track 2"	7:07
3.	"Track 3"	9:02
4.	"Track 4"	3:29
5.	"Track 5"	5:21
6.	"Track 6"	3:29
7.	"Track 7"	3:58
8.	"Track 8"	6:39
Total length:		42:30

Vol. 5: A
No.	Title	Length
1.	"Track 1"	10:35
2.	"Track 2"	1:14
3.	"Track 3"	4:48
4.	"Track 4"	10:11
5.	"Track 5"	5:00
6.	"Track 6"	1:40
7.	"Track 7"	1:58
8.	"Track 8"	2:54
9.	"Track 9"	4:03
Total length:		42:27

Vol. 6: R
No.	Title	Length
1.	"Track 1"	19:45
2.	"Track 2"	3:42
3.	"Track 3"	4:30
4.	"Track 4"	1:11
5.	"Track 5"	15:46
Total length:		45:00

Vol. 7: C
No.	Title	Length
1.	"Track 1"	2:58
2.	"Track 2"	16:40
3.	"Track 3"	4:14
4.	"Track 4"	4:20
5.	"Track 5"	1:52
6.	"Track 6"	11:03
Total length:		41:13

Vol. 8: H
No.	Title	Length
1.	"Track 1"	10:20
2.	"Track 2"	2:26
3.	"Track 3"	5:27
4.	"Track 4"	9:55
5.	"Track 5"	2:30
6.	"Track 6"	0:33
7.	"Track 7"	3:32
8.	"Track 8"	4:36
9.	"Track 9"	2:14
Total length:		41:37

Vol. 9: O
No.	Title	Length
1.	"Track 1"	9:23
2.	"Track 2"	4:23
3.	"Track 3"	5:18
4.	"Track 4"	16:52
5.	"Track 5"	6:37
Total length:		42:39

Vol. 10: F
No.	Title	Length
1.	"Track 1"	5:13
2.	"Track 2"	9:35
3.	"Track 3"	6:45
4.	"Track 4"	1:13
5.	"Track 5"	6:45
6.	"Track 6"	3:36
7.	"Track 7"	7:13
8.	"Track 8"	2:07
Total length:		42:31

Vol. 11: T
No.	Title	Length
1.	"Track 1"	2:56
2.	"Track 2"	4:21
3.	"Track 3"	1:10
4.	"Track 4"	4:04
5.	"Track 5"	6:10
6.	"Track 6"	3:14
7.	"Track 7"	3:24
8.	"Track 8"	3:50
9.	"Track 9"	4:05
10.	"Track 10"	4:25
11.	"Track 11"	4:46
Total length:		42:29

Vol. 12: H
No.	Title	Length
1.	"Track 1"	3:12
2.	"Track 2"	10:48
3.	"Track 3"	2:15
4.	"Track 4"	10:16
5.	"Track 5"	2:57
6.	"Track 6"	3:33
7.	"Track 7"	1:19
8.	"Track 8"	15:19
Total length:		49:44

Vol. 13: E
No.	Title	Length
1.	"Track 1"	45:01
Total length:		45:01

=== Notes ===
- "Vol. 2, Track 1" samples the drumbeat from "They're Coming to Take Me Away, Ha-Haaa!" by Napoleon XIV.
- "Vol. 2, Track 8" is identical to "Vol. 3, Track 2".
- "Vol. 4, Track 4" contains an extended background beatbox session, possibly by Buckethead.
- "Vol. 6, Track 1" (the second longest song in the boxset) is one impromptu guitar solo played over a continuous drum pattern.
- "Vol. 7, Track 5" ends in 10 seconds of silence, possibly indicating that "Vol. 7, Track 6" is meant to be a hidden track.
- "Vol. 10, Track 7" ends at 1:41, followed by an extremely low hum that is only heard when the volume is turned up. This remains until the end of the song.
- "Vol. 11, Track 4" begins with a 1-minute, 25 second piano looping followed by guitar and drum work.
- "Vol. 13, Track 1" is a single unbroken track and is Buckethead's single longest song. It has a 0:30 drum intro (laced with a bit of guitar buzzing) followed by a short pause, then the drumbeat from "They're Coming to Take Me Away, Ha-Haaa!" is sampled and plays for the entire remainder of the track. Atop this are typical Buckethead guitar solos incorporating pinch harmonics, distorted low notes and fast pick movements. At 26:52, with the drum beat still playing, the song changes to a more pleasant and less complex tone, reminiscent of Buckethead's earlier song "I Love My Parents". Then, without warning, the song pulls straight back into frenetic soloing at 28:58.
- Vols. 4, 10 & 11 are the only albums in the set not to contain a song longer than ten minutes. However, Vols. 4 & 10 both contain tracks between nine and ten minutes. Vol. 11's longest track length is just 6:10. This would also explain the fact that, at eleven tracks, Vol. 11 has more tracks than any of the other albums. It is also the only volume in the set to have a double digit track amount.

== Credits ==
- Buckethead — acoustic guitar, electric guitar, bass guitar, keyboards, piano, beatbox, drums, percussion
