= From the Coop =

Compilation album by Buckethead
- Released: March 9, 2008
- Recorded: October 1988
- Genre: Avant-garde, experimental rock
- Length: 43:15
- Label: Avabella
- Producer: Jas Obrecht

Buckethead chronology
Cyborg Slunks (2007)	From the Coop (2008)	Albino Slug (2008)

Professional ratings
Review scores
Source	Rating
Allmusic	3/5 stars

From the Coop is Buckethead's third special release. It consists of songs from early demo tapes that Buckethead recorded when he was around 19 years old. A final cassette made with all 3 demo cassettes put together was made in 2000 for a CD release that wouldn't happen for another 8 years. As with Acoustic Shards, this album is more of a specialty release rather than his latest studio effort.

== Track listing ==
All tracks are written by Buckethead, except for "Malagueña" composed by Ernesto Lecuona, "La Grima", written by Francisco Tárrega and Hog Bitch Stomp by Lester Flatt and Earl Scruggs.

No.	Title	Length
1.	"Disembodied Part 1"	3:27
2.	"Disembodied Part 2"	4:44
3.	"Hog Bitch Stomp"	0:36
4.	"Malagueña" (Traditional)	1:54
5.	"Space Mountain"	3:10
6.	"Excerpt #1"	1:39
7.	"Excerpt #2"	0:52
8.	"Excerpt #3"	0:37
9.	"Excerpt #4"	0:54
10.	"Eraserhead"	2:31
11.	"La Grima"	1:51
12.	"Funk Tune"	3:50
13.	"Funkin' Freak"	2:23
14.	"Hog Bitch Stomp"	1:25
15.	"Return of Augustus Gloop"	4:32
16.	"Malagueña" (Traditional)	1:59
17.	"Lunartics"	0:51
18.	"Scalpel Sled"	3:27
19.	"Scraps"	2:33
Total length:		43:15

== Credits ==
- Buckethead - Guitar, bass, drum machine
- Jas Obrecht - Producer
- Ken Hood - Audio engineering
- John Edmonds - Original engineer in 1988
