= Bermuda Triangle (album) =

Studio album by Buckethead
- Released: July 23, 2002
- Genre: Hip hop, funk, ambient, electronic rock, avant-garde music
- Length: 49:32
- Label: Catalyst
- Producer: Extrakd

Buckethead chronology
Funnel Weaver (2002)	Bermuda Triangle (2002)	Electric Tears (2002)

Professional ratings
Review scores
Source	Rating
Allmusic	4/5 stars
Blender	3/5 stars

Bermuda Triangle is the eighth studio album by Buckethead. The album is primarily an electronica-based collaboration with Extrakd, who also produced and mixed the album.

The album has been described as an "instrumental underground hip-hop/electro-funk fantasia" and "snippets of blazing metal, washes of delayed patterns, relaxed lines matched with stuttering drums, and vice versa", dealing with several Bermuda Triangle incidents and other sea/sailor related themes.

The album was recorded on a portable multi-track recorder.

== Track listing ==
- All tracks written by Buckethead and Extrakd.

No.	Title	Length
1.	"Intro"	0:34
2.	"Davy Jones Locker"	0:56
3.	"Flight 19"	1:48
4.	"Mausoleum Door"	3:29
5.	"Sea of Expanding Shapes"	4:24
6.	"The Triangle (Part I): Extrakd"	1:16
7.	"Bionic Fog"	2:01
8.	"Forbidden Zone"	2:15
9.	"Telegraph Land of the Crispies"	1:53
10.	"Pullin' the Heavy"	2:55
11.	"Phantom Lights"	2:38
12.	"Jabbar on Alcatrazz Avenue"	3:18
13.	"BEESTRO Fowler"	3:01
14.	"Splintered Triplet"	2:36
15.	"Whatevas"	2:15
16.	"Sucked Under"	4:22
17.	"Isle of Dead"	3:14
18.	"The Triangle (Part II)"	3:19
19.	"911 "	3:18
Total length:		49:32

=== Notes ===
- "Mausoleum Door" includes a sample from the 1979 movie Phantasm.
- "Isle of Dead" includes a sample from the 1975 movie Death Race 2000.
- "911" was recorded on September 11, 2001. Buckethead said: "If the world is going to blow up, I may as well go out soloing."

== Personnel ==
Performers

- Buckethead - electric guitar, bass guitar (all tracks, except "Sucked Under")
- Extrakd - MPC 3000 bass, SH101 turntable, Roland SP-808

Additional Musicians

- Bobafett - bass guitar
- Brain - drums, percussion
