= Crime Slunk Scene =

Studio album by Buckethead
- Released: September 15, 2006 (CD); August 1, 2017 (vinyl)
- Genre: Funk metal; avant-garde; experimental metal; hard rock
- Length: 44:21 (CD version); 38:32 (vinyl version)
- Label: Bucketheadland
- Producer: Dan Monti

Buckethead chronology
The Elephant Man's Alarm Clock (2006)	Crime Slunk Scene (2006)	In Search of The (2007)

Professional ratings
Review scores
Source	Rating
The Chicago Maroon	Positive

Crime Slunk Scene is the eighteenth studio album by Buckethead and his fourth tour-only album. It was originally only sold on his 2006 tour but was later made available on Travis Dickerson's record label, TDRS music, until it eventually went out of print.

== Background ==
The track "Soothsayer" (dedicated to Buckethead's late aunt) has become one of his more popular songs and is frequently played live. "Soothsayer" was voted third best guitar solo of the 2000s by the Ultimate Guitar community. Loudwire described it as "smoothest legato shreds of all-time". VH1 placed it 8th on the list of "20 Greatest Heavy Metal Instrumentals". The song was later included as downloadable content on Guitar Hero III: Legends Of Rock. On April 27, 2017, Buckethead announced a vinyl format of this album through his Buckethead Pikes label, marking the first time since its inception that the label released a non-Pike album. This version excludes the final two tracks ("Mecha Gigan" and "Slunk Parade AKA Freaks in the Back") and is offered in three editions. The first is a regular vinyl, a second signed and numbered format, and a third limited edition package including the previous, plus a signed photo and poster, a guitar pick, and a sticker. The vinyl reissue was released on August 1.

== Track listing ==
=== CD version ===
No.	Title	Length
1.	"King James"	3:57
2.	"Gory Head Stump 2006: The Pageant of the Slunks"	5:31
3.	"The Fairy and the Devil"	2:57
4.	"Buddy Berkman's Ballad"	3:40
5.	"Mad Monster Party"	3:24
6.	"Soothsayer" (Dedicated to Aunt Suzie)	9:04
7.	"Col. Austin VS Col. Sanders AKA Red Track Suit"	3:22
8.	"We Can Rebuild Him"	3:36
9.	"Electronic Slight of Hand"	2:57
10.	"Mecha Gigan"	2:39
11.	"Slunk Parade AKA Freaks in the Back"	3:14
Total length:		44:21

=== Vinyl version ===
No.	Title	Length
1.	"King James"	3:57
2.	"Gory Head Stump 2006: The Pageant of the Slunks"	5:31
3.	"The Fairy and the Devil"	2:57
4.	"Buddy Berkman's Ballad"	3:40
5.	"Mad Monster Party"	3:24
6.	"Soothsayer" (Dedicated to Aunt Suzie)	9:04
7.	"Col. Austin VS Col. Sanders AKA Red Track Suit"	3:22
8.	"We Can Rebuild Him"	3:36
9.	"Electronic Slight of Hand"	2:57
Total length:		38:32

== Credits ==
- Dan Brewer Monti – programming and production
- Buckethead – bionic cattleprod
- Travis Dickerson – additional guitar recording
- Chris Jones – slunkwrangler
- P-Sticks – documentation

== Release history ==
Region	Date	Label	Format	Notes
US	September 15, 2006	Bucketheadland	CD	1st edition
US	April 12, 2007	Bucketheadland	CD	2nd edition
US	August 1, 2017	Buckethead Pikes	Vinyl	Standard edition
US	August 1, 2017	Buckethead Pikes	Vinyl	Signed and numbered edition
US	August 1, 2017	Buckethead Pikes	Vinyl	Limited edition
