= Electric Tears =

Studio album by Buckethead
- Released: October 8, 2002
- Genre: Ambient, new age, blues, jazz
- Length: 1:10:28
- Label: Metastation
- Producer: Buckethead and Janet Rienstra

Buckethead chronology
Bermuda Triangle (2002)	Electric Tears (2002)	Bucketheadland 2 (2003)

Professional ratings
Review scores
Source	Rating
Allmusic	3.5/5 stars
Rolling Stone	2/5 stars

Electric Tears is the ninth studio album by Buckethead. It is considered one of his most emotional and introspective albums, bearing many similarities to his previous release Colma. The entire album is played solely on acoustic and electric guitar.

In 2010, the album was released directly from TDRS Music. The album Electric Sea is a direct sequel to this album, released in 2012.

The Ultimate Guitar community ranked the album 12th on the list of "25 Greatest Instrumental albums of all time".

== Track listing ==
All tracks are written by Buckethead, except for “Sketches Of Spain”, which is a tribute to Miles Davis' musical piece “Adagio” (Concierto de Aranjuez) from the album of the same name, originally written by Joaquín Rodrigo.

No.	Title	Length
1.	"All in the Waiting"	3:41
2.	"Sketches of Spain" (For Miles)	4:03
3.	"Padmasana"	11:36
4.	"Mustang"	5:36
5.	"The Way to Heaven"	5:48
6.	"Baptism of Solitude"	6:07
7.	"Kansas Storm"	5:31
8.	"Datura"	5:36
9.	"Mantaray"	4:08
10.	"Witches on the Heath"	2:38
11.	"Angel Monster"	5:05
12.	"Electric Tears"	5:29
13.	"Spell of the Gypsies"	5:10
Total length:		1:10:28

== Credits ==
- Buckethead - acoustic guitar, electric guitar, production
- Janet Rienstra - production
- Dom Camardella - mixing, mastering, engineering, co-production
- Robert Hadley - mastering
