= Bucketheadland =

Studio album by Buckethead
- Released: February 5, 1992
- Recorded: 1991–1992
- Genre: Experimental rock, avant-garde, electronic rock, funk metal, power metal
- Length: 58:21
- Language: English, Japanese
- Label: Avant
- Producer: Bootsy Collins

Buckethead chronology
Bucketheadland Blueprints (1991)	Bucketheadland (1992)	Giant Robot (1994)

Professional ratings
Review scores
Source	Rating
Allmusic	3/5 stars

Bucketheadland (stylized as バケットヘッドランド) is the debut studio album by American guitarist and songwriter Buckethead. It was released on John Zornʼs Japanese record label, Avant, in 1992. It features several samples of the 1960s Japanese television series, Giant Robot, amongst guitar riffs and several fast, technical solos. The concept of the album is a tour around the construction of Bucketheadʼs fictional "abusement" park, “Bucketheadland”. Because of this, the album is divided into sections that relate to distinct areas of the park. A sequel was released in 2003, simply titled Bucketheadland 2.

Guitar World credited the album as "ushering in [a] new era of virtuosity" in electric guitar playing while ranking its release the 45th greatest moment in electric guitar history.

== Track listing ==
=== Disc One ===
- Intro (3:21)

No.	Title	Writer(s)	Length
1.	"Park Theme"	Buckethead	3:21

- Giant Robot (9:17)

No.	Title	Writer(s)	Length
2.	"Interlude"	Buckethead	0:27
3.	"Giant Robot Theme"	Takeo Yamashita	4:16
4.	"Enter Guillatine"	Buckethead	0:32
5.	"Giant Robot Vs. Guillatine"	Buckethead	4:02

- Bucketbots Jig (3:19)

No.	Title	Writer(s)	Length
6.	"Bucketbots Jig"	Buckethead	0:28
7.	"Enter Slipdisc"	Buckethead	1:53
8.	"Bansheebot Vs. Buckethead"	Buckethead	0:58

- Slaughter Zone (23:25)

No.	Title	Writer(s)	Length
9.	"The Haunted Farm"	Buckethead	2:42
10.	"Hook and Pole Gang"	Buckethead	1:07
11.	"Cattle Prod"	Buckethead	0:40
12.	"Phantom Monk"	Buckethead	1:45
13.	"The Rack"	Buckethead	0:29
14.	"Nosin'"	Buckethead	1:21
15.	"Gorey Head Stump"	Buckethead	1:32
16.	"Sterling Scapula"	Buckethead	0:48
17.	"Skid's Looking Where"	Buckethead	1:08
18.	"Steel Wedge"	Buckethead	1:22
19.	"Wonka in Slaughter Zone"	Buckethead	1:30
20.	"Nosin' Part 2"	Buckethead	0:40
21.	"Diabolical Minds"	Buckethead	1:32
22.	"Alice in Slaughterland"	Buckethead	1:16
23.	"Bleeding Walls"	Buckethead	0:21
24.	"Buddy on a Slab"	Buckethead	1:12
25.	"Buddy in the Graveyard"	Buckethead	1:02
26.	"Oh Jeez..."	Buckethead	1:21
27.	"Funeral Time"	Buckethead	1:39

- Computer Master (8:16)

No.	Title	Writer(s)	Length
28.	"Computer Master"	Buckethead	8:16

- Virtual Reality (3:35)

No.	Title	Writer(s)	Length
29.	"Part 1"	Bootsy Collins	2:01
30.	"Part 2"	Bootsy Collins	1:34

- Home Run Derby (5:18)

No.	Title	Writer(s)	Length
31.	"Interlude"	Buckethead	0:33
32.	"Main Theme"	Buckethead	4:45

- I Love My Parents (1:38)

No.	Title	Writer(s)	Length
33.	"I Love My Parents"	Buckethead	1:38
Total length:			58:25

=== Disc Two (Remixes) ===
No.	Title	Writer(s)	Length
1.	"Park Theme Extension"	Buckethead	5:42
2.	"Guillatine Battle"	Buckethead	0:52
3.	"Giant Robot Theme"	Takeo Yamashita	1:45
4.	"Robot Dance"	Bootsy Collins	1:02
5.	"Virtual Reality"	Bootsy Collins	3:04
6.	"Bansheebot Bop"	Buckethead	1:02
7.	"Baseball Buddy"	Buckethead	3:17
Total length:			16:47

== Credits ==
All compositions by Buckethead, Katella Music, BMI; except "Virtual Reality" composed by Bootsy Collins, Rubber Band Music, BMI and "Giant Robot Theme" composed by Takeo Yamashita. The term "Oh Jeez..." was inspired by Maximum Bob.

- Recorded at "Bootzilla Studios"
- Engineered by "Casper and Herbie"
- Mastered by Howie Weinberg
- Produced by Bootsy Collins
- Executive producers: John Zorn & Disk Union
- Associate producer: Kazunori Sugiyama
- All photos by Thi-Linh Le
- Designed by Tomoyo TL
- Photo-Typesetting by Strong Silent Type
