= Anatomize =

Studio album by Thanatopsis
- Released: February 17, 2006
- Genres: Progressive rock, experimental rock, art rock
- Length: 55:43
- Label: TDRS
- Producer: Travis Dickerson

Thanatopsis chronology
Axiology (2003)	Anatomize (2006)

Professional ratings
Review scores
Source	Rating
Wilson & Alroy	2/5 stars
Allmusic	positive

Anatomize is the third album by American progressive rock band Thanatopsis, released on February 17, 2006.

== Track listing ==
All tracks are written by Travis Dickerson and Buckethead.

No.	Title	Length
1.	"Counter Clockwise"	5:41
2.	"Break Even Point"	4:09
3.	"Vitreous Humor"	5:59
4.	"Pollyanna"	8:07
5.	"Prolix Mood"	4:43
6.	"Common Ground"	6:31
7.	"Unnerved"	4:31
8.	"Simper"	4:12
9.	"Broca's Area"	4:52
10.	"Cross Section"	6:58

== Personnel ==
- Buckethead – guitars
- Travis Dickerson – keyboards
- Ramy Antoun – drums
