= Extrakd =

- Also known as: "Xtrakd" "Xtraked"
- Genres: Hip hop, rock, experimental
- Instrument: Turntables
- Years active: 1995–present
- Labels: ION, CyberOctave, Innerhythmic

Extrakd, also called Xtrakd and Xtraked is an American producer and DJ. He was a member of projects El Stew, No Forcefield, Gonervill and worked with Bill Laswell's Material (Intonarumori, 1999), experimental guitarist Buckethead (Colma, 1998 and Bermuda Triangle, 2002), Guns N' Roses-drummer Bryan "Brain" Mantia (Fullcone), DJ Disk (Ancient Termites, 1998) and D-Styles of the Invisibl Skratch Piklz and the Beat Junkies (Return To Planetary Deterioration, 2001).

Additionally he contributed to many Punk rock and Hip hop projects like The Lost Tribe, T.H.T.S.L.E.E. and Jam Republic. He is joint owner of Tyrell Studios in Oakland, California.

== Discography (partial) ==
- Pure Liquid Bass (1995, on Flavor Innovator)
- Marsupial's Belly Flop Breaks (1997, with DJ Disk)
- Disembodied (1997, with Death Cube K)
- No Hesitation (1999, with El Stew)
- Audio Men (2000, with Eddie Def as Double E)
- Gonervill (2001, with Gonervill)
- KFC Skin Piles (2001, with Buckethead)
