= Acoustic Shards =

Compilation album by Buckethead
- Released: May 31, 2007
- Recorded: July 2, 1991
- Genre: Acoustic
- Length: 52:01
- Label: Avabella

Buckethead chronology
Pepper's Ghost (2007)	Acoustic Shards (2007)	Decoding the Tomb of Bansheebot (2007)

Professional ratings
Review scores
Source	Rating
Allmusic	3.5/5 stars

Acoustic Shards is Buckethead's second special release. It consists of acoustic recordings culled from tapes that were reportedly recorded on July 2, 1991, when Buckethead was 22 years of age.

The album was released on May 31, 2007, by Jas Obrecht, through his label Avabella, who also released the DVDs Young Buckethead Vol. 1 and Young Buckethead Vol. 2. The album was engineered by Tyler Stipe

"For Mom" was first released officially on the album Colma (1998) and "Who Me?" followed on Monsters and Robots (1999).

== Track listing ==
No.	Title	Length
1.	"For Mom" (Early Version)	2:39
2.	"Who Me?" (Early Version)	3:02
3.	"Little Gracie"	2:11
4.	"Ed's Rhapsody / Midnight Dance / Jars"	2:55
5.	"Ganryu Island / Sasaki's Gone"	2:14
6.	"Ghosts Upstairs"	2:39
7.	"Spirals"	3:48
8.	"Cubes, Chunks & Crumbles"	3:27
9.	"Thugs"	7:38
10.	"Dinging / Ah-Ji-Jee"	2:38
11.	"Johnny"	2:17
12.	"Stay Out of the Shed"	3:00
13.	"Serape"	1:46
14.	"Longing"	10:33
15.	"Box Elders"	1:14
Total length:		52:01

== Credits ==
- Buckethead – acoustic guitar
- Tyler Stipe – engineer
