= Monsters and Robots =

Studio album by Buckethead
- Released: September 21, 1999
- Recorded: 1998–1999
- Genre: Experimental rock, funk rock, electronic rock, alternative metal
- Length: 50:54 (standard release); 55:12 (Japanese release)
- Label: CyberOctave, Higher Octave Music, Virgin, EMI
- Producer: Pete Scaturro, Les Claypool, Extrakd, Bill Laswell

Buckethead chronology
Colma (1998)	Monsters and Robots (1999)	KFC Skin Piles (2001)

Professional ratings
Review scores
Source	Rating
AllMusic	4/5 stars

Monsters and Robots is Buckethead's fifth studio album, released September 21, 1999, by Higher Octave records. A large part of the album was co-written with Les Claypool, who also plays bass on several tracks and lends his vocals to the track "The Ballad of Buckethead".

Buckethead promoted the album by opening for Primus in October and November 1999. Monsters and Robots is listed in the German National Library's catalog and is Buckethead's best selling solo album to date.

== Track listing ==
No.	Title	Writer(s)	Length
1.	"Jump Man"	Buckethead, Pete Scaturro	4:21
2.	"Stick Pit"	Buckethead, Les Claypool, Bryan Mantia	3:40
3.	"The Ballad of Buckethead"	Buckethead, Claypool, Mantia	3:59
4.	"Sow Thistle"	Buckethead, Steve Freeman, Bootsy Collins	4:30
5.	"Revenge of the Double-Man"	Buckethead, Claypool, Mantia, DJ Disk	3:34
6.	"Night of the Slunk"	Buckethead	5:43
7.	"Who Me?"	Buckethead	2:08
8.	"Jowls"	Buckethead, Scaturro, Mantia	4:26
9.	"The Shape Vs. Buckethead"	Buckethead, Freeman, Collins	5:40
10.	"Stun Operator"	Buckethead, Claypool, Mantia	4:17
11.	"Scapula"	Buckethead, Scaturro, Mantia	4:04
12.	"Nun Chuka Kata"	Buckethead, Claypool, Mantia, DJ Disk	4:30
13.	"Remote Viewer #13" (Japanese edition bonus track)	Buckethead, Claypool, Mantia, DJ Disk	4:18
Total length:			55:12

=== Notes ===
- The songs "Jowls" and "Scapula" are both re-recorded versions of songs of the same names on Giant Robot (NTT).
- The song "Night of the Slunk" has a similar riff as "Jump Man", but longer with less distortion.
- An alternate version of the song "Revenge of the Double-Man", named "Torture Tunnel" appears on the album The 13th Scroll released in 1999 by Buckethead's side project Cobra Strike.
- "Revenge of the Double-Man" references the arcade game Sinistar.
- "Scapula" uses several samples taken from the movie The Texas Chain Saw Massacre.

== Personnel ==
- Buckethead — guitar (all tracks), bass guitar (tracks 1, 8 and 11)
- Les Claypool — vocals (track 3), bass (tracks 2, 3, 5, 10, 12 and 13)
- Brain — drums, percussion (tracks 2, 3, 5, 8, 10, 11, 12 and 13)
- Phonopsychograph Disk — turntables (tracks 3, 5, 8, 10, 12 and 13)
- Bootsy Collins — vocals (tracks 1, 4, 7 and 9)
- Ouiwey Collins — vocals (track 9)
- DJ Eddie Def — turntables (tracks 4 and 9)
- Max Robertson — vocals (track 11)
- The Chicken Scratch Choir — background vocals (track 3)

=== Production ===
- Tracks 1, 8, 11 recorded at Horn of Zeus.
  - Produced & mixed by Pete Scaturro & Rob Beaton.
  - "Jowls" originally recorded by Howard Johnson @ Different Fur Recording
  - Recording assistance on 8 by Mark Weber, on 11 by Mark Weber & Eric Ware.
- Tracks 2, 3, 5, 7, 10, 12, 13 recorded at Rancho Relaxo studios.
  - Produced by Les Claypool.
  - Engineered by Oz Fritz.
- Tracks 4 & 9 recorded at the Embalming Plant.
  - Produced by Extrakd.
- Track 6 recorded at Orange Music.
  - Produced by Bill Laswell.
  - Engineered by Robert Musso.
- Additional production on tracks 1, 4 & 9 by Bootsy Collins at Bootzilla Re-hab P-form School.
- Mastered by Don E. Tyler at Precision Mastering.
- A&R direction: Warren Schummer.
- Design, illustration & photography: Dave McKean @ Hourglass.
- Cover illustration for Buckethead No. 2: Bryan Frankenseuss Theiss.
- Photographs on pgs. 3, 6, 7 & back inlay: Warren Schummer.
- 3-d programming: Max MacMuffin.
- Production manager: Gina Grimes.
- Product marketing manager: Kenny Nemes.

== The Ballad of Buckethead ==
"The Ballad of Buckethead"

Song by Buckethead

from the album Monsters and Robots
- Released: April 20, 1999
- Recorded: Rancho Relaxo studios
- Genre: Experimental rock, funk metal
- Length: 3:59
- Label: Higher Octave
- Songwriters: Buckethead, Les Claypool, Bryan Mantia
- Producer: Les Claypool

"The Ballad of Buckethead" was chosen to promote Monsters and Robots. It is one of the few Buckethead songs to prominently feature vocals, which are performed by Primus' Les Claypool. Drums were performed by long-time Buckethead friend (and then Primus drummer) Brain.

The song is split into three verses, with the chorus following the first and third verse. The song, as its title suggests, tells the (fictional) story of Buckethead's life, particularly his upbringing. According to Buckethead's official biography, he was raised in a chicken coop by chickens, and the lyrics to the narrative continue this theme:

Buckethead found his freedom at the age of 17

When he burned the chicken house down with a quart of gasoline
He did puppet shows on corners and bought a real guitar

And with the help of Colonel Sanders he's bound to be a star

A video clip using 3D models and reassembling themes from the lyrics was made by English artist Dave McKean, and gained airplay on several music related television stations.

The song was included to Primus' live set in October and November 1999, when Buckethead made stage cameos.

"The Ballad of Buckethead" features samples from the 1996 movie Sling Blade.

The music video was nominated for the "Best New Artist - Modern Rock" on Billboard's Music Video Awards.

=== Credits ===
- Buckethead — guitar
- Les Claypool — vocals, bass
- Brain — drums
- Phonopsychograph Disk — turntables
- The Chicken Scratch Choir — background vocals
