= Giant Robot (Buckethead album) =

Studio album by Buckethead
- Released: November 3, 1994 (Sony Japan); September 18, 2000 (CyberOctave)
- Genre: Heavy metal, experimental rock, experimental metal, hard rock, funk metal, progressive rock, spoken word
- Length: 73:31
- Label: Sony Japan / CyberOctave
- Producer: Bill Laswell

Buckethead chronology
Bucketheadland (1992)	Giant Robot (1994)	The Day of the Robot (1996)

Professional ratings
Review scores
Source	Rating
Allmusic	2.5/5 stars

Giant Robot is the second studio album by avant-garde guitarist Buckethead (not to be confused with the 1996 Giant Robot, also featuring Buckethead) and loosely following the same "amusement park" concept as his previous album (Bucketheadland). It has some re-recorded songs from Buckethead's band Deli Creeps, as well his earlier demo tape Bucketheadland Blueprints. Giant Robot has a more professional sound than its predecessor in terms of recording and production value; the re-recorded tracks have lost their initial "basement" or "video game" sounding beats and guitar licks. As with Bucketheadland, the album was originally only released in Japan.

Unlike later Buckethead solo albums, the Bill Laswell-produced Giant Robot contains many vocal contributions from guests such as Iggy Pop, Bill Moseley, Throatrake and Julian Schnabel's kids Stella and Vito. The album also features many high-profile instrumentalists such as Sly Dunbar, Bootsy Collins and Karl Berger.

The reason "Binge and Grab" is noted as being an "instrumental version" is because it was originally a Deli Creeps song with lyrics by Maximum Bob. There is no known studio recording of the Deli Creeps version but there are many bootleg copies from live shows which can be found among collectors.

The track "Pure Imagination" features an introduction message that recalls Mudbone, a character that regularly appeared in the stand-up routines of comedian Richard Pryor.

The cover art features a shadow of a giant robot and sets the tone for the music on the album. The original release contained a comic inside the booklet.

Overall, the music has been described as "an equally unique sound from P-Funkadelic grooves, shoddy sci-fi dialogue samples and the wickedest six-string shredding this side of Steve Vai."

The album was re-issued in 2000 through CyberOctave, making it more widely available.

== Track listing ==
No.	Title	Writer(s)	Length
1.	"Doomride"		0:57
2.	"Welcome to Bucketheadland"	Buckethead	3:42
3.	"I Come in Peace"		6:03
4.	"Buckethead's Toy Store"		8:02
5.	"Want Some Slaw?"		4:30
6.	"Warweb"		3:06
7.	"Aquabot"		5:57
8.	"Binge and Grab" (Instrumental Version)		5:17
9.	"Pure Imagination"	Leslie Bricusse & Anthony Newley	1:49
10.	"Buckethead's Chamber of Horrors"		4:49
11.	"Onions Unleashed"		2:20
12.	"Chicken"		1:07
13.	"I Love My Parents"		4:13
14.	"Buckethead's T.V. Show"		3:18
15.	"Robot Transmission"		2:59
16.	"Pirate's Life for Me"	George Bruns	1:01
17.	"Post Office Buddy"		6:40
18.	"Star Wars"	John Williams	1:54
19.	"Last Train to Bucketheadland"		5:47
Total length:			73:31

=== Welcome to Bucketheadland ===
"Welcome to Bucketheadland" is the second song of the album and was produced by Bill Laswell.

An earlier version of the song, the Bootsy Collins produced "Park Theme", can be found on Buckethead's 1992 debut album Bucketheadland, featuring a different voice-over reciting of the song's title, as well as some other spoken words and a more "electronic feel", due to the use of a drum machine in contrast to the drumming of P-funk's Jerome Brailey on the 1994 version.

Another version, "Park Theme Extension", is included on the second disc of Bucketheadland (the "dance remixes"), being longer and more electronica orientated.

In 2007 Buckethead re-issued his 1991 demo tape Bucketheadland Blueprints with what might be the original version of the theme, "Intro to Bucketheadland".

The song is used as the official theme to Buckethead's fictional "abusement" park Bucketheadland whose concept spans several of the artist's releases up to present. It is a fan-favourite and therefore often played as the last encore at concerts.

JazzTimes wrote: "[I]t can leave you wondering if [Buckethead's] tongue is in his cheek or in his frontal lobes."

==== Influences ====
"Welcome to Bucketheadland" is highly influenced by early 1980s hard rock, incorporating a main riff reminiscent of Van Halen's "Ain't Talkin' 'bout Love" as well as using a bridge which reminds of the first guitar bars and 16th triplet note pull off runs of "Crazy Train" by Ozzy Osbourne. The song also contains a riff very similar to "Rattlesnake Shake" by Skid Row. Osbourne's then guitar player Randy Rhoads reportedly influenced Buckethead's playing.

=== Binge and Grab ===
Binge and Grab is a song written and originally performed by the Deli Creeps. Deli Creeps guitarist Buckethead's version Giant Robot is more commonly known. The Deli Creeps never recorded the song in the studio, but regularly played the song live. Live performances of the song were included on the Young Buckethead DVDs.

==== Buckethead version ====
Buckethead recorded an instrumental version for his second album, which also featured reinterpretations of the Deli Creeps' songs "Smilin' Charlie" (known as "Post Office Buddy" on the album) and "Random Killing" (known as "I Come In Peace" on the album). The song met mixed reviews, ranging from "unironic 80s arena rocker" to getting high marks.

The song is often mentioned as a fan favorite, becoming somewhat of a signature song, along with "Jordan" and "Nottingham Lace".

== Personnel ==
Musical personnel

- Buckethead – guitars (all tracks), bass (tracks 3, 5, 17 and 19)
- Bill Laswell – sound effects (tracks 1, 5, 8, 15, 17 and 19), production
- Throatrake – vocals (tracks 4, 7, 10 and 19)
- Bill Moseley – vocals (tracks 3 and 11)
- Iggy Pop – vocals (tracks 4 and 17)
- Stella Schnabel – vocals (tracks 6 and 14)
- Moma Collins – vocals (track 5)
- Julian Schnabel – vocals (track 14)
- Vito Schnabel – vocals (track 14)
- Kristen Gray – vocals (track 17)
- Bootsy Collins – bass (tracks 2, 4, 7 and 8), vocals (tracks 5)
- Jerome Brailey – drums (tracks 2, 4, 7, 8, 14 and 15)
- Ted Parsons – drums (tracks 5, 10, 11 and 17)
- Pinchface – drums (tracks 3 and 18)
- Karl Berger – string arrangements (tracks 6, 13 and 14)
- Sly Dunbar – drum programming (track 19)

Production personnel

- Oz Fritz – engineering, mixing
- Imad Mansour – engineering assistance
- Howie Weinberg – mastering

Additional personnel

- Stephen Walker – artwork (booklet)
- Jam Suzuki – artwork (comic)
- Mike Belongie – photography
