= Giant Robo (TV series) =

Manga and tokusatsu series created by Mitsuteru Yokoyama

- Giant Robo title card
- Also known as: Johnny Sokko and His Flying Robot
- Genre: Tokusatsu, fantasy, Kyodai Hero
- Created by: Mitsuteru Yokoyama
- Based on: Giant Robo by Mitsuteru Yokoyama
- Written by: Masaru Igami
- Directed by: Minoru Yamada
- Country of origin: Japan
- Original language: Japanese
- No. of episodes: 26 (list of episodes)

Production
- Executive producer: Mitsuteru Yokoyama
- Production locations: Tokyo, Japan
- Running time: 24 minutes
- Production companies: NET; Toei Company

Original release
- Network: NET
- Release: October 11, 1967 – April 1, 1968

Giant Robo (ジャイアントロボ, Jaianto Robo), also known as Johnny Sokko and His Flying Robot in the United States, is a manga and tokusatsu series created by Mitsuteru Yokoyama. It is similar to Yokoyama's Tetsujin 28-go (known as Gigantor in the U.S.), but Giant Robo has more elements of fantasy. The original 26-episode tokusatsu TV series, produced by Toei Company, aired on NET (later renamed TV Asahi) from October 11, 1967, to April 1, 1968.

== Plot ==
Earth is invaded by an interstellar terrorist group, Big Fire (the Gargoyle Gang in the American version), led by Emperor Guillotine. Guillotine spends most of his time in a multicolored space ship hidden at the bottom of Earth's ocean, from which he issues his orders. The group has been capturing scientists to create an army of monsters to help them conquer Earth. A boy named Daisaku Kusama (Johnny Sokko in the American version) and a young Unicorn peacekeeping agent named Jūrō Minami (Jerry Mano in the American version) are shipwrecked on an island after their ship is attacked by the sea monster Dakolar and subsequently captured by Big Fire. They flee onto an elevator leading to a complex where a Pharaoh-like giant robot is being built by captive scientist Lucius Guardian, who gives Daisaku and Jūrō its control device. Guardian helps them escape before he is shot to death; before he dies, he triggers an atomic bomb which destroys the base. The radiation activates the robot, which now obeys only Daisaku. The boy is invited by Jūrō and his chief, Azuma, to join Unicorn and fight Big Fire with Giant Robo.

== Cast ==
- Mitsunobu Kaneko as Daisaku Kusama/Johnny Sokko
- Toshiyuki Tsuchiyama as Giant Robo/Giant Robot
- Koichi Chiba as Narrator
- Akio Ito as Juro Minami/Jerry Mano
- Shozaburo Date as Chief Azuma
- Tomomi Kuwabara as Mari Hanamura
- Hirohiko Sato as Emperor Guillotine
- Yumiko Katayama as Mitsuko Nishino

=== English voice actors ===
- Bobbie Byers - Daisaku Kusama/Johnny Sokko
- Ted Rusoff - Juro Minami/Jerry Mano
- Paul Brown
- Mark Harris

== Alternate versions ==
The English-dubbed American version of the series was written by Reuben Guberman, produced by Salvatore Billitteri, and directed by Manuel San Fernando. It was released by American International Television, first broadcast in the United States in 1969 by AIP-TV, and was in syndication through the early 1980s. It also aired during the early 1970s through the 1990s in Australia, the United Kingdom, Brazil, India, and various Southeast Asian and Latin American countries.

In 1970, stock footage from episodes 1, 2, 10, 17 and 26 were edited together and released by AIP-TV as a 100-minute made-for-TV film called Voyage Into Space.

=== Home media releases ===
A hastily edited seven-minute highlight reel of Voyage Into Space was created for the Super 8 home movie market during the early 1970s by Ken Films.

Toei Video released 22 episodes of the series on Betamax and VHS for the Japanese market in 1981 and 1982 and later released the entire series on LaserDisc in Japan during the 1990s. It is also available on DVD in Japan.

In 1996, the Johnny Sokko version of the series was re-released through distribution by Orion Home Video and Streamline Pictures containing eight episodes in production order on four volumes (two episodes on each videocassette). Plans for further volumes were cancelled due to the parent company Orion Pictures being purchased by Metro-Goldwyn-Mayer in 1997.

On March 26, 2013, Shout! Factory released the 26-episode, four-disc box set Johnny Sokko and His Flying Robot: The Complete Series on DVD in Region 1.

In February 2021, a remastered version of Voyage Into Space was released on Blu-ray by RoninFlix and Scorpion Releasing.

== Reception ==
=== Critical reception ===
The Encyclopedia of Science Fiction described the 1967 live-action television series Giant Robo as a tokusatsu production featuring battles between a giant robot and a succession of monsters, many portrayed by actors in costumes. It noted the variety of antagonists, ranging from conventional kaiju to mechanical and supernatural creatures. The encyclopedia considered the series a possible early example of the mecha genre, although it observed that this classification depends on whether remotely controlled robots, rather than piloted machines, are included. It also highlighted the series' ending, in which the robot sacrifices itself to destroy the principal villain, observing that this conclusion apparently traumatized many young viewers.

=== Violence concerns ===
Although the series was violent by 1960s American standards for children's programming, in Japan it was no more violent than other tokusatsu TV series airing at the time. Gunfights are a staple of each episode and the show's two child leads (Johnny Sokko and Mari Hanson) were frequently seen shooting with the other Unicorn agents. In one episode, Johnny and Mari are captured and tied to trees by Gargoyle and are within seconds of being executed by a firing squad when they are rescued by Unicorn agents. Nearly every Japanese anime exported to the United States during that period was edited for violence, but in Johnny Sokko and His Flying Robot, only a minimum of violence was removed. (At least one US TV station, WXON in Detroit, ran disclaimers before each show saying, "Remember, kids, Johnny Sokko is make-believe and the actors are just pretending.") In addition to dubbing American voice actors for the American version, many of the show's sound effects were remixed or re-recorded.

== List of episodes ==
The following episode titles were transcribed from the on-screen title cards of the American version. They are in their original Japanese and American broadcast order, verified by previews for the next episode at the end of each one:

No.	Title	Directed by	Written by	Original release date
1	"Dracolon, The Great Sea Monster"	Minoru Yamada	Masaru Igami	11 October 1967
Shipwrecked, Daisaku Kusama (called Johnny Sokko in the American version) and Juro Minami (called Jerry Mano in the American version), an agent for the organization Unicorn, drift to an island which proves to be a base of the BF Syndicate (called the Gargoyle Gang in the American version), an extra-terrestrial terrorist group from the planet Gargoyle, who are bent on conquering Earth in the name of their leader, an alien known as Emperor Guillotine. They learn of a huge robot created by Dr Lucius Guardian for the BF Syndicate while they are escaping. Meanwhile, Emperor Guillotine commands the BF Commander Spider to send Dracolon (the same a monster that was responsible for the shipwrecks) on a mission to attack Tokyo, the city of Unicorn's main headquarters. Now under the control of Daisaku, will Giant Robo destroy Dakolar before Tokyo crumbles under the weight of the monster's enormous might?
2	"Nucleon, The Magic Globe"	Minoru Yamada	Masaru Igami	18 October 1967
Emperor Guillotine, the leader of the BF Syndicate, plans to take back Giant Robo and in order to do so, he sends Spider and his men to capture Daisaku, the only one that can give orders to the robot. Guillotine also sends a huge metal globe called Globar to Earth.
3	"The Gargoyle Vine-A Space Plant"	Koichi Takemoto	Hiro Matsuda; Shu Abe	25 October 1967
Under Emperor Guillotine's orders after being brought from the far planet, Dr. Over (called Dr. Botanus in the American version), another leading member of the BF Syndicate, comes to Earth with the seed of a devilish alien plant called the Satan Rose (called the Gargoyle Vine in the American version).
4	"Monster Ligon-Tyrox, A Strange Monster"	Koichi Takemoto	Hiro Matsuda; Shu Abe	1 November 1967
Emperor Guillotine sends his BF Syndicate minions (including Commander Spider and Doctor Over) and Lygon, a new weapon in the shape of a pyramid, to Earth. By operating Lygon, Dr. Over destroys oil fields in Arabia, one after another.
5	"The Gigantic Claw"	Itaru Orita	Masaru Igami	8 November 1967
Dr. Tadokora develops QQV, a super-strong transparent metal. He tests it and QQV endures all the attacks of Giant Robo. The BF Syndicate watch the experiments using TV cameras and try to steal the specifications of QQV.
6	"Dragon, The Ninja Monster"	Itaru Orita	Masaru Igami	15 November 1967
A monster called Dorogon swallows a jet plane of the Commonwealth of Sordia when it is flying and an atomic submarine of the Furenkov Republic when it is under the sea. This is Emperor Guillotine's plan to cause a world war.
7	"Our Enemy-Scalion"	Koichi Takemoto	Masaru Igami	22 November 1967
The decoding office of the Japanese branch of Unicorn is in the basement of a lighthouse on the coast of the Pacific Ocean.
8	"The Challenge of the Two-Headed Monster"	Koichi Takemoto	Masaru Igami	29 November 1967
Daisaku and Minami happen to help a one-eyed man whom BF members are chasing. According to the man's story, they are trying to kill him as a traitor because he became frightened by the inhumanity of the BF Syndicate and left it.
9	"Tentaclon-An Electric Monster"	Minoru Yamada	Shu Abe	6 December 1967
Emperor Guillotine gives Dr. Over a spaceship equipped with all kinds of scientific weapons. After landing on Earth, Over sends an electric monster called Sparky to the grounds of a soccer game and kidnaps all 60,000 spectators as hostages.
10	"The Transformed Humans"	Michio Konishi	Hiro Matsuda; Shu Abe	13 December 1967
Dr. Over and Black Dia (called Harlequin in the American version) make the resurrected Lygon swallow a train near Lake Biwa to kidnap Suzuki, one of the passengers and the head of the Kyoto branch of Unicorn.
11	"The Terrifying Sand Creature"	Katsuhiko Taguchi	Masaru Igami	20 December 1967
The underground office of the South Pole Unicorn branch is buried in red sand which suddenly starts to gush out in the ice fields. As communications are cut off, Azuma sends Daisaku and Minami there to see what happened.
12	"Amberon The Synthetic Monster"	Minoru Yamada	Shu Abe	27 December 1967
Unicorn members locate the secret headquarters of the Japanese branch of the BF Syndicate. They attack the house and arrest Dr. Over by taking off his blue star-shaped medal on his chest, the source of his power.
13	"Opticorn Must Be Destroyed"	Koichi Takemoto	Masaru Igami	3 January 1968
There is a small quiet Allah Republic at the foot of the Alps; the only product of this beautiful country is gold. Her peace is broken when a vein of new ore is found in a gold mine.
14	"The Monstrous Flying Jawbone"	Koichi Takemoto	Masaru Igami	10 January 1968
The office of Unicorn's Chinese branch is attacked by tank corps led by Red Cobra (called both Fangar and Dangor the Executioner in the American version). Chang, its head, asks the help of the Japanese branch. Azuma, Daisaku and Minami fly there on Giant Robo's back.
15	"Igganog-The Ice-Berg Monster"	Minoru Yamada	Hiro Matsuda; Shu Abe	17 January 1968
Daisaku and Minami suspect that a strange villa standing in the heart of the Japanese Alps is a secret base of the BF Syndicate. They approach the house to get some proof, when men in the house notice them and look for them.
16	"Torozon-An Enemy Robot"	Itaru Orita	Masaru Igami	24 January 1968
Beginning with the Swiss branch, the Unicorn branch headquarters are mysteriously destroyed one after another — Rome, Cairo, Bombay, Singapore, Hong Kong, then Tapai. It is easy to guess that Tokyo will be next.
17	"Destroy the Dam"	Michio Konishi	Hiro Matsuda; Shu Abe	29 January 1968
The Satan Rose has returned and this time it has sucked up all of the water in a lake, with Dr. Over and Red Cobra overseeing the monster's rampage. Will it grow to an incredible size and defeat the combined military might of Earth? Will Giant Robo defeat the Satan Rose again for the sake of Japan and the rest of Earth? And if so, what will happen to Dr. Over himself when he fails an angry Emperor Guillotine one final time?
18	"X-7, A Mysterious Enemy Agent"	Minoru Yamada	Masaru Igami	5 February 1968
The mysterious enemy agent X-7 is assassinating Unicorn operatives around the world with the help of a rebuilt Gangar, a giant flying mechanical hand. As a precaution, Minami is assigned to protect Daisaku, since only U7 can control Giant Robo. That same day, a new kid named Shinichi Kuroba joins Daisaku's class in school. Coincidence?
19	"Metron-The Mysterious Space-Man"	Koichi Takemoto	Masaru Igami	12 February 1968
The mysterious space-man Metro Three lands in his flying saucer and befriends Unicorn. Yet it should come as no surprise that he is actually working for the BF Syndicate. GR-2 makes an encore appearance, but Giant Robo literally tears him apart.
20	"Beware-The Radion Globe"	Katsuhiko Taguchi	Masaru Igami	19 February 1968
A rebuilt Globar captures Giant Robo and Red Cobra is going to replace its electronic brain. Daisaku and Minami find Giant Robo. Daisaku's tears of frustration reactivate Giant Robo's brain so that it can fight Globar.
21	"The Terrifying Space Mummy"	Katsuhiko Taguchi	Masaru Igami	26 February 1968
Millerman (called the Space Mummy in the American version) has poisoned the water supply so anyone who drinks it is turned into a mummy. Millerman and the BF Syndicate are hiding out in a convent disguised as nuns. Agent U5 is captured and Minami dresses as a nun to rescue her. Mari storms the convent with guns blazing to rescue them. Giant Robo must fight a revived Dorogon, which Millerman can cause to grow and shrink in size with the aid of a special device.
22	"Clash of the Giant Robots"	Itaru Orita	Hiro Matsuda; Shu Abe	4 March 1968
The country of Melcon wants their own giant robot and the anniversary of Giant Robo's creation is spoiled by the news. The Melconians build Calamity, but Mr. Gold (called Goldenaut in the American version) steals it. Gargoyle scientists cannot activate Calamity, but the robot's defense reaction disables Giant Robo by using its own attacks against it. Even though it is temporarily blinded, Giant Robo defeats Sparky and throws it at Calamity, destroying them both.
23	"Dr. Eingali-Master of Evil"	Katsuhiko Taguchi	Mon Shichijo	11 March 1968
Daisaku Kusama is the only one who can control Giant Robo with a controller disguised as an ordinary wrist watch. One day, he receives a parcel from his father as a birthday gift; it is a kit for constructing a child-sized robot. However, the "gift" is not all that it seems to be. It turns out to be an android duplicate of Daisaku, created by Emperor Guillotine's new accomplice, Dr. Germa (called Dr. Eingali in the American version), to steal his controller and turn Giant Robo against Earth.
24	"Hydrazona-A Terrifying Bacteria"	Koichi Takemoto	Hiro Matsuda; Shu Abe	18 March 1968
After the destruction of both Tokyo's highway systems and the world's first VTOL oil transporter, Unicorn finds out the culprit behind all this is Professor's Hydrazona bacteria, a germ so acidic and destructive that even the life of Giant Robo is in mortal danger. Can Daisaku and Minami save Giant Robo in time from the double threat of Hydrazona and the newly revived Icelar?
25	"Drakulon-Creature of Doom"	Minoru Yamada	Masaru Igami	25 March 1968
Drakulon, a vampire from the planet Gargoyle, has transformed a group of people into vampires in an effort to conquer Earth for Emperor Guillotine. Will Daisaku Kusama and Jiro Minami hold off Drakulon's bloodthirsty slaves until Giant Robo arrives to help them, or will they too be turned into vampires themselves?
26	"The Last of Emperor Guillotine"	Minoru Yamada	Masaru Igami	1 April 1968
Johnny is shot by a very careless assassin and Emperor Guillotine pulls out all the stops, throwing his three remaining monsters (Opticon, Igganog, Scalion) at Giant Robot, causing it to be drained of energy. Guillotine then grows to gigantic size and declares himself the ruler of Earth. Giant Robot cannot defeat him, because Guillotine is made of atomic energy and traditional attacks would blow up Earth. Will Giant Robot make the ultimate sacrifice to save the planet and Johnny?

== Related series ==
GR: Giant Robo (GR ジャイアントロボ, GR: Jaianto Robo) is an animated TV series written by Chiaki Konaka (Serial Experiments Lain, The Big O) and directed by Masahiko Murata (Jinki:EXTEND, Mazinkaiser). At the dawn of the 21st century, Earth is overrun by giant robots. Daisaku Kusama encounters the titular Robo in a ruin in Okinawa. Beckoned by forces he cannot understand, Daisaku is made to bond, body and spirit, with the ancient weapon and defend his homeland from the incoming evil.

== In popular culture ==
- Frank H. Wu, a Johnny Sokko fan as a child, describes several episodes of the show in his book Yellow: Race in America Beyond Black and White.
- Guitarist Buckethead named his early band and second studio album after the series, including several references to characters and events from the series in his music.
- Punk band The Vandals recorded "Big Bro vs. Johnny Sako" on their 1984 album When in Rome Do as The Vandals.
- The indie band Johnny Socko took their name from the TV show.
- Giant Robot, the magazine focusing on Asian and Asian-American popular culture, founded in Southern California in 1994, was named after the TV series.
- Giant Robo makes an unauthorized appearance in the 1987 Arcade Game Ginga Ninkyouden as a boss character named G Robo, who suffers from nosebleeding when he is defeated.
- Giant Robo makes a background cameo in the South Park episode (S11 Ep.12) "Imaginationland Episode III" and in the 1991 OVA Otaku no Video.
- The show's now-famous ending has been paid tribute to in several other mecha series, including Daitetsujin 17 and The Iron Giant.
- The tenth Captain Underpants book, Captain Underpants and the Revolting Revenge of the Radioactive Robo-Boxers, has Giant Robo make a cameo on page 66, as creator Dav Pilkey is a noted fan of the series.
