= Buckethead =

American guitarist (born 1969)

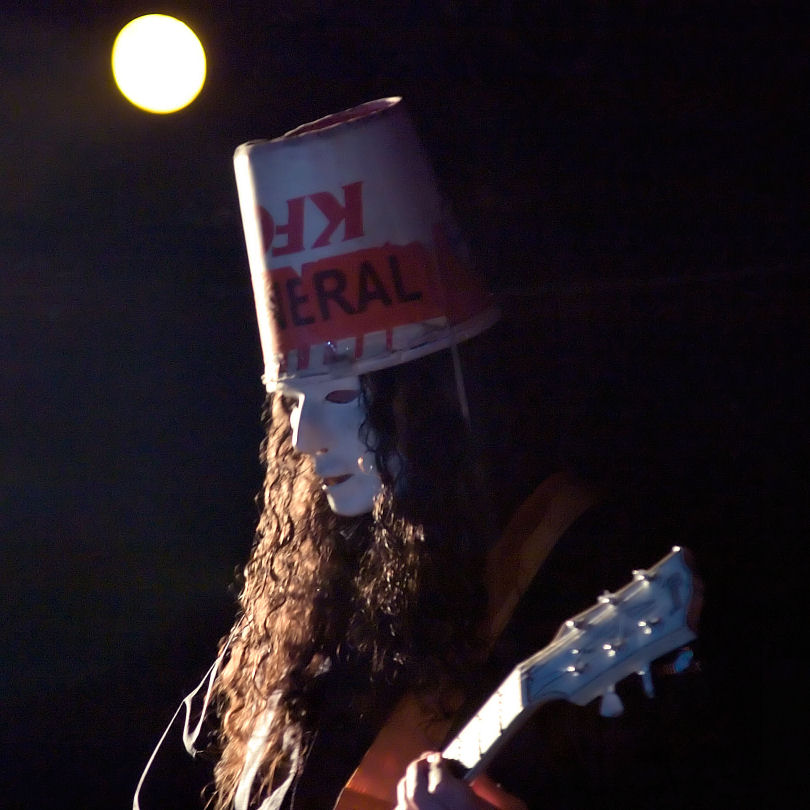
- Buckethead performing in 2006

Background information
- Also known as: Death Cube K; Big B
- Born: Brian Patrick Carroll; May 13, 1969 (age 57); Pomona, California, U.S.
- Genres: Experimental rock; progressive metal; funk; bluegrass; avant-garde metal; alternative rock; alternative metal; ambient; heavy metal
- Occupations: Musician; songwriter
- Instrument: Guitar
- Years active: 1987–present
- Labels: Shrimper/PSST; TDRS; Hatboxghost; Bucketheadland; Avant; Day Eight; Sony; CyberOctave; Sub Meta; Metastation; City Hall; Stray; Gonervill; Catalyst; Ion; Disembodied; Tzadik; Avabella; Serjical Strike
- Formerly of: Deli Creeps; Praxis; Cornbugs; El Stew; Guns N' Roses; Thanatopsis; Primus; Colonel Claypool's Bucket of Bernie Brains; The Frankenstein Brothers; Science Faxtion
- Website: bucketheadpikes.com

Brian Patrick Carroll (born May 13, 1969), known professionally as Buckethead, is an American guitarist.

Buckethead's extensive solo discography currently includes 31 studio albums. In 2011, Buckethead began releasing albums in the "Pike" series, mini-albums usually around 30 minutes in length, each with a sequential number similar to a comic book. As of July 2026, Buckethead has released 810 Pike albums, including almost 300 live recordings.

Buckethead has also released seven studio albums under the alias Death Cube K (an anagram of Buckethead). He has released collaborative albums with Brain, Travis Dickerson, Melissa Reese, Viggo Mortensen, Shin Terai, DJ Disk, Bootsy Collins, That 1 Guy and albums with the bands Praxis, Cornbugs, Science Faxtion, Guns N' Roses, Colonel Claypool's Bucket of Bernie Brains, and Deli Creeps, in addition to many other collaborations with bands and artists. Between 2000 and 2004, Buckethead was a lead guitarist of Guns N' Roses, recording on the long-delayed Chinese Democracy (2008) album. He also performed with the band on the first legs of the album's accompanying tour.

Buckethead performs wearing a KFC bucket on his head, sometimes emblazoned with an orange bumper sticker reading FUNERAL in block letters. This is accompanied by an expressionless plain white mask inspired by the 1988 slasher film Halloween 4: The Return of Michael Myers. He also incorporates nunchaku and robot dancing into his stage performances. Buckethead stays in character in performances and interviews, and does not appear without some sort of mask.

Buckethead was credited by Guitar World as "ushering in [a] new era of virtuosity" while ranking the release of his 1992 debut album Bucketheadland the 45th greatest moment in electric guitar history. The magazine has also listed him among the "25 all-time weirdest guitarists" and the "50 fastest guitarists of all time".

== Early and personal life ==
Brian Patrick Carroll was born on May 13, 1969, to Tom and Nancy Carroll; he is the youngest of five siblings along with Lynn, Lisa, Lori, and John. His father was the athletic director at Damien High School in La Verne, California from 1973 until his retirement in 2013.

Carroll grew up in a Southern California suburb near Disneyland. In his youth he was an introvert and spent most of his time in his room with books, games, martial-arts movie memorabilia, and toys. He also spent a lot of time at Disneyland.

Carroll began playing guitar at the age of 12. He learned to play from an elderly man down his road. He is quoted saying that he became serious a year later after moving from Huntington Beach, California, to Claremont. His playing improved with lessons from various teachers at a local music store. His early teachers included Max McGuire, Johnny Fortune, Mark Hammond, Pebber Brown, Joey Tafolla, and Paul Gilbert. In 2003, Buckethead played a tribute to all his early teachers as the Deli Creeps played a show at Styles Music's 25th anniversary. He then began making demo recordings of both his playing as well as his writing styles, which would later be released in 2007–2008.

The Buckethead persona came to be when Carroll saw the 1988 slasher film Halloween 4 and was inspired by the film. He went out right after seeing it and bought a Michael Myers-like white mask. The bucket idea came later that night while eating chicken:

I was eating it, and I put the mask on and then the bucket on my head. I went to the mirror. I just said, 'Buckethead. That's Buckethead right there.' It was just one of those things. After that, I wanted to be that thing all the time.

— Buckethead, 1996, Guitar Player Magazine

In October 2017, Carroll gave a rare out-of-character interview discussing all ranges of his life, the Buckethead character, his parents' deaths, his health problems, and how he copes with overcoming fear. During the podcast, he revealed he has been diagnosed with the potentially life-threatening condition of heart arrhythmia. He stated he had a cardiac ablation performed and uses medicine to control the problem.

== Career ==
=== 1988–1994: Early solo career and Praxis ===
In 1988, after leaving the band Class-X, Carroll entered a home recording of his song "Brazos" into a Guitar Player magazine contest. It was a runner-up, with editors writing:

An astonishingly skilled guitarist and bassist, he demonstrates post-Paul Gilbert speed and accuracy filtered through very kinky harmonic sensibilities. His psychotronic, demonic edge is very, very far removed from the clichés of classical metal and rock. A real talent to watch, also known as "Buckethead."

In the same year, the magazine's editor, Jas Obrecht, came to know of Buckethead when Carroll and his parents left a demo recording at the magazine's reception desk for Obrecht. Impressed with this demo, he rushed into the restaurant where Buckethead and his parents were having lunch and encouraged him to make the most of his talent. They soon became friends. In 1989, a song called "Soowee" by Buckethead got honorable mention in another song contest. In 1991, Buckethead moved into Obrecht's basement. The song "Brazos" was eventually released on the 1991 demo tape of his band Deli Creeps, titled "Tribal Rites", and again as bonus material in Buckethead's Secret Recipe DVD in 2006. Luke Sacco was his teacher.

In 1991, Buckethead contributed to Derek Bailey's Company project alongside, among others, John Zorn and Alexander Bălănescu, resulting in a triple album called Company 91.

After his first two demo tapes, called Giant Robot and Bucketheadland Blueprints, Buckethead released Bucketheadland on John Zorn's Japanese Avant record label in 1992. Though available only as a pricey import, the record received positive reviews and earned some attention. At about this time, Buckethead fell into the orbit of prolific bassist/producer Bill Laswell, himself an occasional Zorn collaborator; Buckethead was introduced to Laswell by Limbomaniacs drummer Brain, who gave Laswell a video of Buckethead playing in his room. Buckethead soon became Laswell's second staple guitar player, besides Nicky Skopelitis.

In 1992, Buckethead, with Bill Laswell, Bernie Worrell, Bootsy Collins, and Brain, formed the supergroup Praxis. Their first album, Transmutation (Mutatis Mutandis), released the same year, was well received. The project was Bill Laswell's concept, and has since involved other guests such as Serj Tankian of System of a Down, among many others. Buckethead participated in every release except the initial 1984 release and Mold (1998).

In 1993, Buckethead auditioned to play for the Red Hot Chili Peppers. The band eventually ended up with Arik Marshall, and later Dave Navarro. After some legal complications with Sony Music Entertainment, Buckethead decided to release his 1994 album Dreamatorium under the name of Death Cube K (an anagram).

Death Cube K is a separate entity that looks like a photographic negative version of Buckethead with a black chrome mask, like Darth Vader. This apparition haunts Buckethead and appears in his nightmares.

Buckethead released a second studio album that year, Giant Robot, which features many guest appearances by artists such as Iggy Pop and Bill Moseley. The name of the album came from the Japanese series Johnny Sokko and his Flying Robot, of which Buckethead is a fan. He also released two other albums with Praxis, their second and third studio efforts: Sacrifist and Metatron.

=== 1995–1999: Collaboration work, movie soundtracks and Praxis ===
In 1995, Buckethead did not release any solo albums but collaborated with several artists like Jonas Hellborg and Michael Shrieve (Octave of the Holy Innocents). He also contributed to several movie soundtracks, such as Johnny Mnemonic and Mortal Kombat.

Later, in 1996, Buckethead released his solo album The Day of the Robot with the help of English producer DJ Ninj and Laswell, plus another album with Brain and keyboardist Pete Scaturro on the small Japanese label NTT Records, called Giant Robot. Both albums were printed only in small quantities and are collector's items now. A second demo tape by the Deli Creeps was also recorded.

Also in 1996, several Sega Saturn television ads featuring a screaming mask-like face pressing through the blue orb of the Saturn logo was released, with music by Buckethead.

In 1997, Buckethead began working on the album Buckethead Plays Disney; however, the album has not yet been released. According to his Web page:

This highly anticipated album, once listed in an Avant catalog, has yet to be completed. It is Buckethead's most precious personal project, so he won't record or release it until he knows he is ready.

Also in 1997, Buckethead continued to contribute to movie soundtracks, appearing on Beverly Hills Ninja and Mortal Kombat: Annihilation, the sequel to Mortal Kombat.

Further releases were Arcana's second and final studio album Arc of the Testimony in which he played with noted drummer Tony Williams and the one-off project Pieces, with Brain. Two live albums by Praxis, called Transmutation Live and Live in Poland (featuring recordings from European concerts) were also issued.

Death Cube K released an album that year called Disembodied.

In 1998, Buckethead released Colma, an album dedicated to his mother, who at the time was suffering from colon cancer. A compilation album by Praxis called Coll ction also came out that year.

In 1999, Buckethead released his fifth album, a collaboration with Les Claypool from the band Primus, titled Monsters and Robots—currently the best-selling album of his career. The album includes the song "The Ballad of Buckethead", for which his first music video ever was made. Buckethead began three new projects that year, the first being the band Cornbugs, a collaboration with actor Bill Moseley, drummer Pinchface, and later keyboardist Travis Dickerson. Another project, Cobra Strike with an album called The 13th Scroll, featured Pinchface, Bryan "Brain" Mantia, DJ Disk, and Bill Laswell. Buckethead also began a collaboration with actor Viggo Mortensen, whom he first met through a recording project called Myth: Dreams of the World in 1996. Together they released One Man's Meat, One Less Thing to Worry About, and The Other Parade. Buckethead contributed to the 1999 album Devil Dub by the San Francisco Bay Area band Ben Wa consisting of "Dr. Ware" and "House"(Limbomaniacs, Tommy Guerrero, Buckethead's Giant Robot, MCM & the Monster).

=== 2000–2004: Guns N' Roses and other projects ===
Buckethead achieved a higher public profile as lead guitarist for Guns N' Roses from 2000 to 2004. He recorded the often-delayed album Chinese Democracy with the band and appeared live on stage in 2001 and 2002, including Rock in Rio 3, MTV's Video Music Awards, and parts of the Chinese Democracy Tour. His guitar solo on "There Was a Time" received acclaim, with several publications listing it amongst the best solos of the decade.

Despite being a member of GN'R, Buckethead released his sixth studio album, called Somewhere Over the Slaughterhouse in 2001, and also his only EP, called KFC Skin Piles. He also released two albums with his band Cornbugs, and a third under his 'Death Cube K' pseudonym. In 2000, Buckethead released the second and last album by Cobra Strike, called Cobra Strike II - Y, Y+B, X+Y. He joined two new projects during this period. The first was the progressive rock band Thanatopsis (named after a poem by William Cullen Bryant) with Travis Dickerson and drummer Ramy Antoun; this group went on to release four albums. Some Thanatopsis material has also appeared on albums released by Buckethead and Dickerson. Buckethead's second side project during this period was with Bill Laswell and Japanese producer Shin Terai, released as the album Unison.

In 2002, Buckethead released three studio albums: Funnel Weaver, a collection of 49 short tracks, Bermuda Triangle, and finally, Electric Tears, a calming album that is similar to his earlier release, Colma. When Laswell was not able to play with Praxis at the Bonnaroo Music and Arts festival, Les Claypool asked to jam with Brain, Bernie Worrell, and Buckethead, forming a new supergroup called Colonel Claypool's Bucket of Bernie Brains. The jamband experiment was successful enough to do some further live dates.

Later, in 2003, marking the release of his tenth studio album, Buckethead released the sequel of his debut Bucketheadland, simply called Bucketheadland 2. Together with actor Viggo Mortensen, he did Pandemoniumfromamerica, and with Thanatopsis, its second release, called Axiology.

Buckethead's relationship with Guns N' Roses was somewhat erratic in its last year, despite contractual obligations. According to an interview with Rose, he seemingly 'left' the band in January 2004 without telling anyone, and 'rejoined' in a similar manner in February. "His transient lifestyle has made it impossible for even his closest friends to have nearly any form of communication with him whatsoever." In March 2004, Buckethead left Guns N' Roses. His manager cited Guns' inability to complete an album or tour.

Since that time, his cult following in the underground music communities has steadily increased. He frequently performs at festivals and in clubs nationwide and often tours as the feature performer.

The year 2004 saw the release of three new studio albums: Island of Lost Minds, which was his first tour-only album being later re-released by TDRS Music; Population Override, a blues-rock tour de force with Dickerson; and The Cuckoo Clocks of Hell, considered his heaviest effort to date. The latter includes "Spokes for the Wheel of Torment," for which Syd Garon and Eric Henry made a music video based on the famous triptychs by Hieronymus Bosch. Buckethead also recorded the final two albums by the Cornbugs, Brain Circus and Donkey Town as well as another release with Viggo Mortensen called Please Tomorrow and a second with Shin Terai, titled Heaven & Hell. C2B3 also released their only album, The Big Eyeball in the Sky, and toured it in North America.

In an interview with Revolver, Ozzy Osbourne said that he had offered to have Buckethead play guitar in his band at Ozzfest, but changed his mind after meeting with him and realizing that he would not remove his costume:

"I tried out that Buckethead guy. I met with him and asked him to work with me, but only if he got rid of the fucking bucket. So I came back a bit later, and he's wearing this green fucking Martian's-hat thing! I said, 'Look, just be yourself.' He told me his name was Brian, so I said that's what I'd call him. He says, 'No one calls me Brian except my mother.' So I said, 'Pretend I'm your mum, then!' I haven't even got out of the room and I'm already playing fucking mind games with the guy. What happens if one day he's gone and there's a note saying, 'I've been beamed up'? Don't get me wrong, he's a great player. He plays like a motherfucker."

— Ozzy Osbourne, Revolver.

=== 2005–2006: Buckethead & Friends ===
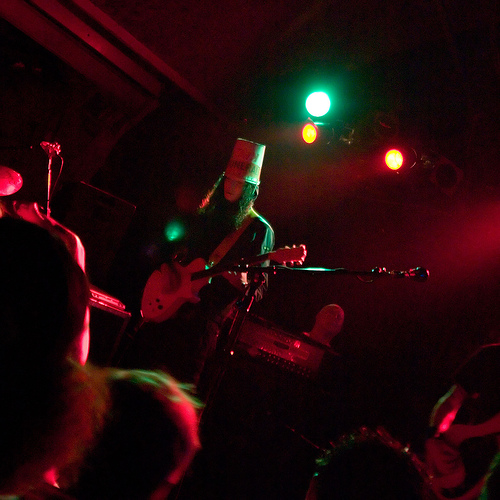
Buckethead and That 1 Guy, performing as The Frankenstein Brothers in 2006

In 2005, Buckethead released the album Enter the Chicken through Serj Tankian's record label, Serjical Strike. The album features Tankian himself, Maximum Bob (of the Deli Creeps), Death by Stereo singer Efrem Shulz, Bad Acid Trip and others. It is marked by its leaning toward more traditional song structures while still featuring typical Buckethead guitar skills. "We Are One" was released as a single and also appeared on the soundtrack of Masters of Horror. "Three Fingers" was used for the soundtrack of the horror movie Saw II. The final track, "Nottingham Lace", was first made public via his home page and soon became a concert staple and one of his most popular songs. Buckethead also released two further solo albums in 2005, Kaleidoscalp and Inbred Mountain—the latter being the first album as a solo artist released on the label TDRS Music. Both albums originally were sold exclusively at concerts and only later got an official release through the label's website.

Buckethead released albums with other bands that year: with Cornbugs, he released two compilation albums, called Rest Home for Robots and Skeleton Farm. Gorgone's self titled album was released that year' itself based upon recording sessions from the album Population Override that Buckethead released in 2004.

Main guitar riff of "Jordan"
Excerpt of "Jordan"
First two bars of "Jordan"

In 2006, the cross-console video game Guitar Hero II was launched, featuring Buckethead's song "Jordan" as an unlockable bonus track. Although the song has been performed live in the past, the video game version is the only known studio recording of the song. When playing it live, Buckethead would almost always simply perform the verse and chorus of "Jordan" before transitioning into the next song. However, the Guitar Hero II version contains a special solo created specifically for the game.

Also the same year, Buckethead released two DVDs, titled Young Buckethead Vol. 1 and Young Buckethead Vol. 2, featuring rare footage from 1990 and 1991. The DVD also contains three complete Deli Creeps shows, a sound check, backstage footage, and solo footage of just Buckethead. He also released the albums The Elephant Man's Alarm Clock and Crime Slunk Scene, both sold on his tours but later sold on the TDRS Music website. The last album has the song "Soothsayer (Dedicated to Aunt Suzie)"; this song (along with "Jordan" and "Nottingham Lace") is one of his most popular songs and is often played live. Buckethead released his final compilation album with the band Cornbugs, called Celebrity Psychos. He also released an album with Travis Dickerson, called Chicken Noodles, a move that would see the start of a four-year long collaboration with the keyboardist. Buckethead's band Thanatopsis would also release Anatomize that year.

=== 2007–2010: Continued solo work and Michael Jackson tribute ===
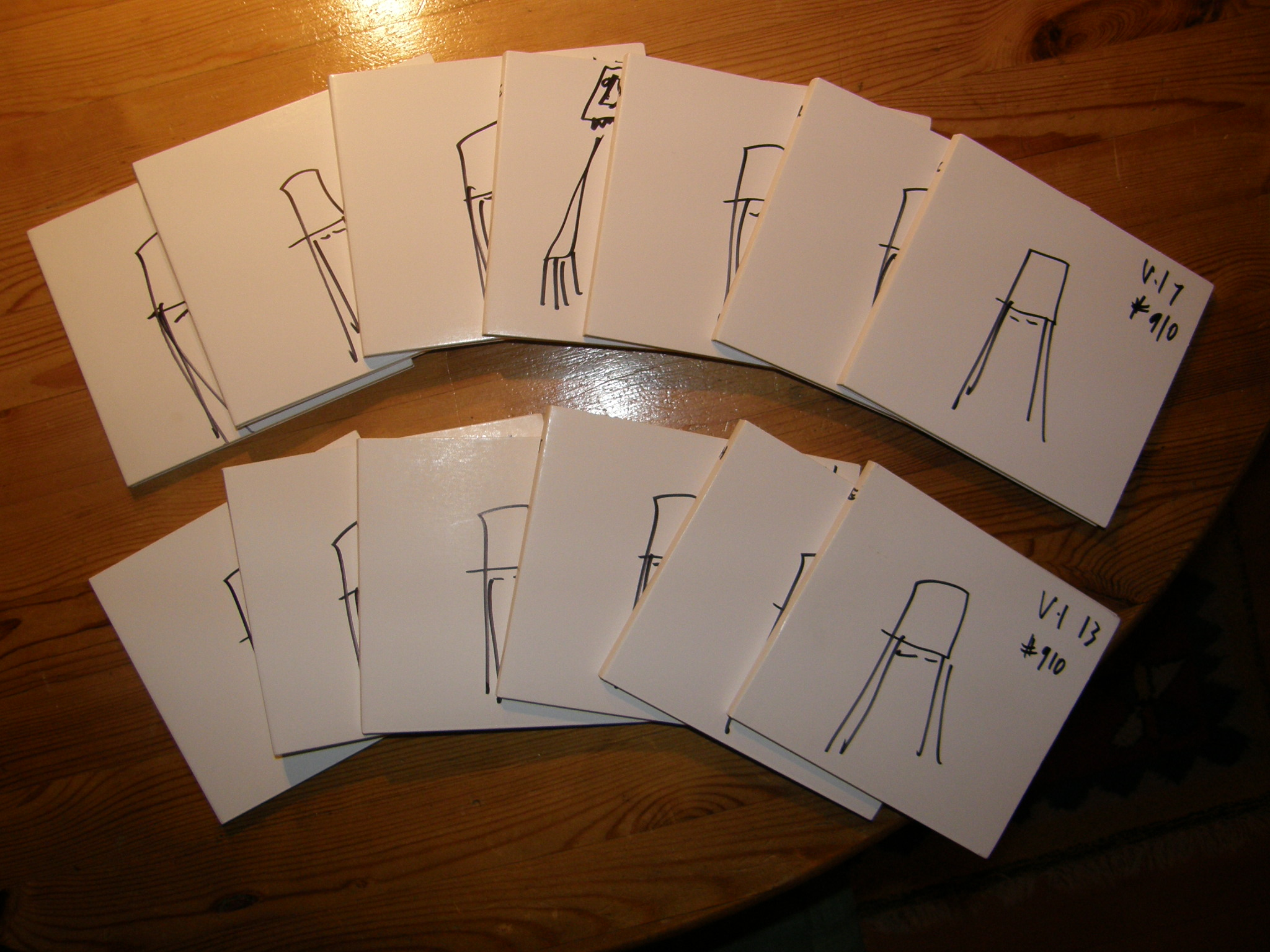
The massive In Search of The box set, a set of 13 albums by Buckethead, along with each copy's cover being hand-drawn differently

In 2007, Buckethead released an unprecedented amount of new material. In February, a box set titled In Search of The, containing 13 albums of original material, was released. It was handcrafted, numbered, and monogrammed by Buckethead and contained over nine hours of music. A regular solo album, called Pepper's Ghost, was released in March. A disc of acoustic improvisations called Acoustic Shards was also released, becoming the twentieth studio album that the artist had released so far in his solo career. In midyear, he reissued his demo tape Bucketheadland Blueprints, with two alternative album covers: a special edition with a hand-drawn cover made by him, or a standard edition with the original cover art. In October, he released his final two albums of the year, called Decoding the Tomb of Bansheebot and Cyborg Slunks. The latter again came in both a hand-drawn limited edition and (some weeks later) as a normal CD. Buckethead wrote three songs dedicated to Aunt Suzie in 2006-07: the aforementioned "Soothsayer" (Crime Slunk Scene), "Aunt Suzie" (Cyborg Slunks), and "Sail On Soothsayer", (Decoding The Tomb Of Bansheebot).

As Death Cube K, Buckethead released two albums in 2007: an album called DCK, limited to 400 hand-numbered copies and released in August; and in December, the 5-CD box set Monolith, which consisted of one unbroken track per CD.

During 2007, Buckethead also collaborated and appeared on numerous albums with other artists. The sequel to Chicken Noodles (a collaboration with Travis Dickerson), simply called Chicken Noodles II, was issued by TDRS in December. A live record by Praxis, titled Tennessee 2004; the third album with Shin Terai, called Lightyears; and another album with drummer Bryan Mantia, called Kevin's Noodle House, were also released through the year.

That same year, it was revealed that Buckethead joined a project by the name of Science Faxtion, a band featuring bassist Bootsy Collins and drummer Bryan "Brain" Mantia, with Greg Hampton supplying lead vocals. Their first album, called Living on Another Frequency, was delayed several times and was finally released in November 2008.

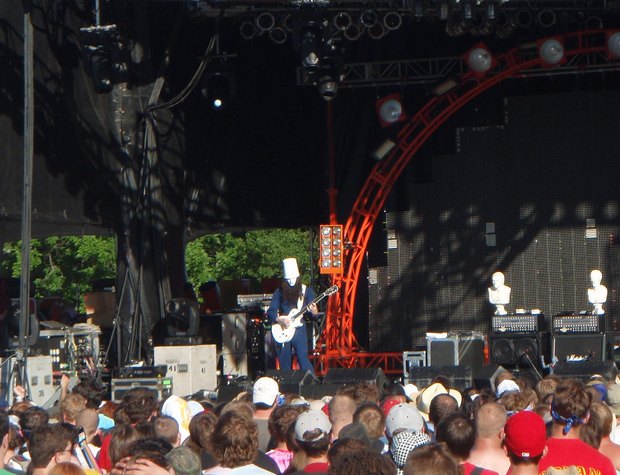
Buckethead live at Wakarusa, 2008

On January 1, 2008, the band Praxis released the long-awaited album Profanation (Preparation for a Coming Darkness) in Japan. The album had actually been recorded in 2005, but had to be put on hold when the original label went bankrupt. That year Buckethead released From the Coop through the label Avabella (where he released Acoustic Shards), consisting of the demos Buckethead gave to Jas Obrecht back in 1988. This CD also included the first ever "official" biography of/by the artist. Later that same year, he announced the release of the album called Albino Slug (a tour-only CD until official release on December of the same year). Along with this album, he appeared on the album The Dragons of Eden, with Dickerson and Mantia, and in collaboration with That 1 Guy as the Frankenstein Brothers, an album called Bolt on Neck was released. That 1 Guy and Buckethead toured together through fall 2008, playing songs from this album.

Buckethead also appeared in the documentary American Music: Off the Record, in which he appears only playing. Serj Tankian's label, Serjical Strike, reissued the album Enter the Chicken with an extra song. Furthermore, Buckethead contributed to one track of actor Viggo Mortensen's album At All, and with Travis Dickerson and filmmaker Alix Lambert on the album Running After Deer.

Buckethead appeared with Bootsy Collins in Cincinnati, Ohio, to promote the vote for the 2008 United States presidential election for the organization Rock the Vote. He also joined Collins on Fallen Soldiers Memorial, an album with proceeds going to the National Fallen Heroes Foundation.

More than four years after his departure from the band Guns N' Roses, Chinese Democracy was made available. Buckethead appears on all but two songs and was given writing credits on "Shackler's Revenge" (which appeared in the popular video game Rock Band 2); "Scraped"; and "Sorry", which features guest singer Sebastian Bach. The album features eleven of Buckethead's guitar solos.

On December 30, 2008, Buckethead released two new tracks via his website to honor basketball player LeBron James's 24th birthday. These tracks were later made available on the album, Slaughterhouse on the Prairie, which was released a month later through TDRS Music. In 2009, he released the albums A Real Diamond in the Rough, and Forensic Follies, which was first sold at some of his tour dates but later released on TDRS. He also released the track The Homing Beacon that year; the song is a tribute to Michael Jackson, who had been an early influence on him. The song was later included on his 2012 album Electric Sea.

On February 5, 2010, Buckethead released an album called Shadows Between the Sky and later that month, Gibson released the Buckethead Signature Les Paul guitar.

On April 29, 2010, Buckethead's website was updated with a picture with the message "Greetings from Bucketheadland... Buckethead wants you to know he appreciates your support all these years, it means so much to him. Buckethead is having some animatronic parts replaced, Slip Disc snuck into the park and caused some mayhem." The mention of Slip Disc is a reference to a Bucketheadland nemesis found on the Bucketheadland album. Bootsy Collins continued to update his Twitter Web site about Buckethead's condition, stating that he had recently gone into therapy for a few months.

Nevertheless, after returning from injury on July 15, 2010, Buckethead, along with Brain and Melissa Reese, released the first of a series of three 5-CD box sets called Best Regards. On August 25, 2010, Buckethead announced his 28th studio album titled Spinal Clock, which showcased his banjo skills. In October, two albums with Brain were released in collaboration, the first called Brain as Hamenoodle, and the second installment of the "Regards" series with Brain and Melissa Reese called, Kind Regards. Eventually, both projects were released on October 13. That month also saw a new solo album titled Captain EO's Voyage first available only on iTunes. It was later announced that a physical edition would be released on December 1. This, along with Buckethead's final Travis Dickerson album were released on November 29. In May 2010, Buckethead started to release albums as part of the concept of a kiosk within Buckethead's fictional "abusement" park called "Buckethead Pikes". The albums released under this concept were to resemble a comic book style and be shorter in length than his previous works - around half-an-hour each.

=== 2011–2015: Focus on solo Pikes ===
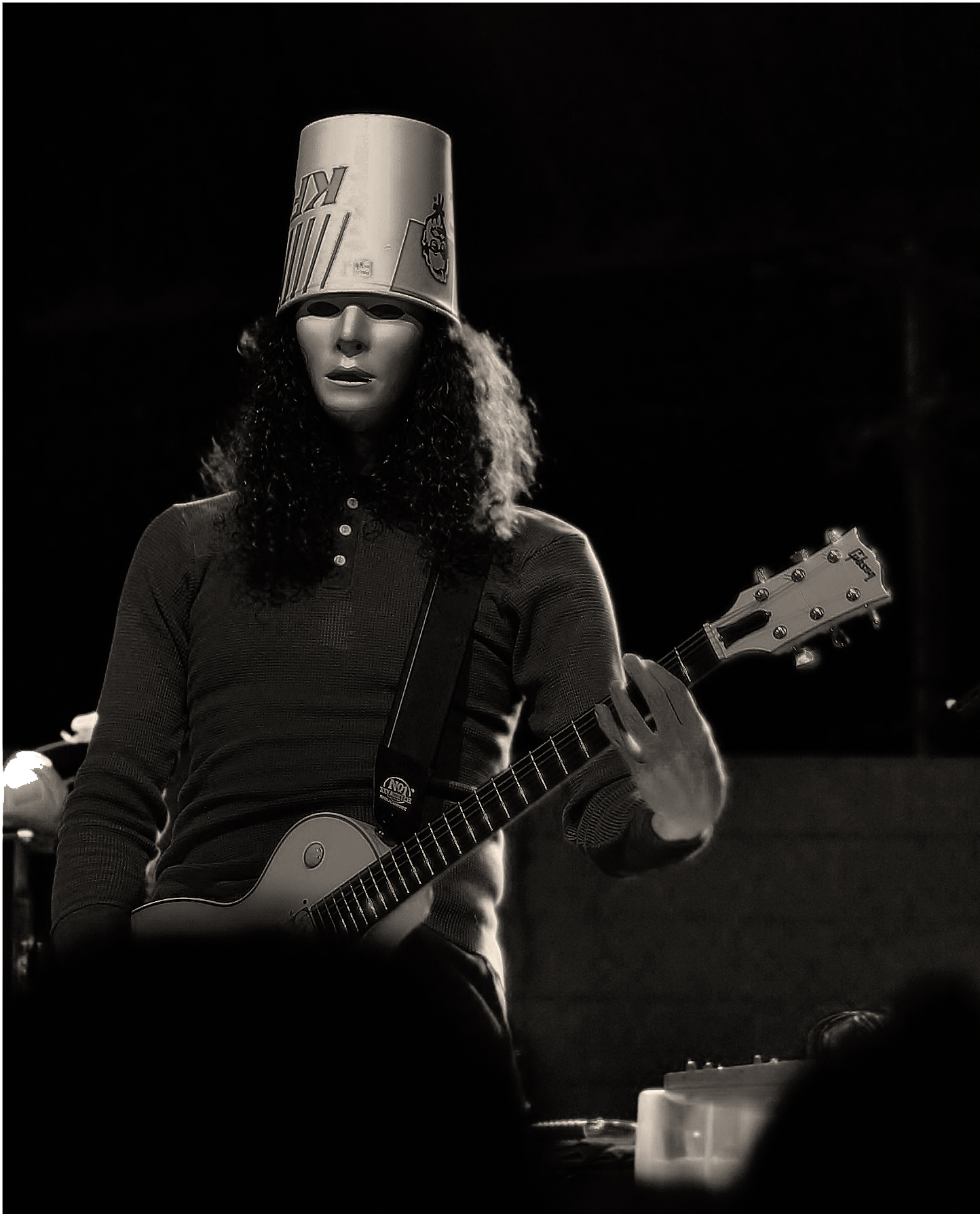
Buckethead live in Syracuse, 2011

Buckethead left Praxis in 2011, the Frankenstein Brothers in 2012, and Brain in 2013. He contributed to two tracks on Lawson Rollins's album Elevation in 2011. He also departed from his live touring schedule, with his final performance taking place on December 31, 2012. During his absence from touring and other projects, Buckethead's solo release schedule increased speed dramatically- reaching a peak in 2015 with 118 albums, around one every three days on average. Notably, the cover of Pike 13 contains a photograph of Buckethead unmasked; the first such image released to the public. The cover of Pike 13 does not feature the common elements of the Pikes series, and is simply a photograph of Buckethead during his teenage years, carrying an acoustic guitar and hugging his father. Buckethead continued to release albums throughout the year, breaking the numerical order occasionally (for example, Pike 34 Pikes was released three weeks after Pike 35 Thank you Ohlinger's). The final album of the year Wishes was released on December 24, free of charge for a limited time.

Solo albums released each year
Year
2010	4
2011	4
2012	6
2013	31
2014	60
2015	118
2016	24
2017	30
2018	2
2019	0
2020	10
2021	9
2022	26
2023	119
2024	45
2025	18

During 2014, Buckethead continued releasing albums at an even faster pace. Sixty albums were released throughout the year, averaging one album every six days. The sixty-fifth installment, Hold Me Forever (In memory of my mom Nancy York Carroll), honored Buckethead's mother, who had recently died. The final release of the year, Pike 101 In the Hollow Hills, took place on December 31.

Buckethead's release schedule increased in speed again, almost doubling his output during 2015. The 150th release in the series and 180th overall, Heaven is your Home (For my Father, Thomas Manley Carroll), was released free on June 21 (Father's Day) and in dedication to his late father.

On October 1, Buckethead started The Silver Shamrock Series, a Halloween-themed series in which the guitarist released one dark ambient album per day. Starting with Pike 176, 31 Days Til Halloween: Visitor From The Mirror, each subsequent album continued the countdown to Halloween's eve; it culminated with Pike 206, Happy Halloween: Silver Shamrock. Buckethead's next release, 365 Days Til Halloween: Smash (released on November 1) referenced the countdown, but is not considered part of series. A physical edition of the series was released in October 2017 on a pumpkin-themed USB key that contains all 31 albums on it.

The last album of the year was Pike 219, "Rain Drops on Christmas". The album originally released as a free digital download on December 24 (Christmas Eve), included a dedication "to those who lost loved ones" in the title track.

=== 2016–present: Continued Pikes, return to touring, and reissues ===
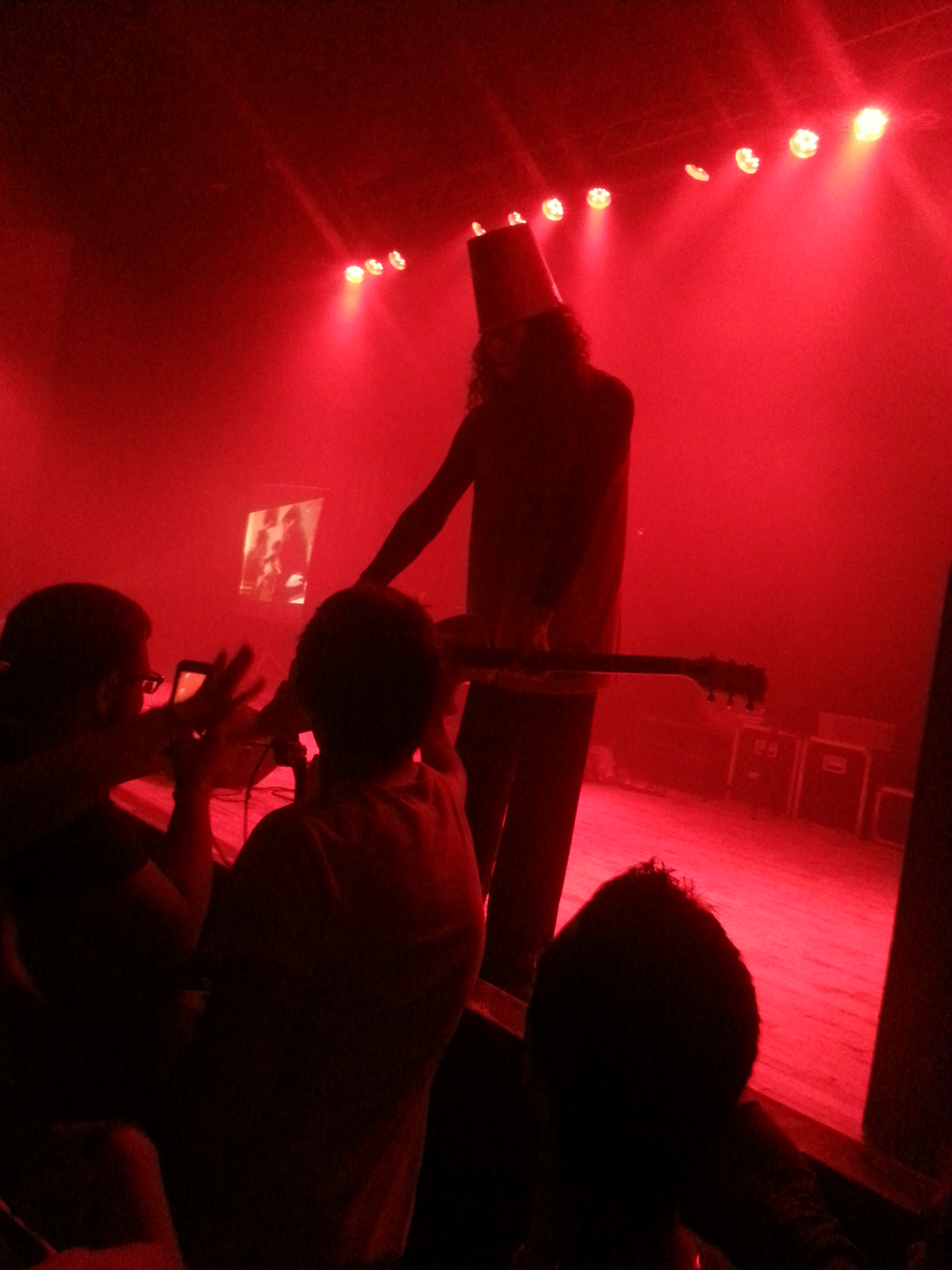
Buckethead letting fans use the kill switch on his guitar during his show at the Granada in Lawrence, Kansas on April 15, 2016

Throughout 2016, Buckethead's release output declined sharply, with only 24 albums being released. Pike 226, "Happy Birthday MJ 23" was released on the 53rd birthday of basketball player Michael Jordan. 2016 also saw Buckethead return to touring, after a four-year absence.

2017 saw a slight increase in pace compared to the previous year, with 30 albums being released in total. In addition, Buckethead began to re-press part of his older catalogue in vinyl format, the first time in over a decade that his albums have been pressed in a physical format other than CD. Inbred Mountain, The Elephant Man's Alarm Clock, Crime Slunk Scene, Decoding the Tomb of Bansheebot, Albino Slug, Slaughterhouse on the Prairie, A Real Diamond in the Rough, and Shadows Between the Sky were all announced for vinyl. Several reissues came in a variety of different packages, unique to each release. Some included signed copies, limited-edition posters or photographs, personalized recordings, and more. As part of these reissues, the albums Albino Slug and Decoding the Tombs of Bansheebot underwent major changes, with songs being re-recorded, and their album cover and title changed as well. Pike 241 "Sparks in the Dark" was also announced on vinyl.

Also announced was the release of "Bucketheadland 5-13 10-31", an entirely new album to be released on Halloween 2017 exclusively on vinyl. It was the first album since 2012's Electric Sea not to be a part of the Pike series. In addition, Bootsy Collins announced he was working with Buckethead once again on a collaborative album set to be released in that year.

In August 2017, Buckethead announced his fall US tour would be in September and October. Buckethead played with a live band consisting of Brain on drums and Dan Monti on bass during the tour, departing from his traditional touring routine in which Buckethead was the only performer on stage. Shortly after the tour announcement, Buckethead also announced the release of "Live from Bucketheadland", his first live album, which was released on vinyl in January 2018. Buckethead's tour continued in 2018, reverting to a solo show. Buckethead also toured in 2019 across the United States, with a spring run beginning on March 1. In October 2019, he and Bootsy Collins released a cover of "Monster Mash", with a video directed by Ouiwey Collins.

Buckethead's release output slowed again in the early 2020s. In 2020 he issued only a handful of Pike albums, among them Healing Inside Outside Every Side (Pike 276), Division Is the Devil's Playground (Pike 277), Skeleton Keys (Pike 279) and In Dreamland (Pike 280, released in November). The numbered series continued out of sequence from 2021, beginning with Electrum (Pike 287). Live performances resumed in the early 2020s, and he continued to tour the United States in 2023.

In 2024, Buckethead released Veins of Institution, a nine-track collaborative album with vocalist Madeline Cyrille Miller, on May 4. Miller joined him on tour as vocalist alongside Monti and Brain, and the live sets paired Buckethead originals and covers, such as Iron Maiden's "Wrathchild", with songs from the collaboration, such as "Solar and Lunar Rain".

By late 2024, Buckethead was touring with a new guitarist, Charlotte O'Boyle, who performs as COB. The live band included COB and Monti, who also sang covers such as Black Sabbath's "War Pigs". COB, a former fan, was later described by Riff Magazine as a "part-time collaborator" who joined him for extended guitar duets while wearing a mask. The pair also began releasing joint albums including A Voice from the Ocean and 7 Veils from the Temple of Mirrors (both June 2025), Ascend into the Castle (January 2026), The Field Has Eyes (February 2026), and Slugs in the Mist.

Buckethead also resumed working with Bootsy Collins, and in July 2026 they released Metal Health, a 16-track collaborative album. It features guest appearances from Robert Trujillo, Victor Wooten, Samuel L. Jackson, Eric Gales, Jennifer Batten and Billy Sheehan, and was presented as part of Collins's mental-health awareness initiative. Buckethead continued to tour in 2025 and 2026, including a show at the Warfield in San Francisco on October 17, 2025, where he displayed a poster of KISS guitarist Ace Frehley, who had died earlier that week.

== Influences ==
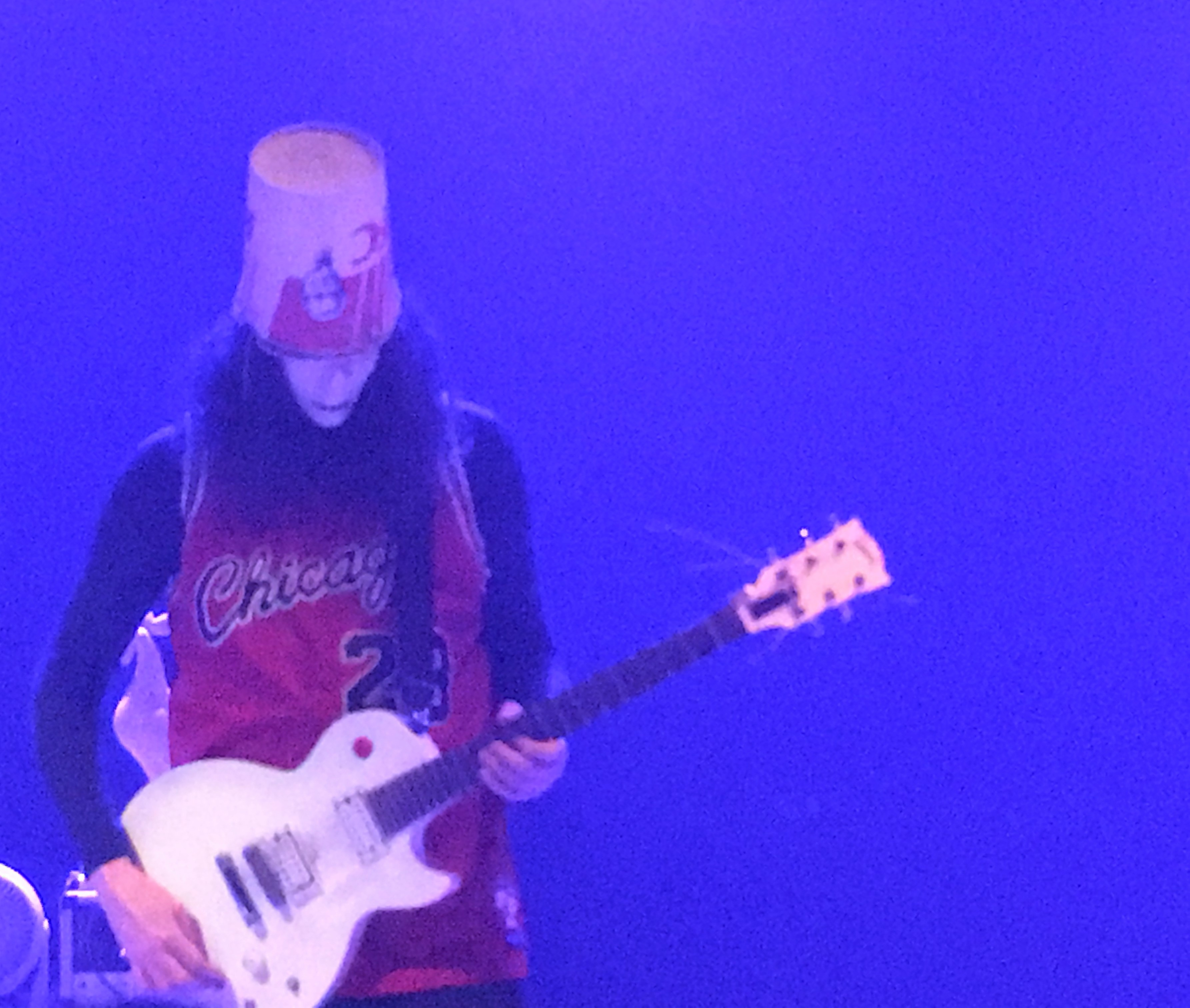
Buckethead wearing a Michael Jordan jersey, a major influence on his songs

Buckethead cites a wide variety of musical influences, including Michael Jackson, Parliament-Funkadelic, Shawn Lane, Michael Schenker, Uli Jon Roth, Paul Gilbert, Yngwie Malmsteen, Joe Satriani, Eddie Hazel, Randy Rhoads, Larry LaLonde, Mike Patton, James Cutri, Louis Johnson, Jimi Hendrix, Jennifer Batten, The Residents, Eddie Van Halen, and Angus Young as well as the many artists he has collaborated with over the years.

In addition to his musical influences, Buckethead cites a diverse range of non-musical influences, out of which dedicated songs to said inspirations have been a staple of Buckethead's discography, with particular attention to basketball players like Michael Jordan (songs "Jordan" and "Jump Man", album "Happy Birthday MJ 23"), George Gervin (on "Iceman"), Blake Griffin (on "Crack the Sky" and "Griffin's Spike"), "Pistol" Pete Maravich (on "The Mark of Davis"), LeBron James (with four songs dedicated to him), and Kareem Abdul-Jabbar (album "Kareem's Footprint"). Other influences include martial artist and actor Bruce Lee (on "The Game of Death" song and inspiration behind the use of nunchakus on stage), author H. P. Lovecraft (on the "Lurker at the Threshold" suite, and his 55th Pike, The Miskatonic Scale), numerous science fiction and horror TV shows and movies including Little House on the Prairie, Alejandro Jodorowsky's The Holy Mountain (on Kaleidoscalp), and Giant Robot (mentioned on several songs, albums, and episodes shown on stage). Disney and Disneyland are also major influences on Buckethead's career. Buckethead is also inspired by Japanese filmmaker Takashi Miike, to whom a song on Pepper's Ghost is dedicated. The Texas Chain Saw Massacre franchise of movies is also a big inspiration to him and he has written many songs such as Jowls, which are heavily inspired by those movies. The song "To Infinity and Beyond" from Out Orbit was dedicated to then-recently deceased basketball reporter Craig Sager.

== Equipment ==
=== Guitars ===
- Gibson Buckethead Signature Les Paul
- Jackson Buckethead Signature Roundhorn V
- Gibson SST
- Gibson 1969 Les Paul Custom
- Custom built Jackson Doubleneck

=== Effects ===
- Boss NS-2 Noise Suppressor
- Electro-Harmonix Micro Synthesizer
- MXR Phase 90

=== Amplifiers ===
- Mesa/Boogie Triple Rectifier
- Marshall cabinets
- EVH 5150III 50-watt 6L6 Tube Head - Ivory cabinet

== Bands and projects ==
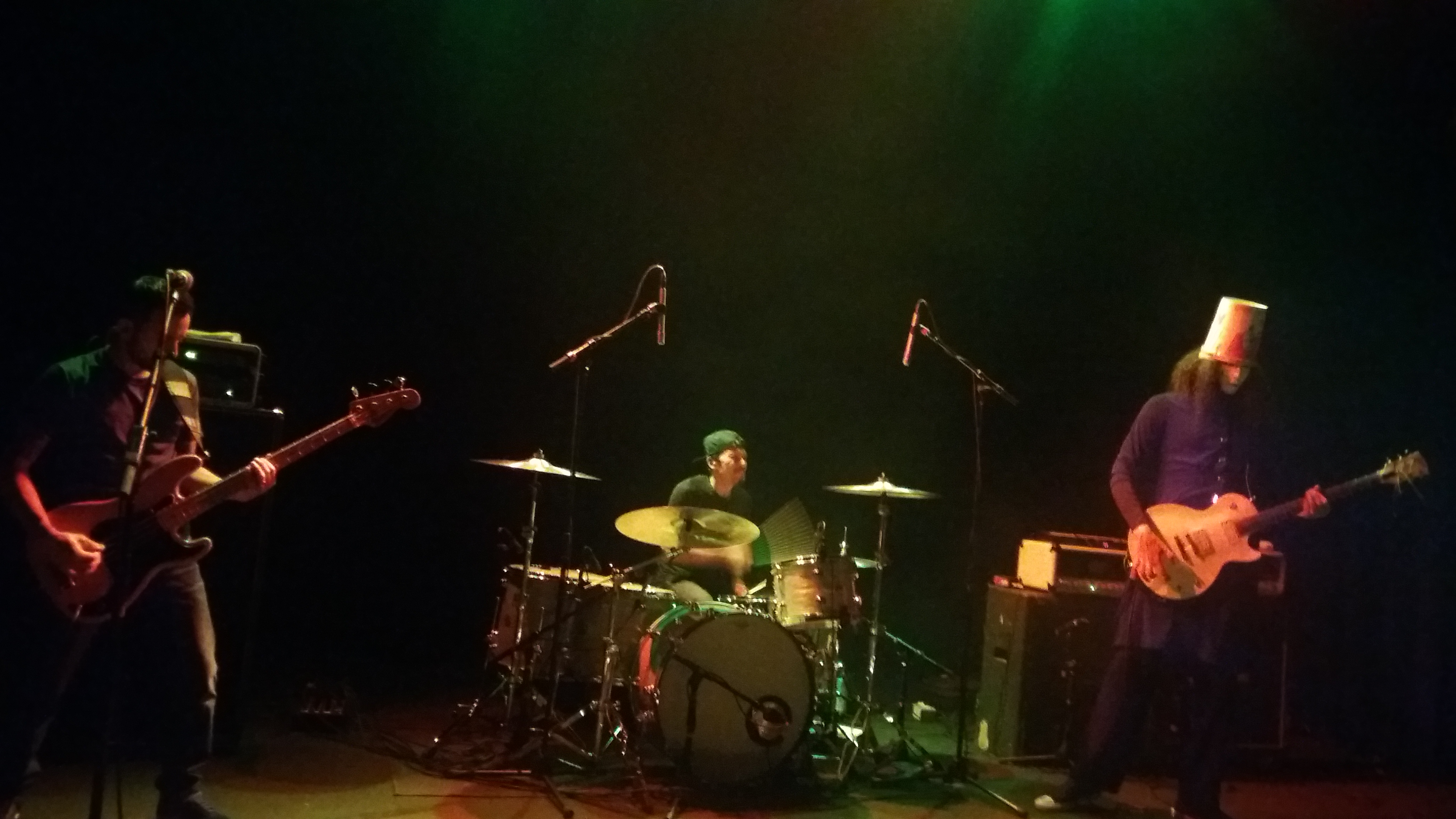
Brewer, Brain, and Buckethead in 2017.

- Solo career (1987–present)
- with Class-X (1987–1988)
- with Limbomaniacs (1990)
- with Deli Creeps (1990–2007)
- with Praxis (1992–2011, 2022)
- with Zillatron (1993)
- as Death Cube K (1994–1999, 2007–2009, 2022–present)
- with Jonas Hellborg and Michael Shrieve (1995)
- with Cornbugs (1995–2007)
- with Giant Robot & Giant Robot II (1996–1998, 2004–2006)
- with DJ Disk (1996–2001)
- with Brain (1997–2013)
- with El Stew (1999)
- with Cobra Strike (1999–2000)
- with Shin Terai (1999–2007)
- with Viggo Mortensen (1999, 2003–2005, 2008–2013)
- with Guns N' Roses (2000–2004)
- with Thanatopsis (2001–2006, 2016)
- with Colonel Claypool's Bucket of Bernie Brains (2002–2004)
- with Travis Dickerson (2004–2010)
- as The Frankenstein Brothers (with That 1 Guy) (2006–2012)
- with Science Faxtion (2007–2008)
- with Lawson Rollins (2011)
- with Brewer and Brain (2017)
- with Madeline Cyrille Miller (2024)
- with COB and Brewer (2024-present)

== Discography ==
Buckethead has released 31 solo studio albums, as well as over 800 albums in the "Pike Series."

Solo studio albums

- Bucketheadland (1992)
- Giant Robot (1994)
- The Day of the Robot (1996)
- Colma (1998)
- Monsters and Robots (1999)
- Somewhere Over the Slaughterhouse (2001)
- Funnel Weaver (2002)
- Bermuda Triangle (2002)
- Electric Tears (2002)
- Bucketheadland 2 (2003)
- Island of Lost Minds (2004)
- Population Override (2004)
- The Cuckoo Clocks of Hell (2004)
- Enter the Chicken (2005)
- Kaleidoscalp (2005)
- Inbred Mountain (2005)
- The Elephant Man's Alarm Clock (2006)
- Crime Slunk Scene (2006)
- Pepper's Ghost (2007)
- Decoding the Tomb of Bansheebot (2007)
- Cyborg Slunks (2007)
- Albino Slug (2008)
- Slaughterhouse on the Prairie (2009)
- A Real Diamond in the Rough (2009)
- Forensic Follies (2009)
- Needle in a Slunk Stack (2009)
- Shadows Between the Sky (2010)
- Spinal Clock (2010)
- Captain EO's Voyage (2010)
- Electric Sea (2012)
- Bucketheadland 5-13 10-31 (2017)

Pike Series

Buckethead Pikes are mini-albums. Over 800 have been released since 2011. They have an average runtime of 30 minutes.

== See also ==
- Wave Twisters, 2001 animation featuring Buckethead
