= Cornbugs =

American avant-garde metal band

- Origin: Texas, USA
- Genres: Avant-garde metal progressive metal alternative metal
- Years active: 1995–2007
- Labels: TDRS, Rack-O
- Past members: Bill Moseley; Buckethead; Pinchface; Travis Dickerson

Cornbugs was an American avant-garde metal band formed in 1995. Comprising vocalist Bill "Choptop" Moseley, guitarist Buckethead, drummer Pinchface and keyboardist Travis Dickerson, the band released five albums, two DVDs, and three compilation albums before they split up in 2007. The songs were heavily inspired by The Texas Chain Saw Massacre and its sequel The Texas Chainsaw Massacre 2, with Bill Mosley playing his character, Chop Top Sawyer, from the latter.

== Biography ==
The band released their first album, Spot the Psycho, in 1999. The band didn't release anything else until 2001, when they released their second album, Cemetery Pinch, and third album, How Now Brown Cow, simultaneously. All three albums were self-released and sold via Moseley's website.

In 2004 the Cornbugs released their fourth album called Brain Circus. This album was released on the label of their new keyboardist Travis Dickerson, TDRS Music. Later that same year they released their fifth and final studio album of new material called Donkey Town.

In 2005 and 2006, TDRS Music compiled most of Cornbugs' early self-released material and remastered it, releasing it on the albums Rest Home for Robots, Skeleton Farm and Celebrity Psychos.

The band announced their split in 2007 after two DVDs, Quackers! and Headcheese were made available.

The band contributed three songs on the tattoo instructional DVD, "Dead Man's Ruin - Advanced Tattoo Techniques" by Derek Dufresne, a tattoo artist from Victoria, British Columbia, Canada.

== Band members ==
- Bill "Choptop" Moseley – vocals
- Buckethead – guitars
- Pinchface – drums
- Travis Dickerson – keyboards (2003–2007)

== Discography ==
Studio albums

- Spot The Psycho (1999)
- Cemetery Pinch (2001)
- How Now Brown Cow (2001)
- Brain Circus (2004)
- Donkey Town (2004)

Compilation albums

- Rest Home for Robots (2005)
- Skeleton Farm (2005)
- Celebrity Psychos (2006)

DVDs

- Quackers! (2007)
- Headcheese (2007)
