= Dan Monti =

American musician and record producer

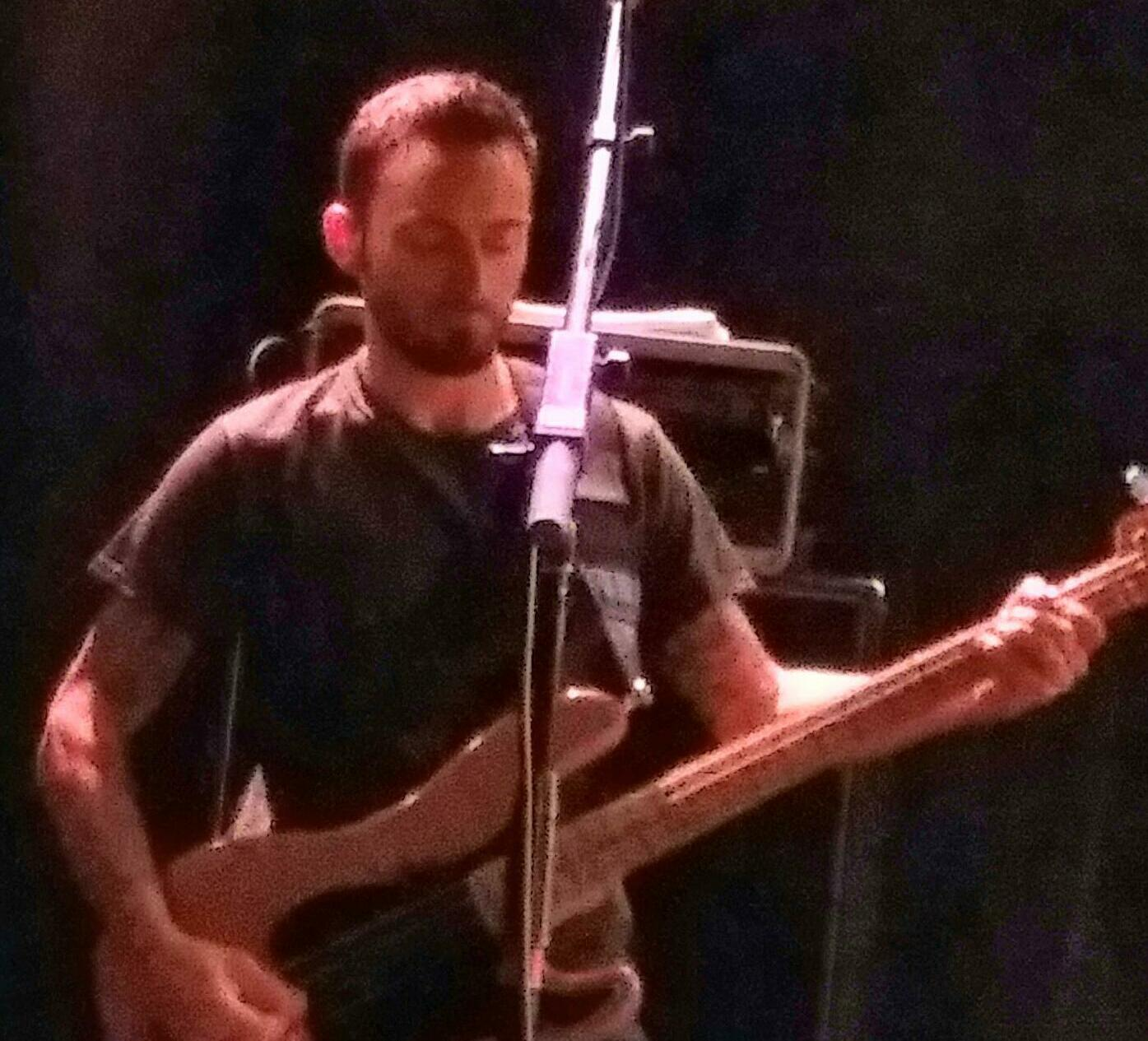
- Dan Monti in 2017

Background information
- Also known as: Del Rey Brewer
- Genres: Heavy metal, experimental, alternative metal, progressive rock, alternative rock, art rock
- Occupation(s): Musician, record producer, audio engineer
- Instrument(s): Guitar, bass, synthesizer, drums
- Years active: 2001–present
- Formerly of: Buckethead
- Website: danmonti.com

Dan Monti, also known by his stage name Del Rey Brewer or simply Brewer, is an American musician, record producer and audio engineer who has worked with such bands as Metallica, Slayer and Guns N' Roses. The bulk of his work, however, has been in conjunction with Buckethead, with whom he has also toured as a bassist.

== Musical career ==
Monti is a guitarist, bassist, and drummer, frequently adding bass parts to Buckethead albums. Monti co-produces, programs the drums and plays bass on nearly all of Buckethead's expansive Pike series.

He is also the lead guitarist for the Serj Tankian's touring band Flying Cunts of Chaos. The band released their first single "Daysheet Blues" on iTunes in July 2010. He is also the lead vocalist for F.C.C.

He toured with Buckethead and Brain in 2017. In 2024 he again toured with Buckethead as his drummer.

== Production career ==
Monti has been credited on many albums in his career, the first being Bucketheadland 2 in 2003. He has since gone on to produce most of Buckethead's albums, a few examples being Pepper's Ghost, Decoding the Tomb of Bansheebot, and Cyborg Slunks. The first one contains a track "Brewer in the Air", presumably inscribed to Del Rey Brewer. He is also credited on many of these albums as the bassist, as well as co-writer and mixer.

Monti has contributed to many high-profile bands' albums, including Serj Tankian's solo albums. He is listed for "additional engineering" or as "assistant engineer" on Guns N' Roses album Chinese Democracy, on which Buckethead also featured, as well as being credited for "digital editing" on Metallica's Death Magnetic and Slayer's World Painted Blood.
