= Buckethead discography =

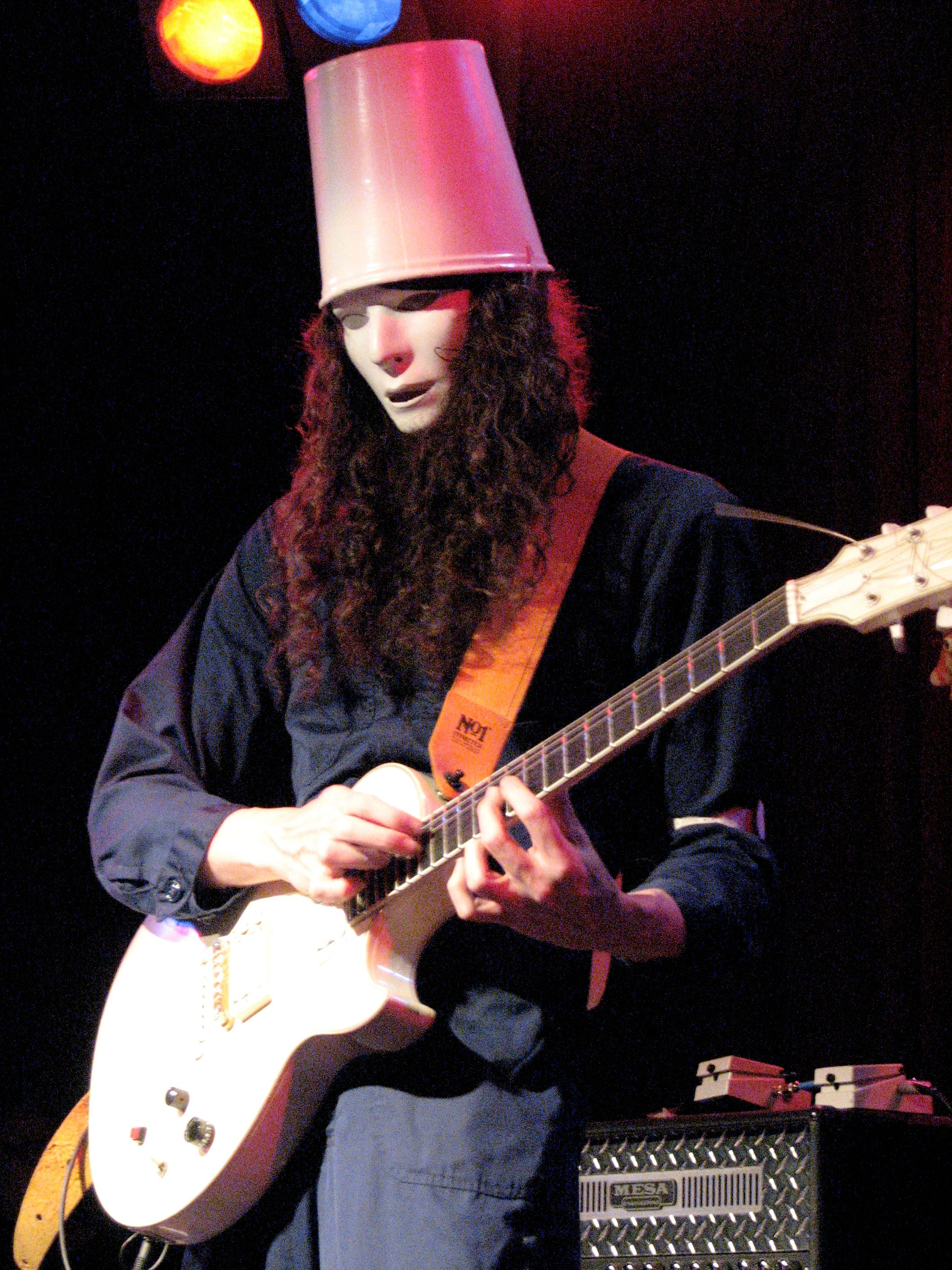
- Buckethead performing in 2008
- Studio albums: 31
- Music videos: 5
- Pike albums: 897
- Special releases: 5
- Solo DVD Videos: 4

Buckethead is an American guitarist and multi-instrumentalist. Buckethead's extensive solo discography currently includes 31 studio albums, one live album, two extended plays, five special releases, six demo tapes, & four DVD releases. Since 2011, Buckethead started releasing albums in the "Pikes" series, mini albums usually around 30 minutes in length, each with a sequential number similar to a comic book. Buckethead has released 897 Pike albums, 273 of which are live albums.

Buckethead has also released seven studio albums under the alias Death Cube K (an anagram of Buckethead). He has released collaborative albums with Brain, Travis Dickerson, Melissa Reese, Viggo Mortensen, Shin Terai, DJ Disk, Bootsy Collins, That 1 Guy and albums with the bands Praxis, Cornbugs, Science Faxtion, Guns N' Roses, Colonel Claypool's Bucket of Bernie Brains, and Deli Creeps, in addition to many other collaborations with bands and artists.

== Solo ==
=== Studio albums ===
Year	LP	Album	Length	Released	Label	Format
1992	1	Bucketheadland	74:56	February 5 (July 2, 1993 as import)	Avant (Avan 007)	2 CD
1994	2	Giant Robot	73:31	November 3 (Re-issued Sep 18, 2000 through CyberOctave)	Sony Japan (SRCS 7494)	CD
1996	3	The Day of the Robot	42:44	April 30	Sub Meta (SM-9804-2)	CD
1998	4	Colma	54:27	March 24	CyberOctave (COCD 45380)	CD
1999	5	Monsters and Robots	50:54	April 20	CyberOctave (COCD 47499)	CD
2001	6	Somewhere Over the Slaughterhouse	46:55	June 5	Stray (SR0016)	CD, 2LP
2002	7	Funnel Weaver	60:06	February 15	Ion (IN 2016–2)	CD
2002	8	Bermuda Triangle	49:32	July 23	Catalyst (CECD1000)	CD
2002	9	Electric Tears	70:58	October 8	Metastation (MT-0015)	CD
2003	10	Bucketheadland 2	58:24	October 14	Ion (IN 2019–2)	CD
2004	11	Island of Lost Minds	47:32	March 19 (Re-released on February 16, 2006)	Bucketheadland	CD
2004	12	Population Override	55:22	March 30	Ion (IN 2020–2)	CD
2004	13	The Cuckoo Clocks of Hell	52:16	April 20	Disembodied (BRO370)	CD
2005	14	Enter the Chicken	41:21	October 25 (Reissue April 8, 2008, Instrumental August 12, 2022)	Serjical Strike, Bucketheadland (Instrumental)	CD
2005	15	Kaleidoscalp	53:31	November 22	Tzadik (TZ 7409)	CD
2005	16	Inbred Mountain	43:21	December 2 (Vinyl edition: January 2018)	TDRS, Bucketheadland	CD, LP
2006	17	The Elephant Man's Alarm Clock	47:14	February 17 (Vinyl edition: August 1, 2017)	Bucketheadland	CD, LP
2006	18	Crime Slunk Scene	44:21	September 15 (Vinyl edition: August 1, 2017)	Bucketheadland	CD, LP
2007	19	Pepper's Ghost	45:16	March 1	Hatboxghost Music	CD
2007	20	Decoding the Tomb of Bansheebot / Ghost Host	46:46	October 30 (Vinyl edition: December 15, 2017)	Hatboxghost Music, Bucketheadland	CD, LP, DVD
2007	21	Cyborg Slunks	44:16	October 30 (Regular Edition: December 15)	TDRS	CD-R/CD
2008	22	Albino Slug / Clockunwise	40:09	September 17 (Worldwide: December 1, Vinyl: November 15, 2017)	Hatboxghost Music, Bucketheadland	CD, LP, DVD
2009	23	Slaughterhouse on the Prairie	41:48	January 30 (Vinyl edition: October 9, 2017)	Hatboxghost Music, Bucketheadland	CD, LP
2009	24	A Real Diamond in the Rough	41:46	May 1 (Vinyl edition: September 15, 2017)	Hatboxghost Music, Bucketheadland	CD, LP
2009	25	Forensic Follies	42:53	June 1	Hatboxghost Music	CD
2009	26	Needle in a Slunk Stack	40:41	September 24	Hatboxghost Music	CD
2010	27	Shadows Between the Sky	44:54	February 6 (Vinyl edition: August 15, 2017, No drums version: November 2, 2022)	Hatboxghost Music, Bucketheadland	CD, LP, Digital
2010	28	Spinal Clock	44:20	September 16	TDRS	CD
2010	29	Captain EO's Voyage	41:34	October 20 (CD release: November 29)	Hatboxghost Music	iTunes/CD
2012	35	Electric Sea	48:05	February 21	Metastation	
2017	304	Bucketheadland 5-13 10-31	31:00	Spring 2018 (regular, signed & limited editions) (download: November 2017)	Bucketheadland	LP, cassette, DVD

=== Pike Series ===
The Pike Series are mini-albums that Buckethead began releasing rapidly in 2011, usually around 30 minutes in length. Each has a sequential number like a comic book. Live Pikes are listed separately under Live albums. Several Pike albums are unreleased (286, 289, 290, 295, 513, 525); preview tracks from Pikes 286 Nautical Twilight, 289, and 290 are available online. All Pikes are released using the "Bucketheadland" label. Buckethead has released 810 pike albums.

Year	Pike No.	Album Name	Length	Released	Format
2011	1	It's Alive	31:10	May 15	CD
2011	2	Empty Space	32:00	May 20 (Tour Only Release: July 8) (Worldwide: July 14)	CD
2011	3	3 Foot Clearance	40:22	August 17	CD
2011	4	Underground Chamber	30:43	August 17	CD
2011	5	Look up There	32:29	August 17	CD
2012	6	Balloon Cement	30:05	April 14 (CD: May 17)	CD
2012	7	The Shores of Molokai	31:34	August 9 (CD: August 25)	Digital/CD
2012	8	Racks	29:52	September 20	Digital/CD
2012	9	March of the Slunks	30:36	September 20	Digital/CD
2012	10	The Silent Picture Book	29:47	September 20	Digital/CD
2013	11	Forgotten Library	31:26	April 9 (Regular: June 4)	Digital/CD
2013	12	Propellar	30:17	May 7	CD
2013	13	Pike 13	33:14	May 13	CD
2013	14	The Mark of Davis	31:49	May 31	CD
2013	15	View Master	30:05	June 8 (limited), March 31, 2016 (digital)	CD
2013	16	The Boiling Pond	30:05	June 21	CD
2013	17	The Spirit Winds	30:51	July 2	CD
2013	18	The Astrodome	33:28	July 29 (limited), March 31, 2016 (digital)	CD
2013	19	Teeter Slaughter	31:38	August 5	CD
2013	20	Thaw	32:21	August 5	CD
2013	21	Spiral Trackway	31:06	September 3 (download), August 10, 2020 (remix)	CD
2013	22	Sphere Facade	31:44	September 3 (download), August 10, 2020 (remix)	CD
2013	23	Telescape	32:14	August 16 (digital)	Digital/CD
2013	24	Slug Cartilage	30:55	September 4 (digital)	Digital/CD
2013	25	Pancake Heater	31:23	September 5 (digital)	Digital/CD
2013	26	Worms for the Garden	30:07	September 13 (digital)	Digital/CD
2013	27	Halls of Dimension	32:03	September 18 (digital)	Digital/CD
2013	28	Feathers	31:39	October 3 (digital)	Digital/CD
2013	29	Splatters	31:02	September 26 (digital)	Digital/CD
2013	30	Mannequin Cemetery	29:13	October 5 (digital)	Digital/CD
2013	31	Pearson's Square	33:40	October 24 (digital)	Digital/CD
2013	32	Rise of the Blue Lotus	29:35	November 8 (digital)	Digital/CD
2013	33	Pumpkin	31:10	October 29 (digital)	Digital/CD
2013	34	Pikes	32:49	November 27 (digital)	Digital/CD
2013	35	Thank You Ohlinger's	32:06	November 2 (digital)	Digital/CD
2013	36	The Pit	28:26	November 2 (digital)	Digital/CD
2013	37	Hollowed Out	32:10	November 11 (digital)	Digital/CD
2013	38	It Smells Like Frogs	31:08	November 22 (digital)	Digital/CD
2013	39	Twisterlend	30:36	November 25 (digital)	Digital/CD
2013	40	Coat of Charms	29:38	December 11 (digital)	Digital/CD
2013	41	Wishes	33:05	December 24 (digital)	Digital/CD
2014	42	Backwards Chimney	29:02	January 18 (limited)	Digital/CD
2014	43	Pike 43	33:05	January 21 (limited)	Digital/CD
2014	44	You Can't Triple Stamp a Double Stamp	29:44	January 9 (digital)	Digital/CD
2014	45	The Coats of Claude	29:59	January 17 (digital)	Digital/CD
2014	46	Rainy Days	31:07	March 1 (digital)	Digital/CD
2014	47	Roller Coaster Track Repair	30:06	March 1 (digital), February 2018 (vinyl)	Digital/CD/LP/VHS
2014	48	Hide in the Pickling Jar	30:52	February 7 (digital)	Digital/CD
2014	49	Monument Valley	29:32	February 7 (digital)	Digital/CD
2014	50	Pitch Dark	29:58	February 25 (digital)	Digital/CD
2014	51	Claymation Courtyard	30:23	April 14 (physical)	Digital/CD
2014	52	Factory	29:45	March 13 (digital)	Digital/CD
2014	53	City of Ferris Wheels	31:30	March 23 (digital)	Digital/CD
2014	54	The Frankensteins Monsters Blinds	30:39	March 27 (digital)	Digital/CD
2014	55	The Miskatonic Scale	29:39	May 23 (digital)	Digital/CD
2014	56	Cycle	30:29	April 17 (digital)	Digital/CD
2014	57	Night Gallery	30:11	April 28 (digital)	Digital/CD
2014	58	Outpost	29:00	April 30 (digital)	Digital/CD
2014	59	Ydrapoej	29:18	June 23 (limited), July 10 (digital)	Digital/CD
2014	60	Footsteps	29:15	May 13 (digital)	Digital/CD
2014	61	Citacis	29:10	May 20 (digital)	Digital/CD
2014	62	Outlined for Citacis	29:56	May 28 (digital)	Digital/CD
2014	63	Grand Gallery	29:43	May 28 (digital)	Digital/CD
2014	64	Aquarium	29:08	July 16 (limited), July 21 (digital)	Digital/CD
2014	65	Hold Me Forever (In Memory of my Mom, Nancy York Carroll)	28:37	June 25 (digital)	Digital/CD
2014	66	Leave the Light On	30:44	July 29 (limited), August 14 (digital)	Digital/CD
2014	67	Abandoned Slaughterhouse	30:06	July 13 (digital)	Digital/CD
2014	68	Assignment 033-03	29:04	July 18 (digital)	Digital/CD
2014	69	Category of Whereness	29:27	August 26 (limited), March 31, 2016 (digital)	Digital/CD
2014	70	Snow Slug	29:21	July 29 (digital)	Digital/CD
2014	71	Celery	29:03	August 5 (digital)	Digital/CD
2014	72	Closed Attractions	31:19	August 13 (digital)	Digital/CD
2014	73	Final Bend of the Labyrinth	30:36	August 21 (digital)	Digital/CD
2014	74	Infinity Hill	29:21	August 21 (digital)	Digital/CD
2014	75	Twilight Constrictor	30:15	August 28 (digital)	Digital/CD
2014	76	Caterpillar	30:09	September 19 (limited), March 31, 2016 (digital)	Digital/CD
2014	77	Bumbyride Dreamlands	28:34	September 4 (download)	Digital/CD
2014	78	Pike 78	30:41	September 23 (limited)	Digital/CD
2014	79	Geppetos Trunk	29:32	September 14 (download)	Digital/CD
2014	80	Cutout Animatronic	28:03	September 17 (limited)	Digital/CD
2014	81	Carnival of Cartilage	29:01	September 27 (download)	Digital/CD
2014	82	Calamity Cabin	29:54	September 27 (download)	Digital/CD
2014	83	Dreamless Slumber	29:00	October 3 (download)	Digital/CD
2014	84	Whirlpool	28:54	October 7 (download)	Digital/CD
2014	85	Walk in Loset	29:17	October 11 (download)	Digital/CD
2014	86	Our Selves	28:38	October 18 (download)	Digital/CD
2014	87	Interstellar Slunk	30:52	October 20 (download)	Digital/CD
2014	88	Red Pepper Restaurant	33:21	October 24 (download)	Digital/CD
2014	89	The Time Travelers Dream	30:19	October 28 (download)	Digital/CD
2014	90	Listen for the Whisper	29:03	October 30 (download)	Digital/CD
2014	91	Sublunar	29:13	December 9 (limited), March 31, 2016 (digital)	Digital/CD
2014	92	The Splatterhorn	30:16	November 15 (download)	Digital/CD
2014	93	Coaster Coat	32:46	November 20 (download)	Digital/CD
2014	94	Magic Lantern	29:27	November 26 (download)	Digital/CD
2014	95	Northern Lights	28:43	November 28 (download)	Digital/CD
2014	96	Yarn	30:18	December 4 (download)	Digital/CD
2014	97	Passageways	29:05	December 11 (download)	Digital/CD
2014	98	Pilot	29:20	December 19 (download)	Digital/CD
2014	99	Polar Trench	30:40	December 25 (download)	Digital/CD
2014	100	The Mighty Microscope	29:59	December 30 (download)	Digital/CD
2014	101	In the Hollow Hills	29:04	December 31 (download)	Digital/CD
2015	102	Sideway Streets	29:28	January 13 (download)	Digital/CD
2015	103	Squid Ink Lodge	30:15	January 21 (download)	Digital/CD
2015	104	Project Little Man	29:02	February 27 (download)	Digital/CD
2015	105	The Moltrail	30:11	January 27 (download)	Digital/CD
2015	106	Forest of Bamboo	29:12	January 29 (download)	Digital/CD
2015	107	Weird Glows Gleam	28:59	January 30 (download)	Digital/CD
2015	108	Collect Itself	29:09	January 30 (download)	Digital/CD
2015	109	The Left Panel	29:56	February 3 (download)	Digital/CD
2015	110	Wall to Wall Cobwebs	32:04	February 14 (download)	Digital/CD
2015	111	Night of the Snowmole	28:56	February 17 (download)	Digital/CD
2015	112	Creaky Doors and Creaky Floors	29:16	February 19 (download)	Digital/CD
2015	113	Herbie Theatre	30:40	February 21 (download)	Digital/CD
2015	114	Glow in the Dark	29:15	February 24 (download)	Digital/CD
2015	115	Marble Monsters	30:29	February 27 (download)	Digital/CD
2015	116	Infinity of the Spheres	29:10	February 27 (download)	Digital/CD
2015	117	Vacuum	30:16	February 28 (download)	Digital/CD
2015	118	Elevator	29:28	March 11 (download)	Digital/CD
2015	119	Solar Sailcraft	30:09	May 9 (download)	Digital/CD
2015	120	Louzenger	31:16	March 19 (download)	Digital/CD
2015	121	Shaded Ray	30:01	March 21 (download)	Digital/CD
2015	122	The Other Side of the Dark	28:51	March 26 (download)	Digital/CD
2015	123	Scroll of Vegetable	28:33	March 28 (download)	Digital/CD
2015	124	Rotten Candy Cane	29:44	March 31 (download)	Digital/CD
2015	125	Along the River Bank	29:44	April 3 (download)	Digital/CD
2015	126	Tourist	29:55	April 9 (download)	Digital/CD
2015	127	Paint to the Tile	29:02	April 12 (download)	Digital/CD
2015	128	Tucked Into Dreams	30:07	April 19 (download)	Digital/CD
2015	129	Forever Lake	32:11	April 21 (download)	Digital/CD
2015	130	Down in the Bayou Part Two	29:51	April 24 (download)	Digital/CD
2015	131	Down the Bayou Part One	29:20	April 28 (download)	Digital/CD
2015	132	Chamber of Drawers	28:29	April 29 (download)	Digital/CD
2015	133	Embroidery	29:18	April 30 (download)	Digital/CD
2015	134	Digging Under the Basement	30:34	May 8 (download)	Digital/CD
2015	135	Haunted Roller Coaster Chair	30:02	May 8 (download)	Digital/CD
2015	136	Firebolt	28:39	May 9 (download)	Digital/CD
2015	137	Hideous Phantasm	30:01	May 16 (download)	Digital/CD
2015	138	Giant Claw	30:05	May 22 (download)	Digital/CD
2015	139	Observation	30:22	May 26 (download)	Digital/CD
2015	140	Hats and Glasses	32:18	May 30 (download)	Digital/CD
2015	141	Last Call for the E.P. Ripley	29:00	May 30 (download)	Digital/CD
2015	142	Nautical Nightmares	28:44	May 31 (download)	Digital/CD
2015	143	Blank Bot	29:51	June 5 (download)	Digital/CD
2015	144	Scream Sundae	29:56	June 6 (download)	Digital/CD
2015	145	Kareem's Footprint	28:38	June 9 (download)	Digital/CD
2015	146	Carrotcature	28:58	June 11 (download)	Digital/CD
2015	147	Popcorn Shells	28:42	June 13 (download)	Digital/CD
2015	148	Invisable Forest	29:17	June 17 (download)	Digital/CD
2015	149	Chickencoopscope	29:42	June 19 (download)	Digital/CD
2015	150	Heaven is your Home (For my Father, Thomas Manley Carroll)	30:00	June 21 (download – free download on Father's Day, 2015)	Digital/CD
2015	151	Fog Gardens	30:57	June 27 (download)	Digital/CD
2015	152	Carnival Cutouts	28:46	July 3 (download)	Digital/CD
2015	153	Whisper Track	31:51	July 8 (download)	Digital/CD
2015	154	The Cellar Yawns	30:52	July 13 (download)	Digital/CD
2015	155	Ancient Lens	28:33	July 16 (download)	Digital/CD
2015	156	Herbie Climbs a Tree	29:40	July 22 (download)	Digital/CD
2015	157	Upside Down Skyway	31:01	July 24 (download)	Digital/CD
2015	158	Twisted Branches	29:43	July 28 (download)	Digital/CD
2015	159	Half Circle Bridge	31:09	July 31 (download)	Digital/CD
2015	160	Land of Miniatures	29:00	August 1 (download)	Digital/CD
2015	161	Bats in the Lite Brite	31:43	August 1 (download)	Digital/CD
2015	162	Four Forms	34:47	August 8 (download)	Digital/CD
2015	163	Blue Tide	29:35	August 11 (download)	Digital/CD
2015	164	Ghoul	27:45	August 18 (download)	Digital/CD
2015	165	Orange Tree	27:47	August 21 (download)	Digital/CD
2015	166	Region	33:11	August 25 (download)	Digital/CD
2015	167	Shapeless	30:23	August 27 (download)	Digital/CD
2015	168	Ognarader	28:50	September 2 (download)	Digital/CD
2015	169	The Windowsill	30:24	September 6 (download)	Digital/CD
2015	170	Washed Away	29:48	September 12 (download)	Digital/CD
2015	171	A Ghost Took My Homework	29:56	September 17 (download)	Digital/CD
2015	172	Crest of the Hill	30:35	September 19 (download)	Digital/CD
2015	173	The Blob	28:43	September 24 (download)	Digital/CD
2015	174	Last House on Slunk Street	29:00	September 26 (download)	Digital/CD
2015	175	Quilted	29:28	September 29 (download)	Digital/CD
2015	176	31 Days Til Halloween: Visitor From the Mirror	29:38	October 1 (download)	Digital/CD
2015	177	30 Days Til Halloween: Swollen Glasses	30:56	October 2 (download)	Digital/CD
2015	178	29 Days Til Halloween: Blurmwood	29:11	October 3 (download)	Digital/CD
2015	179	28 Days Til Halloween: The Insides of the Outsides	30:42	October 4 (download)	Digital/CD
2015	180	27 Days Til Halloween: Cavern Guide	30:18	October 5 (download)	Digital/CD
2015	181	26 Days Til Halloween: Bogwitch	30:54	October 6 (download)	Digital/CD
2015	182	25 Days Til Halloween: Window Fragment	29:55	October 7 (download)	Digital/CD
2015	183	24 Days Til Halloween: Screaming Scalp	29:51	October 8 (download)	Digital/CD
2015	184	23 Days Til Halloween: Wax	30:19	October 9 (download)	Digital/CD
2015	185	22 Days Til Halloween: I Got This Costume From the Sears Catalog	30:06	October 10 (free download)	Digital/CD
2015	186	21 Days Til Halloween: Cement Decay	30:14	October 11 (download)	Digital/CD
2015	187	20 Days Til Halloween: Forgotten Experiment	29:47	October 12 (download)	Digital/CD
2015	188	19 Days Til Halloween: Light in Window	29:20	October 13 (download)	Digital/CD
2015	189	18 Days Til Halloween: Blue Squared	29:04	October 14 (download)	Digital/CD
2015	190	17 Days Til Halloween: 1079	30:16	October 15 (download)	Digital/CD
2015	191	16 Days Til Halloween: Cellar	30:03	October 16 (download)	Digital/CD
2015	192	15 Days Til Halloween: Grotesques	30:20	October 17 (download)	Digital/CD
2015	193	14 Days Til Halloween: Voice From the Dead Forest	29:52	October 18 (download)	Digital/CD
2015	194	13 Days Til Halloween: Maple Syrup	30:10	October 19 (download)	Digital/CD
2015	195	12 Days Til Halloween: Face Sling Shot	29:39	October 20 (download)	Digital/CD
2015	196	11 Days Til Halloween: Reflection	30:39	October 21 (download)	Digital/CD
2015	197	10 Days Til Halloween: Residue	29:02	October 22 (download)	Digital/CD
2015	198	9 Days Til Halloween: Eye on Spiral	28:26	October 23 (download)	Digital/CD
2015	199	8 Days Til Halloween: Flare Up	30:52	October 24 (download)	Digital/CD
2015	200	7 Days Til Halloween: Cavernous	30:31	October 25 (download)	Digital/CD
2015	201	6 Days Til Halloween: Underlair	30:17	October 26 (download)	Digital/CD
2015	202	5 Days Til Halloween: Scrapbook Front	30:29	October 27 (download)	Digital/CD
2015	203	4 Days Til Halloween: Silent Photo	29:19	October 28 (download)	Digital/CD
2015	204	3 Days Til Halloween: Crow Hedge	29:52	October 29 (download)	Digital/CD
2015	205	2 Days Til Halloween: Cold Frost	31:07	October 30 (download)	Digital/CD
2015	206	Happy Halloween: Silver Shamrock	30:32	October 31 (download)	Digital/CD
2015	207	365 Days Til Halloween: Smash	30:27	November 1 (download)	Digital/CD
2015	208	The Wishing Brook	29:50	November 2 (download)	Digital/CD
2015	209	Rooms of Illusions	29:14	November 4 (download)	Digital/CD
2015	210	Sunken Parlor	28:50	November 7 (download)	Digital/CD
2015	211	Screen Door	28:04	November 14 (download)	Digital/CD
2015	212	Hornet	28:15	November 16 (download)	Digital/CD
2015	213	Crumple	29:11	November 19 (download)	Digital/CD
2015	214	Trace Candle	28:14	November 25 (download)	Digital/CD
2015	215	Teflecter	29:06	December 2 (download)	Digital/CD
2015	216	Wheels of Ferris	30:01	December 8 (download)	Digital/CD
2015	217	Pike Doors	30:29	December 19 (download)	Digital/CD
2015	218	Old Toys	29:50	December 23 (download)	Digital/CD
2015	219	Rain Drops on Christmas	28:12	December 24 (download – free on Christmas Eve & Day)	Digital/CD
2016	220	Mirror Realms	29:09	January 6 (download)	Digital/CD
2016	221	Cove Cloud	28:48	January 11 (download)	Digital/CD
2016	222	Out of the Attic	28:37	January 15 (download)	Digital/CD
2016	223	Dragging the Fence	29:58	January 19 (download)	Digital/CD
2016	224	Buildor	28:31	January 23 (download)	Digital/CD
2016	225	Florrmat	29:00	January 26 (download)	Digital/CD
2016	226	Happy Birthday MJ 23	28:58	February 17 (download)	Digital/CD
2016	227	Arcade of the Deserted	29:34	February 20 (download)	Digital/CD
2016	228	The Creaking Stairs	29:09	February 24 (download)	Digital/CD
2016	229	Cabs	29:14	February 28 (download)	Digital/CD
2016	230	Rooftop	29:52	March 14 (download)	Digital/CD
2016	231	Drift	27:46	March 14 (download)	Digital/CD
2016	232	Lightboard	29:53	March 26 (download)	Digital/CD
2016	233	22222222	30:29	March 26 (download)	Digital/CD
2016	234	Coupon	29:48	March 30 (download)	Digital/CD
2016	235	Oneiric Pool	28:48	October 27 (download)	Digital/CD
2016	236	Castle on Slunk Hill	31:59	November 3 (download)	Digital/CD
2016	237	The Five Blocks	29:25	November 17 (download)	Digital/CD
2016	238	Attic Garden	30:20	November 21 (download)	Digital/CD
2016	239	The Mermaid Stairwell	28:25	November 25 (download)	Digital/CD
2016	240	Chart	28:27	December 1 (download)	Digital/CD
2016	241	Sparks in the Dark	28:50	December 9 (download) (Vinyl: December 2017)	Digital/CD
2016	242	Hamdens Hollow	30:06	December 12 (download)	Digital/CD
2016	243	Santa's Toy Workshop	31:23	December 23 (download)	Digital/CD
2017	244	Out Orbit	27:59	January 11 (download)	Digital/CD
2017	245	Space Viking	30:31	January 14 (download)	Digital/CD
2017	246	Nettle	28:23	January 20 (download)	Digital/CD
2017	247	Rivers in the Seas	31:22	January 29 (download)	Digital/CD
2017	248	Adrift in Sleepwakefulness	28:18	January 31 (download)	Digital/CD
2017	249	The Moss Lands	28:33	February 8 (download)	Digital/CD
2017	250	250	30:28	February 11 (download)	Digital/CD
2017	251	Waterfall Cove	28:53	February 17 (download)	Digital/CD
2017	252	Bozo in the Labyrinth	30:32	February 23 (download)	Digital/CD
2017	253	Coop Erstown	29:48	February 28 (download)	Digital/CD
2017	254	Woven Twigs	30:05	March 3 (download)	Digital/CD
2017	255	Abominable Snow Scalp	29:22	March 9 (download)	Digital/CD
2017	256	Meteor Firefly Net	29:43	March 17 (download)	Digital/CD
2017	257	Blank Slate	30:20	March 24 (download)	Digital/CD
2017	258	Echo	28:50	March 30 (download)	Digital/CD
2017	259	Undersea Dead City	28:27	April 1 (download)	Digital/CD
2017	260	Ferry to the Island of Lost Minds	28:04	April 7 (download)	Digital/CD
2017	261	Portal to the Red Waterfall	28:42	April 13 (download)	Digital/CD
2017	262	Nib Y Nool	29:20	April 15 (download)	Digital/CD
2017	263	Glacier	30:59	April 24 (download)	Digital/CD
2017	264	Poseidon	30:21	May 5 (download) (vinyl: January 2018)	Digital/CD/LP
2017	265	Ride Operator Q Bozo	31:25	June 6 (download)	Digital/CD
2017	266	Far	27:53	July 8 (download)	Digital/CD
2017	267	Thoracic Spine Collapser	29:36	July 15 (download)	Digital/CD
2017	268	Sonar Rainbow	29:35	July 20 (download)	Digital/CD
2017	269	Decaying Parchment	32:49	August 11 (download) (vinyl: December)	Digital/CD/LP
2017	270	A3	28:50	August 13 (download)	Digital/CD
2017	271	The Squaring of the Circle	29:25	August 25 (download)	
2017	272	Coniunctio	28:25	August 28 (download)	
2017	273	Guillotine Furnace	28:03	December 9 (download)	
2018	274	Fourneau Cosmique	28:06	February 22 (download)	
2018	275	Dreamthread	29:41	August 4 (download)	
2020	276	Healing Inside Outside Every Side	30:26	February 3 (limited), April 4 (download)	
2020	277	Division Is the Devil's Playground	30:08	February 3 (limited), August 23 (download)	
2020	278	Unexpected Journeys	28:07	February 21 (limited), July 30 (download)	
2020	279	Skeleton Keys	29:15	March 2 (limited), August 24 (download)	
2020	280	In Dreamland	29:38	March 16, November 13 (download)	
2020	281	The Sea Remembers Its Own	27:59	March 16, October 4 (download)	
2020	282	Toys R Us Tantrums	28:28	March 30, October 5 (download)	
2020	283	Once Upon a Distant Plane	31:11	September 10 (download)	
2020	284	Through the Looking Garden	30:24	November 28 (download)	
2021	285	The Stone of Folly	18:59	March 22 (download)	
2021	286	Nautical Twilight		(Pending Release)	
2021	287	Electrum	29:22	February 28 (download)	
2021	288	Liminal Monorail	27:31	February 28 (download)	
2021	289	Pike 289		(Pending Release)	
2021	290	Pike 290		(Pending Release)	
2021	291	Fogray	29:51	April 9 (download)	
2021	292	Galaxies	28:37	May 30 (download)	
2021	295	Pike 295		(Pending Release)	
2021	296	Ghouls of the Graves	29:31	October 21 (download)	
2021	297	Fork	30:02	November 3 (download)	
2021	298	Robes of Citrine	26:32	November 11 (download)	
2021	299	Thought Pond	28:40	November 27 (download)	
2021	300	Quarry	26:32	December 16 (download)	
2021	301	The Chariot of Saturn	27:39	December 18 (download)	
2021	302	Cyborgs Robots & More	29:07	December 31 (download)	
2022	303	Castle of Franken Berry	27:12	January 11 (download)	
2022	304	Rainbow Tower	27:24	January 20 (download)	
2022	305	Two Story Hourglass	28:07	January 27 (download)	
2022	306	The Toy Cupboard	27:08	January 29 (download)	
2022	307	Mercury Beak	27:33	April 5 (download)	
2022	308	Theatre of the Disembodied	27:41	April 9 (download)	
2022	309	Cosmic Oven	28:24	April 28 (download)	
2022	310	In the Laboratory of Doctor Septimus Pretorius	26:58	May 7 (download)	
2022	311	Furnace Follies	29:00	May 11 (download)	
2022	312	Gary Fukamoto My Childhood Best Friend Thanks for All the Times We Played Together	27:05	May 13 (download)	
2022	313	Vincent Price SHRUNKEN HEAD Apple Sculpture	25:09	May 20 (download)	
2022	314	Rooster Coaster	27:22	June 3 (download)	
2022	315	Arboretum	26:59	June 14 (download)	
2022	316	Angel Wings	26:59	June 18 (download)	
2022	318	March 19, 2020	27:00	June 24 (download)	
2022	319	Dreams Remembered	27:54	July 5 (download)	
2022	320	Dreams Remembered Version 2	28:03	July 7 (download)	
2022	321	Warm Your Ancestors	27:58	July 9 (download)	
2022	322	Doctor Lorca's Work	26:16	July 28 (download)	
2022	323	Thank You Taylor	28:08	August 16 (download)	
2022	325	Language of the Mosaics	26:45	September 2 (download)	
2022	395	Holding the Ones You Love	28:55	December 8 (download)	
2022	398	Dream Shores	29:59	December 9 (download)	
2022	399	Gloworms	30:38	December 9 (download)	
2022	400	Decorating	30:17	December 20 (download)	
2023	415	Sarahnade	30:59	January 6 (download)	
2023	415	Sarahnade No Drums	30:59	January 6 (download)	
2023	415	Sarahnade Version 2	30:59	January 6 (download)	
2023	416	That Overcast Day	30:29	January 6 (download)	
2023	420	Echoing Eyes	29:41	January 13 (download)	
2023	421	Streams	29:54	January 20 (download)	
2023	421	Streams No Drums	29:52	January 20 (download)	
2023	422	Waters of the Unconcious	30:18	January 20 (download)	
2023	423	Lantern of Wide Waters	29:56	February 3 (download)	
2023	424	Hourglass of Visions	30:27	February 4 (download)	
2023	425	Metamorphosis	29:25	February 10 (download)	
2023	426	Sideways Ocean Roller Coaster	18:37	February 10 (download)	
2023	427	The Waves Are Born	30:05	February 10 (download)	
2023	432	Sacred Lantern	30:26	February 10 (download)	
2023	433	Mercury Hallucinations	30:12	February 10 (download)	
2023	450	Divine Spark	30:19	February 25 (download)	
2023	465	Rain Dear	14:34	March 8 (download)	
2023	466	Bubbles of Mercury	30:26	March 8 (download)	
2023	467	Roller Coaster School	32:46	March 8 (download)	
2023	477	Dancing Soul	27:59	March 18 (download)	
2023	488	Lunar Tree (featuring Netlag)	37:22	March 28 (download)	
2023	489	The Winding of Tears (featuring Netlag)	28:09	March 28 (download)	
2023	490	Crossing the Cosmos (featuring Netlag)	32:35	March 30 (download)	
2023	495	Just Looking for a Friend	30:10	April 2 (download)	
2023	496	Smile That Glows the Sky’s Pavillion	30:29	April 5 (download)	
2023	497	Maps to Innerworlds	24:18	April 5 (download)	
2023	498	Medicine Sea	29:43	April 5 (download)	
2023	499	The Attic That Dripped Blood	30:00	April 5 (download)	
2023	500	500 Alchemical Experiments	34:16	April 5 (download)	
2023	501	Inner Rainbows	30:27	April 22 (download)	
2023	502	Jeweled Web	29:28	April 22 (download)	
2023	503	Of the Mountains and Seas	31:06	April 22 (download)	
2023	504	Sky Writing	30:43	April 28 (download)	
2023	505	Dances of the Sacred	31:43	April 30 (download)	
2023	506	Inner Stream	28:51	May 4 (download)	
2023	507	Behind The Rain	30:25	May 4 (download)	
2023	508	May The 4th Be With You	25:28	May 4 (download)	
2023	509	Someday	32:42	May 5 (download)	
2023	510	Smelting of Ores	30:12	May 5 (download)	
2023	511	Yellowcrest	28:11	May 5 (download)	
2023	512	Neuro Transmitter	30:51	May 5 (download)	
2023	514	Arrival in Tokyo	30:49	May 17 (download)	
2023	515	Turquoise Trail	30:30	May 17 (download)	
2023	516	Whale Song	28:18	May 17 (download)	
2023	517	The Tear That Held an Ocean	29:05	June 1 (download)	
2023	518	Mirror Streams	28:36	June 1 (download)	
2023	519	Inside	29:43	June 1 (download)	
2023	520	Droid Decal	27:09	June 1 (download)	
2023	521	Passage	25:04	June 6 (download)	
2023	522	Abyss Furnace	31:17	June 6 (download)	
2023	523	Sparkling Stream	29:32	June 6 (download)	
2023	524	Humbug	32:05	June 6 (download)	
2023	526	Frequencies of Caring	31:12	June 9 (download)	
2023	527	Stairways of Planets	26:57	June 9 (download)	
2023	528	A Moment to Hold	27:26	June 14 (download)	
2023	529	Carriage	29:39	June 14 (download)	
2023	530	Rainbow Fountain	29:34	June 14 (download)	
2023	531	The Enigma of the Chariot	30:57	June 29 (download)	
2023	532	Held Reflection	31:11	June 30 (download)	
2023	533	Many Moons Ago and Now	28:32	June 30 (download)	
2023	534	The Coloring of Metals	29:49	June 30 (download)	
2023	535	Storm and Stillness	27:51	June 30 (download)	
2023	536	Where the Gentle Breeze Plays	28:57	June 30 (download)	
2023	537	Dream Meadow	30:57	July 12 (download)	
2023	538	Wellspring	27:22	July 13 (download)	
2023	539	Treehouse Backwards in Time	30:26	July 14 (download)	
2023	540	Communicating Through the Stars	35:01	July 14 (download)	
2023	541	In the Sky	28:58	July 14 (download)	
2023	542	Lanterns of Nara	28:59	July 14 (download)	
2023	543	The Mystery of Patience Worth	30:48	July 28 (download)	
2023	544	Nature Reflects	27:31	August 1 (download)	
2023	545	Kicking to the Moon	27:02	August 1 (download)	
2023	546	Spirals of the Unconscious	33:47	August 1 (download)	
2023	547	Divine	34:25	August 1 (download)	
2023	548	Anchor in the Storm	28:40	August 2 (download)	
2023	549	Water Altar	29:42	August 4 (download)	
2023	550	Where Ghosts Vanish Like Mists	30:43	August 4 (download)	
2023	551	Sparks Take Flight	28:42	August 4 (download)	
2023	552	The Philosopher's Water is Fire	29:38	August 4 (download)	
2023	553	Fountain Pen Fun	30:00	August 4 (download)	
2023	554	Mask of Warka	27:16	August 4 (download)	
2023	555	Echoes in the Mountain	32:49	August 4 (download)	
2023	556	Sacred Well	29:07	August 4 (download)	
2023	557	Mercury Alive	29:35	August 4 (download)	
2023	558	Waves on the Sand	27:21	August 4 (download)	
2023	559	Voices from the Abyss	30:48	August 10 (download)	
2023	560	Emeryville Mudflats	32:42	August 10 (download)	
2023	561	Moon Water	30:45	August 10 (download)	
2023	562	Blue Dunes	28:33	August 12 (download)	
2023	563	Journaling to Bliss	27:14	August 12 (download)	
2023	564	Figures Against the Sky	29:07	August 16 (download)	
2023	565	Open Air Museum	26:11	August 16 (download)	
2023	566	Sculptures by the Bay	28:18	August 17 (download)	
2023	567	Tower of Gratitude	28:36	August 17 (download)	
2023	568	Millwind	30:43	August 17 (download)	
2023	569	Stirring the Imaginations	30:01	August 17 (download)	
2023	570	Sculpture Spirits Remain	32:34	August 18 (download)	
2023	591	Sprinkle Tree Glow	26:19	October 20 (download)	
2023	592	Rays of the Magic Lantern	27:09	October 31 (download)	
2023	599	Can a Tree Feel Pain	29:19	December 8 (download)	
2023	600	The Gray Wind of Autumn	28:31		
2023	601	The Disembodied and Embodied at the Same Time Cafe	29:26		
2023	602	Living Lava	27:49		
2023	603	That Which Enchants Will Protect	28:10		
2023	604	Feeling the Sadness of What Holds One Back	28:57		
2023	605	Holiday Lights	26:59	December 13 (download)	
2023	606	Stranger in a Strange Land	32:33	December 23 (download)	
2023	607	Shores of the Subconcious	29:00	December 26 (download)	
2023	608	Sky Bridge	29:31	December 27 (download)	
2023	609	Book of Wonders	29:29		
2023	610	Lunar Realms	28:25		
2023	611	Underwater Observatory	28:40		
2023	612	Of the Rays	29:06		
2023	613	The Universe is Your Friend	27:33	December 28 (download)	
2023	614	Keeper of Solitude	28:29		
2023	615	Metals Grow	28:26		
2023	616	Blossoming of Dreams	28:52		
2023	617	Flow Freely	27:33	December 29 (download)	
2024	618	Fly on the Wings of a Flame	27:36	January 4 (download)	
2024	619	Deep Quiet	29:33		
2024	620	Stairway to the Gramaphone Company	28:12		
2024	621	Lab Notes	30:59		
2024	622	Free the Spark of Light	26:35	January 6 (download)	
2024	623	Seeing the Sea Sideways	27:19		
2024	624	Architect of the Inner Garden	29:11		
2024	625	Dissolve Ego	28:35		
2024	626	Sea of the Subconcious	28:28		
2024	627	Quieting the Thoughts that Don't Serve	26:43		
2024	628	Echo Canyon	26:23		
2024	629	The Waters	28:05		
2024	630	Home in the Sky	27:52		
2024	631	Fugien Vibes	29:54		
2024	632	In Solitude Roam	27:26	January 27 (download)	
2024	633	Through the Words Were Soft Whispers	29:04		
2024	634	Sea Above the Sky	27:23		
2024	635	Atlantis	27:38	January 31 (download)	
2024	636	Joy in the Little Things	18:31		
2024	637	Swirling Hexagon	26:24		
2024	638	Molded by the Wheel (featuring Netlag)	27:17		
2024	639	Light Ships	28:40		
2024	640	Journey to Atlantis	26:40		
2024	641	Rooster Eats its Beak to Tame Itself	29:06	February 2 (download)	
2024	642	Shell Caster	17:40	February 23 (download)	
2024	643	Sparkling of Sand	17:30	February 23 (download)	
2024	644	The Watery Realms	21:37	February 23 (download)	
2024	645	Angels Awaken a Slumbering Alchemist	20:14	February 28 (download)	
2024	646	Through the Veil of a Dream	16:44	February 28 (download)	
2024	647	Schlavender Schlingschlot Schleven Schlimes	20:04	February 28 (download)	
2024	648	Skywatching	19:49	March 1 (download)	
2024	649	River in the Sky	18:47	March 1 (download)	
2024	650	Sea Serpent	18:06	March 1 (download)	
2024	651	Mists of Preantiquity	18:40	March 1 (download)	
2024	652	Polaris	16:55	March 1 (download)	
2024	653	Open Dream Doorways	18:46	March 9 (download)	
2024	654	The Wonders of Rain	18:29	March 9 (download)	
2024	655	Echoes of Wings	17:46	March 10 (download)	
2024	656	Corridors of Tears	19:46	March 27 (download)	
2024	657	Stairway of Marble	19:39	March 29 (download)	
2024	658	The Fire of Red Sand	18:24	March 29 (download)	
2024	659	Days Across the Plains	20:16	March 29 (download)	
2024	660	Unity	18:38	April 2 (download)	
2024	661	Watching the Rain through the Stained Glass	18:26	July 16 (download)	
2024	662	Miracles are Supposed to Happen	20:28	July 16 (download)	
2025	663	Open Yourself to Wonder	20:07	January 16 (download)	
2025	664	Crinkle Bag of Goodies	17:51	January 25 (download)	
2025	665	Skyroom	18:34	February 3 (download)	
2025	666	Whispering Meadow	20:54	February 3 (download)	
2025	667	Hilltop Sanctuary	17:54	February 3 (download)	
2025	668	Whispering Well	18:36	February 3 (download)	
2025	669	The Mines of Sigismund Fugger	21:39	February 13 (download)	
2025	670	Signaling Across Time	18:18	February 13 (download)	
2025	671	When the Wind Blew through Your Branches	20:39	February 13 (download)	
2025	672	Cloaked in Wonder	21:42	June 26 (download)	
2025	673	The Glow of the Cave Gave Them Their Light	20:41	July 1 (download)	
2025	674	Seekers are Never Lost	18:37	July 1 (download)	
2025	675	The Tin Plague	21:25	August 20 (download)	
2025	676	Mountain Gate	24:45	August 21 (download)	
2025	677	Twisted in Cosmos Cries	18:09	August 29 (download)	
2025	679	Mist of the Waterfall	17:56	September 5 (download)	
2025	680	Ripley Scroll	17:17	September 9 (download)	
2025	681	The Hearing Forest	15:14	September 18 (download)	
2025	744	Mirror Face Counseling	21:12	December 14 (download)	
2025	745	Disembodied Mirrors : Cube 1	20:24	December 16 (download)	
2025	746	The Journey Has Many Steps	19:53	December 19 (download)	
2025	747	Dreams Are Never Lost	19:20	December 19 (download)	
2025	748	Dance in Waterfalls	19:09	December 20 (download)	
2025	749	Disembodied Mirrors : Cube 2 Once in the Vessel Always in the Vessel	19:51	December 20 (download)	
2025	750	Disembodied Mirrors : Cube 3	19:44	December 23 (download)	
2025	751	Disembodied Mirrors : Cube 4	19:43	December 23 (download)	
2025	752	Slow Motion Roller Coaster	19:20	December 23 (download)	
2025	753	Disembodied Mirrors : Cube 5	19:44	December 23 (download)	
2025	754	Disembodied Mirrors : Cube 6	19:39	December 23 (download)	
2025	755	Disembodied Mirrors : Cube 7	19:49	December 23 (download)	
2025	756	Velveteen Robot	19:31	December 23 (download)	
2025	758	Secret of the Mummy’s Tomb	19:53	December 24 (download)	
2025	759	Disembodied Mirrors : Cube 8	19:49	December 24 (download)	
2025	762	Unfolding In The Soul	19:42		
2025	763	Rich Innerworld Is Always Available	18:50	December 31 (download)	
2025	764	Gratefulness	19:21	December 31 (download)	
2025	765	The Tears That Become Teachers	20:03	December 31 (download)	
2026	766	The Dawn Mist	18:38	January 7 (download)	
2026	767	Sacred Lake	20:02	January 7 (download)	
2026	768	Backward Down the Stairway	19:02	January 7 (download)	
2026	769	Whispering Phantoms	19:34	January 7 (download)	
2026	770	Eyelids of Sunrise	16:30	January 7 (download)	
2026	772	Metal Looked Vessels	19:44	January 9 (download)	
2026	773	Disembodied Mirrors Action Figures on a Stick	22:07	January 9 (download)	
2026	774	Joyous Holidays Melancholy Holidays	19:34	January 9 (download)	
2026	796	Help In Producing Peacefull Individual Existence	21:42	March 5 (download)	
2026	797	Decaying	19:03	March 5 (download)	
2026	798	More Decaying	16:44	March 5 (download)	
2026	799	Echocoaster	18:32	March 5 (download)	
2026	800	Mirror Monoliths	20:44	March 5 (download)	
2026	801	Space Chalk	18:35	March 5 (download)	
2026	802	Full Color Iron-on Transfers	18:52	March 6 (download)	
2026	803	Sheets Of Mercury	18:08	March 10 (download)	
2026	804	Nix Olympica Station	18:55	March 10 (download)	
2026	805	Mirror Sea	20:51	March 11 (download)	
2026	806	Disembodied Heads	19:06	March 11 (download)	
2026	807	Fludds Memory Theatre	19:25	March 12 (download)	
2026	808	Mining The Mercury	16:06	March 12 (download)	
2026	809	Horseless Carriage	13:31	May 18 (download)	
2026	810	Always Searching Always Finding	20:44	July 1 (download)	
2026	811	Winding Paths	19:07	July 23 (download)	
2026	823	Lunar Lagoon	17:32	August 25 (download)	
2026	824	Labyrinth: Symbols in the Spiral 1	21:16	August 26 (download)	
2026	825	Labyrinth: Symbols in the Spiral 2	20:59	August 26 (download)	
2026	826	Labyrinth: Symbols in the Spiral 3	20:32	August 26 (download)	
2026	827	Labyrinth: Symbols in the Spiral 4	20:44	August 26 (download)	
2026	828	Labyrinth: Symbols in the Spiral 5	20:47	August 26 (download)	
2026	829	Labyrinth: Symbols in the Spiral 6	20:02	August 26 (download)	
2026	830	Labyrinth: Symbols in the Spiral 7	21:03	August 26 (download)	
2026	831	Labyrinth: Symbols in the Spiral 8	19:54	August 26 (download)	
2026	832	Labyrinth: Symbols in the Spiral 9	20:17	August 26 (download)	
2026	833	Labyrinth: Symbols in the Spiral 10	20:05	August 26 (download)	
2026	834	Labyrinth: Symbols in the Spiral 11	20:24	August 26 (download)	
2026	835	Labyrinth: Symbols in the Spiral 12	20:46	August 26 (download)	
2026	836	Labyrinth: Symbols in the Spiral 13	20:19	August 26 (download)	
2026	837	Labyrinth: Symbols in the Spiral 14	20:04	August 26 (download)	
2026	838	Labyrinth: Symbols in the Spiral 15	23:15	August 26 (download)	
2026	839	Labyrinth: Symbols in the Spiral 16	20:06	August 26 (download)	
2026	840	Labyrinth: Symbols in the Spiral 17	20:58	August 26 (download)	
2026	841	Labyrinth: Symbols in the Spiral 18	20:08	August 26 (download)	
2026	842	Labyrinth: Symbols in the Spiral 19	20:22	August 26 (download)	
2026	843	Labyrinth: Symbols in the Spiral 20	19:58	August 26 (download)	
2026	844	Labyrinth: Symbols in the Spiral 21	19:58	August 28 (download)	
2026	845	Labyrinth: Symbols in the Spiral 22	19:57	August 28 (download)	
2026	846	The Sky Sea	17:18	August 28 (download)	
2026	847	The Galaxys Veils	16:55	August 28 (download)	
2026	848	Willy Waxadermy And The Waxadermy Factory	16:38	September 23 (download)	
2026	849	Underwater Waxadermy Werks	17:06	September 23 (download)	
2026	850	Waxadermy Way	18:24	September 23 (download)	
2026	851	Robot Land Factories	20:07	September 29 (download)	
2026	852	Robot Land Storytime Theatre With Beak In The Belfry and Scissormitts	20:37	September 29 (download)	
2026	853	Robot Land Bionic Horror Scalp Horoscope	20:10	September 29 (download)	
2026	854	Robot Land Quicksand Adventure	21:01	September 29 (download)	
2026	855	Robot Land Cyborg Barbershop Trio	20:40	September 29 (download)	
2026	856	Mercury Extracter	20:18	September 29 (download)	
2026	857	Secret Lab	20:34	October 6 (download)	
2026	858	It Sprouts Arms It Flies	21:28	October 6 (download)	
2026	859	Incredible Melting Masks: First Mask	16:21	October 7 (download)	
2026	860	Incredible Melting Masks: Second Mask	19:47	October 7 (download)	
2026	861	Incredible Melting Masks: Third Mask	20:20	October 7 (download)	
2026	862	Incredible Melting Masks: Fourth Mask	20:33	October 7 (download)	
2026	863	Incredible Melting Masks: Fifth Mask	20:37	October 7 (download)	
2026	864	Incredible Melting Masks: Sixth Mask	21:21	October 7 (download)	
2026	865	Incredible Melting Masks: Seventh Mask	19:24	October 7 (download)	
2026	866	Incredible Melting Masks: Eighth Mask	20:04	October 7 (download)	
2026	867	Charlie Frown And The Great Halloween Meltdown	20:54	October 7 (download)	
2026	868	You Can Take The Pumpkin Out Of The Patch But You Can’t Take The Patch Out Of The Pumpkin Never Let Your Dreams Dim	23:13	October 23 (download)	
2026	869	Swamp Pumpkins	20:52	October 23 (download)	
2026	870	Pumpkin Balloon	17:48	October 23 (download)	
2026	871	Island of Ore	20:38	October 23 (download)	
2026	872	Disembodied Mines Extracting The Ores	20:39	October 23 (download)	
2026	873	Mining For Disembodied Sounds	20:36	October 23 (download)	
2026	874	His Mother Was Lightning	20:37	October 24 (download)	
2026	875	Lullabies From The Mist	16:28	October 28 (download)	
2026	876	Mannequins Under The Basement	20:06	October 28 (download)	
2026	877	Scarecrow Marsh	20:22	October 29 (download)	
2026	878	Headless Ventriloquist	22:07	October 29 (download)	
2026	879	Waxadermy Scarecrow	21:47	October 29 (download)	
2026	880	Scarecrow Castle	20:07	October 29 (download)	
2026	881	Do Scarecrows Dream of Electric Hay	20:30	October 29 (download)	
2026	882	Librarian 1: Section Neptune	22:17	October 30 (download)	
2026	883	Librarian 2: Section Antique Toy Collecting	22:17	October 30 (download)	
2026	884	Librarian 3: Section Mercurial Hallucinations	20:01	October 30 (download)	
2026	885	Librarian 4: Section Halloween History	20:27	October 30 (download)	
2026	886	Librarian 5: Section Amusement Park Construction	19:23	October 30 (download)	
2026	887	Halloween Residue Volume 1	22:18	November 3 (download)	
2026	888	Halloween Residue Volume 2	20:04	November 3 (download)	
2026	889	Halloween Residue Volume 3	20:43	November 3 (download)	
2026	890	Halloween Residue Volume 4	20:01	November 3 (download)	
2026	891	Halloween Residue Volume 5	20:38	November 3 (download)	
2026	892	Halloween Residue Volume 6	20:44	November 3 (download)	
2026	893	Halloween Residue Volume 7	20:11	November 3 (download)	
2026	894	Halloween Residue Volume 8	19:09	November 3 (download)	
2026	895	Halloween Residue Volume 9	20:30	November 3 (download)	
2026	896	Halloween Residue Volume 10	20:06	November 3 (download)	
2026	897	Halloween Residue Volume 11	20:01	November 3 (download)	

=== Special releases ===
Year	Album details
2007	In Search of The: Released: February 21, 2007; Label: TDRS; Format: 13CD-R; Length: 9:27:37
2007	Acoustic Shards: Released: May 31, 2007; Label: Avabella (CD-320); Format: CD; Length: 52:01
2007	Bucketheadland Blueprints (Re-release): Released: August, 2007; Label: TDRS; Format: CD; Length: 60:13
2008	From the Coop: Released: March 9, 2008; Label: Avabella (CD-321); Format: CD; Length: 43:15
2018	31 Days of Halloween The Silver Shamrock Series: Released: January 2018; Label: Bucketheadland; Format: Custom memory stick, download; Length: Pikes 176-206

=== EPs ===
Year	Album details
2001	KFC Skin Piles: Released: 2001; Label: Gonerville (BHB-001); Format: LP; Length: 23:44
2021	Jamoutz: Released: July 15, 2021; Label: Bucketheadland; Format: Digital; Length: 25:15

=== Live albums ===
Year	Pike	Album	Length	Released	Format
2018		Live in Bucketheadland	44:07	January	LP, DVD, CD, Digital
2021	293	Oven Mitts	28:05	July 9	Digital
2021	294	Warp Threads	27:52	July 11	Digital
2022	317	Live Feathers	28:51	June 21	Digital
2022	324	Live Sprinkles	50:28	August 27	Digital
2022	326	Live from the Boombox	28:48	September 3	Digital
2022	327	Carnival of Chicken Wire	28:41	September 3	Digital
2022	328	Live Hexagonal Poultry	30:44	September 15	Digital
2022	329	Chicken Ornaments	27:17	September 15	Digital
2022	330	Live Laboratory	29:47	September 17	Digital
2022	331	Live Vessel	34:14	September 19	Digital
2022	332	Live Interior	29:55	September 23	Digital
2022	333	Live Only in a Very General Way	32:55	September 24	Digital
2022	334	Live Alembic	28:33	September 25	Digital
2022	335	Live Torment of The Metals	30:46	September 25	Digital
2022	336	Live Chicken Weathervane	28:18	September 26	Digital
2022	337	Live Rooster cuckoo	26:02	September 26	Digital
2022	338	Live Balneum Marie	30:27	September 27	Digital
2022	339	Live Worm Fiend	27:48	September 29	Digital
2022	340	Live Pumpkins	30:18	September 30	Digital
2022	341	Live Rather Have a Frontal Lobotomy Than a Bottle in Front of Me	31:48	October 2	Digital
2022	342	Live Pumpkin Carving	39:47	October 2	Digital
2022	343	Live the Yellow Cape	30:15	October 4	Digital
2022	344	Live Excusez-moi	29:15	October 4	Digital
2022	345	Live Threshold: Echoes in Vessels	36:07	October 5	Digital
2022	346	Live Wax Museum Woodcuts	31:41	October 6	Digital
2022	347	Live Lunar Metals	30:09	October 8	Digital
2022	348	Live Entrance	33:11	October 9	Digital
2022	349	Live Rays of Mercury	32:31	October 11	Digital
2022	350	Live Submerged	31:05	October 16	Digital
2022	351	Live Bucketheadland is Pleased to Announce the Hiring of Jelly Jones for Future Ride Narrations	30:03	October 18	Digital
2022	352	Live Chymic Choir	32:05	October 19	Digital
2022	353	Live from Transylvania at the Baron von Embalmer Castle	29:11	October 20	Digital
2022	354	Live at the Rainbow Waterfalls Pavilion	32:27	October 22	Digital
2022	355	Live at Hieronymus Bosch Gardens	29:44	October 23	Digital
2022	356	Live Helium Bridge	30:45	October 23	Digital
2022	357	Live the Time Twisted Tree	32:33	October 25	Digital
2022	358	Live Hollow Harbor I'd Like a Dinghy if You Please	30:12	October 28	Digital
2022	359	Live Volcanic Soil	32:05	October 28	Digital
2022	360	Live from Octagonal Fountains	32:44	October 28	Digital
2022	361	Live Now Open Jello Guillotine	31:10	October 28	Digital
2022	362	Live Mining for the Disembodied	31:23	October 29	Digital
2022	363	Live from the Lord Summerisle Residence	28:49	October 29	Digital
2022	364	Live Bread Coffin	31:31	October 30	Digital
2022	365	Live Pumpkin Ghosts	29:45	October 31	Digital
2022	366	Live Web of Nature	29:21	November 1	Digital
2022	367	Live Offerings	29:34	November 3	Digital
2022	368	Live Coupledifferentvibes	35:14	November 3	Digital
2022	369	Live Subconscious Theme Park	29:42	November 4	Digital
2022	370	Live Alloy Mill	30:15	November 7	Digital
2022	371	Live Bare Skeleton	32:56	November 7	Digital
2022	372	Live Ocean Floor	31:55	November 7	Digital
2022	373	Live Chlorophyll Maze	31:30	November 9	Digital
2022	374	Live Apply the Bellows	32:32	November 10	Digital
2022	375	Live 10,000 Foot Balloons	31:51	November 10	Digital
2022	376	Live from the Wicker Effigy	31:54	November 11	Digital
2022	377	Live from the Cuckoo Twins Estate Private Party	31:46	November 16	Digital
2022	378	Live from Graveyard Guards M.T. Tombs	32:01	November 16	Digital
2022	379	Live Upon the Beam of Andromeda	32:27	November 19	Digital
2022	380	Live Nebula Crown	30:10	November 19	Digital
2022	381	Live Incarnations	32:32	November 20	Digital
2022	382	Live Air Thresholds	30:50	November 20	Digital
2022	383	Live Bateman Ax Moonwalk with a 9:00 Res at Dorsia	28:36	November 30	Digital
2022	384	Live Astral Ocean	31:16	December 2	Digital
2022	385	Live Pale Nimbus	32:32	December 2	Digital
2022	386	Live the Fish and Goose Soiree	31:26	December 3	Digital
2022	387	Live from the Colorado Lounge	30:33	December 4	Digital
2022	388	Live the Gold Room with Late Set at the Hedge Maze	30:39	December 4	Digital
2022	389	Live Impaled on the Strings	29:10	December 6	Digital
2022	390	Live from the New Granada Rec Center	29:46	December 6	Digital
2022	391	Live the Invisible Mirror	28:51	December 6	Digital
2022	392	Live from the Inner Laboratory	30:19	December 6	Digital
2022	393	Live from Haddonfield Street Fair	30:50	December 7	Digital
2022	394	Live from the Silver Shamrock Mask Factory	32:37	December 7	Digital
2022	396	Live Gruesome Skull Cup	32:32	December 9	Digital
2022	397	Live SSHHHRRREEIIKK!!!	30:51	December 9	Digital
2022	401	Live from Tetsuo Torii's Workshop	30:52	December 20	Digital
2022	402	Live from Lake Myojin	29:23	December 20	Digital
2022	403	Live from Dai Majin Mountain	29:56	December 20	Digital
2022	404	Live from Crimson Coaster	29:19	December 20	Digital
2022	405	Live from Void View	30:38	December 20	Digital
2022	406	Live from Jaw Drop	29:49	December 20	Digital
2023	407	Live Midnight at the Wax Museum	28:02	January 3	Digital
2023	408	Live Watch Your Head as You Attach It	29:32	January 3	Digital
2023	409	Live Ooze Your Orbs	29:24	January 3	Digital
2023	410	Live XII Yards of Rotting Gauze Coaster	30:19	January 3	Digital
2023	411	Live Last House on Disembodied Street	29:46	January 5	Digital
2023	412	Live Hand Painted Scotch Tape Mask Pavilion	30:31	January 5	Digital
2023	413	Live from Frankenstein's Lost Mine	30:47	January 5	Digital
2023	414	Live from Osaka Toy Store	30:15	January 5	Digital
2023	417	Live from the Forest of Melted Ice Cream	29:21	January 7	Digital
2023	418	Live from Candy Cane Catastrophe Coaster	31:43	January 7	Digital
2023	419	Live Disembodied Fountain	36:17	January 7	Digital
2023	428	Live from the Gargantua Volcano	32:19	February 10	Digital
2023	429	Live from Balloon Head Bowlery	31:40	February 10	Digital
2023	430	Live from the Giant Octopus	32:55	February 10	Digital
2023	431	Live from Lotus Island	29:31	February 10	Digital
2023		Live Show	65:29	February 11	Digital
2023	434	Live from Tsuburaya's	30:00	February 15	Digital
2023	435	Live from the Inner Alphabet	30:38	February 15	Digital
2023	436	Live from Greeting of a Lifetime	29:03	February 16	Digital
2023	437	Live from Stair Ladder Lane	30:13	February 17	Digital
2023	438	Live from Pythagoras Tone Coaster	29:20	February 21	Digital
2023	439	Live from Ichabod Disembodied	31:54	February 21	Digital
2023	440	Live from Crayon Cruise	29:03	February 21	Digital
2023	441	Live from Crayon Tron	33:33	February 21	Digital
2023	442	Live from Caves of Zero	33:18	February 23	Digital
2023	443	Live from Sarcophagus Slide	30:51	February 23	Digital
2023	444	Live from Kyoto Ghostlands	32:19	February 25	Digital
2023	445	Live from Lightning Disembodied	29:30	February 25	Digital
2023	446	Live from Bathed in Eerie Hues Light Show	29:14	February 25	Digital
2023	447	Live from the Disembodied Music Box	29:40	February 25	Digital
2023	448	Live from Ladder to the Cape of the Moon	28:56	February 25	Digital
2023	449	Live Mercury Spirals	33:43	February 25	Digital
2023	451	Live from the Nara Lightning Rain Festival	31:50	March 1	Digital
2023	452	Live from the Sea of the Wise Book Store	30:48	March 1	Digital
2023	453	Live from Head Basket Drop	30:33	March 1	Digital
2023	454	Live from Casket Automatons	29:21	March 1	Digital
2023	455	Live from Cutoff Head Basketball Tryouts	32:05	March 1	Digital
2023	456	Live from Magical Day Dreaming Workshop	30:41	March 1	Digital
2023	457	Live Mono Chord of the Disembodied	30:00	March 1	Digital
2023	458	Live from Arms and Legs Island	29:34	March 1	Digital
2023	459	Live from the Wonder Fountains	29:19	March 3	Digital
2023	460	Live Submarine Seance	29:38	March 3	Digital
2023	461	Live Slunking in the Rain	28:02	March 3	Digital
2023	462	Live Disembodied Sing Along	28:56	March 3	Digital
2023	463	Live from the Ceiling Marionete Festival	29:16	March 3	Digital
2023	464	Live Geometry Dreaming	31:56	March 3	Digital
2023	468	Live from J Skys Tarot Cafe	30:56	March 8	Digital
2023	469	Live Auditive Mirror Land	30:48	March 8	Digital
2023	470	Live from Abandon Animitronic Where House	29:15	March 8	Digital
2023	471	Live from the Parallel Bridge	30:02	March 8	Digital
2023	472	Live from Nunchuku Emporium East	32:17	March 8	Digital
2023	473	Live from Nunchuku Emporium West	30:36	March 8	Digital
2023	474	Live from the Distillation Train	32:37	March 8	Digital
2023	475	Live from Hand of Hades Roller Coaster	31:33	March 14	Digital
2023	476	Live from Showsides Disembodium	29:40	March 14	Digital
2023	478	Live Jump over the Disembodied Faces	32:02	March 18	Digital
2023	479	Live from Disembodied Half Pipe	30:14	March 18	Digital
2023	480	Live from Dessert Shack Skeleton Sundaes	30:01	March 24	Digital
2023	481	Live from Madusa's Mirror	30:32	March 24	Digital
2023	482	Live from Ectoplasm Theatre	32:12	March 24	Digital
2023	483	Live from Curiosity Corner	31:42	March 24	Digital
2023	484	Live 4 of 7 Metals Dream of Roller Coasters	29:40	March 24	Digital
2023	485	Live from Gliding the White Egg	31:49	March 24	Digital
2023	486	Live from Clown Cloud Projections Festival	32:15	March 24	Digital
2023	487	Live from X-ray Sideshow Mirroratorium	31:18	March 24	Digital
2023	491	Live from Madame Umbrella Fortune Teller	28:42	March 31	Digital
2023	492	Live from Sister Third Eye Guess Your MRI Tent	31:32	March 31	Digital
2023	493	Live from Bullhorn Story Time	29:19	March 31	Digital
2023	494	Live Rainbow Sherbert Vessel Cones	28:30	March 31	Digital
2023	571	Live from the Atrium of Vessels 1	31:12	August 31	Digital
2023	572	Live from the Atrium of Vessels 2	27:45	August 31	Digital
2023	573	Live from the Atrium of Vessels 3	28:58	August 31	Digital
2023	574	Live from the Atrium of Vessels 4	31:47	August 31	Digital
2023	575	Live from the Atrium of Vessels 5	29:46	August 31	Digital
2023	576	Live from the Atrium of Vessels 6	28:09	August 31	Digital
2023	577	Live from the Disembodied Cyclone	31:37	September 5	Digital
2023	578	Live from Marbles Museum	27:33	September 5	Digital
2023	579	Live from the Tron Marionettes Sea Shore	29:20	September 5	Digital
2023	580	Live from Patchwork Mansion	26:04	September 5	Digital
2023	581	Live from Stories of Vessels	29:48	September 5	Digital
2023	582	Live from Kairos Coaster	30:25	September 5	Digital
2023	583	Live from Marbles Railway	27:57	September 5	Digital
2023	584	Live from the Caringcells	28:34	September 7	Digital
2023	585	Live from the Caring Crane	30:36	September 7	Digital
2023	586	Live from Rainbow Dream Catcher	32:02	September 7	Digital
2023	587	Live from Slow Motion Speedway	29:06	September 7	Digital
2023	588	Live Ears Ringing	27:54	September 7	Digital
2023	589	Live from the Dance Hall of S. Mystica	29:42	September 7	Digital
2023	590	Live from Salt Air Bowling Vessels	27:53	September 7	Digital
2023	593	Live from the Athanor of the Second Sea	31:13	November 30	Digital
2023	594	Live Surrounded by Infinity Broadwalk	29:56	November 30	Digital
2023	595	Live Circles of the Sacred Mountain	26:37	November 30	Digital
2023	596	Live from the Dome Choir	29:10	December 7	Digital
2023	597	Live from the Cake Factory	30:56	December 7	Digital
2023	598	Live from the Blue Boats that Carry the Treeman	28:36	December 7	Digital
2025	682	Reverse	17:55	October 30	Digital
2025	683	Reverse #2	19:28	October 30	Digital
2025	684	Reverse #3	19:57	October 30	Digital
2025	685	Reverse #4	19:26	October 30	Digital
2025	686	Live from Squiggle Balance	19:41	November 4	Digital
2025	687	Build a Giant Ghoul: Live from the Grand Opening Party	22:28	November 4	Digital
2025	688	From Beyond Time the Vessels Sing Coffeetory 78th Year Anniversary Party	20:16	November 4	Digital
2025	689	Mouth of Madness Bungee Jump Live Afternoon Performance	21:18	November 4	Digital
2025	690	The Clouds Speak Thunders Sight Recorded During Rain Storm	20:43	November 4	Digital
2025	691	Live from Retrieve Disembodied Head Depot	21:18	November 4	Digital
2025	692	The Disembodied Two-Headed Mirror: Housing Heinrich's Amphitheatrum Sapientiae Aeternae Live after Refurbishing the Mirrors	24:12	November 4	Digital
2025	693	Live from Pumpkin Grounds Narrator Birthday	20:20	November 4	Digital
2025	694	Live from Presto Giant Ghoul Head Festival	19:06	November 4	Digital
2025	695	Live from Clown Cartilage Tavern Non Alcoholic Embalming Drinks	22:18	November 4	Digital
2025	696	Live from One-Head Double-Faces Fortune Teller: Ask One Question Get Two Answers, Ask Two Questions Get One Answer	18:58	November 4	Digital
2025	697	Live from Bridge to Lost Wonder Found	22:25	November 4	Digital
2025	698	Live from Disembodied Head Highway Inner Lantern Festival	20:06	November 4	Digital
2025	699	Live from Spider Jello Day	19:14	November 4	Digital
2025	700	Live from the Mercury Piano Lounge	21:58	November 4	Digital
2025	701	Live from the Land Where Flowers Can Grow Through Any Atmosphere	20:13	November 4	Digital
2025	702	Live from the Singing Decapitations Festival	24:36	November 25	Digital
2025	703	Open Scythe Mic Night	20:33	November 25	Digital
2025	704	Hieroglyphs in the Mercury Candy Shop	22:03	November 25	Digital
2025	705	Live from the Tokyo Robot and Toho Gift Emporium	20:02	November 25	Digital
2025	706	Live from the Wishing Window Open Every Day	18:52	November 25	Digital
2025	707	Live from the One Book One Skelton Head Book Store Opening Event	19:20	November 25	Digital
2025	708	Live from the Event Honoring the Wandering Popsicle Scalp Seller	18:52	November 25	Digital
2025	709	Live from the Opening of the New Bucketheadland Territory and Land Shrinking in a Mercurial Vacuum	19:35	November 25	Digital
2025	710	Disembodied Head Moving Practice Room	20:11	November 25	Digital
2025	711	A Show Honoring Marble Vendor Thank You for Being There Over and Over When Everyone Loses Their Marbles	19:40	November 25	
2025	712	Live from Forgotten Mariner Sea Food Shore	18:07	November 25	
2025	713	Live from the Library of Forgotten Scrolls	22:37	November 25	
2025	714	Live from Scalp S’Mores Bakery	18:59	November 25	
2025	715	Live from Keys of the Day Keys of the Night 24 Hour Event	1:07:05	November 26	
2025	716	Live from Sunwheel Saturdays	18:08	December 2	
2025	717	Live from Lord Lobster's Mansion	22:48	December 2	
2025	718	Visions of the Silver Mines Live	18:07	December 3	
2025	719	Abandoned Lands	21:02	December 3	
2025	720	Live from Enchanted Gardens	24:15	December 3	
2025	721	Live from Holiday Light Land Skyway	18:08	December 3	
2025	722	Live from Nice Dinosaur Pier	18:08	December 5	
2025	723	Live from Comedy Shack Coagulation	24:34	December 5	
2025	724	Live from the Stream That Passes Through the Valley of the Symbol Generator	23:13	December 5	
2025	725	Live from Hand Chandelier Carousel	18:06	December 5	
2025	726	Live from the Solar Light Parade	21:00	December 5	
2025	727	Live from Tree Regeneration Mountain	22:51	December 5	
2025	728	Live from Holiday Light Land Tree Decoration Ceremony	18:01	December 5	
2025	729	Live from Disembodied Falls	20:59	December 5	
2025	730	Live from 10th Anniversary Celebration for Ride Narrator Cube 1720	22:50	December 5	
2025	731	Live at the Power Outage from Lightbulb Skeleton Head Land	18:07	December 5	
2025	732	Live from the Day Night Storm Event	24:18	December 5	
2025	733	Thank You Party for Mercury Ride Inspector	24:19	December 5	
2025	734	Live from Entrance to Levitating Leonard Narrator for Disembodied Canyons	18:06	December 5	
2025	735	Live from the Lobotomy Mr. Potato Head Giveaway	22:40	December 5	
2025	736	Live from Embracing the Stairway to the Unknown	22:51	December 5	
2025	737	Live from Frankenstein’s Mountain	18:22	December 9	
2025	738	Live from Portal to Atlantis	25:22	December 9	
2025	739	Live from the Cosmic Library	20:59	December 9	
2025	740	Live Elevation of Laboratory	18:25	December 9	
2025	741	Live from in Between Dreamworld	23:54	December 9	
2025	742	Live from Lights of Unity	21:24	December 9	
2025	743	Live from Suspended Vacuum	21:16	December 9	
2025	757	Live from Robot Wastelands	20:52	December 24	
2025	760	Live from the Mercury Mines	19:04	December 24	
2025	761	Live from the Silver Shamrock Holiday Party	18:39	December 24	
2026	771	Maskatron Parts	20:20	January 7	
2026	775	Live from Bucketheadland Fugien Vibes Library	17:33	February 20	
2026	776	Live from Bucketheadland Electric Laughing Bag $3.95 Lasts Indefinitely	19:59	February 20	
2026	777	Live from Bucketheadland Portable Laboratory	21:57	February 20	
2026	778	Live from Applying Gauze Event	23:26	February 25	
2026	779	Live from Fantastiques Eye Ball Theatre	18:20	February 25	
2026	780	Live from Dunderhead's Dungeon Mercury Mountain Laboratory	22:06	February 25	
2026	781	Live from Disembodied Mirrors Theatre	19:27	February 25	
2026	782	Live from Candle Hand Theatre	21:09	February 25	
2026	783	Live from Cushing’s Carnival	17:09	February 25	
2026	784	Live from Deluxe Books	18:07	February 25	
2026	785	Live from Super Skeletoncross	21:05	February 25	
2026	786	Live from the Thing This Plant Actually Eats Insects	20:41	February 25	
2026	787	Live from the Christopher Lee Appreciation Event	18:23	February 25	
2026	788	Live from Cyclops Laboratory	23:30	February 25	
2026	789	Live from the Pinball Animatronic Repair Shop	17:23	February 25	
2026	790	Live from the Aud Fiction on Records Event	21:04	February 25	
2026	791	Live from Librarians Cove	20:59	February 25	
2026	792	Live from the Wicker Basket Case	23:51	February 25	
2026	793	Live from the Horror Make-Up Event	18:23	February 25	
2026	794	Live from the Swiss Family Wicker Slunk House	20:00	February 25	
2026	795	Live from Bucketstein Manor	18:37	February 25	
2026	812	Live From Hankering Cliff	19:43	August 4	
2026	813	Live From Point Rays	17:50	August 4	
2026	814	Live From Skeleton Head Cove	19:30	August 4	
2026	815	Live From Parchment Narrows	19:45	August 4	
2026	816	Live from Ice Cream Cone Hill 72 Flavors	20:20	August 22	
2026	817	Live From Void Fortune Teller Event	20:59	August 22	
2026	818	Live from Hieroglyph Hut	17:42	August 22	
2026	819	Live from Houses That Dance	20:20	August 22	
2026	820	Live from the Slug Mines	20:59	August 22	
2026	821	Live from the Claw Bot Benefit Thanking the Claw Bots for Getting Hard-to-Reach Toys and Finding Lost Ice Cream	17:42	August 22	
2026	822	Live from Holograph Cove	22:54	August 22	

=== Singles ===
- 1999: "The Ballad of Buckethead"
- 2004: "Spokes for the Wheel of Torment"
- 2005: "We Are One" (feat. Serj Tankian)
- 2006: "Jordan"
- 2006: "I Like it Raw" (Dedicated to Ol' Dirty Bastard)
- 2011: "The Rising Sun" (Dedicated to Japan Disaster Victims)
- 2018: "Mirror in the Cellar" (free download for Halloween)
- 2018: "Missing My Parents" (free download for Christmas)
- 2020: "Guest of Honor: Paul Frees"
- 2020: "Float Like a Butterfly Sting Like a Bee in Honor of Cameron Boyce"
- 2020: "Beach Fire Pit"
- 2020: "The Whispering Metals"
- 2020: "Beyond the Visable"
- 2020: "Stump City Breakers"
- 2021: "Skylight"
- 2021: "Chicken Sticks"
- 2022: "Idea"
- 2023: "Butterfly Eyes"
- 2023: "My Tree Friend"
- 2023: "Tree Friend for All"
- 2023: "Beautiful Moments that Last"
- 2024: "Spires of the Oceans"
- 2025: "The Hearing Forest"

=== Spoken word albums ===
- 2022: Musical Alchemy (with Red Sulphur)
- 2022: Pelican (with Red Sulphur)

=== Demo tapes ===
- 1989: Brazos (Given to Guitar Player Magazine)
- 1991: Giant Robot
- 1991: Bucketheadland Blueprints
- 1995: Grab Bag#1
- 1996: Grab Bag#2
- 1998: Grab Bag#3

=== Solo DVD videos ===
- 2005: Secret Recipe
- 2006: Young Buckethead Vol. 1
- 2006: Young Buckethead Vol. 2
- 2018: Soothsayer

=== DVD videos with Cornbugs ===
- 2007: Quackers!
- 2007: Headcheese

=== Music videos ===
Year	Title
1999	The Ballad of Buckethead
2004	Spokes for the Wheel of Torment
2005	We Are One
2018	10 31
2020	Eagle Cauldron Pool

=== Unreleased albums ===
- Buckethead Plays Disney
- Super Diorama Theater
- Warm Regards (with Brain and Melissa Reese)

== Bands and projects ==
=== as Death Cube K ===
- 1994: Dreamatorium
- 1997: Disembodied
- 1999: Tunnel
- 2007: DCK
- 2007: Monolith
- 2009: Torn from Black Space
- 2022: Sub Sea Hollow
- 2022: Mirror Interval
- 2022: Magmabot
- 2022: Bennu Mountain
- 2022: Salamander Sanctuary

=== with Alix Lambert and Travis Dickerson ===
- 2008: Running After Deer

=== with Azam Ali ===
- 2025: TBA

=== with Barry Michels ===
- 2020: Contemplation Corner

=== with Brain ===
- 1997: I Need 5 Minutes Alone (As Pieces)
- 2007: Kevin's Noodle House
- 2010: Brain as Hamenoodle

=== with Brain and Melissa ===
- 2010: Best Regards
- 2010: Kind Regards

=== with Brain and Travis Dickerson ===
- 2008: The Dragons of Eden

=== with Cob ===
- 2024: Lobotomy Salon (Single)
- 2024: Flowers of Lead (Single)
- 2024: Lord Lobster
- 2024: Landing on Saturn
- 2025: Castello Dwellers
- 2025: The Old, Abandoned Arcade
- 2025: The Wells of Daphnis (Single)
- 2025: Tranquilizer Hands
- 2025: Brooding on the Balcony
- 2025: A Voice from the Ocean
- 2025: Feed the Clay
- 2025: The Frankenstein Wheel
- 2025: 7 Veils from the Temple of Mirrors
- 2025: Wax Organ Autopsy
- 2025: Heal Light Glow
- 2025: Mt. Oolith
- 2026: Lucid Places
- 2026: Ascend Into The Castle
- 2026: Bug Brow
- 2026: Comet Eclipse
- 2026: Traverse The Sky
- 2026: Venus Tooth Trap
- 2026: Infinity of the Worm
- 2026: Geometry of a Labyrinth
- 2026: Clouds and Ladders
- 2026: Pantheon of Cloaks
- 2026: Indigos Hallow
- 2026: Gluing Skulls
- 2026: Cubik Perspectivisk
- 2026: The Field Has Eyes
- 2026: The Secret of St. Armadillion
- 2026: Slugs in the Mist
- 2026: Footprints on Mars
- 2026: Looking Through The Dewdrop
- 2026: Lunar Frost
- 2026: Ribcage Lobotomy
- 2026: Angled Rooms No Walls
- 2026: Lunar Waves
- 2026: Simultaneous Visions
- 2026: Wig Of Nerves
- 2026: Acidic Tears
- 2026: Freckle Collector
- 2026: Lymph-Node Off-Switch
- 2026: Seared Flesh
- 2026: Cube Shaped Glands
- 2026: Bouquet of Veins
- 2026: Pool Of Acidic Tears
- 2026: Quad Kabob
- 2026: Sinus Vacuum
- 2026: Autopsy Audition
- 2026: 600ft Intestine
- 2026: Fingerprint Shavings
- 2026: Eye Socket Soup
- 2026: Skinned and Grilled
- 2026: Threading Through Clouds
- 2026: Skull Hinge Replacement
- 2026: Tooth Shoe
- 2026: Twisted Hallways
- 2026: Roads To The River
- 2026: The Only Dock on the Island of Lost Minds
- 2026: Freeze Dried Cartilage
- 2026: Hallows Eve

=== with Dan Monti ===
- 2025: New Acoustic Guitar Test

=== with Jonas Hellborg and Michael Shrieve ===
- 1993: Octave of the Holy Innocents (Re-released in 2003)

=== with Madeline Cyrille Miller ===
- 2024: Veins of Institution

=== with Prismo ===
- 2022: Overload (Single)
- 2022: Chemical Cage (Single)

=== with Travis Dickerson ===
- 2006: Chicken Noodles
- 2007: Chicken Noodles II
- 2009: Iconography
- 2010: Left Hanging

=== with Viggo Mortensen ===
- 1997: One Less Thing to Worry About
- 1998: Recent Forgeries
- 1999: The Other Parade
- 1999: One Man's Meat
- 2003: Pandemoniumfromamerica
- 2004: Please Tomorrow
- 2004: This That and The Other (Compilation)
- 2005: Intelligence Failure
- 2008: At All
- 2011: Reunion
- 2013: Acá (two tracks only)
- 2016: Seventeen Odd Songs
- 2018: Godzilla Sleeps Alone

=== Cobra Strike ===
(Buckethead and DJ Disk)

- 1999: The 13th Scroll
- 2000: Cobra Strike II: Y, Y+B, X+Y <hold> ←

=== Colonel Claypool's Bucket of Bernie Brains ===
(Buckethead, Brain, Bernie Worrell, Les Claypool)

- 2004: The Big Eyeball in the Sky

=== Cornbugs ===
(Buckethead, Bill Moseley, Pinchface, Travis Dickerson)

- 1999: Spot the Psycho
- 2001: Cemetery Pinch
- 2001: How Now Brown Cow
- 2004: Brain Circus
- 2004: Donkey Town
- 2005: Rest Home for Robots
- 2005: Skeleton Farm
- 2006: Celebrity Psychos

=== Deli Creeps ===
(Buckethead, Maximum Bob, Pinchface, Dan Monti)

- 1990: Deli Creeps Demo Tape 1990
- 1996: Deli Creeps Demo Tape 1996
- 2005: Dawn of the Deli Creeps

=== El Stew ===
(Buckethead, Brain, Eddie Def, DJ Disk, DJ Extraked)

- 1999: El Stew "Extended Play 1.0"
- 1999: No Hesitation
- 2003: The Rehearsal
- 2011: The Dark Night Of A Million Stains – The Rehearsal #2

=== Frankenstein Brothers ===
(Buckethead & That 1 Guy)

- 2008: Bolt on Neck

=== Giant Robot ===
(Buckethead, Brain, Pete Scaturro)

- 1996: Giant Robot

=== Gorgone ===
(Buckethead, Travis Dickerson, Pinchface)

- 2005: Gorgone

=== Guns N' Roses ===
(Buckethead, Brain, Axl Rose, Robin Finck, Tommy Stinson, Paul Tobias, Dizzy Reed, Chris Pitman, Richard Fortus)

- 2008: Chinese Democracy

=== Praxis ===
(Buckethead, Brain, Bill Laswell)

- 1992: Transmutation (Mutatis Mutandis)
- 1994: Sacrifist
- 1994: Metatron
- 1997: Jazz Á go-go / Live in Poland
- 1997: Transmutation Live
- 1998: Collection
- 1999: Warszawa
- 2005: Zurich
- 2007: Tennessee 2004
- 2008: Profanation (Preparation for a Coming Darkness)
- 2015: Sound Virus

=== Science Faxtion ===
(Buckethead, Brain, Bootsy Collins, Greg Hampton, Tobe Donohue)

- 2008: Living On Another Frequency

=== Shin Terai / Shine / Shin.E ===
(Buckethead, Shin Terai, Bill Laswell, Bernie Worrell)

- 2001: Unison
- 2004: Heaven & Hell
- 2007: Lightyears

=== Thanatopsis ===
(Buckethead, Travis Dickerson, Ramy Antoun)

- 2001: Thanatopsis
- 2003: Axiology
- 2006: Anatomize
- 2015: Requiem

=== Zillatron ===
(Buckethead, Bootsy Collins, Bernie Worrell, Bill Laswell)

- 1993: Lord of the Harvest

== Guest appearances ==
=== Multiple appearances with artists ===
Anton Fier

- 1993 – Dreamspeed
- 2003 – Blindlight 1992–1994

Bernie Worrell

- 1993 – Pieces of Woo: The Other Side
- 1997 – Free Agent: A Spaced Odyssey

Bill Laswell

- 1993 – Axiom Collection II: Manifestation
- 1993 – Divination – Ambient Dub Volume 1
- 1994 – Axiom Ambient – Lost in the Translation
- 1995 – Axiom Funk – Funkcronomicon
- 1995 – Axiom Funk - "If 6 was 9" (Single)
- 1996 – Alien Ambient Galaxy
- 1996 – Myth – Dreams of the World
- 1997 – Valis II – Everything Must Go
- 1998 – Telesterion – Hall of Mysteries
- 2001 – Points of Order
- 2007 – Method of Defiance – Inamorata

Bootsy Collins

- 2006 – Christmas Is 4 Ever
- 2008 – The Official Boot-Legged-Bootsy-CD
- 2011 – Tha Funk Capital of the World
- 2017 – World Wide Funk
- 2019 – Bootzilla Records Archives: Volume 1
- 2023 - "Funk Not Fight" Featuring: Baby Triggy, Fantaazma (non-album single)

Company 91

- 1992 – Company 91 Volume 1
- 1992 – Company 91 Volume 2
- 1992 – Company 91 Volume 3

Phonopsychograph Disk

- 1998 – Ancient Termites
- 1999 – Live @ Slim's / Turbulence Chest
- 1999 – Unrealesed (Cassette Only)
- 2009 – Marsupial's Belly Flop Breaks (Remastered version)
- 2013 – Unrealesed (CD version)

Freekbass

- 2003 – The Air Is Fresher Underground
- 2007 – A Sliver of Shiver (Live DVD)
- 2008 – Junkyard Waltz

Icehouse

- 1993 - "Big Wheel" (Single)
- 1993 – Spin One (EP)
- 1994 – Full Circle
- 1994 - "Great Southern Land" (German single)
- 1997 – Masterfile (Japanese release)

Lawson Rollins

- 2011 – Elevation

Mike Patton with Buckethead and DJ Flare, forming Moonraker

- 2000 – Live @ The Knitting Factory (Bootleg only)

Refrigerator

- 1997 – Somehow – Buckethead plays the guitar as well as the samples (cut 3)

=== Single appearance with artist(s) ===
- 1991 – Henry Kaiser – Hope You Like Our New Direction
- 1992 – Will Ackerman – The Opening of Doors
- 1993 – MCM and the Monster – Collective Emotional Problems
- 1993 – Psyber Pop – What? So What?
- 1994 – Jon Hassell and Blue Screen – Dressing for Pleasure – Buckethead plays the Electric Bass on Track 10.
- 1994 – Hakim Bey – T.A.Z. (Temporary Autonomous Zone)
- 1995 – Buckshot LeFonque - "No Pain No Gain" (Single with remixes)
- 1995 – Julian Schnabel – Every Silver Lining Has a Cloud
- 1997 – Arcana -Arc of the Testimony (guitar on three tracks)
- 1998 – Bastard Noise – Split W/Spastic Colon
- 1998 – DJ Qbert – Wave Twisters
- 1999 – Banyan – Anytime at All
- 1999 – Ben Wa – Devil Dub
- 2000 – Double E – Audio Men
- 2000 – Tony Furtado Band – Tony Furtado Band
- 2001 – Meridiem – A Pleasant Fiction (re-release in 2009)
- 2001 – Gonervill – Gonervill
- 2002 – Fishbone and the Familyhood Nextperience Present: The Friendliest Psychosis of All
- 2003 – Gemini – Product of Pain
- 2005 – Bassnectar – Mesmerizing The Ultra
- 2006 – Gigi – Gold & Wax
- 2007 – Melissa Reese – Lissa
- 2017 – Gaudi – Magnetic – guitar on Nocturnal Sonata
- 2018 – Asterism – Ignition
- 2025 – Weakened Friends – Feels Like Hell – guitar on NPC

=== Soundtracks ===
- 1993 – Last Action Hero (soundtrack)
- 1993 – Last Action Hero (score)
- 1995 – Johnny Mnemonic (soundtrack)
- 1995 – Mighty Morphin' Power Rangers The Movie: Original Soundtrack Album (soundtrack)
- 1995 – Mortal Kombat (soundtrack)
- 1996 – Stealing Beauty (soundtrack)
- 1997 – Beverly Hills Ninja (soundtrack)
- 1997 – Mortal Kombat: Annihilation (soundtrack)
- 2001 – Ghosts of Mars (soundtrack)
- 2001 – Dragon Ball Z: The History of Trunks (soundtrack)
- 2002 – Scratch (soundtrack)
- 2004 – Flesh for the Beast (score)
- 2005 – Masters of Horror (soundtrack)
- 2005 – Saw 2 (soundtrack)
- 2009 – Brüno (Unreleased track "Divide and Conquer" by Giant Robot II)
- 2012 – Twisted Metal ("Ready to Die" by Buckethead and Brain – re-worked track "Peak" from "Kind Regards" album)
- 2019 – Sigil for Doom (soundtrack)
- 2021 – Falling (soundtrack, with Viggo Mortensen and Skating Polly)

=== Compilations ===
- 1997 – Guitar Zone
- 1997 – Guitars on Mars
- 1998 – Night and Day
- 1998 – Guitarisma 2
- 1998 – Great Jewish Music: Marc Bolan (otherwise unreleased cover of "20th Century Boy")
- 1998 – New Yorker Out Loud: Volume 2
- 1999 – Crash Course in Music
- 1999 – Horizons
- 1999 – Music for the New Millennium
- 2001 – Innerhythmic Sound System
- 2001 – Bomb Anniversary Collection
- 2001 – Gonervill presents: The Freak Brothers
- 2002 – Guitars for Freedom
- 2002 – The Meta Collection (otherwise unreleased track "Remember")
- 2002 – Urban Revolutions
- 2002 – Live from Bonnaroo 2002 – Volume 2 (otherwise unreleased C2B3 song "Number Two")
- 2005 – Blue Sueños (otherwise unreleased track "Planeta")
- 2006 – Guitar Hero II ("Jordan")
- 2006 – The Longest Yard (Jack and the Ripper)
- 2008 – Fallen Soldiers Memorial (otherwise unreleased track "Buckets of Blood" with Bootsy Collins)
- 2008 – Guitar Hero III ("Soothsayer")
- 2008 – Rock Band 2 ("Shackler's Revenge" with Guns N' Roses)
- 2012 – PlayStation All-Stars Battle Royale (Ready To Die from Twisted Metal)

=== Other ===
- 1992, 2000 – Six String Giant, a bootleg CD

== Videography ==
- Buckethead – Binge Clips (series of seven VHS tapes)
- Buckethead – Killer Grabbag of Shards (CD-ROM featuring footage of live shows)
- Buckethead - "Viva Voltron"
- Buckethead - Guitar One Magazine Instructional Video (CD-ROM, 2006)

=== With other artists ===
- Axiom Funk - "If 6 Was 9"
- Deli Creeps - "Deli Creeps" [1991 Live VHS tape]
- Bootsy Collins - "Funk Express Card"
- Bryan Mantia – Brain's Lessons
- Bryan Mantia – The worst drum instructional video ever DVD
- DJ Qbert - "Inner Space Dental Commander"
- DJ Qbert – Wave Twisters
- Freekbass - "Always Here"
- Guns N' Roses - "Better" (unreleased)
- Praxis - "Animal Behaviour"
- Praxis - "Inferno / Heat Seeker / Exploded Heart"
- Primus – Videoplasty
- Primus – Animals Should Not Try To Act Like People (DVD easter egg)
- Snoop Dogg - "Undacova Funk"
- Thanatopsis - "Pyrrhic Victory"
- Colonel Claypool's Bucket of Bernie Brains – Les Claypool's 5 Gallons of Diesel
- Serj Tankian - "We Are One"
- Bootsy Collins - "Minds Under Construction"
- Bootsy Collins - "Monster Mash"

== See also ==
- List of ambient music artists
