= Mold (album) =

Studio album by Praxis
- Released: August 18, 1998
- Genre: Experimental
- Length: 67:57
- Label: Yikes
- Producer: Bill Laswell

Praxis chronology
1984 (1997)	Mold (1998)	Collection (1998)

Mold is the fourth studio album made by experimental music group Praxis, released in 1998. Despite being released under the Praxis name the group's usual musicians, guitarist Buckethead and drummer Brain, are absent; frontman Bill Laswell is the only member that appeared on earlier releases to be included on the album.

== Track listing ==
All music is composed by Bill Laswell.

No.	Title	Length
1.	"Meldt"	9:10
2.	"Narcoleprosy"	4:13
3.	"Electric Soil"	3:25
4.	"Sunshine"	3:04
5.	"Babble Stream"	5:24
6.	"First Wish After Death"	1:37
7.	"Lichenous Shock"	6:52
8.	"Throes of Rasputin"	8:54
9.	"Sqlxzm"	4:14
10.	"Septic Plague"	12:59
11.	"Viral Sonata #69"	8:05

== Personnel ==
- Praxis:
  - Alex Haas - keyboards, producer, engineer, mixing
  - Bill Laswell - bass, scratching, producer
  - Pat Thrall - guitar
  - Peter Wetherbee - synthesizer, guitar, drums, vocals, producer, loops, mixing, beats
- Julian Joyce - assistant engineer
- Joe Lambert - mastering
- Aldo Sampieri - art direction, photography
