= Ben Wa (band) =

US musical group

- Origin: USA
- Genres: Electronic, Dub
- Years active: 1998 - 2001
- Labels: Black Hole Records, Malvado Records, Stray Records
- Past members: Anthony "House" Chaba, Eric Ware

Ben Wa was an American electronic band from Oakland, California comprising Anthony "House" Chaba (programming and bass guitar) and Eric Ware (programming and keyboards), who had worked together before in bands such as Limbomaniacs, Big Janitor, and MCM & the Monster.

After releasing a four track EP 1 full of breaks and electro in 1998 they began recording their debut album Devil Dub featuring guest musicians such as guitarists Buckethead and M.I.R.V., drummer Bryan "Brain" Mantia and turntablist DJ Disk, plus Scientist live on stage for the release party in January 1999. Chaba and Ware had met Scientist when opening for Bill Laswell's Praxis in San Francisco.

Reviews for Devil Dub were positive with URB calling it "one of the most crucial records of any genre released this year" and Michelle Goldberg of Metro Silicon Valley stating: "The lazy pace is lulling, but like Tricky's music, it's more edgy and creepy than ethereal." Rick Anderson of Allmusic gave 4,5 out of 5 stars, writing: "This is remarkably pleasant stuff." Noah Wayne of online music magazine Splendid wrote: "It's campy, it's twisted, it's dub!"

Two of their tracks, "Re-Dub" and "Ephedream", were included on Laswell's releases Reanimator: Black Market Science and Tetragrammaton - Submerge. They also contributed tracks to a few other dub compilations.

Another EP called Elektro-Krazy followed in 2000, again concentrating on breaks and electro and described on Epitonic as "the gap between Detroit techno and funky dance floor breaks in a most ingenious way". Their next album Disciples Of Retro-Tech was released in 2001 as a double vinyl and single compact disc, featuring explorations of pure electro and synth-pop terrain. Stephen Cook of Allmusic wrote: "The hybrid mix is so inventive that suspect pastiche and old-school chic absolutely do not figure into it". He gave the album 4 out of 5 stars. Daiv Whaley of music newspaper Hear/Say concluded his review: "This is cool, accessible music for every child of man and machine. File under 'electro-funk,' file under 'fantastic.'"

== Discography ==
- EP 1 (12" EP on Black Hole Records, 1998)
- Devil Dub (CD album on Black Hole Records, 1998)
- Elektro-Krazy (12" EP on Malvado Records, 2000)
- Retro-Tech EP (12" EP on Stray Records, 2001)
- Disciples Of Retro-Tech (Double vinyl and single CD album on Stray Records, 2001)

=== Devil Dub ===
Devil Dub

Studio album by Ben Wa
- Released: January 13, 1999
- Recorded: 1998
- Genres: Dub music, experimental rock
- Length: 65:42
- Label: Black Hole
- Producer: Ben Wa

Ben Wa chronology
''Devil Dub'' (1999)	Disciples of Retro-Tech (2001)

Professional ratings
Review scores
Source	Rating
Allmusic	4.5/5 stars

Devil Dub is the 1999 debut album by San Francisco Bay Area band Ben Wa consisting of "Dr. Ware" and "House"(Limbomaniacs, Tommy Guerrero, Buckethead's Giant Robot, MCM & the Monster).

After forming in 1997, contributing to several compilations and releasing an EP in 1998, Devil Dub was the first full-length release by the duo. House sums up:

The way Devil Dub was created never placed us all in the studio together at the same time (...) Each person came in for a day or two and we recorded them improvising. First we had Brain play to some click tracks in a studio and then sampled him back in our laboratory. Armed with these beats Dr. Ware and I created the grooves, and asked everyone else to come in as their schedules permitted. (...) It's like acting in a Science Fiction film that incorporates computer generated effects- the actors know there WILL be a giant animated monster in front of them, but they have to wait for a screening to see what the hell it looks like!

— House

Guest musicians finally included avant-garde guitarist Buckethead, drummer Brain (with Primus at this time) and DJ Disk (from the Invisibl Skratch Piklz).

A critics from URB magazine called it "one of the most crucial records of any genre released this year".

==== Track listing ====
No.	Title	Length
1.	"Descent"	0:37
2.	"Macrocardio Dub Infarction"	6:58
3.	"Parastolic Dub"	6:22
4.	"Dubasaurus Rex"	6:16
5.	"Floridub"	6:53
6.	"Interlude In Limbo"	0:37
7.	"Ancient Chinese Secret (In Dub Sauce)"	7:29
8.	"Soopfuh Beemuh"	7:00
9.	"The Fall"	0:43
10.	"Vampire (Slight Return)"	6:36
11.	"Beelzebub Dub"	5:10
12.	"White Russian Dub"	6:35
13.	"Good 'n' Evil Dub"	4:26

==== Personnel ====
- Buckethead – guitar, neuro-pulse guitar-activated Larynx Modeler
- DJ Disk – turntable, orange Bear
- Brain – beats
- M.I.R.V. – broken guitar
- Adrian Isabell – percussion
- Dr. Ware – keyboards, programming
- House – bass, programming
- Dow W. Patten – preacher
- Recorded at Tyrell Studios, Oakland CA
- Produced by Ben Wa.

==== Notes ====
Ben wa humbly acknowledged the following for inspiration: Scientist, Mad Professor, Lee 'Scratch' Perry, King Tubby, Sly and Robbie, Bill Laswell and Kraftwerk.
