= Warszawa (Praxis album) =

Live album by Praxis
- Released: February 2, 1999
- Recorded: Sala Kongresowa, Warsaw, Poland, June 29, 1996
- Genres: Avant-garde, rock, experimental, heavy metal, electronic
- Length: 44:37
- Label: Innerhythmic

Praxis chronology
Collection (1998)	Warszawa (1999)	Zurich (2005)

Professional ratings
Review scores
Source	Rating
Allmusic	4/5 stars

Warszawa is a live album by experimental rock band Praxis, released in 1999 by the label Innerhythmic.

The album contains three of the supergroup's most influential members: bassist and producer Bill Laswell, guitarist Buckethead, and drummer Brain. This album was recorded during a live show in Warsaw, Poland and has some resemblance to the band's earlier funk-influenced material, containing elements of 1992's Transmutation (Mutatis Mutandis) and the loud heavy metal and noise rock elements reminiscent of 1994's Sacrifist. Besides Laswell, Buckethead and Brain, the album also contains contributions from turntablists Mix Master Mike and PhonosycographDISK.

The album opens with "Initiation", a 20-minute turntable epic that mixes albums like Snoop's Murder Was the Case with kung-fu movie samples.

A video of the concert was shot and edited.

== Track listing ==
No.	Title	Length
1.	"Initiation"	21:05
2.	"Flux And Reflux"	6:00
3.	"Saturn"	5:29
4.	"Destroyer"	6:54
5.	"Fifth Element"	5:09

== Personnel ==
- Buckethead – electric guitar
- Bill Laswell – bass guitar
- Brain – drums, percussion
- Mix Master Mike – turntables, samples
- PhonosycographDISK – turntables, samples
- DXT (uncredited) - turntables, keyboards

== Recording Staff ==
- Bill Murphy - Producer
- Oz Fritz – Engineer
- Michael Fossenkemper – Mastering
- Robert Musso – Engineer
- Shinro Ohtake – Artwork
