= Tennessee 2004 =

Live album by Praxis
- Released: June 5, 2007
- Recorded: 2004
- Genres: Acid rock, dub, experimental metal, psychedelic rock, ambient, funk metal
- Length: 58:05
- Label: ROIR

Praxis chronology
Zurich (2005)	Tennessee 2004 (2007)	Profanation (Preparation for a Coming Darkness) (2008)

Professional ratings
Review scores
Source	Rating
AllMusic	positive
PopMatters	8/10 stars
Sea of Tranquility	4.5/5 stars

Tennessee 2004 is a live album by the experimental rock band Praxis, released in 2007 but recorded at the Bonnaroo Music and Arts Festival near Manchester, Tennessee during the early morning hours of June 12, 2004.

This album features core Praxis members Bill Laswell, Buckethead and Brain, in addition to keyboardist Bernie Worrell.

An extended recording of that show, including tracks that are missing from the 2007 CD release, is available as a paid download from the Bonnaroo website.

== Track listing ==
No.	Title	Length
1.	"Vertebrae"	4:31
2.	"Spun"	5:50
3.	"Night Of The Slunk"	4:39
4.	"Guitar Virus"	3:37
5.	"Machine Gun"	7:11
6.	"Haunted"	1:44
7.	"Broken/Fractal"	4:45
8.	"Bent Light"	5:36
9.	"Chopper"	3:55
10.	"Optic"	4:57
11.	"Magus"	11:20

== Notes ==
- "Vertebrae" is an early version of Buckethead's song "Jordan", which was released as a single two years later.
- "Night Of The Slunk" originally featured on Buckethead's 1999 album Monsters and Robots.
- "Guitar Virus" incorporates Buckethead's song "Big Sur Moon" from the 1998 album Colma.
- "Bent Light" is an alternate version of "The Interworld And The New Innocence" from the band's 1992 album Transmutation (Mutatis Mutandis).
- "Magus" includes themes from the Miles Davis composition "Dark Magus".

== Personnel ==
- Buckethead - electric guitar
- Bill Laswell - bass guitar
- Brain - drums, percussion
- Bernie Worrell - keyboards

== Production Staff ==
- John Brown - cover design
- James Dellatacoma - assistant
- Michael Fossenkemper - mastering
- Oz Fritz - engineer
