= Jordan (Buckethead composition) =

Single by Buckethead
- Released: August 18, 2009 (iTunes Version)
- Recorded: 2006
- Genre: Progressive metal
- Length: 3:50
- Label: Buckethead
- Songwriter: Buckethead

"Jordan" is a musical composition by American musician Buckethead. Originally featured as a playable track on the 2006 music video game Guitar Hero II, "Jordan" was officially released as a downloadable single via iTunes on August 18, 2009.

== Background ==
Excerpt of "Jordan"
First two bars of "Jordan"

Prior to the inclusion of a studio version of "Jordan" on Guitar Hero II, the instrumental was performed live by Buckethead at a number of shows. While performing the track, Buckethead would omit the guitar solos and interpolate another song (often "Post Office Buddy" from Giant Robot), a series of songs or an improvisation. One such early live version was released as "Vertebrae" on the Praxis live album Tennessee 2004 in 2007. Since the release of the studio version, Buckethead has often included the solo in his live performances of "Jordan".

An alternate version of "Jordan" was re-created specifically for the video game Guitar Hero II. It is considered one of the most difficult tracks to play in the series on Expert difficulty, due to the complexity of its guitar solos, particularly the "Guitar Solo B" and "Guitar Solo C" sections. On the Xbox 360 version, the "Kick the Bucket Award" is an achievement worth 30 gamerscore, and is awarded for completing "Jordan" on Expert difficulty.

The Guitar Hero series' resident guitarist Marcus Henderson stated that Buckethead feels "Jordan" to be one of the best things he has ever recorded. It was also stated in an interview with Henderson that "Jordan" is named after Michael Jordan, of whom Buckethead is a huge fan. In fact, the single's cover is a reference to the Jumpman logo seen on many Jordan-related merchandise, like the Air Jordan shoe brand.

== Technique ==
Main guitar riff of "Jump Man"

Main guitar riff of "Night Of the Slunk"

The main riff of "Jordan" is played using left hand hammer-ons and pull-offs, while Buckethead's right hand uses his trademark kill switch. The main guitar riff also features extensive use of a DigiTech Whammy pitch shifter. The off-beat 16th note rhythm scheme is reminiscent of Buckethead's earlier songs "Jump Man" (also dedicated to Michael Jordan) and "Night of the Slunk", both first released on Monsters and Robots (1999).

According to Travis Dickerson, operator of the studio where "Jordan" was recorded, "the take ultimately used [for the studio version] was played in one unbroken, unedited pass".
