= Live @ Slim's / Turbulence Chest =

Live album by Phonopsychograph Disk
- Released: 1999, 2007
- Recorded: December 20, 1998
- Length: 57:11
- Label: Turntablist Records
- Producer: DJ Disk

Live @ Slim's / Turbulence Chest is a live album by a musical supergroup headed by DJ Disk under the name Phonopsychograph Disk.

== Track listing ==
1. "Sycograph Intro" - 4:17
2. "Coffee Sack" - 4:48
3. "Duck's Decay" - 5:13
4. "Clear" - 5:18
5. "Blow?" - 5:10
6. "Slender Face" - 6:54
7. "Polar Bear Moonskreen" - 3:14
8. "Brain Practicing 'Asshole'" - 3:04
9. "Thinking Room Sculpture" - 4:15
10. "Employment Crystal Rooster" - 4:40
11. "Shaften the Turtle" - 1:43
12. "Fuckface Encore" - 8:35

== rerelease Track listing ==
1. "Coffee Sack" - 4:48
2. "Duck's Decay" - 5:13
3. "Clear" - 5:18
4. "Blow?" - 5:10
5. "Slender Face" - 6:54
6. "Polar Bear Moonskreen" - 3:14
7. "Brain Pounding" - 3:04
8. "Thinking Room Sculpture" - 4:15
9. "Employment Crystal Rooster" - 4:40
10. "Shaften the Turtle" - 1:43
11. "Funkface Encore" - 8:35
12. "Confused but Stoned" - 6:66

== Personnel ==
- DJ Disk - turntable, vocoder
- Brain - acoustic and electric drums
- Buckethead - guitars and dolls
- Extrakd - bass
- Les Claypool - additional bass (tracks 5–12)
- MCM - words (tracks 6, 11)

All tracks written by DJ Disk, except "Clear" by Cybotron, "Blow?" by Buckethead, and "Slender Face" by MCM and DJ Disk.
