= Disembodied (Buckethead album) =

Studio album by Death Cube K
- Released: July 22, 1997
- Genre: Dark ambient, ambient, experimental
- Length: 44:48
- Label: ION
- Producer: Buckethead, Bill Laswell

Death Cube K chronology
| Dreamatorium (1994) | Disembodied (1997) | Tunnel (1999) |

Professional ratings
Review scores
| Source | Rating |
|---|---|
| Allmusic | 3/5 stars |

Disembodied is Buckethead's second album under the name Death Cube K (an anagram for Buckethead). It was released on July 22, 1997, by ION Records, and was produced by Bill Laswell.

== Track listing ==
| No. | Title | Length |
|---|---|---|
| 1. | "Disembodied" | 9:15 |
| 2. | "Embalmed" | 4:59 |
| 3. | "Terror Tram" | 9:36 |
| 4. | "Hanging Gallows" | 5:33 |
| 5. | "Pre Hack" | 15:30 |
| Total length: | | 44:48 |

== Personnel ==
- Death Cube K (a.k.a. Buckethead) - guitar, Dr. Phibes organ, stretching rake.
- Extrakd - ambient nightmare machete.
- Bill Laswell - bass.
- Recorded at the Embalming Plant, Oakland; California.
- Additional recording and mixing at Greenpoint Studio, Brooklyn; New York.
- Produced by Buckethead and Bill Laswell.
