= Six String Giant =

Studio album by Buckethead
- Recorded: 1992, 2000
- Length: 27:20; 67:33

Six String Giant is a bootleg CD by Buckethead that includes two live shows: live at The Palace in Tokyo, Japan July 8, 1992, and live at The Electric Church in New York, New York, on April 27, 2000.

== Track listing ==
Live at The Palace
No.	Title	Length
1.	"Skids Looking Where"	3:02
2.	"End of Phantom Monk"	0:48
3.	"When You Wish Upon a Star"	0:53
4.	"Cattle Prod/Solo"	1:39
5.	"Aquabot"	4:24
6.	"Pirate's Life for Me"	0:29
7.	"Beginning of Phantom Monk"	5:42
8.	"I Love My Parents"	1:15
9.	"Nosin'"	1:04
10.	"Terminator Theme"	1:23
11.	"Taccato and Fugue in D Minor"	0:43
12.	"Halloween Theme"	0:17
13.	"Unknown Theme Song"	1:41
14.	"Interlude/Solo"	2:50
15.	"Giant Robot"	1:10
Total length:		27:20

Live at The Electric Church
No.	Title	Length
16.	"Introduction"	1:45
17.	"Jowls"	4:24
18.	"Jumpman"	4:26
19.	"Giant Robot/Solo/Nuntyaku"	6:06
20.	"Pirate's Life for Me/Chicken Pickin'"	1:45
21.	"Huge Unaccompained Solo"	9:25
22.	"Big Sur Moon"	6:36
23.	"Night of the Slunk"	5:46
Total length:		40:13

== Personnel ==
- Buckethead – guitars, bass
