= Metatron (Praxis album) =

Studio album by Praxis
- Released: August 12, 1994
- Genre: Avant-garde metal, dark ambient, dub, funk metal, progressive rock
- Length: 47:47
- Label: Subharmonic

Praxis chronology
Sacrifist (1994)	Metatron (1994)	Live in Poland (1997)

Professional ratings
Review scores
Source	Rating
Allmusic	3/5 stars

Metatron is the third album by experimental rock group Praxis. Rather than featuring numerous guests like earlier albums Metatron is notable for having only the core lineup of bassist and frontman Bill Laswell, guitarist Buckethead and drummer Brain.

== Track listing ==
No.	Title	Length
1.	"Wake the Dead"	3:41
2.	"Skull Crack (We Are Not Sick Men)"	5:16
3.	"Meta-Matic"	2:30
4.	"Cathedral Space (Soft Hail of Electrons)"	1:20
5.	"Turbine"	2:36
6.	"Vacuum-Mass"	1:01
7.	"Cannibal (Heart Shape of the Iron Blade)"	3:07
8.	"Inferno/Heatseeker/Exploded Heart"	9:21
9.	"Warm Time Machine/Low End Transmission/Over the Foaming Deep"	4:14
10.	"Double Vision"	3:11
11.	"Armed (T.S.A. Agent #5)"	2:16
12.	"Warcraft (Bruce Lee's Black Hour of Chaos)"	3:07
13.	"Triad (The Saw is Family)"	3:13
14.	"Space After (The Consciousness That Dances and Kills)"	2:54

== Personnel ==
- Praxis:
  - Buckethead - guitar
  - Brain - drums
  - Bill Laswell - bass
