= Invisibl Skratch Piklz =

American hip hop group

- Also known as: Shadow of the Prophet
- Origin: San Francisco, California, U.S.
- Genres: Hip hop, turntablism
- Years active: 1989–present
- Labels: Asphodel, Hip Hop Slam
- Members: DJ Qbert; Shortkut; D-Styles; Mix Master Mike
- Past members: DJ Disk; DJ Flare; Yogafrog; A-Trak; DJ Apollo

The Invisibl Skratch Piklz are an American group of turntablists.

The members of the group were originally hip-hop DJs, who were among the pioneers of the turntablism movement in the 1990s; turntablists create musical pieces by mixing samples from records, and by using multiple turntables as instruments.

== History ==
The group started in 1989 as Shadow of the Prophet, with DJ Qbert, Mix Master Mike, and DJ Apollo, who left the group in 1993. The group later added DJ Disk, Shortkut, DJ Flare, Yogafrog, D-Styles, and A-Trak to their lineup. They released numerous mix projects and albums and were featured in documentaries such as Battle Sounds and Scratch. The Invisibl Skratch Piklz performed their last show on July 1, 2000 at the Skratchcon 2000 conference in San Francisco, California.

They were asked by the Disco Mix Club (DMC), an international DJ association, to stop competing since they were discouraging other DJs from entering.

The Piklz produced most of their work around 1995–2000. During that period, they also gave numerous performances and seminars around the world, helped in the design of various DJ products for Vestax and Ortofon, and developed the "break record", a tool used by most present-day turntablists. One of their most notable performances was an International Turntablist Federation (ITF) battle between themselves and the X-Men (now the X-Ecutioners) of New York. Their group routine for this battle, shown on bootleg videos, was later recorded in a studio and released as The Invisibl Skratch Piklz Vs. Da Klams Uv Deth. All previous members of the group have gone on to solo careers, most notably DJ Qbert & Mix Master Mike. Qbert, Mix Master Mike, Shortkut, and DJ Disk are featured in a live performance on the Praxis album Transmutation Live, recorded in 1997. They performed altogether under the name Invisibl Scratch Piklz at Soundset Festival 2017. On September 21, 2019, the original trio was on hand and performed a set at the Fool's Gold Day Off event at Midway SF.

== Discography ==
- Mongoose Shuttle (1997) (unreleased)
- Vs. Da Klams Uv Deth (1997) (Asphodel)
- The Shiggar Fraggar Show, Volume 5 (1998) (Hip Hop Slam)
- The Shiggar Fraggar Show, Volume 4 (1999) (Hip Hop Slam)
- The Shiggar Fraggar Show, Volume 3 (1999) (Hip Hop Slam)
- The Shiggar Fraggar Show, Volume 2 (1999) (Hip Hop Slam)
- The Shiggar Fraggar Show, Volume 1 (2000) (Hip Hop Slam)
- Shiggar Fraggar 2000 (2000) (Hip Hop Slam)
- The 13th Floor (2016) (Alpha Pup)

== See also ==
- Alternative hip hop
- Filipino hip hop
- Turntablism
