= DJ Flare =

American turntablist

DJ Flare (born Sean Moran) is an American turntablist. He has been a scratch DJ since 1983 with many vinyl releases and was a member of the turntablist group the Invisibl Skratch Piklz, appearing in many of their Turntable TV videos and DJ Qbert's animated film Wave Twisters. He released battle records under the pseudonym "DJ Butchwax" on the Thud Rumble and Dirtstyle Records labels. He also created the Flare Scratch, a scratching technique in which a sound is split in two parts leaving limitless sound possibilities to be created. He released a Scratch DVD called Magnifrying Glass. He is also credited for creating the modern day style of Scratch Flare Scratching. Notable mentions, Flare was also a member of Sound Odyssey, Bullet Proof Scratch Hamsters and N.C.A "no clickers allowed" DJ crew and has worked with such music artists as Run-DMC, Third Eye Blind, El' Stew, Buckethead, Moonraker, MCM & The Monster and singer Mike Patton from Faith No More amongst others.

DJ Flare was featured in the 2001 documentary film Scratch, and also in Wave Twisters.

== Discography ==
- DJ Flare and D-Styles - Pharaohs of Funk-CD-(2000-Slit Wrist Recordings)
- DJ Flare - Magnifrying Glass-Dj tool-DVD-(2005-DropZone Studio Recordings)
- DJ Flare and Extrakd - Electrocutioner-12" single-(2001-Stray Records)

All of these releases are Battle records.

- Butt Crack Breaks
- Butt Ugly Breaks
- Barnyard Breaks
- Hee Haw Breaks
- Hee Haw Breaks 2
- Heavy Petting Breaks
- Headshrinker Breaks
- HillBilly Breaks
- Horny Martian Breaks
- Stoney Breaks
- Shampoo Breaks
- Shiggar Fraggar (2000)
- Seek and Destroy Breaks Vol.5
