= The Big Eyeball in the Sky =

2004 studio album by Colonel Claypool's Bucket of Bernie Brains

Studio album by Colonel Claypool's Bucket of Bernie Brains
- Released: September 21, 2004
- Recorded: 2004
- Studio: Rancho Relaxo
- Genres: Jazz rock; experimental rock
- Length: 55:44
- Label: Prawn Song Records
- Producer: Les Claypool

The Big Eyeball in the Sky is the only studio album by the supergroup Colonel Claypool's Bucket of Bernie Brains, known by fans as "C2B3", released on Les Claypool's own Prawn Song label.

The song Junior was written about the Iraq War and is a critique of the Bush administration's foreign policy.

== Reception ==
Professional ratings
Review scores
Source	Rating
AllMusic	3.5/5 stars

AllMusic gave the album an above average review, writing:

"The eyeball-dominated graphics seem like an homage to the Residents and the music similarly aims for an experimental collision between that legendary far-out band's non-commercial approach and a Frank Zappa-styled jazz-rock blend."

— Hal Horowitz of AllMusic

== Track listing ==
All tracks are written by Les Claypool, Buckethead, Bernie Worrell, and Bryan Mantia.

No.	Title	Length
1.	"Buckethead"	5:57
2.	"Thai Noodles"	3:36
3.	"Tyranny of the Hunt"	4:55
4.	"Elephant Ghost"	10:01
5.	"Hip Shot from the Slab"	3:52
6.	"Junior"	4:22
7.	"Scott Taylor"	6:15
8.	"The Big Eyeball in the Sky"	4:36
9.	"Jackalope"	3:46
10.	"48 Hours to Go"	4:15
11.	"Ignorance is Bliss"	4:16

== Credits ==
- Colonel Claypool's Bucket of Bernie Brains:
  - Les Claypool – basses and vocals, producer, engineer
  - Buckethead – guitar
  - Brain – drums
  - Bernie Worrell – keyboards
- Additional personnel:
  - Gabby La La – backing vocals on "Hip Shot from the Slab" and "The Big Eyeball in the Sky"
- Stephen Marcussen – mastering
