= Transmutation Live =

Live album by Praxis
- Released: October 7, 1997
- Recorded: Zurich, Switzerland, June 21, 1996
- Genres: avant-garde, rock, experimental, heavy metal, electronic music
- Length: 60:05
- Label: Douglas

Praxis chronology
Live in Poland (1997)	Transmutation Live (1997)	1984 (1997)

Professional ratings
Review scores
Source	Rating
Allmusic	4/5 stars

Transmutation Live is a live album by experimental rock band Praxis, recorded during a performance in Zurich, Switzerland, in the summer of 1996.

The album features the lineup of bassist Bill Laswell, guitarist Buckethead, drummer Brain and Invisibl Skratch Piklz, the Bay-Area collective of turntablists DXT, Q*bert, Mix Master Mike, Shortkut, and DJ Disk.

The album's four tracks are labeled simply as Movements 1 to 4 and are predominantly ambient soundscapes that frequently give way to heavy metal grooves.

== Track listing ==
No.	Title	Length
1.	"Movement 1"	15:25
2.	"Movement 2"	14:05
3.	"Movement 3"	15:30
4.	"Movement 4"	15:05

== Personnel ==
- Bill Laswell – bass guitar
- Buckethead – electric guitar
- Brain – drums, percussion
- Invisible Scratch Pickles – turntables, samples

== Production staff ==
- Bacon – design
- Cimarron – design
- O'Brien – design
- Oz Fritz – engineer
- James Koehnline – cover art
- Bill Murphy – liner notes
- Robert Musso – production, mastering
