= Profanation (Preparation for a Coming Darkness) =

Studio album by Praxis
- Released: January 1, 2008
- Genres: Experimental rock, alternative rock
- Length: 47:46 (Normal Edition); 60:43 (Bonus Tracks Edition)
- Labels: NAGUAL, M.O.D. Technologies
- Producer: Bill Laswell

Praxis chronology
Tennessee 2004 (2007)	Profanation (Preparation for a Coming Darkness) (2008)

Professional ratings
Review scores
Source	Rating
AllMusic	4/5 stars

Profanation (Preparation for a Coming Darkness) is the fifth and last album by Praxis, released in Japan on January 1, 2008. The album features guest appearances by Iggy Pop, Mike Patton, Serj Tankian, and Killah Priest among others; notably it features some of the last known recordings of Rammellzee. The album had a US release via M.O.D. Technologies in 2011.

For more than a year, the album was only available for purchase by ordering it from Japan. Japanese website "Neowing" released samples of each song. On February 3, 2009, it became available as a digital download.

A US version was released on January 25, 2011, through Bill Laswell's new label, M.O.D. Technologies. The re-release features two new live tracks, "Wedge" and "Subgrid". Not long after this re-release, Laswell commented on the likely end of the band and that he considered the band as a "closed chapter". M.O.D. Technologies also slated (through their distributor Redeye Distribution) a vinyl version for April 2013.

== Track listing ==
No.	Title	Length
1.	"Caution"	1:58
2.	"Worship"	3:37
3.	"Ancient World"	3:25
4.	"Furies"	4:44
5.	"Galaxies"	4:27
6.	"Sulfur and Cheese"	4:44
7.	"Larynx"	2:31
8.	"Revelations Part 2"	5:19
9.	"Ruined"	4:07
10.	"Garbage God's"	2:44
11.	"Babylon Blackout"	5:12
12.	"Endtime"	4:57

=== US release (bonus tracks) ===
No.	Title	Length
1.	"Wedge"	3:02
2.	"Subgrid"	9:55

== Personnel ==
=== By song ===
Track	Title	Vocals	Guitar	Bass	Drums	Keyboards	Turntables	Beats
1	Caution	Rammellzee	Buckethead	Bill Laswell	Brain		PhonosycographDISK	
2	Worship	Hawkman & Maximum Bob	Buckethead	Bill Laswell	Brain			
3	Ancient World	Dr. Israel	Buckethead	Bill Laswell			Grandmixer DXT	Monkey & Large
4	Furies	Iggy Pop	Buckethead	Bill Laswell	Brain			
5	Galaxies	Killah Priest	Buckethead	Bill Laswell	Brain	Bernie Worrell	PhonosycographDISK	
6	Sulfur and Cheese	Serj Tankian	Buckethead	Bill Laswell	Brain			
7	Larynx	Mike Patton	Buckethead	Bill Laswell			PhonosycographDISK	Future Prophecies
8	Revelations Part 2	Rammellzee	Buckethead	Bill Laswell	Brain	Bernie Worrell	PhonosycographDISK	
9	Ruined			Bill Laswell	Tatsuya Yoshida			
10	Garbage God's	Rammellzee	Buckethead	Bill Laswell			Grandmixer DXT	Rawthang
11	Babylon Blackout		Buckethead & Otomo Yoshihide	Bill Laswell	Brain	Bernie Worrell		
12	Endtime		Buckethead	Bill Laswell	Brain	Bernie Worrell		
13	Wedge		Buckethead	Bill Laswell	Brain			
14	Subgrid		Buckethead	Bill Laswell	Brain			

=== General credits ===
- Produced and arranged by Bill Laswell
- Created at Orange Music Orange, NJ
- Engineer: Robert Musso
- Assistant: James Dellatacoma
- Drums and Amps/Set up: Artie Smith
- Mastered at Turtle Tone Studio
- Engineer: Michael Fossenkemper
- Front + Back panels: James Koehnline
- Design: John Brown @ cloud chamber
