= DJ Disk =

- Birth name: Luis Quintanilla
- Also known as: PhonosycographDISK, TurntablistDISK
- Born: October 7, 1970 (age 54)
- Origin: San Francisco, U.S.
- Genres: Hip-hop; turntablism; electro
- Occupation: Turntablist
- Instruments: Turntables; phonograph
- Years active: 1992–present
- Labels: Scarecrow music; Oneyedslug Entertainment
- Website: turntablistdisk.com

DJ Disk is a turntablist from the San Francisco Bay Area. He is of Panamanian, Colombian, and Nicaraguan descent. Born Luis Quintanilla on October 7, 1970, in San Francisco, Disk began scratching and mixing vinyl at a young age. In 1992, he joined his long-time friend DJ Qbert among the Rock Steady Crew DJs, later changing the group's name to the Invisibl Skratch Piklz.

As a founding member of the Invisibl Skratch Piklz, Disk has been an enormously influential DJ and is credited with inventing the 2 Click Orbit, the echo fade technique and the 2 Click Flare Lazer Orbit techniques. He was later a founding member of El Stew, which, according to Allmusic, "dealt with the more experimental side of electronic music."

In addition to extensive hip hop work with the Piklz and others, Disk has collaborated with a wide variety of musicians working in other genres, including Herbie Hancock, Bill Laswell, Buckethead, Zakir Hussain, Mike Patton, Norah Jones, Flavor Flav, Rancid, Primus, and Jack DeJohnette. He has been involved in over seventy recordings, and has performed in over fifteen countries. As of 2005, he teaches turntablism in San Francisco. DJ Disk originated the term "turntablist", to differentiate a DJ who plays a role in a band, using the turntable as a musical instrument, from a DJ who mixes and blends vinyl. (see competing claims).

== Discography (partial) ==
- 1997: Marsupial's Belly Flop Breaks with Xtrakd (Scarecrow)
- 1997: Transmutation Live by Praxis
- 1998: Ancient Termites as PhonopsychographDISK
- 1998: Devil Dub by Ben Wa
- 1998: The Shiggar Fraggar Show! by Invisibl Skratch Piklz (five CDs and Videos)
- 1999: Live @ Slim's / Turbulence Chest
- 1999: No Hesitation by El Stew
- 1999: The 13th Scroll by Cobra Strike
- 2000: 149 Ways to Smash Paul Simon's Face Breaks (Stray)
- 2001: PhonopsychographDISK Vs. The Filthy Ape: Mooch Moose (Stray)
- 2001: Warszawa by Praxis
- 2001: Live In San Francisco At Stern Grove by Tabla Beat Science
- 2002: Live by Charged
- 2002: Future 2 Future - Live by Herbie Hancock (DVD)
- 2003: Talamanam Sound Clash by Tabla Beat Science
- 2003: The Rehearsal by El Stew
- 2006: Zurich by Praxis
- 2006: Tornado Urine Breaks (Toolz)

=== Guest appearances ===
- 1995: ...And Out Come the Wolves by Rancid
- 1998: Colma by Buckethead
- 1998: Wave Twisters by DJ Qbert
- 1999: Intonarumori by Material
- 2001: Questside (Untold Tales) by DJ Quest
- 2002: The Album by Latyrx
- 2008: Profanation (Preparation for a Coming Darkness) by Praxis
- 2008: Then And Now: The Definitive Herbie Hancock by Herbie Hancock

=== Compilations ===
- 1996: Altered Beats - Assassin Knowledges Of The Remanipulated (Axiom)
- 1997: Valis II - Everything Must Go (Ion)
- 1999: Planetary Natural Love Gas Webbin' 199999 - Mixed By DJ Pica Pica Pica (Comma)
- 2000: Tektonics (OM Records)
- 2001: Innerhythmic Sound System (Innerhytmic)
- 2002: Scratch (Transparent Music)
