= Dreamatorium =

Studio album by Death Cube K
- Released: May 13, 1994
- Genres: Dark ambient, ambient, experimental
- Length: 42:16
- Label: Strata
- Producer: Buckethead

Death Cube K chronology
Dreamatorium (1994)	Disembodied (1997)

Professional ratings
Review scores
Source	Rating
Allmusic	4/5 stars

Dreamatorium is the first album by American guitarist Buckethead, under the anagram name Death Cube K. The album explores an abstract, ambient-influenced musical style. It was released on May 13, 1994, by Strata (sub-label of Bill Laswell's Subharmonic Records) and again in 1995, including a graphics image generator software by Interactive Multimedia Corporation as the first track. The included software is fractint (version 18.2 for MS-DOS), a freeware fractal generator software that may be obtained as a standalone download from the fractint website free of charge.

== Track listing ==
No.	Title	Length
1.	"Land of the Lost"	10:00
2.	"Maps of Impossible Worlds"	7:13
3.	"Terror by Night"	7:08
4.	"Maggot Dream"	5:07
5.	"Dark Hood"	12:39

== Credits ==
- Buckethead - guitar
- Bill Laswell - bass
- Robert Musso - Engineering (with: Layng Martine)
- John Matarazzo - Realization
- Robert Soares - A&R Coordination
- Norman Saul - System Design
