= Praxis (band) =

American experimental rock band

- Genres: Experimental rock, funk metal, experimental metal, progressive rock, noise rock
- Years active: 1984–2011, 2022
- Labels: Axiom/Island/PolyGram Records, M.O.D. Technologies, Subharmonic, ROIR, Yikes, Innerhythmic
- Past members: Bill Laswell; Buckethead; Brain; Bernie Worrell; Bootsy Collins

Praxis is an experimental rock project, led by producer/bassist Bill Laswell. The band's lineup frequently changed, but guitarist Buckethead and drummer Brain remained stalwarts.

The group collaborated with many other artists such as Serj Tankian from System of a Down, Iggy Pop, DXT and DJ Disk.

== Biography ==
=== Early days ===
Bill Laswell initially used the name Praxis for an experimental solo EP recorded for Celluloid Records in 1984, simply named 1984.

=== 1992–1996 ===
The band's debut album, Transmutation (Mutatis Mutandis), released in 1992, was well received by critics. Praxis was composed of guitarist Buckethead, keyboardist Bernie Worrell, drummer Brain, bassist Bootsy Collins and Afrika Baby Bam as "AF Next Man Flip" on turntables. Bill Laswell masterminded the project and served as producer and co-writer of much of the album's material. Praxis combined elements of different musical genres such as funk, jazz, hip-hop and heavy metal into highly improvised music. The P-Funk-inspired track "Animal Behavior," with a lead vocal from Collins, was released as a single. A video was also shot for the track.

Their next studio album, Sacrifist, was released two years later on the new Laswell-led label Subharmonic and featured a rotating roster of guests including sax player John Zorn and drummer Mick Harris from Painkiller, and members of the band Blind Idiot God. The death metal-influenced album was not as acclaimed as their debut.

The same year saw the album Metatron, with a trio of Buckethead, Laswell and Brain, which included the song "Wake the Dead."

In 1996 the band toured Europe and recorded two live albums called Live in Poland and Transmutation Live containing material from shows in Zürich and Warsaw. Both albums featured members of the Invisibl Skratch Piklz. After the shows, the project broke up.

=== 1997–2004 ===
In 1997, Bill Laswell re-released his Material EP 1984 under the Praxis name. This was followed by the album Mold with Pat Thrall, Peter Wetherbee and Alex Haas instead of Buckethead, Brain and Bernie Worrell respectively. The album was essentially somewhat of a remix album with Wetherbee and crew taking elements from 1984 and crafting a full-length release. Laswell's involvement with this album was minimal. In 1998, Laswell contributed "Dreadnot" to the compilation Abstract Depressionism. Though labeled a Praxis track, this was essentially a solo Laswell creation.

In the same year a first compilation album also containing two songs from the Death Cube K album Dreamatorium (Death Cube K is an anagram of Buckethead) was made available.

In 1999, a re-worked version of Live in Poland was released as Warszawa. Little was heard of the band for the next years, while Brain and Buckethead played for Guns N' Roses and Laswell concentrated more on his dub releases.

=== 2004–2010 ===
Most original members reunited for a small tour in 2004 culminating in their appearance as part of a Bill Laswell themed episode of the PBS series Soundstage. Laswell also began working on their next studio album Profanation (Preparation for a Coming Darkness), but due to the label (Sanctuary) going broke the project was put on hold for about three years.

In 2005 Transmutation Live was re-worked and re-released as Zurich. Another live album called Tennessee 2004 was released in 2007 which was a truncated version of a longer show performed at the Bonnarroo festival.

On 5 April 2005, Laswell performed a 2-hour concert at WTTW Stusios, Chicago with three incarnations of his groups: Tabla Beat Science (with Zakir Hussein, Ustad Sultan Khan, DJ Disk, Karsh Kale, Selim Merchant and Nils Petter Molvaer), Material (with Pharoah Sanders, Foday Musa Suso, Hamid Drake, Aïyb Dieng and Abegasu Shiota) and Praxis (with Buckethead, Brain and Toshinori Kondo), with Bootsy Collins performing MC duties at its climax. An hour long edit was broadcast on the Soundstage series on 13 July 2006.

On January 1, 2008 the studio album Profanation (Preparation for a Coming Darkness) was released in Japan with guest contributions by Serj Tankian, Mike Patton and Iggy Pop as well as Buckethead's old friend Maximum Bob and many more.

=== 2011–present: Hiatus and Sound Virus ===
In early 2011, Profanation was re-released on Bill Laswell's new M.O.D. Technologies label with two additional live tracks. Later that month Bill Laswell stated in an interview that there was likely no more future for the band:

I doubt it. I think they're like closed chapters, but fairly well-documented ones. [...] The same thing goes for Praxis. Buckethead has mostly been performing solo. He also had a health issue recently with his back, so he hasn't been that active. If you want to do something new, there are better things to do than going back to something you did years ago and starting it over.

M.O.D. Technologies also has a vinyl version of Profanation scheduled for an April 2013 release.

In 2015, the band released a new album entitled "Sound Virus".

In 2022, Bill Laswell, Buckethead and Brain returned to the stage as Praxis to play two shows in New York.

== Notable guests ==
The following musicians have contributed to the various Praxis experiments (though arguably, those appearing on "Mold" are not proper collaborators as this album is only tenuously part of the Praxis canon):

- Afrika Baby Bam as AF Next Man Flip on turntables
- Cindy Blackman on drums
- Bootsy Collins on bass and vocals
- DJ Disk on turntables
- DXT on turntables
- Yamatsuka Eye on vocals
- Mick Harris on drums
- Lili Haydn on violin
- Invisibl Skratch Piklz on turntables
- Toshinori Kondo on trumpet
- Maximum Bob on vocals
- Mike Patton on vocals
- Iggy Pop on vocals
- Serj Tankian on vocals
- Pat Thrall on guitars
- John Zorn on saxophone

== Musical styles ==
Praxis is defined by the influences of Laswell and Buckethead. Praxis is an experimental band, both in the studio and during live performances. Their style incorporates elements of Funkadelic, Miles Davis, and Last Exit. It also incorporates influences from hip-hop, heavy metal, funk, jazz fusion, and avant-garde music.

== Discography ==
=== Studio albums ===
- 1992: Transmutation (Mutatis Mutandis)
- 1993: Sacrifist
- 1994: Metatron
- 1998: Mold
- 2008: Profanation (Preparation for a Coming Darkness)

=== Singles ===
- 1992: Animal Behavior

=== EPs and compilations ===
- 1984: 1984
- 1992: A Taste of Mutation
- 1998: Collection
- 2015: Sound Virus

=== Live ===
- 1997: Live in Poland
- 1997: Transmutation Live
- 1999: Warszawa
- 2005: Zurich
- 2007: Tennessee 2004
