= Brain (musician) =

American drummer (born 1963)

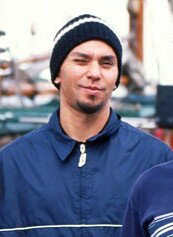
- Brain in a 1998 photo with Primus

Background information
- Born: Bryan Kei Mantia; February 4, 1963 (age 63); Cupertino, California, U.S.
- Genres: Alternative metal; alternative rock; hard rock; funk; punk rock; industrial rock
- Occupation: Drummer
- Instrument: Drums
- Years active: 1984–present
- Formerly of: Primus; Praxis; Godflesh; Guns N' Roses; Colonel Claypool's Bucket of Bernie Brains
- Website: brainarcane.com

Bryan Kei Mantia (Note: Frequently misspelled as "Brian Mantia") (born February 4, 1963), known professionally as Brain, is an American rock drummer. He has played with bands such as Primus, Guns N' Roses, Praxis, and Godflesh, and with other performers such as Tom Waits, Serj Tankian, Bill Laswell, Bootsy Collins, and Buckethead. He has also done session work for numerous artists and bands.

== Early life and education ==
Mantia was born February 4, 1963, in the South Bay city of Cupertino, California, to an Italian American father and a Japanese American mother. As a teenager, Mantia's early influences were James Brown, Jimi Hendrix, Mahavishnu Orchestra and Miles Davis. When he was 16 years old, he started playing drums. At 15, he attended Led Zeppelin's last North American concert ever at the Oakland Coliseum. Because of his 'obsessive' study of the drum book Portraits in Rhythm by Anthony J. Cirone, Mantia was given the nickname "Brain" by members of his high school concert band.

== Musical career ==
Mantia attended the Percussion Institute of Technology in Hollywood, California, during the mid-1980s. During this time, he was a member of local funk-rock band named the Limbomaniacs (which would later become part of Ben Wa). In 1989, Mantia joined Primus briefly, before breaking his foot, forcing him to pull out of the band.

In the early 1990s, he joined Praxis, a musical project led by Bill Laswell and initially featuring Bernie Worrell, Bootsy Collins and Buckethead. The drummer was a mainstay of Praxis for the 1990s, featuring on most of their albums. Mantia recorded with Buckethead on many of Buckethead's solo albums, including Monsters and Robots, Colma, The Cuckoo Clocks of Hell, and Bucketheadland 2, among others.

Sometime in 1995, Mantia was approached by his cousin Kristin Yee, who was managing industrial metal band Godflesh, to join the band as their drummer. He accepted the offer and performed on their 1996 album Songs of Love and Hate as well as Love and Hate in Dub. However, Mantia was unable to commit his time in Europe and left the band the same year. Some time later, Mantia rejoined Primus, touring with (and recording for) four years with the group, appearing on Brown Album, Rhinoplasty and Antipop.

In March 2000, Mantia joined the revamped lineup of Guns N' Roses after being recommended to singer Axl Rose by Buckethead (who himself had joined the band a few months earlier).

In 2003, Mantia appeared on several songs on BT's 2003 release Emotional Technology as well as BT's score for the 2003 film Monster.

In 2004, Mantia toured with Tom Waits on the Real Gone tour.

Mantia toured several legs of the Chinese Democracy Tour with Guns N' Roses from 2000 until 2006, when he left the band to take care of his newborn child. Frank Ferrer, originally brought in as just a replacement drummer for the tour, eventually replaced Mantia as full time drummer for the band. Chinese Democracy was released in 2008, and featured drums from Mantia on every track except the title track. Mantia was also credited with writing the songs "Shackler's Revenge" and "Sorry". Parts of Mantia's drumming on the album were note-for-note re-recordings of Josh Freese's parts, who left the band before Mantia joined. Mantia was also responsible for arrangements on "Shackler's Revenge", "Better", "Street of Dreams", "There Was a Time", "Sorry", "Madagascar", and "Prostitute", initial production on "Shackler's Revenge" and "Sorry", engineering on "Sorry", drum machine and drum programming on "I.R.S." and Logic Pro engineering for the entire album.

Since leaving Guns N' Roses in 2006, Mantia has primarily been focused on music behind the scenes as a composer and producer despite receiving offers to tour with Nine Inch Nails, Korn and System of a Down.

In 2012, Mantia made a guest appearance (alongside fellow former GNR member Robin Finck) at Guns N' Roses' House of Blues West Hollywood show. Mantia played congas on "You're Crazy" and "Rocket Queen". He continued to occasionally work for the band on yet to be released remix material.

Mantia had a brief stint drumming with The Crystal Method in 2013 and 2014 (alongside Guns N' Roses guitarist Richard Fortus). These performances included appearances on Jimmy Kimmel Live!, and Last Call with Carson Daly

In 2017, Mantia toured with Buckethead and Dan Monti as part of Buckethead's live show.

Mantia performed with Primus for the first time in 24 years at the Fox Oakland Theatre on December 30, 2024. However, with Les Claypool and Larry LaLonde auditioning for "the greatest drummer on Earth" in Primus, Mantia did not officially rejoin the band.

== Composing ==
Mantia has partnered with musician Melissa Reese on several projects, a composing team dubbed "Brain and Melissa". In 2010, along with Buckethead, they released the multi-CD sets Kind Regards and Best Regards. Brain and Melissa composed part of the soundtrack to the video game Infamous 2, for which they were nominated for "Outstanding Achievement in Original Composition" by the Academy of Interactive Arts and Sciences awards. Other video games the duo worked on include, Midnight Club 2, PlayStation Home, ModNation Racers, Twisted Metal, Fantasia: Music Evolved and Infamous: Second Son (received the nomination Original Dramatic Score, Franchise at the 2014 NAVGTR Awards, shared with Marc Canham and Nathan Johnson). They also scored the films Detention and Power/Rangers. They have worked with music video director Joseph Kahn on several television commercials, including NASCAR, SEAT, and Qoros. In addition, they scored a commercial for Johnnie Walker Blue which featured a computer-generated Bruce Lee. They also worked on several remixes of songs off of Chinese Democracy for a planned remix album.

The two created a stock music album called "Eclectic Cinema" alongside former Guns N' Roses guitarist Paul Tobias, and Guns N' Roses and Buckethead collaborator Pete Scaturro. Mantia has also worked with Tobias on several other stock music tracks.

The duo performed at the halftime show of a Houston Rockets basketball game on November 10, 2017, performing remixes of "Sorry" and "If the World" from Chinese Democracy, and a cover of Kiss's "Do You Love Me?" from Destroyer.

== Personal life ==
As of 2022, Mantia was living in his hometown Cupertino with a daughter.

== Equipment ==
Information sourced from "Bryan Mantia's Drum setup".

=== Drums ===
DW Collector's Series Maple drums in Tony Williams Yellow Lacquer with Custom Yellow Hardware
18x24 Bass Drum
8x12, 9x13 Toms
16x16, 16x18 Floor Toms w/ Legs
6x14 Edge Snare

9000 Single Bass Drum Pedal
9500 Hi-Hat
9300 Snare Stand
9700 Straight/Boom Cymbal Stand (x6)
9900 Double Tom Stand (x2)
9100 Throne

=== Cymbals ===
Zildjian
14" A Mastersound Hi-Hats
19" A Medium Thin Crash (2)
20" K CrashRide
20" A Deep Ride
20" A Medium Thin Crash
22" Oriental China "Trash"

=== Electronics ===
Akai MPC 60 II, 3000 LE, 4000
Technics SL-1210MKZ Turntables with a M44Gs stylus
Vestax PMCO5PRO DJMixer

== Selected discography and videography ==
- Brain's Lessons: Shredding Repis On the Gnar Gnar Rad – 2002 instructional video
- Brain Has Made the Worst Drum Instructional DVD Ever – 2008 instructional video

Limbomaniacs

- Stinky Grooves – 1990

Opafire

- Without A Trace album, on tracks Crazy Wind; & Hot Melts Ice - 1991

Praxis

- Transmutation – 1992
- Sacrifist – 1994
- Metatron – 1994
- Live in Poland – 1997
- Transmutation Live – 1997
- Warszawa – 1999
- Tennessee 2004 – 2007
- Profanation – 2008

Bullmark

- Interstate '76 soundtrack – 1996

Giant Robot

- Giant Robot – 1996

Godflesh

- Songs of Love and Hate – 1996

Tom Waits

- Bone Machine – 1992
- Mule Variations – 1999
- Real Gone – 2004
- Orphans: Brawlers, Bawlers & Bastards – 2006

Jon Hassell

- Dressing for Pleasure - 1994

Primus

- Brown Album – 1997
- Rhinoplasty – 1998
- Antipop – 1999

Buckethead;

- I Need 5 Minutes Alone (as Pieces) – 1997
- Colma – 1998
- Monsters and Robots – 1999
- The Cuckoo Clocks of Hell – 2004
- Kevin's Noodle House – 2007
- A Real Diamond in the Rough (tracks 2, 4, & 7) – 2009
- Best Regards (with Melissa Reese) – 2010
- Brain as Hamenoodle – 2010
- Kind Regards (with Melissa Reese) – 2010

El Stew

- No Hesitation – 1999

No Forcefield

- Lee's Oriental Massage 415-626-1837 – 2000
- God Is an Excuse – 2001

Colonel Claypool's Bucket of Bernie Brains

- The Big Eyeball in the Sky – 2004

Serj Tankian

- Elect the Dead – 2007
- Imperfect Harmonies (track 10) – 2010

Guns N' Roses

- Chinese Democracy – 2008
- "Absurd" – 2021
- "Hard Skool" – 2021
- "Perhaps" – 2023
- "The General" – 2023
- "Nothin' - 2025
- "Atlas" - 2025

Science Faxtion

- Living on Another Frequency – 2008

Travis Dickerson

- The Dragons of Eden (with Buckethead) – 2008
- Iconography (with Buckethead) – 2009

Video Games

- Cyberpunk 2077 (with Melissa Reese) – 2020
