= Transmutation (Mutatis Mutandis) =

Album by Praxis

Studio album by Praxis
- Released: September 8, 1992
- Genres: Funk metal, experimental rock, dub, alternative metal
- Length: 56:45
- Label: Axiom
- Producer: Bill Laswell

Praxis chronology
Transmutation (Mutatis Mutandis) (1992)	A Taste of Mutation (1992)

Singles from Praxis
- 1. "Animal Behavior" Released: 1992

Professional ratings
Review scores
Source	Rating
AllMusic	4.5/5 stars

Transmutation (Mutatis Mutandis) is the first album by Praxis, an musical ensemble with rotating musicians led by bassist Bill Laswell. The album was released in 1992 and features Buckethead on guitar, Bootsy Collins on bass and vocals, Brain on drums, Bernie Worrell on keyboards and DJ AF Next Man Flip on turntables. Laswell did not perform on this album, but organized the group, produced their recording sessions, and co-wrote much of their material.

Transmutation features a wide range of genres such as heavy metal, funk, hip hop, ambient, jazz and blues, creating a unique style of avant-garde music, with extended guitar and keyboard solos, and highly improvised passages.

The album spawned an EP, A Taste of Mutation, and a single, "Animal Behavior".

== Track listing ==
No.	Title	Length
1.	"Blast/War Machine Dub"	3:51
2.	"Interface/Stimulation Loop"	2:17
3.	"Crash Victim/Black Science Navigator"	3:42
4.	"Animal Behavior"	7:09
5.	"Dead Man Walking"	5:14
6.	"Seven Laws of Woo"	5:05
7.	"The Interworld and the New Innocence"	6:29
8.	"Giant Robot/Machines in the Modern City/Godzilla"	6:38
9.	"After Shock (Chaos Never Died)"	16:20

Note: Track 8 contains an interpolation of the title theme from the Japanese TV series Giant Robot, a rendition of which also featured on Buckethead's Bucketheadland album. The track also features one of the many themes written by Akira Ifukube for the Godzilla films.

== Personnel ==
Personnel as per Discogs.

- Praxis:
  - Bootsy Collins – space bass, vocals
  - Buckethead – guitar, toys
  - Brain – drums
  - Bernie Worrell – synthesizer, clavinet & vital organ
  - AF Next Man Flip (Lord of the Paradox) – turntable, mixer
- Recorded at Greenpoint Studios, Brooklyn, New York
- Conceived and constructed by Bill Laswell
- Robert Musso, Imad Mansour, Paul Berry, Oz Fritz – engineers
- Howie Weinberg – mastering
- Thi Linh Le – art direction, photography
- Aldo Sampieri – design

== A Taste of Mutation EP ==
A Taste of Mutation

EP by Praxis
- Released: 1992
- Recorded: Greenpoint Studio, New York in 1992
- Genres: Avant-garde, experimental rock, experimental metal
- Length: 21:07
- Label: Axiom

Praxis chronology
Transmutation (Mutatis Mutandis) (1992)	A Taste of Mutation (1992)	Sacrifist (1994)

Four song from the album were released as an EP under the title A Taste of Mutation.

== Track listing ==
No.	Title	Length
1.	"Animal Behavior"	7:09
2.	"Dead Man Walking"	5:14
3.	"Crash Victim/Black Science Navigator"	3:42
4.	"Seven Laws of Woo"	5:05

== Animal Behavior single ==
"Animal Behavior"

Single by Praxis

from the album Transmutation (Mutatis Mutandis)
- Released: 1992
- Genre: Funk metal, experimental rock
- Length: 11:44
- Label: Axiom
- Songwriters: Bill Laswell, Buckethead, Bootsy Collins
- Producer: Bill Laswell

"Animal Behavior" was the only single released from the album and was the first and only single released by Praxis. It was chosen as it was the only song of the album to contain lyrics. The vocals were performed by former P-Funk member Bootsy Collins, who also plays "space bass" while his P-Funk colleague Bernie Worrell can be heard on keyboards. Furthermore, the core members, San Francisco Bay Area musicians Brain (drums) and Buckethead (guitars) plus band leader Bill Laswell (samples) were assisted by turntablist Af Next Man Flip (aka Afrika Baby Bam of the Jungle Brothers).

The single includes three different versions of the title track written by Collins, Laswell and Buckethead, an edited album version from Transmutation (Mutatis Mutandis), a short radio edit and a third version that was used for the music video. The original seven-minute album version was also released on the EP A Taste of Mutation in the same year and later included to the Axiom compilation Funkcronomicon in 1995 while the video edit was re-released in 1993 on Manifestation: Axiom Collection II. The song also was included as the last part of the suite "Cosmic Trigger" on the album Axiom Ambient - Lost in the Translation in 1994.

=== Track listing ===
No.	Title	Length
1.	"Animal Behavior (Radio Version)"	2:51
2.	"Animal Behavior (Album Version)"	4:08
3.	"Animal Behavior (Transmutation Video Version)"	4:45

=== Video ===
A video by François Bergeron was released to promote the album and single, featuring the band performing in night vision while fighting against hostile robots and monsters. The video clip was played on MTV's Amp and was included in Buckethead's 2006 DVD Secret Recipe.

=== Personnel ===
- Buckethead: guitar, toys
- Bootsy Collins: space bass, vocals
- Bernie Worrell: synthesizer, clavinet, vital organ
- Af Next Man Flip (Lord of The Paradox): turntable, mixer
- Brain: drums
- Bill Laswell: samples, sounds
- James Koehnline: Cover artist
