= John Carluccio =

American film director

- Born: Teaneck, New Jersey
- Education: Pratt Institute
- Notable work: Battle Sounds: Hip-Hop DJ Documentary, Maurice Hines: Bring Them Back
- Style: Documentary film
- Website: https://cinqua.com/

John Francis Carluccio (born May 14, 1969) is an American filmmaker, artist, and inventor. Carluccio is a two-time Emmy-nominated filmmaker who is best known for documenting obscure pockets of urban society and the creative process.

His documentary project Battle Sounds, is considered to be the first film to document the Turntablism movement in the 1990s. He is the inventor and co-designer of TTM, Turntablist Transcription Methodology, a notation system for DJ scratching.

Carluccio's short films have aired nationally and internationally. In a 20-year span, John created over 500 short films as an on-staff producer/director for TV and digital networks, Current TV, BRIC TV, and Dubspot Music School, and for clients such as W.K. Kellogg Foundation, Native Instruments, and Sozo Artists via his production company, CINQUA.

In 2019, he directed his first feature-length documentary, Maurice Hines: Bring Them Back — Grand Jury Prize Winner (Metropolis) at DOC NYC 2019 and Grand Jury Prize Winner 'Best Documentary" at The American Black Film Festival 2020.

He lives and works in Brooklyn, N.Y., and is married to writer/producer Tracy E. Hopkins.

== Turntablism / Hip-Hop DJing ==
=== Battle Sounds: Hip-Hop DJ Documentary ===
While studying at Pratt Institute in Brooklyn, N.Y., in 1988 Carluccio began frequenting underground DJ battles in New York City. An experimental art student at heart, Carluccio soon became immersed in record collecting, noise collage and scratching. In the summer of 1994, he rallied his friends Rio Valledor, Jon Mark Bagnall and brother Paul Carluccio to begin production on the Battle Sounds: Hip-Hop DJ Documentary.

Battle Sounds was a documentary project recorded primarily from 1994 to 1997. The project captured the grassroots DJ culture movement at a pivotal time in its evolution. Carluccio and his team recorded over 200 hours of material in New York City, Philadelphia, Los Angeles, San Francisco and London. He interviewed over 50 key contributors to the early turntablist scene, including well-known DJs and hip-hop producers DJ Premier, Kid Capri and Pete Rock; underground DJ battle stars DJ QBert, DJ Mix Master Mike, DJ Rob Swift, DJ Roc Raida, DJ Babu, DJ Craze, DJ Quest and DJ 8-Ball; scratch pioneers DJ Grand Wizzard Theodore, DJ Grand Mixer DXT, DJ Jazzy Jeff and DJ Cash Money; and recording artists that many of these DJs sampled heavily, including jazz artist Bob James and rocker Billy Squier.

Pulling from his five-hour rough cut, Carluccio created a 60-minute excerpt reel for Battle Sounds' premiere at the Whitney Museum of American Art Biennial Exhibit. The Battles Sounds: 1997 Whitney Biennial Cut was later released on VHS and distributed at underground record stores. Over the next 20 years, the independent documentary took on a cult following, and was duplicated and shared internationally. Unfortunately, beyond the two versions, “The Whitney Cut” and an earlier VHS release titled X-ersize #1, a film about the X-Men DJ crew, audiences never had the chance to see the full scope of the project.

=== After Battle Sounds ===
Through the Battle Sounds project, Carluccio gained credibility in the DJ community and continued to collaborate with turntablists for many years to come. From 1996 to 2001, he produced The Battle Sounds Turntablist Festival, an open and non-competitive DJ event in New York City. While documenting X-Pressions, the X-Ecutioners’ first studio recording in 1997, Carluccio recognized the need for a musical arrangement and conduction tool. So he designed the first version of TTM, Turntablist Transcription Methodology, a notation system for DJ scratching. In 1998, he co-founded and produced Hop-Fu, a live turntablist scoring of a kung fu film. The project still tours today and has played at film festivals and cultural institutions around the world. In 2001, Carluccio appeared in and was the associate producer for the feature film Scratch. He has photographed the DJ and turntablism scene for magazines, including Vibe, The Fader and Wax Poetics. In more recent years, he has collaborated with DMC Champion DJ Shiftee on a series of videos for Native Instruments, and in 2013 he produced and co-hosted a livestreaming turntablist series titled Stylus Sessions for Dubspot Music School.

=== TTM Inventor ===
In 2001, Carluccio was named by Time Magazine one of the next 100 Innovators in music for his TTM, Turntablist Transcription Methodology. The TTM notation system has aided and elevated the communication and collaboration among DJs, turntablists, musicians and producers. It is the industry standard of musical notation for turntablists worldwide. The TTM booklet created by Carluccio, industrial designer Ethan Imboden and DJ Rae Dawn (Raymond Pirtle) continues to be downloaded and shared, and turntablist enthusiasts have translated versions of the booklet into Italian, French and Spanish.

== Short films ==
=== Independent ===
In 2000, Carluccio directed The Price of Getting Up, a short film that documented the attempted police shutdown of “Street Market," a collaborative installation with graffiti artists Barry McGee, Todd James and Stephen Powers (ESPO) at Deitch Projects in New York City. The film was part of a DVD-zine project titled MOVE that he produced with fellow Brooklyn filmmakers Joey Garfield and Gabor Stibinger. MOVE documented fashion, art, politics and dance, including a rare interview with dance pioneer Don Campbell.

Carluccio has collaborated with artist/designer Ari Saal Forman multiple times, including an experimental sneaker talk-show pilot titled Sneaker Geeks (2003) — featuring Forman, Kenny Meez, ESPO and designers Dee and Ricky. Continuing his work with Forman, in 2010 he released the short film Cease & Desist, aka Ari Can't Talk About It, which explored sneaker collector culture, color trends and copyright infringement when Forman transformed the lively branding of Newport cigarettes into a limited run Nike-like sneaker. The short film premiered at Slamdance in 2010.

=== Current TV, 2006-2009 ===
Carluccio was a producer/editor/shooter for Current TV, a national cable television network and web platform. He licensed over 20 documentary shorts to the network in a three-year span. His films chronicled offbeat, under-recognized creative communities in New York City.

=== BRIC TV, 2009-2011 ===
Carluccio was a staff editor and producer at Brooklyn Independent Television ( later rebranded as BRIC TV). He has produced and/or edited over 100 segments. In 2010, he earned the network its first ever New York Emmy® nomination. He directed a series of artist profile segments that appeared in the network’s Caught in the Act program. In 2016, Carluccio returned to BRIC to produce and direct the arts special All Together Now!, featuring Dan Zanes, Bomba Yo!, The Fillipino Youth Ensemble and Ganesha James. For the project, he earned his second New York Emmy® nomination.

=== Dubspot, 2011-2014 ===
In 2011, Carluccio joined the staff of the electronic music school Dubspot. He served as the head of development and production. At Dubspot, he built and managed a small video team of producers and editors that created educational and inspirational branded content for Dubspot’s YouTube Channel. He executive produced over 400 videos, and co-founded the Dubspot Original Programming arm which created new web series and short documentaries. As the visionary behind Dubspot Original Programming, Carluccio also produced and created Stylus Sessions, an open experimental lab for the new millennium turntablist.

Located in New York City, the school was a popular destination for top EDM producers and musicians, many of whom have appeared in the school’s educational tutorials, artist profiles and Dubspot original programming. Guests have included Nile Rodgers, Adrian Sherwood, Tunde Adebimpe, Mike Huckaby, Orbital, Carl Craig, Pete Tong, Mala, Morton Subotinick, Daddy Kev, Photek, Dubfire, Richie Hawtin, Oddisee, DJ Spinna, Black Coffee, Georgia Anne Muldrow, Steinski, DJ Muggs, RJD2, Beat Junkies, Spectre, Soul Clap, Robert Heneke, Goth-Trad, Salva, Shlohmo, Ital Tek, Nick Francis, Mark De Clive Lowe, King Brit, Jonwayne, High Priest, Naut Humon, Giles Peterrson, Seth Troxler, Ferry Corsten, Chris Liebing, Scientist, Mad Professor, Lee Scratch Perry, A Tribe Called Red, Daedelus, Laura Escudé, and Brandt Brauer Frick.

=== CINQUA | Creative Documentary Agency, 2014-Current ===
In 2014, Carluccio founded CINQUA, a creative documentary company. He has produced and directed projects for W.K. Kellogg Foundation, NYC DOT Art, Smack Mellon Gallery, BRIC Celebrate Brooklyn!, Ableton, Native Instruments, Serato, Roland Corp. Sozo Artists, Pier 36/Basketball City NYC, The Young Vic (UK), and Grammy-winning contemporary gospel artist BeBe Winans.

== Feature Film ==
=== Maurice Hines: Bring Them Back, 2019 ===
In 2019, Carluccio directed the award-winning documentary feature film, Maurice Hines: Bring Them Back, an intimate portrait of overlooked elder song-and-dance man Maurice Hines. At the prestigious DOC NYC film festival in 2019, the film won the Metropolis competition Grand Jury Prize for outstanding New York City stories, and received a glowing review in The Hollywood Reporter. In 2020, the film was the Grand Jury Prize Winner 'Best Documentary" at The American Black Film Festival 2020.

== Awards and honors ==
- 2010 New York Emmy Nomination - Producer, Arts Specials
- 2017 New York Emmy Nomination - Producer, Arts Specials
- 2019 Grand Jury Winner DOC NYC (Metropolis)
