= Turntablist transcription methodology =

Turntablist Transcription Methodology, or TTM, is a notation system for scratching and turntablism. The system was founded by John Carluccio in 1997. A booklet detailing the system was written and published by John Carluccio, industrial designer Ethan Imboden and Raymond Pirtle (DJ Raedawn) in 2000. It is an intuitive graphical representation of the movement of a record whilst performing with a turntable, and was originally documented in a booklet form for distribution used by turntablists around the world.

The system has achieved acclaim from a number of recognizable turntablists, and is becoming increasingly accepted as a valuable method for transcribing turntablist music as it used by public schools in the UK, as well as DJ schools, and has appeared in numerous university dissertations. Thousands of DJ techniques, tutorials and musical scores have been transcribed using this system.

The TTM musical notation system has aided in the communication and collaboration among DJs, turntablists, musicians and producers. It has been recognized as the industry standard of musical notation for turntablists worldwide. The TTM system is used by renowned DJ instructors at Electronic Music Collective, Scratch DJ Academy, School of Scratch, The Beat Junkies Institute of Sound, and Q-bert’s Skratch University.

== TTM origins ==
While documenting the X-ecutioners first studio recording X-pressions, John Carluccio envisioned the notation system in 1997 and started testing his rough concept with DJ Rob Swift and turntablists. In 1998 he partnered with industrial designer Ethan Imboden to create a TTM booklet, and by 2000, with additional aid from DJ Raedawn (Raymond Pirtle), a full detailed booklet was distributed at The Battle Sounds Turntablist Festival #4 at New City’s Symphony Space on February 17, 2000. The TTM booklet has been downloaded, shared, and translated versions in Italian, French, Spanish have been created by turntablist enthusiasts. In 2001, John Carluccio was named by Time Magazine as one of the next 100 Innovators in music for TTM. TTM appeared in Scratch movie and dvd extras in 2001. In 2004, Scratch Magazine (issues #1- #6) featured TTM notations in a reoccurring column that explained iconic hip-hop scratch patterns. In 2022, Carluccio spoke at the Sample Music Festival in Berlin about the origins of TTM.
