= Scratch (soundtrack) =

Soundtrack album by Various Artists
- Released: February 12, 2002
- Genre: Turntablism, hip hop
- Label: Transparent Music

Scratch is the soundtrack to the 2001 documentary Scratch directed by Doug Pray. Scratch examines cultural and historical perspectives on the birth and evolution of hip-hop disc jockeys (DJs), scratching and turntablism and includes interviews with some of hip-hop's most famous and respected DJs.

== Track list ==
1. "Prologue - Grand Wizard Theodore Speaks" (Grand Wizard Theodore)
2. "Mixmaster Mike and DJ Disk Live" (Mix Master Mike, DJ Disk)
3. "Primo's X-Ecution" (X-Ecutioners feat. DJ Premier)
4. "Re-Animator" (Rob Swift)
5. "Interlude - Mixmaster Mike Speaks" (Mix Master Mike)
6. "Rockit 2.002" (Herbie Hancock, feat. Mix Master Mike, Grandmixer DXT, Rob Swift, Q-Bert, Babu, Faust, Shortee)
7. "Interlude - Cut Chemist" (Cut Chemist)
8. "Turntable Transformer" (Cat Five VS Snake Eyez)
9. "Interlude - Interlude"
10. "DJ Krush - Live" (DJ Krush)
11. "Crazy 2 Crazy" (Grandmixer DXT)
12. "Interlude - DJ Shadow Speaks" (DJ Shadow)
13. "Invasion of the Octopus People" (Invisibl Skratch Piklz)
14. "Interlude - Jazzy Jay and Afrika Bambaataa Speak" (Jazzy Jay, Afrika Bambaataa)
15. "All 4 One" (Boogie Boy, Kidd Delight, Afrika Bambaataa)
16. "Interlude - Afrika Bambaataa Speaks Again" (Afrika Bambaataa)
17. "Skin Cracked Canals" (DJ Disk)
18. "Interlude - Interlude"
19. "Cut Transmitter" (Grandmixer DXT)
20. "Universal Noize Maker" (Eddie Def)
21. "Interlude - Q-Bert and Mixmaster Mike Speak" (Q-Bert, Mix Master Mike)
22. "My Style" (Rob Swift)
