= TTM =

TTM may refer to:

== Business and finance ==
- Ticket symbol for Tata Motors formerly traded on the New York Stock Exchange, delisted in 2023
- Telegraphic transfer middle rate, an exchange rate convention in Japan
- Televiziunea Târgu-Mureș, a Romanian local television station
- Thailand Tobacco Monopoly, a state enterprise in Thailand
- Time to market, the length of time it takes from a product being conceived to its being available for sale
- Trailing twelve months, the most-recent year of financial results
- TTM Technologies, an American printed circuit board manufacturer

== Science and medicine ==
- Targeted temperature management, therapeutic interventions to maintain a person's temperature at a specific value
- Traditional Tibetan medicine
- Transtheoretical model of change, a concept in health psychology
- Trichotillomania, a disorder characterized by the urge to pull out one's hairs
- Two temperature model, a model in statistical mechanics that describes ultrafast carrier relaxation dynamics

== Other uses ==
- Talk to Me (2022 film), an Australian horror film
- Texas Transportation Museum
- The Three Musketeers, a novel by Alexandre Dumas
- Todos Tus Muertos, an Argentine rock music group
- Tshakhuma Tsha Madzivhandila F.C., a South African professional football club
- TTM (programming language)
- Tun Tun Min, Burmese Lethwei fighter
- Turntablist transcription methodology, a musical notation system for scratching and turntablism
