= Jean-Philippe Chainiaux =

Belgian DJ AKA Dopefish and System-D

Dopefish System-D
- Born: Jean-Philippe Chainiaux; Belgium
- Genres: Electro house; drum and bass; Baile funk; fidget house; hip hop; Miami bass; grime; dubstep
- Occupations: Disc jockey; music producer; remixer
- Years active: 1992–present
- Labels: Big Alliance Records; Dopefish AUDIO; Y4K
- Website: www.dopefish-audio.com www.djsystemd.com

Jean-Philippe Chainiaux, stage name Dopefish or DJ Dopefish, also known by the name DJ System-D or System-D in drum and bass music; is a Belgian DJ, performing in the electronic, dance, hip-hop, and drum and bass scenes.

As well as producing his own records, he has released numerous CDs with his own remixes of other songs.

== Music style and genre ==
He is known for his wide-ranging sets that include everything from breaks, electro house, baile funk, and fidget house to hip-hop, Miami bass, grime, and dubstep. He is a fan of scratch and turntablism, and currently plays most of the time on 3 or 4 turntables.

== Career ==
He began his career in his native Belgium in 1992, starting out as an ordinary DJ, having been playing around with his vinyls when he was just 15 years old. Passionate about hip-hop and DJing techniques, in 1994, he discovered jungle music. At the beginning of 1996 he started playing only jungle and drum and bass and in that same year he began hosting radio shows in Brussels at Action FM.

After that the number of his performances increased significantly all over Europe, becoming a regular at famous clubs in Belgium such as Fuse (Brussels), Tour de l'Est (Antwerp), La Chapelle (Liège), and playing at big festivals such as Pukkelpop (in 2003), 10Days Of Techno, Tomorrowland, Groove City, Dour Festival, Antwerp is Burning, Star Warz, and It's Like A Jungle.

In 1998, under the name System-D, he won the "Drum & Bass Arena" mixtape competition. That same year he was crowned "Best DJ" (excl. UK) by the legendary British magazine Knowledge.

In 2000, he decided to begin promoting the INSIDE events. Later he organized other events like Volume, Organic, Warning, and Body Movin'.

System-D signed on Intercom Rec. in 2004 (E-Z Rollers, UK) for whom he released a few 12", and also appeared on the New Skool Blazers LP. He collaborated on the D&B album of the New-Yorkean MC Jamalski (BDP/KRS-One).

He set up his own label Dopefish A.U.D.I.O in 2007 but is also currently signed with Big Alliance Records.

== Discography ==
=== As "Dopefish" ===
==== Albums ====
Title	Label	Year released
Chemtrails	G Point Muzik	2009

==== Singles and EPs ====
Title	Label	Year released
Hippocampus Invasion	Dopefish Audio	2007
Big Bad Wolf	Y4K Recordings	2009
Housecalls	Y4K Recordings	2009
The Wasp EP	Hooj Choons	2011

==== Remixes, mash-ups and other releases ====
Title	Label	Year released
Disco d'Or	Dopefish Audio	2008
Police In Helicopter	Dopefish Audio	2009
Who Remixed Who?	Dopefish Audio	2009
Must Be The Music	Dopefish Audio	2009
Stop The Prophet	Dopefish Audio	2010
Drop That Ghetto Blaster	Dopefish Audio	2010
Yardcore	Dopefish Audio	2010
Django!	Dopefish Audio	2010
Galley Slaves	Dopefish Audio	2011
Dogz!	Dopefish Audio	2011

=== As "System-D" ===
==== Singles and EPs ====
Title	Label	Year released
Black Magic	Dance Opera	1994
II	Dance Opera	1994
Airborn Vol. I (feat. Licata)	Zolex Records	1996
Pressure	Zolex Records	1997
Here's The Power / Odysseus	New Skool Blazers	2004
We Control / Ruff (feat. MC Jamalski)	New Skool Blazers	2005

==== Music videos ====
Song Title	Details	Year released
The Lights Go Down (Radio Edit)	Director by Stéphane Saint-Remy; Assistant: Johan Cammaerts; Photography: Jean Mahaux; Dancers: La Family	2013
