= System D (disambiguation) =

System D or Système D is a person's ability to adapt quickly and improvise to solve problems.

System D or systemd may also refer to:

- systemd, a computer startup system for Linux
- Système D, an album by Les Rita Mitsouko
- System-D, the Belgian DJ Jean-Philippe Chainiaux
- CCIR System D, an analog TV broadcast system used in mainland China and the former USSR

== See also ==
- Black market
