= Demolition Pumpkin Squeeze Musik =

Compilation album by DJ Q-bert
- Released: 1994
- Genre: Mixtape

Demolition Pumpkin Squeeze Musik is a mixtape by DJ Q-bert. It was released in 1994, one year before he invented the "crab scratch." The samples on this album come from bands (including Rush), cartoons (Racketeer Rabbit, Ren & Stimpy, The Huckleberry Hound Show), comic books (including Spider-Man), video games (including Street Fighter II), and movies (including The Warriors and Style Wars). The mix also contains many classic examples of hip hop break (music) with heavy scratching over top.

== The Breaks ==
Track	Artist	Title
1	Rush	Tom Sawyer
	Eddie Bo	Hook & Sling Pt. 1
	Bill Withers	Kissin' My Love
	The Chubukos	House of the Rising Funk
	Bob James	Take Me to Mardi Gras
	Rufus Thomas	Do the Funky Penguin Pt. 2
	7th Wonder	Daisy Lady
	Galactic Force Band	Space Dust
2	Galactic Force Band	Space Dust
	James Brown	Funky President (People It's Bad)
	Dexter Wansel	Theme from the Planets
	Rhythm Heritage	Theme from "S.W.A.T."
	The Brothers Johnson	Ain't We Funkin' Now
	Esther Williams	Last Night Changed It All
3	The Jackson 5	It's Great To Be Here
	Lowell Fulson	Tramp
4	Lonnie Liston Smith	Expansions
	The Grass Roots	You and Love are the Same
	Lafayette Afro Rock Band	Congas
5	Dennis Coffey	Ride Sally Ride
	Yellow Sunshine	Yellow Sunshine
	Fred Wesley and The J.B.'s	Blow Your Head
6	Incredible Bongo Band	Apache
7	Jackie Robinson	Pussyfooter
	ESG	U.F.O.
	Fab 5 Freddy	Down By Law
8	Gary Numan	Films
	The Headhunters	God Made Me Funky
9	The Honey Drippers	Impeach the President
	Funk, Inc.	Kool is Back
	Ike White	Love and Affection
	The Five Stairsteps	Don't Change Your Love
	?	?
	?	?
	Lamont Dozier	Take Off Your Makeup
	Rusty Bryant	Fire Eater
	Roy Ayers	Boogie Back
10	Roy Ayers	Boogie Back
	Bo Diddley	Hit or Miss
	Roxanne Shanté	The Def Fresh Crew
	Black Heat	Zimba Ku
	The Wild Magnolias	Soul, Soul, Soul
	Banbarra	Shack Up
11	Juice	Catch a Groove
	Dennis Coffey	Son of Scorpio
	Cecil Holmes Soulful Sounds	2001 (Also Sprach Zarathustra)
	The Magic Disco Machine Band	Scratchin'
	John Davis and the Monster Orchestra	I Can't Stop
	Pleasure	Let's Dance
12	James Brown	Give It Up or Turnit a Loose (Remix)
	The Blackbyrds	Rock Creek Park
	Wild Sugar	Bring It Here
	Brother Soul	Cookies
13	Alphonse Mouzon	You Don't Know How Much I Love You
	Alphonse Mouzon	Space Invaders
	Bobby Byrd	I Know You Got Soul
	Z. Z. Hill	I Think I'd Do It
14	The Greyboy Allstars	Tenor Man
	Coke Escovedo	(Runaway) I Wouldn't Change a Thing
15	The Greyboy Allstars	Let the Music Take Your Mind
16	James Brown	Soul Pride Pt. 1
	Too Short	Freaky Tales
