= Love, Lizzo =

- Release poster
- Directed by: Doug Pray
- Produced by: Doug Pray; Stephanie Meurer; Kevin Beisler; Kevin Weaver; Ryan Kroft; Nicole Rocklin
- Starring: Lizzo
- Production companies: Live Nation Productions; Boardwalk Pictures; Warner Music Entertainment; Atlantic Films; Diamond Docs
- Distributed by: HBO Max (United States); Binge (Australia)
- Release dates: November 24, 2022 (United States); November 25, 2022 (Australia)
- Running time: 92 minutes
- Countries: United States; Australia
- Language: English

Love, Lizzo is an American documentary film directed by Doug Pray and featuring American singer Lizzo. It was released through HBO Max on November 24, 2022.

== Synopsis ==
An official press from HBO Max stated, "the journey of a trailblazing superstar who has become the movement the world desperately needed just by being herself. The HBO Max documentary shares the inspirational story behind her humble beginnings to her meteoric rise with an intimate look into the moments that shaped her hard-earned rise to fame, success, love and international stardom."

== Production ==
On May 18, 2022, Lizzo announced and showed a teaser at the Madison Square Garden that she will have a documentary with HBO Max. It was also announced that Doug Pray will direct and produce the upcoming documentary, with Lizzo as an executive producer through her production company, Lizzobangers.

Initially the project was set to be directed by Sophia Nahli Allison, who later departed the project after two weeks alleging Lizzo's behavior towards her was rude and arrogant.

== Promotion ==
Love, Lizzo was made available through HBO Max on November 24, 2022. The documentary was also made available through the Australian streaming service, Binge. In the UK, the documentary film was released on BBC iPlayer on June 3, 2023.
