= Pony (brand) =

American footwear and clothing brand

PONY
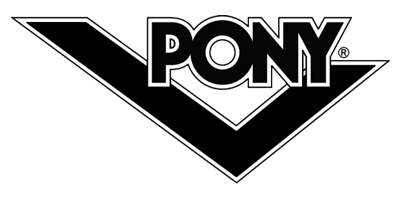
- Product type: Footwear, clothing
- Current owner: Iconix Brand Group
- Country: United States
- Introduced: 1972; 54 years ago
- Markets: Worldwide
- Website: pony.com

PONY is an American brand of footwear and clothing headquartered in New York City under the company name PONY International. It was acquired by Iconix Brand Group in 2015.

== History ==
Founded in 1972 on Madison Avenue in New York City, PONY was created by Uruguayan-born industry veteran Roberto Muller, along with financing provided by Adidas Chairman Horst Dassler. The company's name is an acronym for Product of New York. During the late 1970s and early 1980s, Pony became one of the top athletic brands worldwide. By the mid-1980s, PONY's sales volume reached US$800 million. The Pony brand has been worn by championship athletes in every major sport, including the FIFA World Cup, the NFL's Super Bowl, the CFL's Grey Cup, MLB's World Series, and the NBA Finals, as well as boxers, most notably Buster Douglas on the night of his epic defeat of then-undefeated heavyweight champion Mike Tyson.

PONY was owned by the English-based company Pentland in the 1990s before a sale to The Firm entertainment group, based in Santa Monica, California. The Firm relaunched the brand in 2001 with celebrity entertainers including Justin Timberlake, Korn, Snoop Dogg and Paris Hilton.

In 2003, Global Brand Marketing, based in Santa Barbara, California, acquired a majority share of PONY, along with Symphony Holdings and Itochu Corporation. In 2006, PONY was purchased by Symphony Holdings, a public company based in Hong Kong. Symphony brought in former partner Infinity Associates, who together purchased Converse from bankruptcy in 2001 and Haggar Clothing in 2005. Jim Stroesser, who was the key partner in rebuilding Converse, was asked to be the CEO/President of PONY in 2006. Stroesser's team relocated Pony from Santa Barbara, California, to downtown San Diego. In 2010 the company's U.S. headquarters were moved to Los Angeles.

In February 2015, US corporation Iconix Brand Group acquired rights to the brand "PONY" from Symphony Holdings for US$ 37 million. Iconix acquired rights to North America, retaining option to expand global ownership. Iconix partnered Anthony L&S Athletics to carry out the purchase.

== Sponsorships ==
Athletes sponsored by PONY included Pelé, Dan Marino, Bob McAdoo, Nick Galis, Earl Campbell, Franco Harris, Lawrence Taylor, Willie Stargell, Reggie Jackson, Pete Rose, David Thompson, Spud Webb, Darryl Dawkins, Wilson Chandler, and Paolo Rossi. The PONY brand has a strong heritage in boxing, endorsing Muhammad Ali, George Foreman, Larry Holmes, and Leon Spinks.

Collaborations includes 5Preview, Applebum, Art Comes First, Colette (boutique), Dee and Ricky, Foot Patrol, Ricky Powell, JackThreads, Mark McNairy, Michael Michalsky, Ronnie Fieg, Rothco, The Smiley Company, UBIQ and Ricardo Pérez.

Originally PONY was known for producing athletic shoes. The company expanded its offerings to include sports clothing, producing streetwear. As a result, PONY has partnered with and been endorsed by non-athlete celebrities including Snoop Dogg, who in 2005 launched his Doggybiscuitz range.

In sportswear, PONY also designed several football kits since the 1990s, including clubs such as Oldham Athletic, Huddersfield Town, Dundee United, West Ham United, Hearts, Motherwell, Tottenham Hotspur, Coventry City, Southampton, Luton Town and Norwich City, Chile's Colo Colo, India's East Bengal, Mexico's Puebla, Club León, and Santos Laguna, among others.

PONY designed the kit for Paris Saint-Germain F.C. in 1977. PONY in the 1990s signed a Long Complexing brand deal trust with the Royal Spanish Football Federation for supplies any regional and territorial federations, comprising the different Autonomous communities and cities since 1994 (until 2000 years. PONY's endorsements include NFL star Randy Moss, who had his own line of American football cleats developed. In basketball, PONY signed a deal with the American Basketball Association (ABA) in 2007, becoming the official shoe provider for all ABA players.
