= DJ Steve Dee =

American disc jockey

DJ Steve Dee is a disc jockey and the creator of "The Funk" known to the world as beat juggling. Steve Dee was the founding member of the original DJ group "The X-Men" (today known as the X-Ecutioners) and helped to establish turntablism. DJ Steve Dee has worked with artists such as:

- Doug E. Fresh & the Get Fresh Crew
- Luther ‘Luke Skywalker a.k.a. Uncle Luke Campbell
- Wreckx-N-Effect
- Japanese R & B singer Toshinobu Kubota
- Teddy Riley’s “Guy & BlackStreet”
- Michael Jackson on the album Dangerous

In 2000 Dee was inducted into the DMC DJ Hall of Fame for his contributions to the world of deejaying. He also won the 1990 New Music Seminar DJ Battle for World Supremacy and placed second in the 1991 DMC US Finals. He co-starred in the DJ documentary Scratch.
