= Wave Twisters =

2001 American animated film

- DVD cover
- Directed by: Eric Henry; Syd Garon
- Screenplay by: Doug Cunningham; Syd Garon; Eric Henry
- Story by: DJ Q-Bert
- Produced by: Yogafrog
- Edited by: Rodney Ascher; Kim Bica; Syd Garon; Eric Henry; Carol Lynn Weaver
- Music by: DJ Q-Bert
- Distributed by: Thud Rumble
- Release date: January 23, 2001 (Sundance Film Festival)
- Running time: 46 minutes
- Country: United States
- Language: English
- Budget: $250,000

Wave Twisters is a 2001 American animated film directed by Eric Henry and Syd Garon and based on DJ Q-Bert's album of the same name. It is known as the first turntablism-based musical. It is a mix of live-action, computer graphics, and cel animation.

== Plot ==
A crew of heroes is determined to save the lost arts of hip hop: break dancing, graffiti, MCing, and DJing from total extinction. The lost arts are being oppressed throughout inner-space by lord Ook and his evil minions the Chinheads. DJ and dentist The Dental Commander, graffiti artist Honey Drips, robotic MC Rubbish, and breakdancer Grandpa have a series of adventures, synchronized to the music. Armed with the ancient relic known as the Wave Twister (a small turntable/wristwatch, the only weapon powerful enough to defeat the enemies), they travel to the far ends of inner-space for a final confrontation with the sinister army of oppressors. The film ends with the team teaching the liberated the lost fundamentals of hip hop.

== Cast ==
- DJ Q-Bert as Darth Fader
- Yogafrog as Turbo Frog
- D-Styles as Wax Fondler
- Flare as Butchwax
- Buckethead as himself

== Production ==
The film is entirely scripted to match the DJ Q-Bert recording. It was produced digitally using Adobe After Effects and a relatively small team of animators, who used Apple PowerMac G3 computers. The film spent three years in production. DJ Q-Bert wanted to make videos for his music without sacrificing his street influences. At the same time, he wanted to highlight the underground elements in hip hop culture. Sources for the images used in the film include NASA and old cartoons. Other influences include Shaft, Star Trek, Bullitt, and Lost in Space.

== Release ==
The film has had several different premieres, each of which debuted a new cut of the film. After the showing at Sundance Film Festival, DJ Q-Bert self-distributed the film and released it on home video without any copy protection.

== Reception ==
Vibe called it "a Saturday-morning cartoon gone street". Dennis Harvey of Variety wrote, "A dazzling sensory-overload goof, animated featurette Wave Twisters pays parodic homage to sci-fi actioners in terms as densely layered as its visual and sonic textures." Harvey states that more staid audiences may not get the film, but it will appeal highly to the MTV generation.
