= DJ Cash Money =

American hip hop DJ

- Born: Jerome Hewlett; August 9, 1964 (age 61)
- Origin: Philadelphia, Pennsylvania, U.S.
- Genres: Hip hop
- Occupation: DJ
- Instrument: Turntable
- Label: Sleeping Bag
- Website: Official MySpace

Jerome Hewlett (born August 9, 1964), better known by his moniker DJ Cash Money is a Philadelphia-based American turntablist, hip-hop artist, and record producer. He was the first inductee into the DJ Hall of Fame.

== Career ==
Hewlett studied engineering at college, but soon shifted his focus to the turntables. He adopted his DJ moniker from the phrase "there's the money shot", which people would yell whenever he threw the ball into the net while playing basketball. Among his inspirations Cash Money lists Grandmaster Flash and Grand Wizzard Theodore, whom he saw in the early 1980s, while artists who count him among their own inspirations include British DJ Fatboy Slim.

He and Jazzy Jeff both emerged from the Philadelphia hip hop scene in the late 1980s. They shared a friendly rivalry and DJ'd parties together as the Kings of Spin. Cash Money perfected the Transform scratch (along with Jazzy Jeff) which mimicked the robotic sound effects from the mid-80s television cartoon series of the same name. He is also credited with creating the Pee Wee Herman scratch and pioneering the Chirp scratch (aka the Babuggamas scratch).

In 1987, he partnered with MC Marvelous (born Marvin Berryman) and released the single "Ugly People be Quiet" (co-produced by Herbie "Love Bug" Azor) and the album, Where's The Party At? on Sleeping Bag Records. Cash Money has also produced and remixed tracks for artists such as Snoop Dogg, Busta Rhymes, Mantronix, P.M. Dawn, and Public Enemy.

== Accomplishments ==
Cash Money won the New Music Seminar Supermen DJ Battle in 1987 and the DMC World DJ Championships in 1988.

In 1998, turntable manufacturer Technics made Cash Money the first inductee into the DJ Hall of Fame.

== Discography ==
=== Cash Money and Marvelous ===
Albums

Year	Album	US
Year	Album	Hip-hop
1988	Where's The Party At?	26

Singles

Year	Title	US	UK	Album
Year	Title	Rap	UK Singles Chart	Album
1987	"Play It Kool" / "Ugly People Be Quiet"	—		Where's The Party At?
1988	"Find An Ugly Woman" / "The Mighty Hard Rocker"	11	84	Where's The Party At?
1989	"A Real Mutha For Ya" / "New Sheriff In Town"	—		Where's The Party At?

=== DJ Cash Money mix tapes ===
- Old School Need Ta Learn'o Plot I
- W.K.I.S. Holiday Head Twister
- Kickin Flava
- Freestyle Flavor
- Guess Who's Comin' To Dinner? (1996)
- Old School Need Ta Learn'o Plot II (1997)
- Head Bangin' Funk 45's (2005)
