= Beat juggling =

DJing and turntablism technique

Beat juggling is a deejaying and turntablism technique in which two records are used to prolong an existing beat, or to create a new one. It is associated with the context of hip hop, but not necessarily limited to this genre.

== Definition ==
Beat juggling can be defined as the art of manipulating two or more samples (e.g. drum beats, or vocal phrases), in order to create a unique composition, using multiple turntables and one or more mixers. This can involve pauses, scratching, backspins and delays. It could be seen as fingertip sampling, and the turntable and mixer combination could be seen as an instrument from which sounds are made, from the sounds of other instruments (samples).

Despite being a classical technique in deejaying and turntablism, beat juggling isn't limited to analogue mixing with vinyl records. It can also be achieved by digital means using Compact Disc DJ players or DJ controllers.

== History ==
Beat juggling has its roots in cutting, in which a small section of a beat is looped using two copies of the same record. DJ Steve Dee as one of the earliest innovators in the mid-1980s. The technique gained widespread popularity beginning in 1990.

== Techniques ==
- Looping
- Strobing
- Body Moves
- Carousel
