= Doug Pray =

American film director

Doug Pray is an American documentary film director, producer, editor, and cinematographer who often explores subcultures in his films.

In January, 2024, Turner Classic Movies (TCM) released a 6-part series, The Power of Film, featuring Pray's former teacher and mentor, UCLA Professor Howard Suber. The series, which is also streamed on Max's TCM Hub, explores the inner workings of America's most popular and memorable films. Pray served as executive producer, supervising editor, and writer.

Pray's prior work as director includes Love, Lizzo, a documentary film released by HBO Max on November 24, 2022, about the singer, rapper, and flute player, her rise to fame, and her journey toward self-acceptance, as well as two art-related films: Levitated Mass (2013), a film about the creation of Michael Heizer's massive sculpture at the Los Angeles County Museum of Art, and the Emmy Award-winning Art & Copy, a film about advertising and creativity that premiered at the 2009 Sundance Film Festival, which was distributed by PBS.

Pray also directed Surfwise (2008), a portrait of the nomadic, 11-member Doc Paskowitz family (often referred to as the "first family of surfing"); Big Rig (2008), a documentary about truck drivers; Infamy (2005), a documentary about graffiti culture; Red Diaper Baby (2004), a solo-performance film starring Josh Kornbluth; Scratch (2001), a documentary about turntablism and DJ culture; and his first feature, Hype! (1996), a documentary about the explosion and exploitation of the Seattle grunge scene of the early 1990s. Hype! and Scratch both premiered at the Sundance Film Festival (1996 and 2001), and are often ranked among the best music docs of all time.

From 2014 to 2017, Pray was executive producer, writer, and editor of the four-part HBO docuseries The Defiant Ones, directed by Allen Hughes, which chronicles the legendary careers and partnership of music producers Dr. Dre and Jimmy Iovine. It premiered in the U.S. on July 9, 2017, and was nominated for 5 Emmy Awards, won Best Limited Series at the International Documentary Association (IDA) Awards, and won the 2018 Grammy Award for Best Music Film.

Pray's work with Allen Hughes led to his being asked in 2023 to help executive produce the three-part Netflix series about Arnold Schwarzenegger, Arnold. Prior to that, Pray executive produced the first season of the AppleTV+ series Home, for which he directed two episodes, as well as the Dave Grohl series From Cradle to Stage (Paramount+).

In addition to his documentary and series work, Pray has directed a number of nonfiction-style commercials and commissioned short films for such brands as Guinness, Adidas, Toyota, and Doc Martins. In 2006, he won an Emmy Award for an advocacy campaign for HIV/AIDS awareness.

Pray was born in Denver, CO and grew up in Madison, WI. He has a BA in sociology from Colorado College and an MFA from UCLA's School of Film and Television. He is a member of the Directors Guild of America and the Academy of Motion Picture Arts and Sciences. He lives in Los Angeles with his wife, Diana Rathe Pray, with whom he has two children.

== Filmography (director) ==
- Hype! (1996)
- Scratch (2001)
- Sundance 20 (2002)
- Veer (2004)
- Red Diaper Baby (2004)
- Infamy (2005)
- Big Rig (2008)
- Surfwise (2008)
- Art & Copy (2009)
- Levitated Mass (2013)
- Love, Lizzo (2022)
