= DJ Qbert =

American DJ (born 1969)

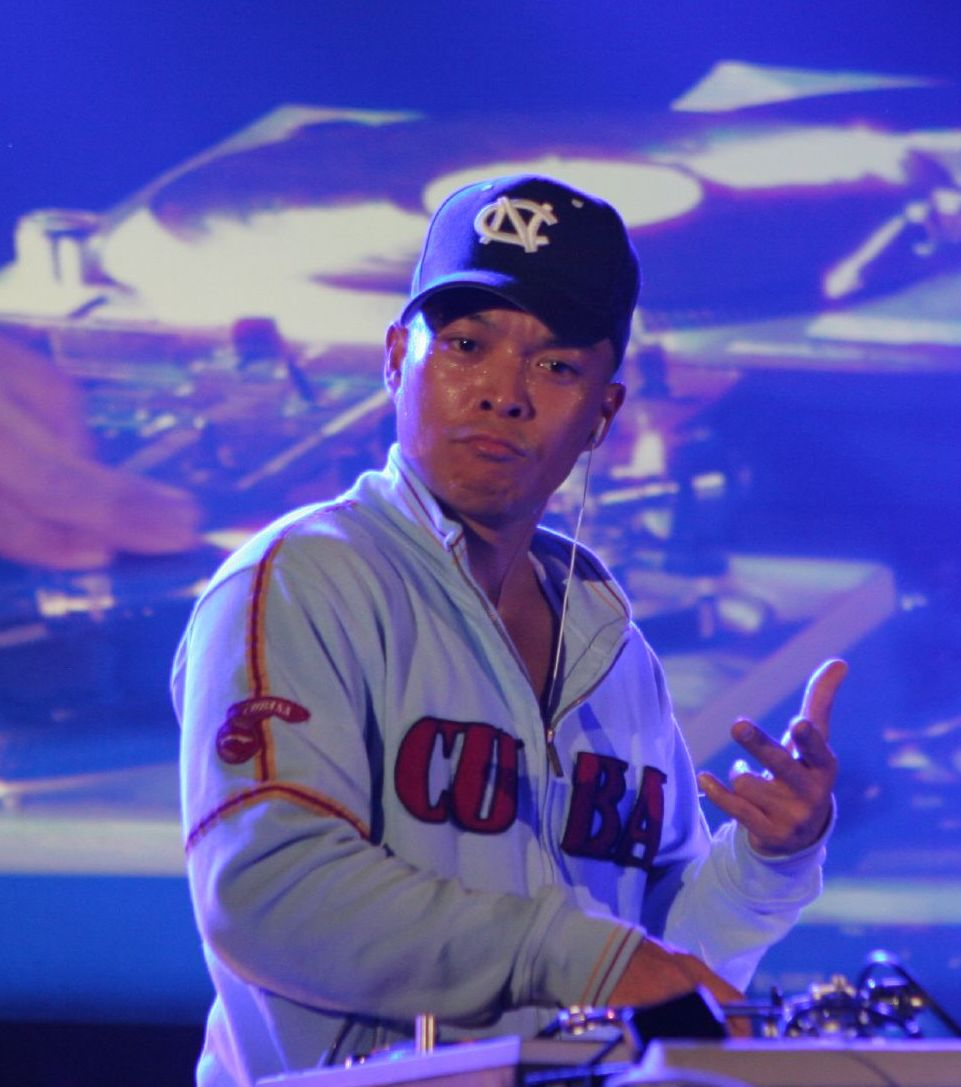
- Qbert performing in 2006

Background information
- Born: Richard Quitevis; October 7, 1969 (age 57); San Francisco, California, US
- Genres: Hip hop; psychedelic rap; turntablism
- Occupations: Disc jockey, composer
- Years active: 1990–present
- Website: djqbert.com

Richard Quitevis (born October 7, 1969) known by his stage name DJ Qbert or Qbert, is a turntablist and composer who has heavily influenced the history of DJing. He was awarded America's Best DJ in 2010, was DMC USA Champion 1991 (solo) and achieved titles as DMC World Champion in 1992 and 1993.

== Early life ==
Richard Quitevis was born on October 7, 1969, to parents hailing from the Philippines. Growing up in San Francisco's Excelsior District on Moscow Street, he graduated from Luther Burbank Middle School and in 1987 from Balboa High School. Qbert started playing with records at the age of 15, although he got his first Fisher-Price turntable as a toddler. He was influenced by the street performers and graffiti artists of the local hip hop community in the mid-1980s. Balboa's school cafeteria is where he first met Mix Master Mike in a DJ battle; the two have been good friends ever since.

== Career ==
Qbert started his musical career in a group called FM20 with Mix Master Mike and DJ Apollo in 1990. In New York City when playing a show, FM20 was spotted by Crazy Legs, who invited them to join the Rock Steady Crew. They accepted the offer to join the crew. Going by the name Rock Steady DJs, they then proceeded to take the 1992 Disco Mix Club World DJ Championships (DMC) world title. Qbert was also one of the founding members of the band Invisibl Skratch Piklz. Although there were other turntablist crews before the Invisibl Skratch Piklz, the Skratch Piklz were the first to apply the band concept to turntablism, layering drums, basslines, and scratch solos on top of each other.

Qbert, along with other Skratch Piklz, created a series of videos entitled Turntable TV. Now out of print, the first 5 episodes were released on VHS and contained demonstrations, showcases, skits, and other DJ related content.

Qbert's solo efforts include 1994's Demolition Pumpkin Squeeze Musik, and 1998's Wave Twisters. The latter album was created mainly with samplers and beat machines versus the turntable, and later turned into an animated feature of the same title. He performed in the first Coachella Valley Music and Arts Festival in 1999, becoming the first natural-born Filipino and arguably the first Filipino act to perform at the festival.

The 2001 movie Wave Twisters was somewhat unusual in that the animators and digital artists had to invent images and movements to the pre-recorded music, as opposed to the other way around (Disney's Fantasia was made the same way).

More recently, he has worked with Vestax to develop the QFO, an all-in-one scratching instrument. The QFO combines a turntable with a mixer's crossfader. In 2006, he introduced the Qbert turntable cartridge, a model put out by Ortofon.

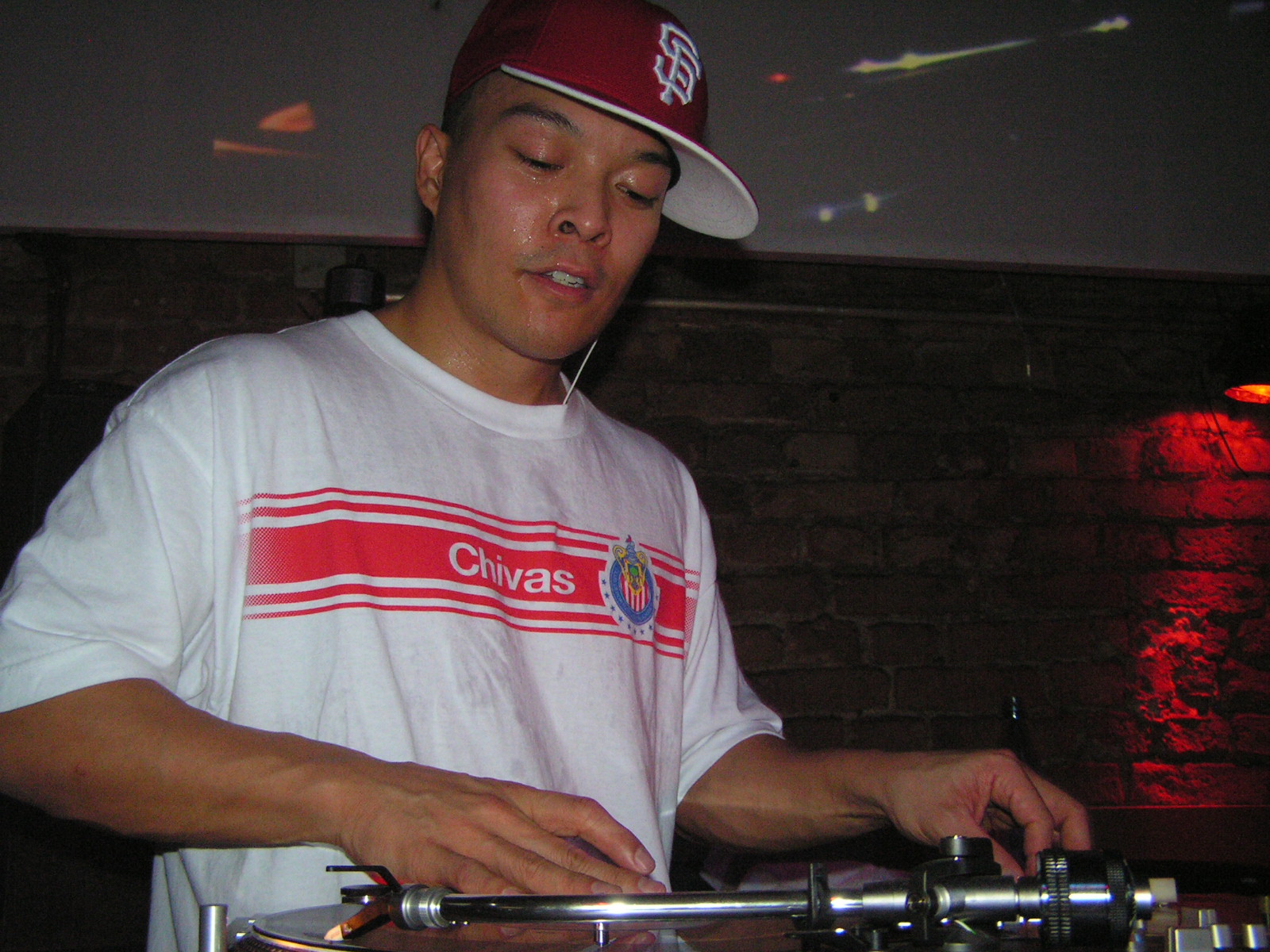
Qbert performing in 2008

In May 2009, Qbert launched the Qbert Skratch University, an interactive online learning school and community for DJs through the ArtistWorks website.

At the 2016 edition of the DMC World DJ Championships, DJ Q-Bert was awarded with a DMC Legend jacket.

He performed again in the Coachella Valley Music and Arts Festival in 2018.

== Personal life ==
In a 2011 interview with the website WeBeVegan.org, Qbert stated that he is a vegan.

== Media appearances ==
Qbert's music was featured in the video game Tony Hawk's Underground and he appeared as himself on the Slam City Jam level. He also appeared as himself in DJ Hero 2.

== Discography ==
Studio albums

- Wave Twisters, Episode 7 Million: Sonic Wars Within the Protons (1998)
- Extraterrestria (2014)
- GalaXXXian (2014)
- Origins (Wave twisters zero) (2020)
- Next Cosmos (2022)

== Awards and credentials ==
- America's Best DJ 2010
- DMC USA Champion 1991 (solo)
- DMC World Champion 1992 – Rock Steady DJs (Qbert, Mix Master Mike & Apollo)
- DMC World Champion 1993 – Dreamteam (Qbert & Mix Master Mike)
- DMC DJ Hall of Fame (along with Mix Master Mike)
- Featured in Hang the DJ by Marco & Mauro La Villa
  - Cannes Film Festival, France
- Appears in the documentary film Modulations
  - Sundance Festival, Utah
- Appears in the documentary Scratch
  - Sundance Festival, Utah
- Appears in his own animated/live action movie Wave Twisters

== See also ==
- Filipino hip hop
