= Mark LeVine =

American historian

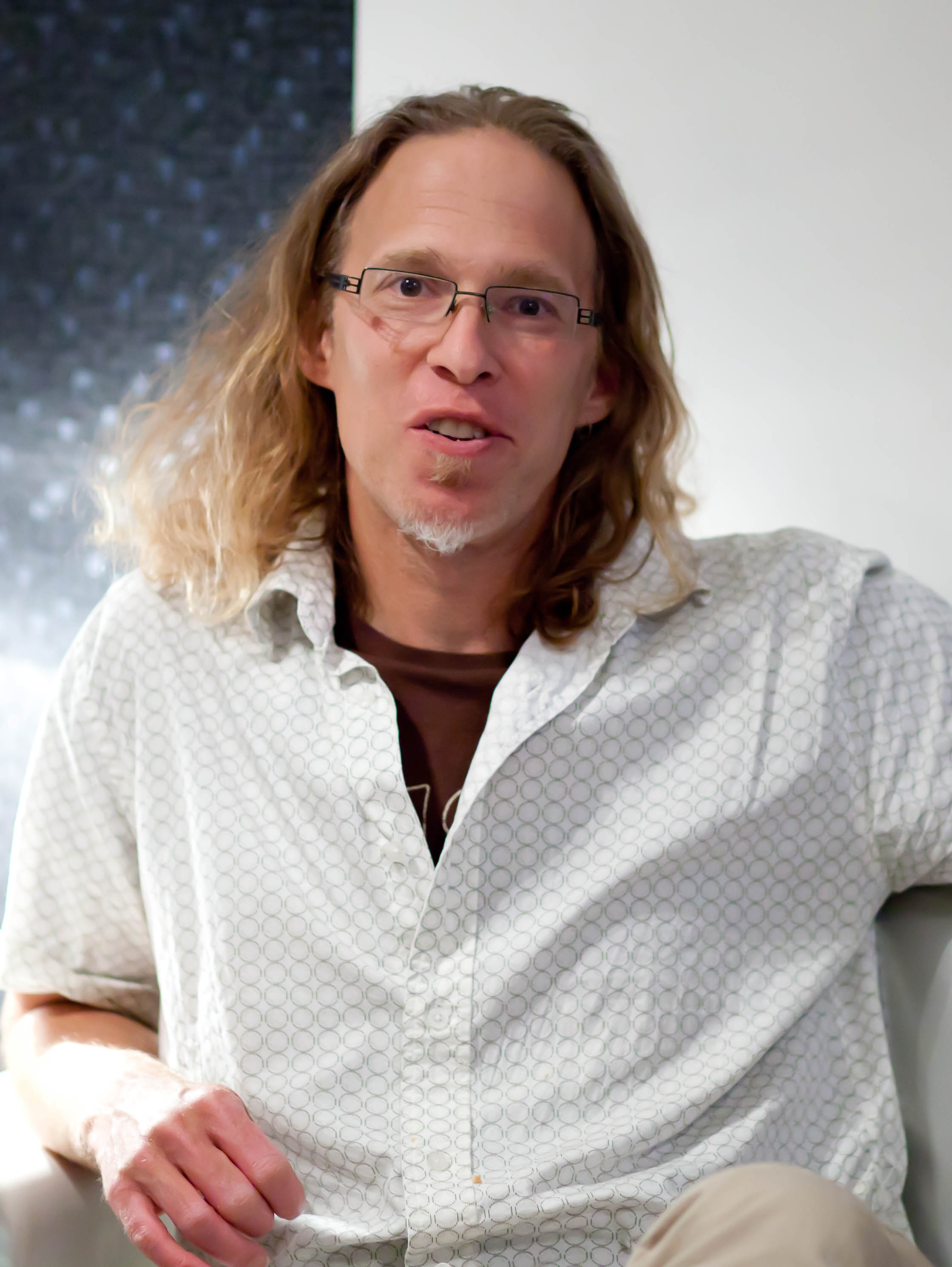
- LeVine in 2011
- Education: New York University
- Occupations: Historian, musician, writer, professor

Mark Andrew LeVine is an American historian, musician, writer, and professor. He is a professor of history at the University of California, Irvine.

== Education ==
LeVine received his B.A. in comparative religion and biblical studies from Hunter College and his M.A. and Ph.D. from New York University's Department of Middle Eastern Studies. He speaks multiple languages including Arabic, Hebrew, Turkish, Persian, Italian, French, German and English.

== Israeli–Palestinian conflict ==
With regard to the Israeli–Palestinian conflict, LeVine argues for a 'parallel states' scenario, involving the dissolution of borders and overlapping sovereignty across the entirety of historic Palestine. LeVine has recently theorized that the only trope which can explain what he calls Israel's 'totalitarian' control over Palestinian people is that afforded by Quantum Mechanics. By totalitarian he does not mean the systems that prevailed in Nazi Germany, Fascist states, or Communist Russia and China, but the intricate matrix of control established by the Israeli occupation throughout the spatial territory Palestinians inhabit, by virtue of which the Palestinians have no more influence over their life paths than an electron in a field does. This control extends to the airspace, and underground (harvesting the water resources), to the present and the past, making for a unique synergy of "bio" and "necro"-politics. He claims that maps created by ICAHD show that a dozen control parameters are in place at any one coordinate point in the West Bank. The result in his view is that the Israeli occupation,'represents criminalized state behavior at the most systematic, intricately planned and executed, widest possible scale, and longest duration.'

LeVine has written that he is Jewish, speaks Hebrew fluently, has lived in Israel, has numerous family and friends there, and that "Prophetic Judaism that has always been the core of my identity". He is a member of the Academic Council of Jewish Voice for Peace.

== Music ==
LeVine is a rock guitarist and has played with noted rock and world beat musicians such as Mick Jagger, Chuck D, Michael Franti, and Doctor John. He recorded with Moroccan Hassan Hakmoun, and the French Gypsy band Les Yeux Noirs on Ozomatli's album Street Signs, which won the Grammy for Best Latin Rock/Alternative album in 2005.

== Views ==
LeVine, in analyzing historian Noel Ignatiev's anti-racism writings on the white race, concurred in 2019 that "abolishing whiteness has never been more urgent", supporting Noel Ignatiev's position in the "condemnation of an irredeemable whiteness and the identities that flow from it" with a simple quote: “As long as you think you’re white, there’s no hope for you.”.

== Books ==
- Overthrowing Geography: Jaffa, Tel Aviv and the Struggle for Palestine; University of California Press (2005) ISBN 978-0-520-23994-4
- Why They Don't Hate Us: Lifting the Veil on the Axis of Evil; Oneworld Publications (2005) ISBN 978-1-85168-365-9
- An Impossible Peace: Oslo and the Burdens of History; Zed Books (2007) ISBN 978-1-84277-768-8
- Heavy Metal Islam: Rock, Resistance, and the Struggle for the Soul of Islam; Three Rivers Press, New York (2008) ISBN 978-0-307-35339-9
- Struggle and Survival in Palestine/Israel, Mark LeVine, Gershon Shafir, University of California Press (2012) ISBN 978-0520262539

LeVine's book Why They Don't Hate Us was hailed by Douglas A. Davis, Emeritus Professor of Psychology at Haverford College as an innovative, trenchant analysis, massively documented, of the West's 'cultural jamming' within the modern Arab world, together with a powerful diagnosis of neoconservative thinkers and the pretensions of globalization.

British journalist Bryan Appleyard gave it a mixed review in the London Sunday Times . Appleyard was sternly critical of the book's style and organization, and disparaged the ideological underpinnings, rooted in "idealism," which, he claimed, informed Levine's work. Appleyard nevertheless wrote, "LeVine is absolutely right and, indeed, quite brave to insist on the reality of complexity. Terrorism and war both tend to simplify world views and, without doubting their intellectual status, so do the utopians of the new right... Perhaps his book’s greatest virtue is that it introduces both the many shades of opinion and cultural complexity of the, largely, Arab world... LeVine detonates the uneasy but nonetheless profound complacency that seems to have invaded politics."

== Co-edited books ==
- Twilight of Empire: Responses to Occupation co-edited with Viggo Mortensen and Pilar Perez; Perceval Press (2004)
- Religion, Social Practices and Contested Hegemonies: Reconstructing the Public Sphere in Muslim Majority Societies co-edited with Armando Salvatore; Palgrave Press (2005)
- Reapproaching the Border: News Perspectives on the Study of Israel and Palestine co-edited with Sandra Sufian; Rowman and Littlefield (2007)

== Publications ==
- Islam and Popular Culture, co-editor with Karin van Nieuwkerk and Martin Stokes, forthcoming.
- Before the Spring, After the Fall, writer, co-producer; directed by Jed Rothstein, Global Voices, PBS, summer 2014, theatrical release, fall 2013.
- The Five Year-Old Who Toppled a Pharaoh and Other Stories Along the Arab Revolutionary Road, UC Press, forthcoming.
- One Land, Two States: Israel and Palestine as Parallel States, co-edited with Ambassador Mathias Mossberg, UC Press, 2014.
- “Theory and Praxis of the Arab Uprisings,” special issue of Middle East Critique, Editor, Winter Fall 2013.
- “Theorizing Revolutionary Practice: Agendas for Research on the Arab Uprisings,” Middle East Critique, Winter 2014.
- “Rap and the Stages of Revolution: From Subculture to the Lonely Grind in the Arab World,” Cyber Orient, Fall 2013.
- Ghana and Afrobeat, the History of a Music and a Continent, documentary co-produced/directed for NPR's Afropop, NEH Award, 2013.
- “Music and the Aura of Revolution,” International Journal of Middle Eastern Studies, #44 (2012).
- Heavy Metal: Controversies and Countercultures, co-edited with Keith Kahn-Harris and Titus Hjelm, London: Equinox Books, 2013.
- “Music and Resistance in the Arab Spring,” in Larbi Sadiki, ed., Resistance Cultures and Politics in the Arab World, Routledge, forthcoming.
- “Culture Jamming and the Return of the Aura in the Arab Uprisings,” Marilyn DeLaure, ed., The Culture Jamming Reader (NYU Press, forthcoming).
- “Immediacy, Emurgency, and Revolutionary Praxis,” in Performance Studies: Key Words, Concepts, and Theories, edited by Bryan Reynolds, NY: Palgrave MacMillan, 2013.
- “How a music about death affirms life: Middle Eastern metal and the return of music's aura,” in Ian Peddie, ed. Popular Music and Human Rights, Vol. II, London: Ashgate, 2011.
- Struggle and Survival in Israel/Palestine, co-editor with Gershon Shafir. Berkeley: University of California Press, 2012.
- Manshurat, 2nd album of Egyptian revolutionary singer Ramy Essam, guitarist, 2012.
- “New Hybridities of Arab Musical Intifadas,” Jadaliyya, October 16, 2011.
- Headbanging Against Repressive Regimes: Censorship of heavy metal in the Middle East, North Africa, Southeast Asia and China, Report #9, 2010.
- “Doing the Devil’s Work: Heavy Metal and the Threat to Public Order in the Muslim World,” Social Compass, December 2009 56: 564–576.
- Flowers in the Desert, producer and composer, released by EMI Records internationally, November 2009.
- “Rock, Resistance and the Rise of New Muslim Public Spheres,” in Olivier Roy and Amel Boubekeur, eds., Beyond Islamism, Columbia University Press, 2009.
- Impossible Peace: Israel/Palestine Since 1989, London: Zed Books, 2009.
- “Heavy metal Muslims: the rise of a post-Islamist public sphere,” Contemporary Islam, Vol. 2, #3, 2009, pp. 229 – 249
- Heavy Metal Islam: Rock, Resistance, and the Struggle for the Soul of Islam, NY: Random House, 2008.
- Reapproaching Borders: New Perspectives on the Study of Israel/Palestine, co-editor, Rowman Littlefield, 2007.
- Why They Don't Hate Us: Lifting the Veil on the Axis of Evil, Oxford: Oneworld Publications, 2005.
- "Fateful Triangles: Modernity and its Antinomies in a Mediterranean Port City," in Thomas Bender and Alev Cinar, eds., Locating the City: Urban Imaginaries and the Practice of Modernity, University of Minnesota Press, forthcoming
- "Chaos, Globalization and the Public Sphere: Political Struggles in Weak-State Countries," in Vali Nasr, ed. Political Islam, the State and Globalization, Oxford: Oxford University Press, Submitted
- "Islam and Urban Politics in Israel: The Muslim Association and the struggle for autonomy in Jaffa," in Dan Rabinowtiz and Daniel Monterescu, eds., Mixed Towns/Trapped Communities: Historical Narratives, Spatial Dynamics Gender Relations and Cultural Encounters in Palestinian-Israeli Mixed Towns, London: Ashgate Publishing.
- "Reforming Muslim Public Spheres: A methodological Genealogy," in Seteney Shami, ed., Approaching Public Spheres: Theory, History, Gender, Conflict, manuscript under review.
- "Crossing the Borders: Labor, Community and Colonialism in the Jaffa-Tel-Aviv Region during the Mandate Period," in Gil Gonzalez and Gil Gonzalez, et al., eds., Labor and Empire, NY: Routledge, 2004.
- "Planning to Conquer: Modernity and its Antinomies in the New-Old Jaffa," Haim Yacobi, ed., Constructing a Sense of Place: Architecture and the Zionist Discourse, London: Ashgate, 2004.
- "Popularizing the Public and Publicizing the Popular: Contesting Popular Cultures in Mandatory Jaffa and Tel Aviv," in Ted Swedenburg and Rebecca Stein, eds., Popular Palestine: Palestine, Israel and the Politics of Popular Culture, Ralley Durham: Duke University Press, 2005.
- "Land, Law, and the Planning of Empire," in Huri Islamoglu, ed., Constitutions of Property in Comparative Perspective, London:I.B.Tauris, 2004.
- "Socio-Religious Movements and the Transformation of 'Common Sense' into a Politics of 'Common Good'" in Religion, Social Practice, and Contested Hegemonies: Reconstructing Muslim Public Spheres, ed. by Armando Salvatore and Mark LeVine, NY: Palgrave, 2005.
- "'Human Nationalisms' versus 'Inhuman Globalisms': Cultural Economies of Globalization and the Re-Imagining of Muslim Identities in Europe and the Middle East," in Stefano Allievi and Jorgen Nielsen, eds., Muslim Networks and Transnational Communities in and Across Europe, Leiden: Brill, 2003.
- "Locating Home: Overthrowing Geography, Misreading Modernity and Other Adventures in the Search for the Routes that Divide Us," in Bo Strath, ed. Homeland, Brussels: Peter Lang, 2003.
- "The 'New-Old Jaffa': Tourism, Gentrification, and the Battle for Tel Aviv's 'Arab Neighborhood," in Nezar AlSayyad, ed., Global Norms/Urban Forms: On the Manufacture and Consumption of Traditions in the Built Environment, New York, Spon/Routledge, 2000, pp. 240–72.
- "A Diplomatic History of the El Salvador Peace Process," in Johnstone & Doyle, Eds., The Future of UN Peace-keeping: El Salvador and Cambodia and the Secretary-General's Agenda for Peace, London, Cambridge University Press, 1997.

== See also ==
- Culture jamming
