= The 13th Scroll =

Studio album by Cobra Strike
- Released: August 24, 1999 2010 (reissue)
- Recorded: 1999 at Moseleum Tunnel, Chatsworth, California
- Genre: Avant-garde metal, electronica
- Length: 52:34
- Label: Ion
- Producer: Travis Dickerson, Buckethead, Jerry Mano

Cobra Strike chronology
The 13th Scroll (1999)	Cobra Strike II: Y, Y+B, X+Y <hold> ← (2000)

Professional ratings
Review scores
Source	Rating
Pitchfork Media	(7.0/10)

The 13th Scroll is the first album by American avant-garde metal band Cobra Strike, released in 1999. In addition to lead member Buckethead, the album features drums by Pinchface, with additional drum programming by Bryan "Brain" Mantia and DJ Disk. On the right of artwork is shown Ultraman Hayata, a character of Ultraman, a popular 1966 Japanese Tokusatsu TV show.

The term "cobra strike" was inspired by the video game G.I. Joe: Cobra Strike (1983). Artwork for the second album features cobras as seen in the game.

== Track listing ==
No.	Title	Length
1.	"The 13th Scroll"	5:10
2.	"Water Ceiling"	0:29
3.	"7th Hall/6th Door"	2:24
4.	"Blank Sky"	0:53
5.	"Torn Face"	5:14
6.	"Wound"	0:55
7.	"Inferno"	6:18
8.	"Braingate"	2:59
9.	"CS-118"	1:55
10.	"Torture Tunnel"	3:49
11.	"Headstone"	1:10
12.	"Hidden Tomb"	6:23
13.	"32nd Degree"	1:39
14.	"Helicopter Kick"	3:12
15.	"Black Sea River"	1:15
16.	"Silent Scream"	1:40
17.	"Buried Alive"	1:38
18.	"The 13th Scroll (Digging to the Devil)"	5:31

== Personnel ==
Musicians

- Buckethead – guitars, bass, production
- Pinchface – drums
- Bryan "Brain" Mantia – programming
- DJ Disk – programming

Additional personnel

- Travis Dickerson – production, engineering
- Jerry Mano – production
- Infared Otis – executive production
- Shinya Takamura – artwork
