= Cobra Strike =

Cobra Strike may refer to:

- G.I. Joe: Cobra Strike, a video game for the Atari 2600
- Cobra Strike, a side project of musician Buckethead
- Cobra Strike, a science fiction novel by Timothy Zahn
