= 3 Fools 4 April =

2006 live album by Viggo Mortensen

Live album by Viggo Mortensen
- Released: December 2006
- Recorded: April 1, 2005 at Beyond Baroque in Venice, California
- Genre: Spoken word
- Labels: TDRS Music; Perceval Press

Viggo Mortensen chronology
Intelligence Failure (2005)	3 Fools 4 April (2006)	Time Waits for Everyone (2007)

3 Fools 4 April

Video by Viggo Mortensen
- Released: December 2006
- Recorded: April 1, 2005 at Beyond Baroque in Venice, California
- Genre: Spoken word
- Labels: TDRS Music; Perceval Press

Professional ratings
Review scores
Source	Rating
Allmusic	3.5/5 stars

3 Fools 4 April is the first CD/DVD by actor Viggo Mortensen, released in 2006. The album was recorded at Beyond Baroque Literary Arts Center in Venice, California (like his two live albums Live at Beyond Baroque and Live At Beyond Baroque II) on April 1, 2005.

The album features the reading of Viggo Mortensen, his son Henry Mortensen, and Scott Wannberg. Some of the readings come from poets like the Chilean Nobel prize winner Pablo Neruda, Chuang Tse, or even his ex-wife Exene Cervenka, while some of them are anonymous.

== Track listing ==
=== CD ===
No.	Title	Writer(s)	Length
1.	"Introduction"		1:02
2.	"everything is really water"		4:10
3.	"the war"		1:18
4.	"freedom fighter"		1:02
5.	"back to Babylon"		3:28
6.	"hunters anonymous"		1:11
7.	"white hot heart"		0:46
8.	"elk"	shaeryn smith	1:51
9.	"the discourse on peace"	lawrence ferlinghetti	0:37
10.	"open heart university"	spike milligan	0:59
11.	"god loves it when you dance"		1:37
12.	"second chance, give or take a few"		1:47
13.	"march"		1:25
14.	"the smiling samurai"		2:23
15.	"5 haiku"		0:59
16.	"america"	pablo neruda	1:40
17.	"outlaws in the sun"		1:44
18.	"virtual unreality"	exene cervenka	0:34
19.	"linger"		3:45
20.	"kingman run"		5:39
21.	"the mice"	charles bukowski	0:52
22.	"a matter of choice"		0:24
23.	"strange food hoedown"		1:04
24.	"why i'm not a businessman"		1:49
25.	"public relations"		1:56
26.	"no mercy"		2:50
27.	"kelsey"		0:36
28.	"battle of wits"		0:48
29.	"view"	muriel nelson	1:31
30.	"rivers of pain"		1:18
31.	"world shaking baker"		1:50
32.	"madrid to New York"		3:27
33.	"nobody has to die"		1:44
34.	"down and back"		1:18
35.	"perfect world"	exene cervenka	3:53
36.	"penn. ave. pantasy #456"		1:53
37.	"utopian chaos"		0:37
38.	"to my daughter, young-a"	yu ch'i-hwan	1:31
39.	"stupid is as stupid does"		2:25
40.	"the rose"	anonymous	0:43
41.	"last round: Truce /Pioneers /Chuang Tse"		2:43

=== DVD ===
No.	Title	Writer(s)	Length
1.	"the war"
2.	"second chance, give or take a few"
3.	"back to Babylon"
4.	"the smiling samurai"
5.	"5 haiku"
6.	"a matter of choice"
7.	"hunters anonymous"
8.	"white hot heart"
9.	"the discourse on peace"	lawrence ferlinghetti
10.	"nobody has to die"
11.	"elk"	shaeryn smith
12.	"public relations"
13.	"no mercy"
14.	"why i'm not a businessman"
15.	"linger"
16.	"kingman run"
17.	"the mice"	charles bukowski
18.	"first light"
19.	"rivers of pain"
20.	"freedom fighter"
21.	"fossils"
22.	"penn.ave fantasy #456"
23.	"virtual unreality"	exene cervenka
24.	"communion"
25.	"strange food hoedown"
26.	"utopian chaos"
27.	"madrid to New York"
28.	"ode to the bedpan"
29.	"kelsey"
30.	"march"
31.	"empathy hoedown"
32.	"battle of wits"
33.	"hallowe'en"
34.	"outlaws in the sun"
35.	"chuang tse"	chuang tse

== Credits ==
- Viggo Mortensen – editing
- Henry Mortensen
- Scott Wannberg
- Travis Dickerson – editing, mixing, mastering
