= Time Waits for Everyone =

Studio album by Viggo Mortensen
- Released: November 23, 2007
- Genre: Spoken word, Avant-Garde
- Label: TDRS Music; Perceval Press
- Producer: Travis Dickerson; Viggo Mortensen

Viggo Mortensen chronology
3 Fools 4 April (2006)	Time Waits for Everyone (2007)	At All (2008)

Professional ratings
Review scores
Source	Rating
Allmusic	4/5 stars

Time Waits for Everyone is the ninth studio album by actor and musician Viggo Mortensen, released in 2007. It is Mortensen's first release to only feature himself playing piano without the collaboration of anyone else. All tracks are improvisations inspired from trips to Hungary, Germany, Poland, Russia, and according to Mortensen, remembrance of things past.

The album was released on Mortensen's label Perceval Press but was later re-released on TDRS Music along with his next album At All.

== Track listing ==
No.	Title	Length
1.	"Confession"	3:24
2.	"Berlin poem"	2:44
3.	"Farvel farbror"	7:02
4.	"Thursday"	2:22
5.	"The lake"	5:11
6.	"Oswiecem poem"	3:39
7.	"Warzawa morning poem"	1:00
8.	"You are there"	3:39
9.	"Danube poem"	4:34
10.	"Ashes"	2:18
11.	"Ural poem"	3:28
12.	"Time waits for everyone - usually"	4:41
13.	"Time waits for everyone - always"	5:47
14.	"Seed"	2:56
15.	"Belzec poem"	3:15
16.	"Munchen morning poem"	1:17
17.	"Treblinka poem"	1:59
18.	"Amends"	5:15

== Credits ==
- Viggo Mortensen - piano, voice, and producer
- Travis Dickerson - producer, engineer, mastering, and mixing
