= Iconography (disambiguation) =

Iconography is the study of icons

Iconography may also refer to:

- Iconography, a 1986 Bill Nelson (musician) album
- Iconography, a 2009 Travis Dickerson album
