= Cobra Strike II =

Cobra Strike II - Y, Y+B, X+Y

Studio album by Cobra Strike
- Released: 2000
- Studio: TDRS Music and Buckethead's Coop
- Genre: Experimental rock
- Length: 56:10
- Label: ION
- Producer: Travis Dickerson; Buckethead

Cobra Strike chronology
13th Scroll (1999)	Cobra Strike II - Y, Y+B, X+Y (2000)

Professional ratings
Review scores
Source	Rating
Allmusic	2/5 stars

Cobra Strike II: Y, Y+B, X+Y <hold> ← is the second album by Buckethead's side project Cobra Strike. In addition to Buckethead and DJ Disk, this album features a completely different cast of musicians.

The term "cobra strike" was inspired by the video game G.I. Joe: Cobra Strike (1983). Artwork for the album features cobras as seen in the game.

The music is similar to their first album, The 13th Scroll and includes several sound samples from movies, most notably El Topo ( «Desert» and «First Master» ) and Phantasm ( « The Funeral » ) . The title and the content of «Yoshimitsu's Den» is a reference to a game character for the Tekken series of fighting games.

== Track listing ==
No.	Title	Length
1.	"Desert"	0:09
2.	"False Radien Cross"	4:17
3.	"Poison Wind"	2:33
4.	"Hellchop to Blind Claw"	1:53
5.	"The Funeral"	3:35
6.	"Beware of the Holding Funnel"	5:30
7.	"Traitors Gate"	5:52
8.	"Moonflake"	2:43
9.	"First Master"	2:11
10.	"Splinter Pool"	4:37
11.	"Notorious Swade"	3:37
12.	"Blood Scroll"	7:52
13.	"Yoshimitsu's Den"	4:03
14.	"Cobra Cartlige"	1:50
15.	"Slap to Branding Nunchuka"	3:06
16.	"Spider Crawl"	2:22

== Personnel ==
- Buckethead - guitars
- SHePz - Bass
- Gonervill - beats
- O.P. Original Princess - voice
- P-Sticks - beats
- Travis Dickerson - producer
- Buckethead - producer
