= Stray Records =

- Parent company: Dogday Entertainment
- Founded: 1998
- Defunct: 2001
- Genre: Electronic, Hip hop
- Country of origin: US
- Location: Oakland, CA

Stray Records was an American record label based in Oakland, California. In its short period of activity from 1998 to 2001 the subsidiary of Dogday Records released several dozen records. Artists of Stray included DJ Cue and Eddie Def (both members of Drum Machine Technicians) as well as Faust & Shortee (now known as Urban Assault), Bullet Proof Space Travelers, No Forcefield (with Larry LaLonde of Primus), Westside Chemical, Mudkids and Oakland Faders. Then Guns N' Roses guitarist Buckethead was signed in January 2001.

== Selected discography ==
- Azeem: Craft Classic (2000)
- Ben Wa: Disciples of Retro-Tech (2001)
- Buckethead: Somewhere Over the Slaughterhouse (2001)
- The Coup: Steal This Album (1998)
- DJ Disk: 149 Ways to Smash Paul Simon's Face Breaks (2000)
- Gonervill Presents the Freak Brothers (feat. Bryan "Brain" Mantia, Buckethead, DJ Flare, Extrakd, Limbomaniacs, Praxis and others, 2001)
- Phonosychographdisk vs. The Filthy Ape: Mooch the Moose: Smack Dealer to the Stars (2001)
