= Travis Dickerson =

American musician and producer

- Born: United States
- Genres: Rock, metal
- Occupations: Musician, producer
- Instruments: Vocals, keyboards
- Website: tdrsmusic.com

Travis Dickerson is an American musician and producer best known for his work with Buckethead and Viggo Mortensen. He also runs TDRS music, a recording studio with its own record label that has released albums by Bill Laswell, Jethro Tull, Linda Ronstadt, and Vince DiCola. Dickerson can be heard playing keyboards on many albums he has recorded and produced.

== Career ==
Dickerson built his first recording studio in Michigan, where he began writing and recording songs. Soon after, he moved the studio to Chatsworth, Los Angeles, where he met the punk band X and helped them record a number of albums. Vocalist Exene Cervenka introduced Dickerson to Viggo Mortensen, starting a long friendship. Nearly all of Mortensen's albums since then have been recorded or distributed by TDRS.

In 1994, Dickerson recorded and played keyboards on County Fair 2000, an album by Phil Alvin of the Blasters. Throughout the 1990s, he worked with the Plimsouls, Vince Dicola, Jethro Tull, Linda Ronstadt, L7, Eliza Gilkyson, Top Jimmy, the Negro Problem, and many others. In 1998, he produced and played on Shocking Pink Banana Seat by singer–songwriter Susan James.

Buckethead and Dickerson met in San Francisco, and the guitarist found a new home at TDRS. Dickerson produced and played keyboards on several Buckethead recordings and in 2001, they formed Thanatopsis, a band combining progressive and rock styles. Released in 2004 as a Buckethead album, Population Override likewise featured a large contribution from Dickerson in both composition and performance. In 2006, Chicken Noodles, a series of jams, followed, with Chicken Noodles II being released a year later. Additionally, Dickerson remastered the early Cornbugs albums, a project Buckethead was involved in with actor Bill Moseley.

In 2008, Dickerson, Buckethead, and Brain formed the band The Dragons of Eden and released an album of the same name.

In 2009, Dickerson released his debut solo album, Iconography. Guest musicians on the record included his brother Lindy on guitar, Buckethead, Paul Ill on bass, DJ Bonebrake, Brain, Ramy Antoun, and Doane Perry on drums, Scarlet Rivera on violin, Cameron Stone on cello, and Vince DiCola on keyboards. In 2012, he issued his second album, titled The Owl Dives Through the Crescent Moon. This recording also included contributions from Lindy Dickerson, DJ Bonebrake, and Paul Ill.

== Discography ==
=== Solo ===
- Iconography (2009)
- The Owl Dives Through the Crescent Moon (2012)

=== As sideman (partial) ===
- County Fair 2000 – Phil Alvin (1994)
- One Less Thing to Worry About – Viggo Mortensen (1997)
- Recent Forgeries – Viggo Mortensen (1998)
- Shocking Pink Banana Seat – Susan James (1998)
- The Other Parade – Viggo Mortensen (1999)
- Tunnel – Death Cube K (1999)
- 13th Scroll – Cobra Strike (1999)
- One Man's Meat – Viggo Mortensen (1999)
- Cobra Strike II – Cobra Strike (2000)
- Thanatopsis – Thanatopsis (2001)
- Somewhere Over the Slaughterhouse – Buckethead (2001)
- Funnel Weaver – Buckethead (2002)
- Axiology – Thanatopsis (2003)
- Pandemoniumfromamerica – Viggo Mortensen (2003)
- Please Tomorrow – Viggo Mortensen (2004)
- Carry Me Away – Lindy Dickerson (2004)
- Brain Circus – Cornbugs (2004)
- Donkey Town – Cornbugs (2004)
- Population Override – Buckethead (2004)
- This, That, and the Other – Viggo Mortensen (2004)
- Gorgone – Gorgone (2005)
- Intelligence Failure – Viggo Mortensen (2005)
- Anatomize – Thanatopsis (2006)
- Crime Slunk Scene – Buckethead (2006)
- 3 Fools 4 April – Viggo Mortensen (2006)
- Chicken Noodles – Buckethead & Travis Dickerson (2006)
- Chicken Noodles II – Buckethead & Travis Dickerson (2007)
- Time Waits for Everyone – Viggo Mortensen (2007)
- At All – Viggo Mortensen (2008)
- Running After Deer – Alix Lambert & Travis Dickerson (2008)
- The Dragons of Eden – The Dragons of Eden (2008)
- Albino Slug – Buckethead (2008)
- Left Hanging – Travis Dickerson & Buckethead (2010)
- Requiem – Thanatopsis (2015)
