= Heavy Metal Islam =

2008 book by Mark LeVine

- Author: Mark LeVine
- Language: English
- Genre: Non-fiction
- Publication date: 2008

Heavy Metal Islam is a 2008 non-fiction book by Mark LeVine, a professor of Middle East history. LeVine details the growth of heavy metal music in the Middle Eastern countries Morocco, Egypt, Palestine, Lebanon, Iran and Pakistan as he travels within those countries for five years. The book not only is just about his travels and heavy metal music, but was also meant as a promotional tool for his companion album.
