= List of awards and nominations received by Viggo Mortensen =

Viggo Mortensen awards and nominations
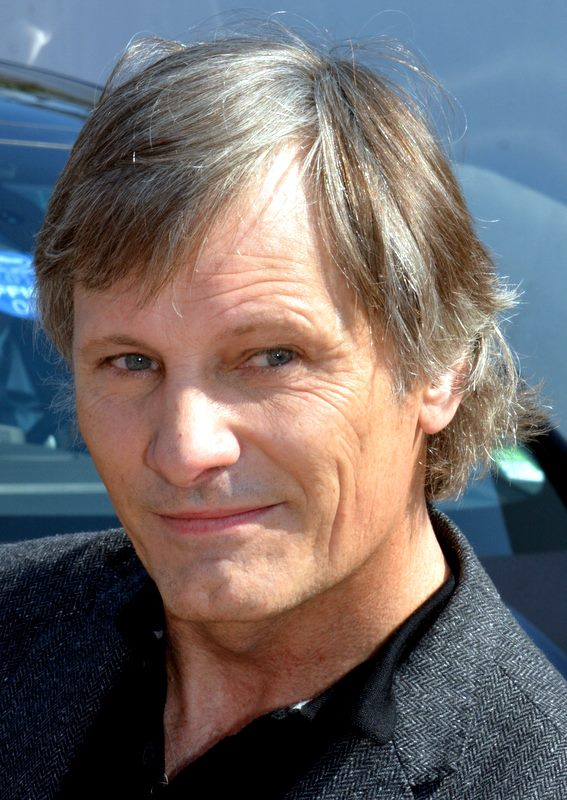
- Mortensen at the 2016 Cannes Film Festival
Awards and nominations
Award	Wins	Nominations
Golden Globe	0	4
Academy Awards	0	3
BAFTA Awards	0	3
Screen Actors Guild Awards	1	7

Viggo Mortensen has received numerous accolades throughout his career. His portrayal of Aragorn in The Lord of the Rings trilogy earned him nominations for the SAG Award for Outstanding Cast, winning for the final instalment The Return of the King (2003).

His performances in Eastern Promises (2007), Captain Fantastic (2016) and Green Book (2018) earned him nominations for the Academy Award, BAFTA Award, Golden Globe (Note: The first two were nominated in the drama category and the last was nominated in the musical or comedy category.) and SAG Award for Best Actor. The first (Note: which also won him the British Independent Film Award for Best Actor.) and last (Note: which also won him the National Board of Review Award for Best Actor.) of these, as well as The Road (2009), also earned him nominations for the Critics' Choice Movie Award for Best Actor. He also received a nomination for the Golden Globe Award for Best Supporting Actor for his role in A Dangerous Method (2011), which won him the Canadian Screen Award.

== Major associations ==
=== Academy Awards ===
Year	Nominated work	Category	Result	Ref.
2008	Eastern Promises	Best Actor	Nominated	
2017	Captain Fantastic	Best Actor	Nominated	
2019	Green Book	Best Actor	Nominated	

=== BAFTA Awards ===
Year	Nominated work	Category	Result	Ref.
2008	Eastern Promises	Best Actor in a Leading Role	Nominated	
2017	Captain Fantastic	Best Actor in a Leading Role	Nominated	
2019	Green Book	Best Actor in a Leading Role	Nominated	

=== Golden Globe Awards ===
Year	Nominated work	Category	Result	Ref.
2008	Eastern Promises	Best Actor – Drama	Nominated	
2012	A Dangerous Method	Best Supporting Actor	Nominated	
2017	Captain Fantastic	Best Actor – Drama	Nominated	
2019	Green Book	Best Actor – Musical or Comedy	Nominated	

=== Screen Actors Guild Awards ===
Year	Nominated work	Category	Result	Ref.
2002	The Lord of the Rings: The Fellowship of the Ring	Outstanding Performance by a Cast in a Motion Picture	Nominated	
2003	The Lord of the Rings: The Two Towers	Outstanding Performance by a Cast in a Motion Picture	Nominated	
2004	The Lord of the Rings: The Return of the King	Outstanding Performance by a Cast in a Motion Picture	Won	
2008	Eastern Promises	Outstanding Performance by a Male Actor in a Leading Role	Nominated	
2017	Captain Fantastic	Outstanding Performance by a Cast in a Motion Picture	Nominated	
2017	Captain Fantastic	Outstanding Performance by a Male Actor in a Leading Role	Nominated	
2019	Green Book	Outstanding Performance by a Male Actor in a Leading Role	Nominated	

== Other awards and nominations ==
=== Academy of Canadian Cinema and Television ===
Year	Nominated work	Category	Result	Ref.
2008	Eastern Promises	Best Performance by an Actor in a Leading Role	Nominated	
2011	A Dangerous Method	Best Performance by an Actor in a Supporting Role	Won	

=== British Independent Film Awards ===
Year	Nominated work	Category	Result	Ref.
2007	Eastern Promises	Best Actor	Won	

=== Canadian Screen Awards ===
Year	Nominated work	Category	Result	Ref.
2007	Eastern Promises	Best Actor	Nominated	
2011	A Dangerous Method	Best Supporting Actor	Won	

=== Chicago Film Critics Association ===
Year	Nominated work	Category	Result	Ref.
2007	Eastern Promises	Best Actor	Nominated	

=== Critics' Choice Movie Awards ===
Year	Nominated work	Category	Result	Ref.
2004	The Lord of the Rings: The Return of the King	Best Acting Ensemble	Won	
2008	Eastern Promises	Best Actor	Nominated	
2010	The Road	Best Actor	Nominated	
2016	Captain Fantastic	Best Actor in a Comedy	Nominated	
2019	Green Book	Best Actor	Nominated	
2019	Green Book	Best Actor in a Comedy	Nominated	

=== Empire Awards ===
Year	Nominated work	Category	Result	Ref.
2002	The Lord of the Rings: The Fellowship of the Ring	Best Actor	Nominated	
2003	The Lord of the Rings: The Two Towers	Best Actor	Nominated	
2004	The Lord of the Rings: The Return of the King	Best Actor	Nominated	
2006	A History of Violence	Best Actor	Nominated	

=== Fangoria Chainsaw Awards ===
Year	Nominated work	Category	Result	Ref.
2010	The Road	Best Actor	Nominated	

=== Florida Film Critics Circle ===
Year	Nominated work	Category	Result	Ref.
2016	Captain Fantastic	Best Actor	Nominated	

=== Goya Awards ===
Year	Nominated work	Category	Result	Ref.
2007	Alatriste	Best Actor	Nominated	

=== Houston Film Critics Society ===
Year	Nominated work	Category	Result	Ref.
2007	Eastern Promises	Best Actor	Nominated	
2009	The Road	Best Actor	Nominated	
2017	Captain Fantastic	Best Actor	Nominated	

=== Independent Spirit Awards ===
Year	Nominated work	Category	Result	Ref.
2017	Captain Fantastic	Best Male Lead	Nominated	

=== London Film Critics Circle ===
Year	Nominated work	Category	Result	Ref.
2006	A History of Violence	Actor of the Year	Nominated	

=== National Board of Review ===
Year	Nominated work	Category	Result	Ref.
2003	The Lord of the Rings: The Return of the King	Best Cast	Won	
2018	Green Book	Best Actor	Won	

=== New York Film Critics Circle ===
Year	Nominated work	Category	Result	Ref.
2005	A History of Violence	Best Actor	3rd Place	
2007	Eastern Promises	Best Actor	2nd Place	
2011	A Dangerous Method	Best Supporting Actor	3rd Place	

=== Online Film Critics Society ===
Year	Nominated work	Category	Result	Ref.
2002	The Lord of the Rings: The Fellowship of the Ring	Best Cast	Nominated	
2003	The Lord of the Rings: The Two Towers	Best Cast	Won	
2008	Eastern Promises	Best Actor	Nominated	
2016	Captain Fantastic	Best Actor	Nominated	

=== Rome Film Festival ===
Year	Category	Nominated work	Result	Ref(s)
2024	Lifetime Achievement Award	Career	Awarded	

=== San Diego Film Critics Society ===
Year	Nominated work	Category	Result	Ref.
2007	Eastern Promises	Best Actor	2nd Place	
2009	The Road	Best Actor	Nominated	
2016	Captain Fantastic	Best Actor	Nominated	

=== Sant Jordi Awards ===
Year	Nominated work	Category	Result	Ref.
2007	Eastern Promises	Best Foreign Actor	Won	

=== Santa Barbara International Film Festival ===
Year	Nominated work	Category	Result	Ref.
2018	Life's Work	American Riviera Award	Awarded	

=== Satellite Awards ===
Year	Nominated work	Category	Result	Ref.
2003	The Lord of the Rings: The Two Towers	Best Supporting Actor – Motion Picture Drama	Nominated	
2005	A History of Violence	Best Actor - Motion Picture Drama	Nominated	
2007	Eastern Promises	Best Actor - Motion Picture Drama	Won	
2011	A Dangerous Method	Best Supporting Actor – Motion Picture	Nominated	
2017	Captain Fantastic	Best Actor – Motion Picture	Won	
2019	Green Book	Best Actor – Motion Picture Musical or Comedy	Nominated	

=== Saturn Awards ===
Year	Nominated work	Category	Result	Ref.
2003	The Lord of the Rings: The Two Towers	Best Actor	Nominated	
2004	The Lord of the Rings: The Return of the King	Best Actor	Nominated	
2006	A History of Violence	Best Actor	Nominated	
2008	Eastern Promises	Best Actor	Nominated	
2010	The Road	Best Actor	Nominated	

=== SFX Award ===
Year	Nominated work	Category	Result	Ref.
2002	The Lord of the Rings: The Two Towers	Best SF or Fantasy Film Actor	Won	

=== St. Louis Gateway Film Critics Association ===
Year	Nominated work	Category	Result	Ref.
2007	Eastern Promises	Best Actor	Nominated	
2016	Captain Fantastic	Best Actor	Nominated	

=== Toronto Film Critics Association ===
Year	Nominated work	Category	Result	Ref.
2007	Eastern Promises	Best Actor	Won	
2009	The Road	Best Actor	Nominated	

=== Vancouver Film Critics Circle ===
Year	Nominated work	Category	Result	Ref.
2008	Eastern Promises	Best Actor in a Canadian Film	Won	
2008	Eastern Promises	Best Actor	Nominated	
2012	A Dangerous Method	Best Supporting Actor in a Canadian Film	Won	

=== Washington D.C. Area Film Critics Association ===
Year	Nominated work	Category	Result	Ref.
2009	The Road	Best Actor	Nominated	
