= Pandemoniumfromamerica =

Studio album by Buckethead & Viggo Mortensen
- Released: November 2003
- Genre: Experimental music, Spoken word
- Length: 44:22
- Label: TDRS Music; Perceval Press
- Producer: Viggo Mortensen

Buckethead & Viggo Mortensen chronology
Live At Beyond Baroque (1999)	Pandemoniumfromamerica (2003)	Live At Beyond Baroque II (2004)

Professional ratings
Review scores
Source	Rating
Allmusic	2.5/5 stars

Pandemoniumfromamerica or Pandemonium From America is the sixth studio album by the actor Viggo Mortensen and the fourth collaboration with avant-garde guitarist Buckethead, released in 2003. The album is dedicated to Noam Chomsky. The album has been described thus:

Using William Blake, Jonathan Swift, and Rumi's prescient wordplay as its point of departure, Pandemoniumfromamerica is a sonic snapshot of 21st century disorientation and dissent.

Besides featuring Buckethead, the album also features Viggo's son Henry Mortensen, keyboardist Travis Dickerson, and the actors Elijah Wood, Billy Boyd, and Dominic Monaghan (Frodo, Pippin, and Merry respectively from Peter Jackson's The Lord of the Rings film trilogy). The label TDRS Music released the album and also posted several pictures on their web page from the recording sessions of this album in which they feature all the collaborators.

Tracks from the album are part of the compilation This, That, and The Other, released in 2004, also compiling the albums One Less Thing to Worry About from 1997, One Man's Meat from 1999, The Other Parade from 1999, and Please Tomorrow of 2004.

== Track listing ==
No.	Title	Length
1.	"Den Gang Jeg Drog Afsted"	3:37
2.	"Back to Babylon"	3:43
3.	"Pandemoniumfromamerica"	2:58
4.	"Gone"	3:53
5.	"They Ate Your family"	1:23
6.	"I Want Mami"	3:36
7.	"Red River Valley"	4:52
8.	"Leave it"	2:27
9.	"Holyhead"	3:33
10.	"Fall of Troy"	1:17
11.	"Shadow"	4:44
12.	"Cuba On Paper"	3:29
13.	"Maybe"	2:57
14.	"Half Fling"	1:40

== Credits ==
=== By song ===
- "Den Gang Jeg Drog Afsted" - Buckethead (guitars), Viggo Mortensen (vocals, organ, piano), and Travis Dickerson (percussion)
- "Back to Babylon" - Henry Mortensen (bass), Viggo Mortensen (vocals, keyboard, percussion)
- "Pandemoniumfromamerica" - William Blake (words), Buckethead (guitars), Henry Mortensen (bass), Viggo Mortensen (harmonica, vocals, piano)
- "Gone" - Buckethead (guitars), Henry Mortensen (piano, vocals), Viggo Mortensen (piano, vocals), Elijah Wood (vocals)
- "They Ate Your Family" - Buckethead (guitars), Viggo Mortensen (vocals)
- "I Want Mami" - Buckethead (guitars), Henry Mortensen (vocals), Viggo Mortensen (vocals, keyboards, wheelchair)
- "Red River Valley" - Buckethead (guitars, bass), Viggo Mortensen (vocals, lesliemonica)
- "Leave it" - Buckethead (guitars), Viggo Mortensen (Rhodes)
- "Holyhead" - Jonathan Swift (words), Buckethead (guitars), Henry Mortensen (bass), Viggo Mortensen (vocals, piano, harmonica)
- "Fall of Troy" - Buckethead (guitars), Henry Mortensen (shaker, tambourine), Viggo Mortensen (keyboards, drums)
- "Shadow" - Dominic Monaghan (words, vocals), Buckethead (guitars), Billy Boyd (bass), Travis Dickerson (keyboards), Henry Mortensen (rhodes), Elijah Wood (percussion), Viggo Mortensen (drums, vocals)
- "Cuba on paper" - Noam Chomsky (words, vocals), Rumi (words), Buckethead (guitars), Havana (streets), Viggo Mortensen (vocals, drums, harmonica)
- "Maybe" - Dominic Monaghan (words, vocals), Buckethead (guitars), Billy Boyd (bass), Elijah Wood (piano), Henry Mortensen (keyboards, drums), Viggo Mortensen (rhodes, drums)
- "Half Fling" - Elijah Wood (words, vocals), Dominic Monaghan (words, vocals), Buckethead (guitars), Henry Mortensen (bass), Billy Boyd (drums), Viggo Mortensen (vocals, harmonica)

=== General credits ===
- Viggo Mortensen - producer
- Travis Dickerson - recording and mastering
