= The Owl Dives Through the Crescent Moon =

Studio album by Travis Dickerson
- Released: February 25, 2012
- Genre: Rock
- Length: 47:11
- Label: TDRS Music
- Producer: Travis Dickerson

Travis Dickerson chronology
Iconography (2009)	The Owl Dives Through the Crescent Moon (2012)

The Owl Dives Through the Crescent Moon is the second studio album, by keyboardist Travis Dickerson. The album was released in February 2012.

The album features the collaborations of bassist Paul Ill, guitarist Lindy Dickerson, and drummer DJ Bonebrake. All of them collaborated on Dickerson's previous album Iconography. As opposed to his previous release, Dickerson now serves also as vocalist. Talking about this new role Dickerson explains:

(...)This CD was inspired by a milestone year and a desire to express it in a stripped-down, thick- and-crunchy rock record. All my CDs released here so far have been instrumental records. Although I really enjoy making instrumental records, there is an expression that can be realized only in a vocal record. A need to tell a story and the emotion the human voice imparts to that story. There is a craft and challenge to songwriting I have always enjoyed, and somewhere a decade ago I got sidetracked and left that part of my writing aside.

The album was made available for pre-release on February 1 through TDRS Music while also releasing an EP consisting of 3 full songs from the album for free. On February 25, 2012, the album was shipped, with the first 100 copies containing a poster signed by the band.

== Track listing ==
No.	Title	Length
1.	"Lonely If You Try"	4:35
2.	"Echo of Trains"	6:00
3.	"Came to Rest"	6:14
4.	"Black of Hearts"	5:30
5.	"Big Brass Bell"	5:59
6.	"The Blue Ray"	5:04
7.	"On Primary Plain"	3:17
8.	"Fate's Even Flow"	5:25
9.	"Counting Angels"	5:10

== Personnel ==
- Travis Dickerson – keyboards, vocals
- Paul Ill – bass
- Lindy Dickerson – guitar
- DJ Bonebrake – drums
