= Somewhere Over the Slaughterhouse =

Somewhere over the Slaughterhouse

Studio album by Buckethead
- Released: June 5, 2001
- Recorded: 2000–2001 at Pilo's Loft
- Genre: Industrial metal, avant-garde, electronic
- Length: 46:55
- Label: Stray Records
- Producer: Travis Dickerson

Buckethead chronology
KFC Skin Piles (2001)	Somewhere over the Slaughterhouse (2001)	Funnel Weaver (2002)

Professional ratings
Review scores
Source	Rating
Allmusic	3/5 stars

Somewhere over the Slaughterhouse is the sixth studio album by Buckethead. To date, it is his only solo album to be released as both a CD and LP and is currently out of print. Problems with rights ownership make a reissue unlikely.

== Track listing ==
No.	Title	Writer(s)	Length
1.	"Somewhere over the Slaughterhouse"	Buckethead/Harold Arlen & E.Y. Harburg	0:38
2.	"Help Me"		5:12
3.	"Pin Bones and Poultry"		4:43
4.	"My Sheeetz"		6:00
5.	"Day of the Ulcer"		7:26
6.	"You Like Headcheese?"		3:20
7.	"Burlap Curtain"		7:04
8.	"You Like This Face?"		5:16
9.	"Wires and Clips"		3:03
10.	"Knockingun"		2:25
11.	"Conveyor Belt Blues"		1:47
Total length:			46:55

== Personnel ==
Performers

- Buckethead — acoustic guitar, electric guitar, bass guitar
- P-Sticks — electronic programming, drum programming, tape effects, artwork

Production

- Recorded in the kitchen at Pilo's Loft and track three recorded at Travis Dickerson's recording studio.
- Mastered by Travis Dickerson at Travis Dickerson Recording Studio, Chatsworth, California.

== "Somewhere over the Slaughterhouse" ==
"Somewhere over the Slaughterhouse"

Song by Buckethead

from the album Somewhere over the Slaughterhouse
- Released: June 5, 2001
- Recorded: 2000–2001 at Pilo's Loft
- Genre: Avant-garde
- Length: 0:38
- Label: Stray Records
- Songwriter(s): Buckethead
- Producer(s): Travis Dickerson

The title track features an intentionally mangled rendition of the song "Over the Rainbow", popularly known as "Somewhere over the Rainbow", from the 1939 movie The Wizard of Oz, as sung by the main character Dorothy Gale portrayed by Judy Garland. It is the inspiration for the title of the track, and thereby the album.

== Credits ==
- Buckethead — acoustic guitar
