= Viggo Mortensen =

American actor (born 1958)

Viggo Mortensen R.
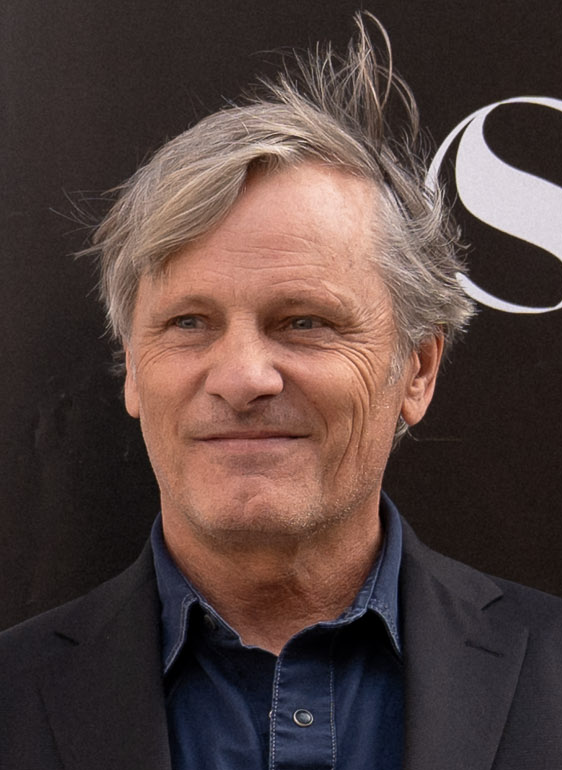
- Mortensen in 2024
- Born: Viggo Peter Mortensen Jr. October 20, 1958 (age 68); New York City, U.S.
- Citizenship: United States; Canada; Denmark
- Education: St. Lawrence University
- Occupations: Actor; artist; director; producer
- Years active: 1984–present
- Spouse: Exene Cervenka (m. 1987; div. 1997)
- Partner: Ariadna Gil (2009–present)
- Children: 1
- Awards: Full list

Viggo Peter Mortensen Jr. (Danish: [ˈviko ˈmɒːtn̩sn̩]; born October 20, 1958) is a Danish-American-Canadian actor and filmmaker. He has received various accolades including an Actor Award and a Critics' Choice Award as well as nominations for three Academy Awards, three BAFTA Awards, and four Golden Globe Awards.

Mortensen made his film debut with a role in Peter Weir's 1985 thriller Witness. Through the late 1990s, Mortensen played supporting roles in a variety of films, including the historical romance The Portrait of a Lady (1996), the action drama G.I. Jane (1997), the crime drama A Perfect Murder (1998), and the comedy 28 Days (2000).

Mortensen gained international attention for his breakthrough role as Aragorn in the fantasy trilogy The Lord of the Rings (2001–2003). He later starred in several David Cronenberg films including A History of Violence (2005), Eastern Promises (2007), for which he was nominated for the Academy Award for Best Actor, A Dangerous Method (2011) and Crimes of the Future (2022). He gained further Academy Award nominations for his leading roles as an anarchist father in Captain Fantastic (2016) and as Tony Lip in Green Book (2018). Mortensen made his directorial debut with Falling (2020), in which he also starred. He also starred in the movie Alatriste (2006), where he portrayed the main character, the movie being the most expensive Spanish language film ever produced.

In addition to film, Mortensen has pursued a variety of artistic endeavors including painting, poetry, music, and photography. Mortensen composed and performed music for films including The Lord of the Rings soundtrack, and has collaborated with guitarist Buckethead on several albums. In 2002, Mortensen founded Perceval Press to publish his works and the works of little-known artists and authors.

== Early life ==
Mortensen was born in New York City, on October 20, 1958, to Grace Gamble (née Atkinson) and Viggo Peter Mortensen Sr. His mother was American, while his father was Danish. They met in Norway. His maternal grandfather was a Canadian from Nova Scotia. His paternal grandmother was from Trondheim, Norway.

In 1961, the family moved to Venezuela, then Denmark, and eventually settled in Argentina. They lived successively in the provinces of Córdoba, Chaco, and Buenos Aires. Mortensen attended primary school and acquired a fluent proficiency in Spanish while his father managed poultry farms and ranches. He was baptized Lutheran, the tradition of his father, though he now identifies as an atheist.

When Mortensen was 11 and his brothers 8 and 6, their parents divorced. In 1969, the three boys returned with their mother to the United States, where Viggo spent the rest of his childhood in Northern New York State. He graduated from Watertown High School in 1976. He attended St. Lawrence University in Canton, New York, earning a bachelor's degree in 1980 in Spanish studies and government.

After graduating, Mortensen moved to Europe and lived in the United Kingdom and Spain before returning to Denmark. There he took various jobs such as driving trucks in Esbjerg and selling flowers in Copenhagen. In 1982, he returned to the United States to pursue an acting career.

== Acting career ==
=== 1980s–1990s: First films ===
Mortensen's first film role was in the Woody Allen film The Purple Rose of Cairo (1985), but his scenes were deleted from the final cut. He was one of the two finalists to play the title role of Tarzan in the adventure film Greystoke: The Legend of Tarzan, Lord of the Apes (1984), though the role eventually went to Christopher Lambert.

His first onscreen appearance was playing an Amish farmer in Peter Weir's Witness. He was cast because the director thought he had the right face for the part. Although he was simultaneously cast as a soldier in Shakespeare in the Park's production of Henry V, he chose to work on Witness instead, citing a desire to try something new. Mortensen credited that decision and the positive experience on the film as the start of his film career. Also in 1985, he was cast in the role of Bragg on the TV soap opera Search for Tomorrow, and played Tybalt opposite Michael Cerveris in a stage production of Romeo and Juliet at Chicago's Goodman Theatre.

Mortensen's 1987 performance in Bent at the Coast Playhouse, Los Angeles, won him a Dramalogue Critics' Award. The play, which revolves around homosexual prisoners in a concentration camp in Nazi Germany, was known for the leading performance by Ian McKellen, with whom Mortensen later costarred in the film trilogy The Lord of the Rings. The same year, Mortensen had a supporting role as Jerome Stample in the black comedy Salvation!, and played a co-lead role as a convict in the horror film Prison. He also guest starred as a police detective on the hit TV series Miami Vice. In 1988, Mortensen played a minor part as Green, the abusive husband of Jewel (Molly Ringwald), in Fresh Horses. The following year, Mortensen appeared in a minor role as Hans in Tripwire.

Mortensen made three film appearances in 1990: Edward "Tex" Sawyer, a member of a cannibalistic family in the horror film sequel Leatherface: The Texas Chainsaw Massacre III, John W. Poe in Young Guns II, and Cameron Dove, a military veteran suffering from radiation poisoning in The Reflecting Skin. The Reflecting Skin was Mortensen's first film to premiere at the Cannes Film Festival. The following year, Mortensen starred as Frank Roberts in Sean Penn's directorial debut The Indian Runner. Sandy Dennis, who played Frank Roberts's mother in the film and was a personal friend of Mortensen, was dying of ovarian cancer during filming. Mortensen described the filming experience as having an "undercurrent of loss," and wrote the poem "For Sandy Dennis" in her honor.

In 1992, Mortensen starred in Ruby Cairo alongside Liam Neeson and Andie MacDowell. Although Ruby Cairo was Mortensen's highest-budget film at this point in his career, it was a commercial failure, bringing in only 608,000 on its 24 million dollar budget. The next year, the film was recut and given the title Deception. Several scenes were reshot for Deception, including a sex scene between Mortensen and MacDowell, which was removed and replaced with a less intimate dialogue on a balcony.

By the mid-1990s, Mortensen was consistently making several film appearances a year. During this time, Mortensen was frequently cast in crime dramas such as Lalin Miasso in Carlito's Way, Carl Frazer in The Young Americans, Nick Davis in American Yakuza, and Guy Foucard in Albino Alligator.

Other films from that time include Jane Campion's The Portrait of a Lady, where he played Caspar Goodwood, a love interest of the film's protagonist, Isabel Archer (Nicole Kidman). He also acted in Crimson Tide, Daylight, A Walk on the Moon, The Passion of Darkly Noon, 28 Days, and The Prophecy, with Christopher Walken.

With a budget of $50 million, G.I Jane (1997) was Mortensen's biggest budget film appearance prior to his role in Lord of the Rings. Although the film earned his co-star, Demi Moore, a Golden Raspberry Award for her role, Mortensen's performance as Command Master Chief John James 'Jack' Urgayle was favorably received.

In 1998, Mortensen appeared in remakes of two Alfred Hitchcock movies: Psycho and A Perfect Murder (which was a remake of Dial M for Murder).

=== 2000s: The Lord of the Rings and breakthrough ===
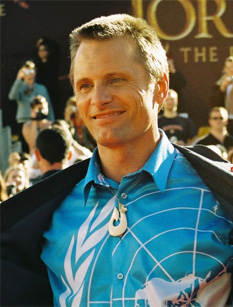
Mortensen at the premiere of The Lord of the Rings: The Return of the King, December 1, 2003

Another major mainstream breakthrough came in 1999, when Peter Jackson cast him as Aragorn in The Lord of the Rings film trilogy. According to the Special Extended Edition DVD of The Lord of the Rings: The Fellowship of the Ring, Mortensen was a last-minute replacement for Stuart Townsend, and would not have taken the part of Aragorn had it not been for his son's enthusiasm for the J. R. R. Tolkien novel. He received critical acclaim for his portrayal of Aragorn, and was ranked No. 15 on a 2015 survey of "The 100 Greatest Movie Characters" conducted by Empire.

In The Two Towers DVD extras, the film's swordmaster, Bob Anderson, described Mortensen as "the best swordsman I've ever trained." Mortensen often performed his own stunts, and even the injuries he sustained during several of them, including two broken toes, did not dampen his enthusiasm. At one point during filming of The Two Towers, Mortensen, Orlando Bloom, and Brett Beattie (stunt double for John Rhys-Davies) all had painful injuries, which led to Peter Jackson jokingly referring to the three as "the walking wounded." Also, according to the Special Extended Edition DVD of The Lord of the Rings: The Return of the King, Mortensen purchased the two horses, Uraeus and Kenny, whom he had ridden and bonded with over the duration of the films.

In 2004, Mortensen starred as Frank Hopkins in Hidalgo, the story of an ex-army courier who travels to Arabia to compete with his horse, Hidalgo, in a dangerous desert race for a contest prize.

Mortensen starred in David Cronenberg's 2005 film A History of Violence as a family man revealed to have had an unsavory previous career. He was nominated for a Satellite Award for Outstanding Actor in a Motion Picture for this role. In the DVD extras for A History of Violence, Cronenberg related that Mortensen is the only actor he had come across who would come back from weekends with his family with items he had bought to use as props on the set.

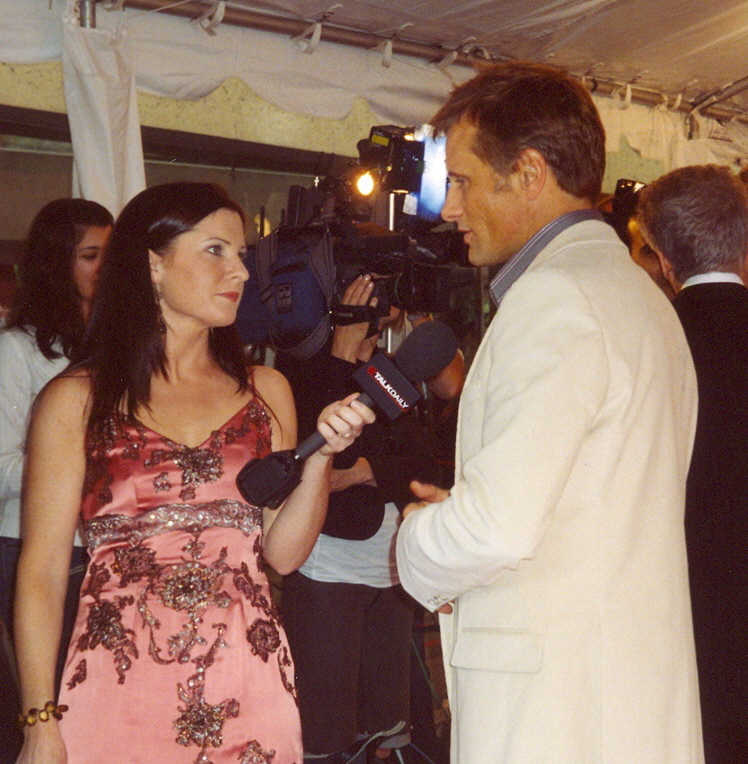
Mortensen interviewed by eTalk Daily at the 2005 Toronto International Film Festival, for A History of Violence

In 2006, he starred as Captain Diego Alatriste in the Spanish language film Alatriste, based on the series of novels The Adventures of Captain Alatriste, written by the Spanish writer Arturo Pérez-Reverte.

In September 2007, the film Eastern Promises, directed by David Cronenberg, was released to critical acclaim for the film itself and for Mortensen's performance as a Russian gangster on the rise in London. His nude fight scene in a steam room was applauded by Roger Ebert: "Years from now, it will be referred to as a benchmark." Mortensen's performance in Eastern Promises resulted in his winning the Best Performance by an Actor in a British Independent Film award from the British Independent Film Awards. He was also nominated for an Academy Award for Best Actor.

Mortensen appeared as himself in the 2009 film Reclaiming the Blade, in which he discussed his passion for the sword and his sword-work in films such as The Lord of the Rings and Alatriste. Mortensen also talked about his work with Bob Anderson, the swordmaster on The Lord of the Rings, Alatriste, Pirates of the Caribbean and many others.

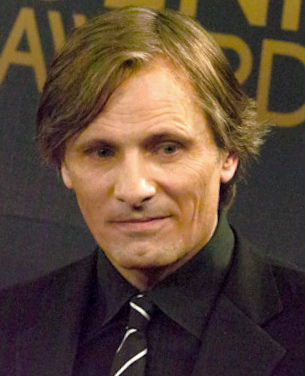
Mortensen at the 32nd Genie Awards in March 2012

In 2009, Mortensen performed in The People Speak, a documentary feature film that uses dramatic and musical performances of the letters, diaries, and speeches of everyday Americans, based on historian Howard Zinn's A People's History of the United States. Later that year, he joined the cast of The Road, a film adaptation of the Cormac McCarthy novel of the same name, and collaborated with David Cronenberg for a third time on A Dangerous Method.

=== 2010s–present: Critical acclaim ===
After two years, Mortensen returned to theater in 2011, starring in Ariel Dorfman's Purgatorio ("Purgatory") in Madrid. Purgatorio is Mortensen's first play in Spanish. The play is about a man and woman confined either in a psychiatric hospital or prison together. During production, Mortensen's mother became ill and he pulled out of the initial premiere date, the first time he had ever done so for a project. The play premiered from November 4 to December 18.

During production for the 2012 film The Hobbit: An Unexpected Journey, Mortensen was offered to reprise his role as Aragorn, but he declined because the character does not appear in the novel the film is based on.

Mortensen starred in the 2016 film Captain Fantastic, for which he received his second Academy Award nomination. Alonso Duralde of TheWrap praised Mortensen's performance, saying, "The movie really belongs to Mortensen, who allows Ben to be exasperating, arrogant, and impatient but also warm, loving, and caring. He's a tough but adoring father, a grieving widower and a passionate defender of his wife's final wishes, and Mortensen plays all these notes, and more with subtlety and grace".

In 2018, he starred in the film Green Book. Mortensen portrayed Tony Lip, an Italian-American bouncer hired to drive and protect pianist Don Shirley (Mahershala Ali) on a tour through the Jim Crow South from 1962 to 1963. Reflecting on the character, Mortensen stated, "I was attracted to playing Tony in part because it was a different kind of character, but the main thing I liked about him was his heart". Mortensen received his third Academy Award nomination for his portrayal of Lip.

In 2020, Mortensen released his directorial debut Falling, which he also wrote, produced, composed the score for and starred in alongside Lance Henriksen at the Sundance Film Festival. Mortensen had based the story on his own family's history, including his parents suffering from dementia. The film is dedicated to his brothers, Charles and Walter Mortensen.

During the COVID-19 pandemic in May 2020, Mortensen along with fellow Lord of the Rings actors Sean Astin, Sean Bean, Orlando Bloom, Billy Boyd, Ian McKellen, Dominic Monaghan, Miranda Otto, John Rhys-Davies, Andy Serkis, Liv Tyler, Karl Urban, Elijah Wood, writer Philippa Boyens, and director Peter Jackson joined actor Josh Gad's YouTube series Reunited Apart, which reunites the cast of popular movies through video-conferencing, and promotes donations to non-profit charities.

Mortensen was cast as British cave diver Rick Stanton in the biographical film Thirteen Lives directed by Ron Howard which was released in July 2022. Mortensen was taught cave diving by Stanton personally to prepare for the role.

Mortensen reunited with David Cronenberg in the horror sci-fi film Crimes of the Future in 2022. Mortensen reunited with Lisandro Alonso on the film Eureka. Mortensen and Caleb Landry Jones will star together in the Vietnam War thriller Two Wolves which will be directed by documentary filmmaker Alex Gibney.

He wrote, directed, and stars in a Western film titled The Dead Don't Hurt. It also stars Vicky Krieps and it was shot in Mexico.

== Literary and arts career ==
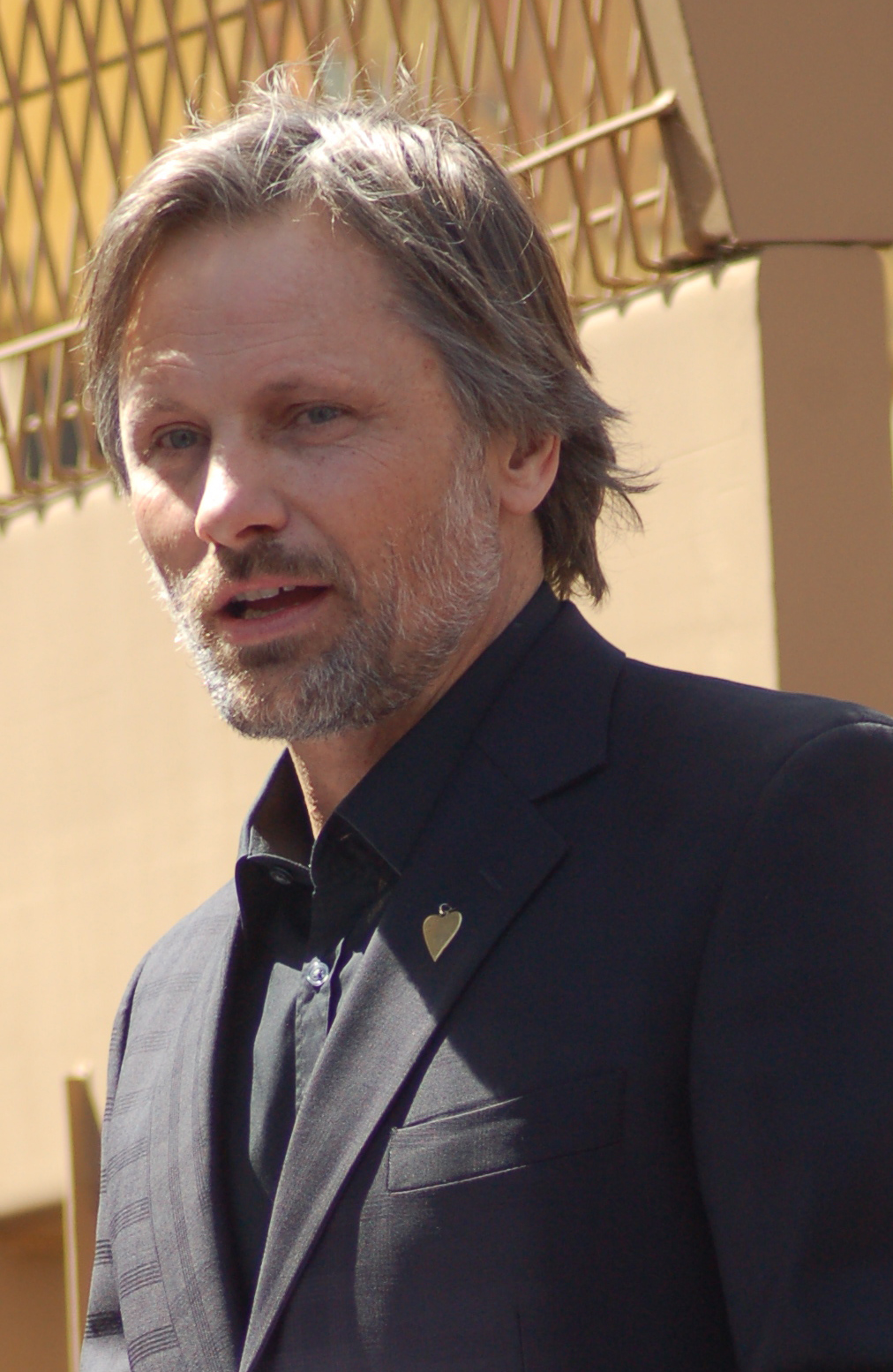
Mortensen in 2010

=== Perceval Press ===
With part of his earnings from The Lord of the Rings, Mortensen founded the Perceval Press publishing house—named after the knight from the legend of King Arthur—to help other artists by publishing works that might not find a home in more traditional publishing venues. Perceval Press is also the home of Mortensen's many personal artistic projects in the area of fine arts, photography, poetry, song, and literature.

=== Bibliography ===
Mortensen is also an author, with various books of poetry, photography, and painting published. His poems are written in English, Danish, and Spanish. With anthropologists Federico Bossert and Diego Villar, he has written several works related to ethnography of Indigenous peoples in South America, specifically in Argentina, Brazil, Paraguay, and Uruguay. Some of the published books co-authored by Mortensen are Sons of the Forest and Skovbo. Mortensen's bibliography includes:

Title	Year	Type	Note
Ten Last Night	1993	Poetry	
Recent Forgeries	1998	Poetry, Art, Photos	Documents Mortensen's first solo exhibition and includes a CD with music and spoken-word poetry. Introduction by Dennis Hopper.
Errant Vine	2000	Poetry, Photos	Limited edition booklet of an exhibit at the Robert Mann Gallery.
Hole in the Sun	2002	Photos	Color and black & white photographs of a back yard swimming pool.
Sign Language	2002	Art, Photos	A catalog from an exhibition of his works, combining photographs, paintings, and poetry into a multimedia diary of his time in New Zealand while filming The Lord of the Rings: The Fellowship of the Ring. Introduction by Kevin Power.
Coincidence of Memory	2002	Poetry, Art, Photos	
Mo Te Upoko-o-te-ika/For Wellington	2003	-	A book to accompany the joint exhibitions at Massey University and the Wellington City Gallery during the premiere of The Lord of the Rings: The Return of the King.
45301	2003	Photos	Photographs shot during travels to Morocco, Cuba, and the northern plains of the United States.
Un hueco en el sol	2003	Booklet	Published to accompany the exhibition "Un hueco en el sol" at the Fototeca de Cuba in Havana.
Miyelo	2003	Ethnography, Photos	A series of panoramic photographs of a Lakota Ghost Dance. It also tells about the events leading up to the massacre at Wounded Knee.
Nye Falsknerier	2003	Poetry, Art, Photos	Paintings and poems translated into Danish from Ten Last Night, Recent Forgeries, Coincidence of Memory.
The Horse is Good	2004	Photos	Photos shot in Morocco, South Dakota, Montana, California, Iceland, New Zealand, Denmark, Brazil, and Argentina.
Linger	2005	Poetry, Photos	Images from Spain (partly shot during his work on the film Alatriste), Morocco, Iceland, United States, and Denmark
I Forget You For Ever	2006	Photos	
Skovbo	2008	Poetry, Photos	Poetry in English and Danish.
Sådanset	2008	Booklet	Published to accompany the exhibition Sådanset (October 18 – November 16, 2008) at the Palæfløjen in Roskilde, Denmark.
Canciones de Invierno – Winter Songs	2010	Poetry, Photos	Poetry in Spanish and English accompanied by landscape photos from the previous two winters.
That Turned Ugly Fast	2015	Foreword/Introduction	Poems by Mark Berriman with a foreword by Viggo Mortensen.
Ramas Para Un Nido	2017	Photos	
Look	2024	Poetry, Art, Photos	

=== Visual arts and discography ===
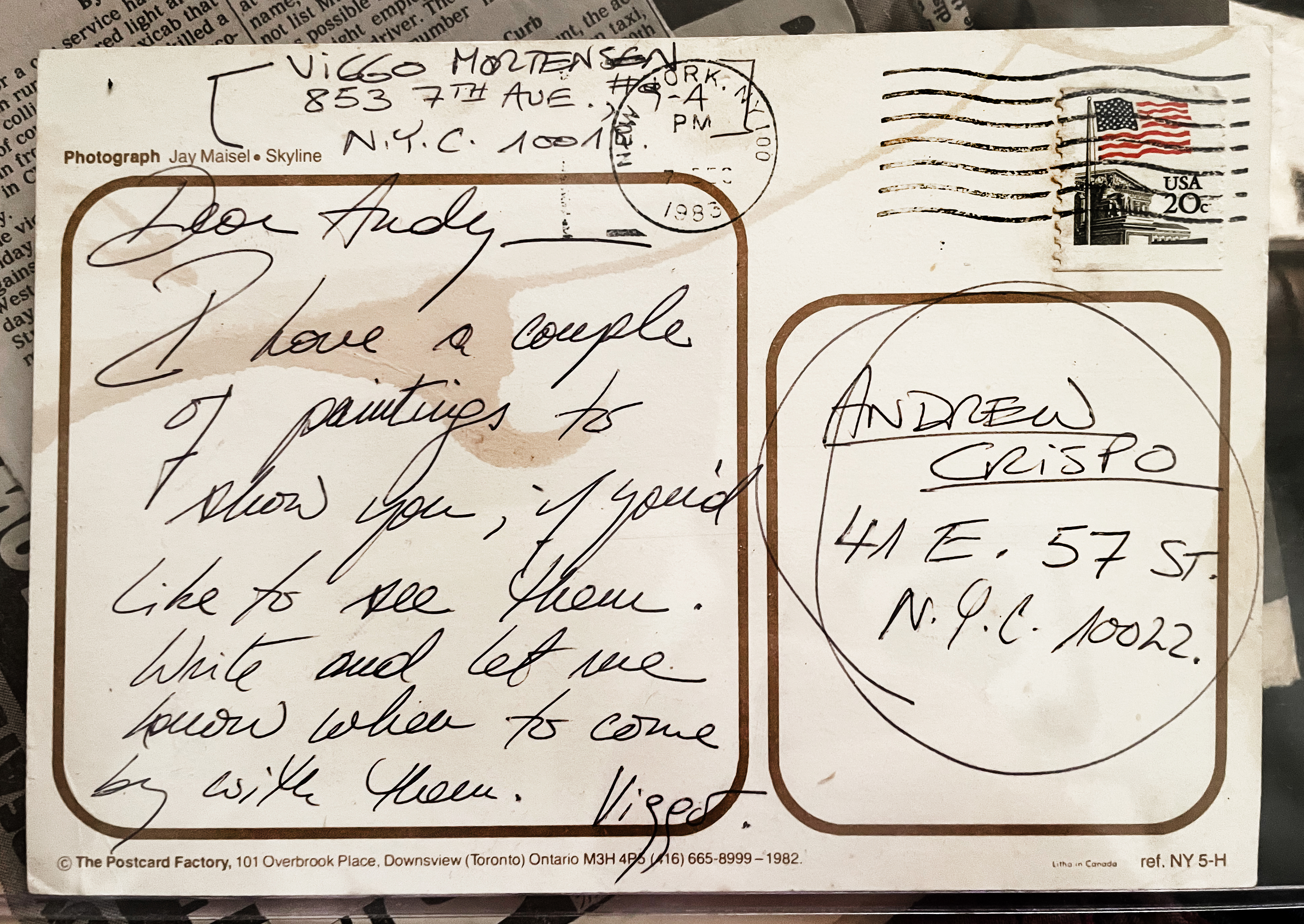
Mortensen's 1983 Paintings Submission Inquiry

Mortensen is a painter and photographer. His paintings are frequently abstract and often contain fragments of his poetry therein. His paintings have been featured in galleries worldwide, and many of the paintings of the artist he portrayed in A Perfect Murder are his own.

Mortensen experiments with his poetry and music by mixing the two art forms. He has collaborated with guitarist Buckethead on several albums, mostly released on his own label (Perceval Press) or TDRS Music. Viggo was first introduced to Buckethead's work while working on sounds for an educational CD on Greek mythology. The finished product included a guitar part by Buckethead, which caught Viggo's ear and led him to initiate contact with the guitarist. The collaboration grew from there.

Mortensen's discography includes:

- 1994: Don't Tell Me What to Do
- 1997: One Less Thing to Worry About
- 1998: Recent Forgeries
- 1999: The Other Parade
- 1999: One Man's Meat
- 1999: Live at Beyond Baroque
- 2003: Pandemoniumfromamerica
- 2004: Live at Beyond Baroque II
- 2004: Please Tomorrow
- 2004: This, That, and the Other
- 2005: Intelligence Failure
- 2006: 3 Fools 4 April
- 2007: Time Waits for Everyone
- 2008: At All
- 2010: Canciones de Invierno
- 2011: Reunion
- 2013: Acá
- 2015: Under the Weather
- 2016: Seventeen Odd Songs
- 2017: Preguntas Desde la Orilla
- 2018: Godzilla Sleeps Alone

Mortensen is featured on The Lord of the Rings: The Return of the King soundtrack, singing "Aragorn's Coronation" (the name of the extended version of this song in the 3rd original sound track is "The Return of the King"), the words by Tolkien and the music composed by Mortensen. In the extended DVD edition of the first Lord of the Rings movie, The Fellowship of the Ring, he sings the song "The Lay of Beren and Lúthien".

== Personal life ==
=== Family and relationships ===
Mortensen holds American, Canadian and Danish citizenships. He speaks English, Spanish and Danish fluently, he stated that he was raised speaking English and Spanish, and sometimes feels that, when speaking Spanish, he "can get to the heart of the matter better".

Mortensen met singer Exene Cervenka in 1986 on the set of the comedy Salvation! The couple married on July 8, 1987. On January 28, 1988, Cervenka gave birth to their son, who later played his on-screen son in the film Crimson Tide. Mortensen and Cervenka lived in Idaho for three years. They separated in 1992 and divorced in 1997. Since 2009, he has been in a relationship with Spanish actress Ariadna Gil. Though the couple reside in Madrid, Mortensen spends much of his time in the United States, and has stated, "I am a citizen and longtime resident of the United States and am attached to its landscapes, history, and people." He has owned property in Sandpoint, Idaho, and spends time there when not filming movies.

Mortensen founded Perceval Press, a publishing company, in 1995.

Mortensen has talked about his family's struggles with dementia, seeing both of his parents, three of his four grandparents, aunts, uncles, and his stepfather battle the condition. In 2016, Mortensen traveled to New York to take care of his father, who died a year later. Two years earlier, Mortensen's mother had also died from complications of the condition.

Mortensen was a close friend of Icelandic painter Georg Guðni Hauksson until the latter's death in 2011. He had long been an admirer of Georg Guðni's work as a landscape artist, and the two published books together.

=== Sports ===
Mortensen has expressed a liking for association football, ice hockey and baseball. His favorite teams include Argentine club San Lorenzo de Almagro, English team Fulham, Spanish team Real Madrid, Turkish team Beşiktaş, and both the Argentine and Danish national teams. His favorite football players are Diego Maradona and Héctor "Bambino" Veira. He is a fan of the Montreal Canadiens and wore a Canadiens shirt underneath his costume throughout the filming of the Lord of the Rings trilogy. During the 100th anniversary celebrations of the Montreal Canadiens, Mortensen introduced one of his idols, Guy Lafleur, to the crowd at the Bell Centre in Montreal. He is also a fan of the New York Mets and, in an interview promoting 2009 film The Road, was seen wearing apparel indicating his support for the Australian Football League's Collingwood Magpies. While appearing on the Late Show with David Letterman, he held a sign supporting the New York Giants of the NFL.

=== Political activities ===
Mortensen volunteered for the Jesse Jackson 1988 presidential campaign.

During the press tour for Lord of the Rings: Fellowship of the Ring, which occurred between the September 11 attacks and the Second Gulf War, Mortensen appeared in an interview wearing a t-shirt on which he had written, "No More Blood for Oil."

In 2009, Mortensen signed a protest stating that the Toronto International Film Festival's "Spotlight on Tel Aviv" program implicitly condoned the Israeli occupation and marginalization of Palestinians. In 2015 he donated $1,000 to Irish political party Sinn Féin.

Mortensen endorsed Senator Bernie Sanders for U.S. president during the primaries for the 2016 election. After Sanders failed to win the Democratic Party nomination, Mortensen endorsed Green Party candidate Jill Stein. He wrote an open letter just before Election Day 2016 in which he listed the reasons he disagreed with Hillary Clinton's policies and could not support her in the race against Donald Trump, though he thought that Clinton would be elected president. He went on to narrate a documentary, The Revolution Televised, about the 2016 presidential election and the protests in the aftermath of the Democratic National Convention.

Since 2018, Mortensen has been a member of the Catalan NGO Òmnium Cultural, a pro-independence organization dedicated to promoting Catalan culture and language in the arts and the public sphere. After Vox, a far-right Spanish party, published a tweet depicting Mortensen as Aragorn fighting various social movements, including pro-Catalan separatists, during the campaign for the 2019 Spanish general election, Mortensen wrote a letter to the editor criticizing the depiction saying, "Not only is it absurd that I, the actor who embodied this character... and a person interested in the rich variety of cultures and languages that exist in Spain and the world, is linked to an ultra-nationalist and neo-fascist political party, it is even more ridiculous to use the character of Aragorn, a polyglot statesman who advocates knowledge and inclusion of the diverse races, customs and languages of Middle Earth, to legitimize an anti-immigrant, anti-feminist and Islamophobic political group."

In May 2020, Mortensen signed an open letter urging Israel to end its blockade of the Gaza Strip. In October 2023, Mortensen signed the Artists4Ceasefire open letter to President Joe Biden, calling for a ceasefire in the Gaza war.

Mortensen condemned the 2022 Russian invasion of Ukraine, calling the latter a "proud and proudly independent nation, and you should stay that way". In 2024, he and 34 activists and celebrities signed a petition urging Congress to continue sending aid to Ukraine. He also showed The Dead Don't Hurt at the Mykolaichuk Open in Chernivtsi and gave his opening speech in Ukrainian.

In May 2024, Mortensen criticized Javier Milei's Argentine government, calling him a "clown" and "a puppet of the political right".

== Filmography ==
=== Film ===
Key
†	Denotes films that have not yet been released

Year	Title	Role	Notes
1985	Witness	Moses Hochleitner	
1987	Salvation!	Jerome Stample	
1987	Prison	Burke	
1988	Fresh Horses	Green	
1989	Tripwire	Hans	
1990	Leatherface: The Texas Chainsaw Massacre III	Edward "Tex" Sawyer	
1990	Young Guns II	John W. Poe	
1990	The Reflecting Skin	Cameron Dove	
1991	The Indian Runner	Frank Roberts	
1992	Ruby Cairo	John E. "Johnny" Faro	
1993	Boiling Point	Ronnie	
1993	Carlito's Way	Lalin Miasso	
1993	The Young Americans	Carl Frazer	
1994	The Crew	Phillip	
1994	Floundering	Homeless Man	
1994	Gospel According to Harry	Wes	
1994	American Yakuza	Nick Davis / David Brandt	
1995	Gimlet	Hombre	
1995	Crimson Tide	LT. Peter Ince, WEPS	
1995	The Passion of Darkly Noon	Clay	
1995	Black Velvet Pantsuit	Junkie	
1995	The Prophecy	Lucifer	
1996	Albino Alligator	Guy Foucard	
1996	Daylight	Roy Nord	
1996	The Portrait of a Lady	Caspar Goodwood	
1997	Vanishing Point	Jimmy Kowalski	
1997	G.I. Jane	CMC Jack Urgayle	
1997	My Brother's Gun	Juanito	
1998	A Perfect Murder	David Shaw	
1998	Psycho	Samuel "Sam" Loomis	
1999	A Walk on the Moon	Walker Jerome	
2000	28 Days	Eddie Boone	
2001	The Lord of the Rings: The Fellowship of the Ring	Aragorn	
2002	The Lord of the Rings: The Two Towers	Aragorn	
2003	The Lord of the Rings: The Return of the King	Aragorn	
2004	Hidalgo	Frank Hopkins	
2005	A History of Violence	Tom Stall / Joey Cusack	
2006	Alatriste	Diego Alatriste y Tenorio	
2007	Eastern Promises	Nikolai Luzhin	
2008	Appaloosa	Everett Hitch	
2008	Good	John Halder	
2009	The Road	The Man	
2011	A Dangerous Method	Sigmund Freud	
2012	On the Road	Old Bull Lee	
2012	Everybody Has a Plan	Agustín / Pedro	Also producer
2014	The Two Faces of January	Chester MacFarland	
2014	Jauja	Gunnar Dinesen	Also producer and composer
2014	Far from Men	Daru	Also co-producer
2016	Captain Fantastic	Ben Cash	
2018	Green Book	Tony Lip	
2020	Falling	John Petersen	Also director, producer, writer and music composer
2022	Crimes of the Future	Saul Tenser	
2022	Thirteen Lives	Richard Stanton	
2023	Eureka	Murphy	
2023	The Dead Don't Hurt	Holger Olsen	Also director, producer, writer and music composer
2026	I Love Boosters	Heine Schlumpf	Voice cameo
TBA	Embers	Konrad	Post-production
TBA	Porto Rico		Filming

=== Television ===
Year	Title	Role	Notes
1984	George Washington	Fort Le Boeuf Lieutenant	Miniseries, 1 episode
1985	Search for Tomorrow	Bragg	Episode #1.8837
1985	ABC Afterschool Special	Tim	Episode: "High School Narc"
1987	Miami Vice	Eddie Trumbull	Episode: "Red Tape"
1991	Once in a Blue Moon		Failed pilot
2020	Cosmos: Possible Worlds	Nikolai Vavilov	Episode: "Vavilov"

=== Video games ===
Year	Title	Voice role	Notes
2002	The Lord of the Rings: The Two Towers	Aragorn	
2012	Lego The Lord of the Rings	Aragorn	Archive audio

== Awards and nominations ==
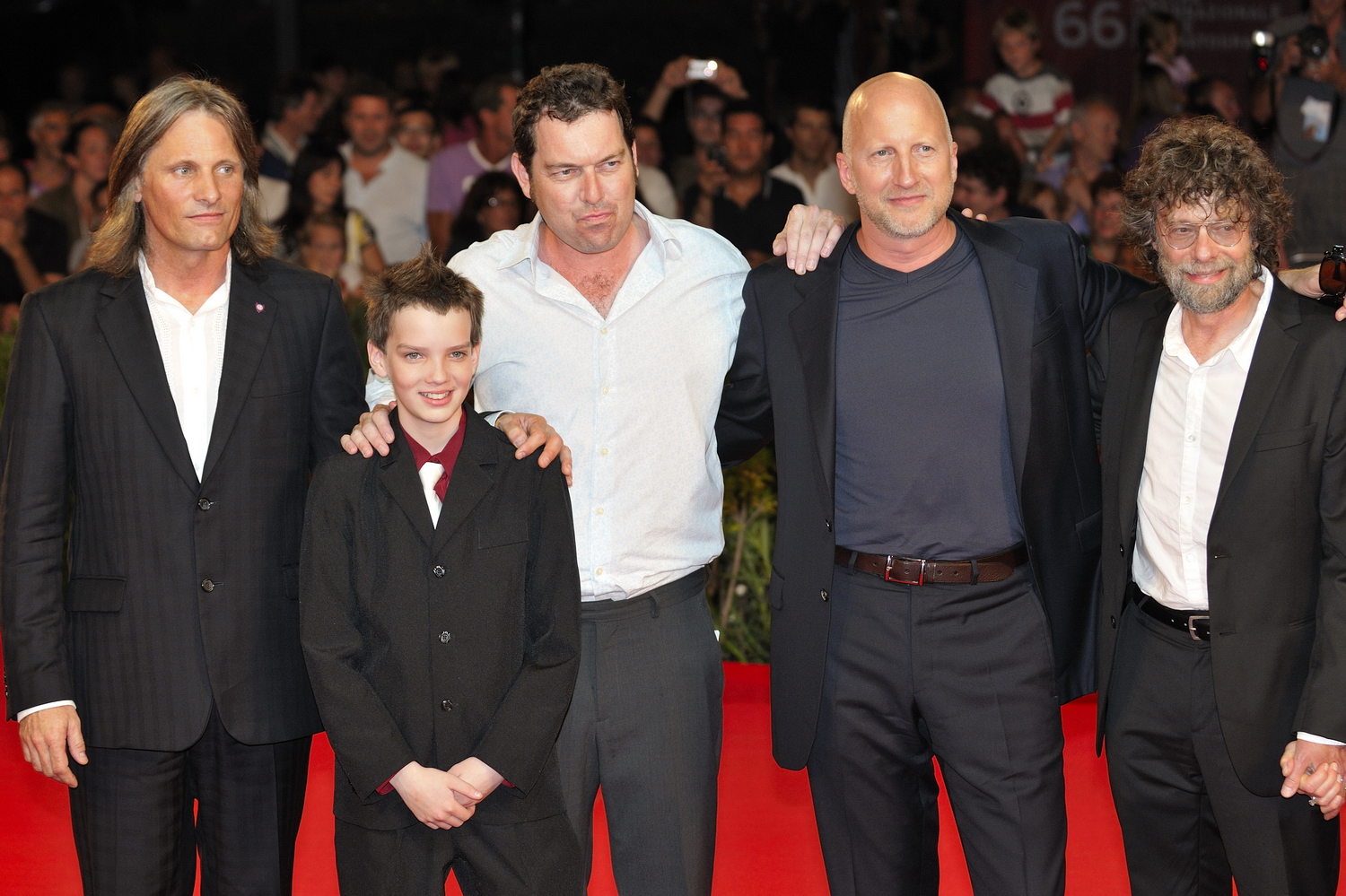
Mortensen and Kodi Smit-McPhee, screenwriter Joe Penhall, director John Hillcoat and producer Steve Schwartz at the 2009 Venice Film Festival for The Road

Mortensen has received numerous accolades throughout his career. His portrayal of Aragorn in The Lord of the Rings trilogy earned him nominations for the SAG Award for Outstanding Cast, winning for the final installment The Return of the King (2003).

His performances in Eastern Promises (2007), Captain Fantastic (2016) and Green Book (2018) earned him nominations for the Academy Award, BAFTA Award, Golden Globe (Note: The first two were nominated in the drama category and the last was nominated in the musical or comedy category.) and SAG Award for Best Actor. The first (Note: which also won him the British Independent Film Award for Best Actor.) and last (Note: which also won him the National Board of Review Award for Best Actor.) of these, as well as The Road (2009), also earned him nominations for the Critics' Choice Movie Award for Best Actor. He also received a nomination for the Golden Globe Award for Best Supporting Actor for his role in A Dangerous Method (2011), which won him the Canadian Screen Award.

Following his appearance in the Lord of the Rings, in 2006 he was granted an honorary doctorate by his alma mater, St. Lawrence University.

On October 13, 2006, he was awarded the Gold Medal of the Province and the City of León, Spain.

On April 16, 2010, he was awarded the Knight's Cross of the Order of the Dannebrog.

== See also ==
- List of actors with Academy Award nominations
- List of actors with three or more Academy Award nominations in acting categories
