= Perceval Press =

US publisher founded by Viggo Mortensen and Pilar Perez

- Status: Active
- Founded: 2002
- Founder: Viggo Mortensen; Pilar Perez
- Country of origin: United States
- Headquarters location: Santa Monica, California
- Distribution: International
- Owner: Viggo Mortensen
- Official website: Perceval Press

Perceval Press is actor/artist Viggo Mortensen's publishing company, established in 2002 with partner Pilar Perez. Based in Santa Monica, California, the press specializes in books of art, critical writing, and poetry.

== History ==
Mortensen started Perceval Press to publish individuals who may otherwise have gone unnoticed and to do so without compromise, while keeping prices as low as possible.

Perceval Press is known for its use of high-quality printing materials and press procedures, all of which are personally supervised by Mortensen, who has been called an "Indie Publishing Mogul" by The New York Times.

I go over all the books with a fine-tooth comb before they go out. – Viggo Mortensen

Perceval Press's slate is diverse, exploring poetry, song, graphic and fine arts, photography, fiction and non-fiction, scholarly essays and literature. Some of the books and CDs are by Mortensen himself, or in direct collaboration with other artists.

Mortensen once publicly noted that his work on the film Appaloosa caused him to fall behind in his 2007 obligations to Perceval Press and its slate of artists.
