= G.I. Joe: Cobra Strike =

1983 video game

- Developer: Parker Brothers
- Publisher: Parker Brothers
- Designer: John Emerson
- Platform: Atari 2600
- Release: NA: 1983
- Genre: Action
- Modes: Single-player, multiplayer

G.I. Joe: Cobra Strike is an action video game written by John Emerson for the Atari 2600 and published in 1983 by Parker Brothers. The game is loosely based on the G.I. Joe franchise and is the first licensed G.I. Joe video game. There are three game modes: single-player, two player cooperative, and two player competitive. The UK version was renamed Action Man: Action Force, based on the Action Man franchise.

Parker Brothers held a contest in which a player could win a Black Cobra Cap by reaching the 16th level of the game.

== Gameplay ==
Gameplay screenshot

In the single-player mode, the player controls a G.I. Joe training camp on the bottom of the screen protected by a barrier and armed with two laser cannons. In this mode the goal is to keep the giant Cobra-operated robot snake from destroying the shield and thus the training camp by hitting it eight times. The Cobra robot shoots venom and laser beams.

In two-player cooperative mode control of the G.I. Joe training game is split between two players as they work to destroy the Cobra robot. In the two-player competition mode one player controls the Cobra robot and another player controls the training camp.

== Action Force ==
Based on the European version of G.I. Joe known as Action Force, the game was published by Parker Brothers as Action Man: Action Force in PAL format for European markets. In the game, the Action Force training camp is under siege from a giant Cobra Combat Machine built by the evil Baron Ironblood. Baron Ironblood was the leader of the Red Shadows in the Action Force comic book universe, before changing his name to Cobra Commander and creating the Cobra Organization later in the series.

== Reception ==
In a 1983 review, Video Games magazine wrote that G.I. Joe: Cobra Strike, "looks far better than it plays". The reviewer concluded, "As a one-player game, I found that this cart doesn't sustain much interest....It may work as a two player game".

In 2009, Jeremy Parish of Retronauts blog wrote that this game "had about as much to do with G.I. Joe as any other licensed game from that era, which is to say not a whole hell of a lot", comparing it to E.T. for the Atari 2600.
